= Washington v. Washington State Commercial Passenger Fishing Vessel Association =

1979 U.S. Supreme Court case on indigenous fishing rights in Washington State

Washington v. Washington State Commercial Passenger Fishing Vessel Ass'n
- Supreme Court of the United States

Argued February 28, 1979 Decided July 2, 1979
- Full case name: Washington v. Washington State Commercial Passenger Fishing Vessel Ass'n
- Citations: 443 U.S. 658 (more)
- Argument: Oral argument

Holding
- The usual and accustomed grounds clause provides Indian fishers with a certain share of the anadromous fish in a run. The Fish and Game Departments could also be required to make rules protecting this right due to the Supremacy Clause.

Court membership
- Chief Justice Warren E. Burger Associate Justices William J. Brennan Jr. · Potter Stewart; Byron White · Thurgood Marshall; Harry Blackmun · Lewis F. Powell Jr. William Rehnquist · John P. Stevens

Case opinions
- Majority: Stevens, joined by Blackmun, Brennan, Burger, Marshall, White
- Dissent: Powell, joined by Stewart, Rehnquist

Washington v. Washington State Commercial Passenger Fishing Vessel Association, 443 U.S. 658 (1979), was a United States Supreme Court case related to Indian fishing rights in Washington State. It held that the usual and accustomed clause of the Stevens Treaties protected Indians' share of anadromous fish in addition to protecting fishing grounds. To do this, runs of anadromous fish that travel through tribal fishing areas should be divided equally between treaty-protected and non-treaty parties. After that, the treaty-protected parties cut should be lowered if they can be satisfied with a smaller amount. The court also held that its decision superseded state law, and that Washington's Game and Fisheries Department may be required to make laws upholding the ruling.

The decision was 6–3 in favor of Washington. John Paul Stevens wrote the majority opinion.

Philip Lacovara defended the Non-Indian Fishermen Association in the case.

== History ==
=== Treaties ===
In 1853, General Isaac Stevens was appointed governor of Washington Territory. In his first few years, he negotiated multiple treaties with Washington's Indians tribes. Much of the language in the treaties was not fully understood by the tribes and resulted in tribes losing a lot of their land.

=== United States v. Winans ===
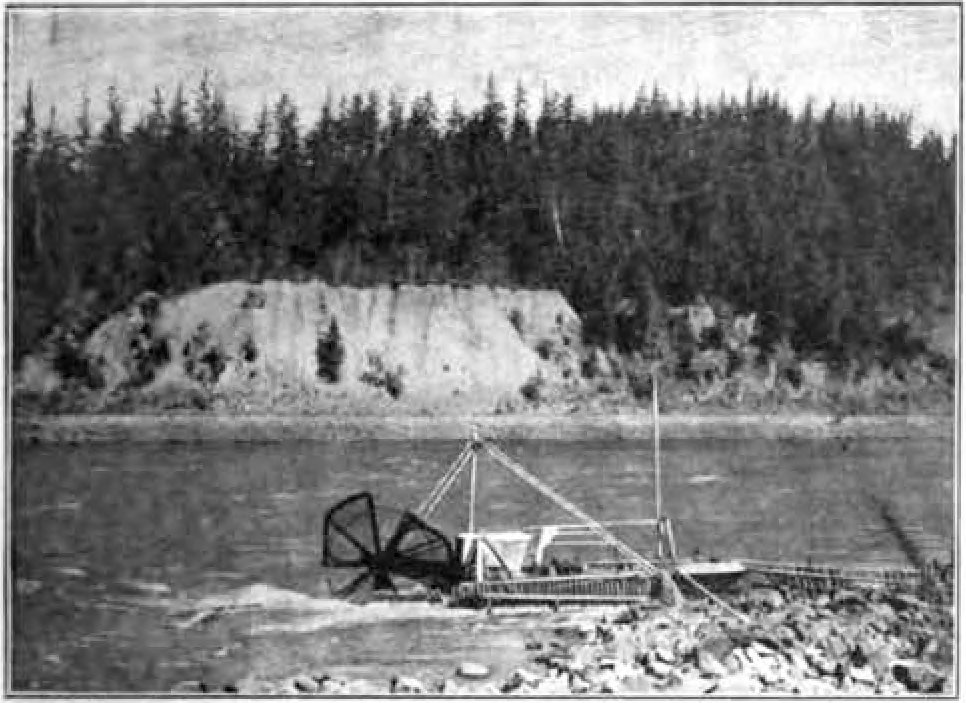
Image of a fishwheel

Importantly the treaties allowed Indians to continue fishing at "all usual and accustomed grounds ... in common with all citizens of the Territory." At the time it was expected that fish would be a limitless resource. This clause was used to support Indians fish rights in 1905. In United States v. Winans, a fish wheel was built to collect fish located in Yakima Territory. It collected all fish in the run, preventing the Yakima from collecting any. The court decided that the usual and accustomed places clause protected both fishing grounds and fish supply.

=== Fish Wars and Boldt Decision ===
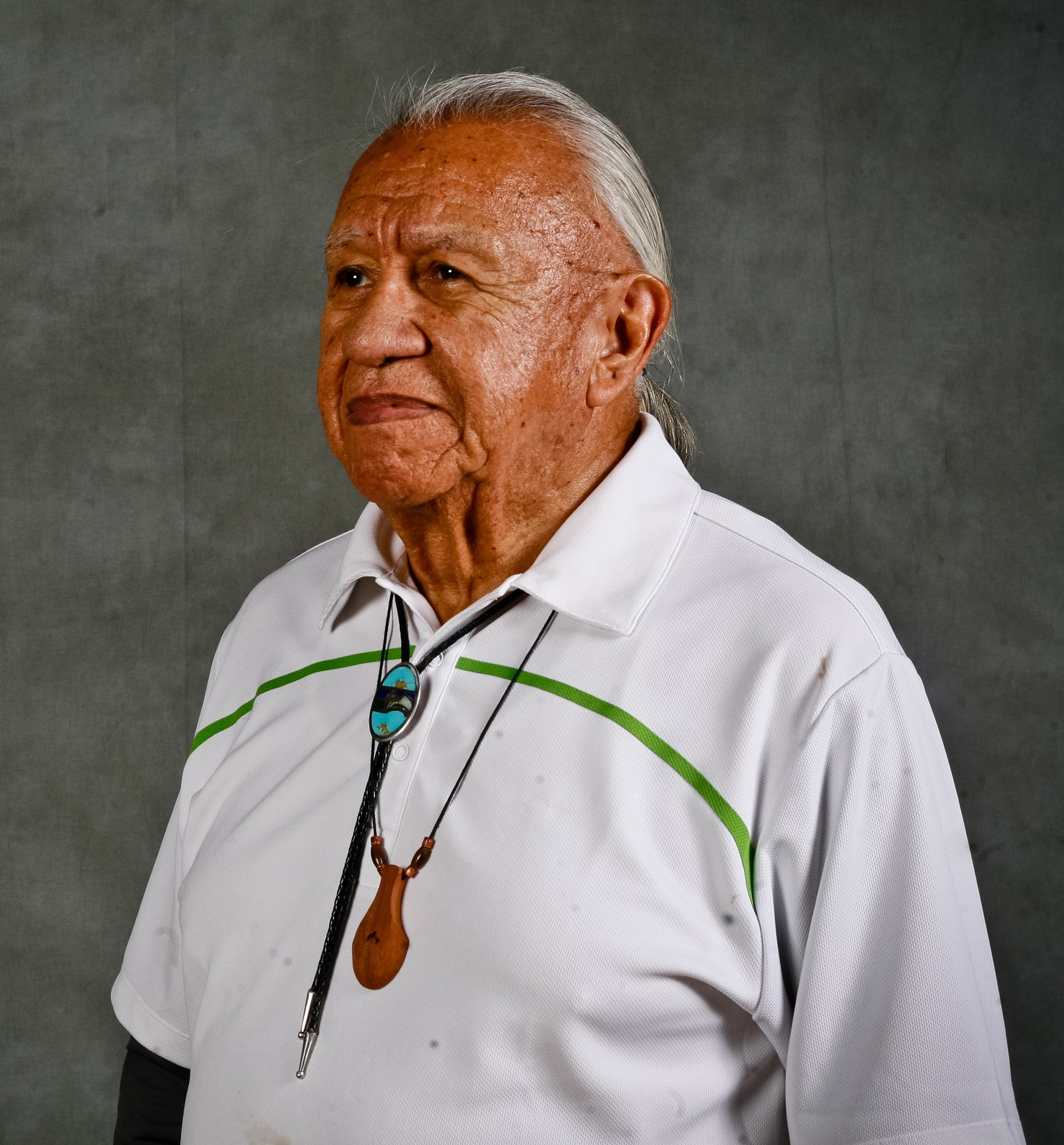
Billy Frank Jr., an important activist in the Fish Wars

Over the next 50 years the salmon populations were depleted. In the 1960s and 70s, Indians were targeted and arrested for fishing. In response, many Indians started protesting by fishing on rivers. Tensions flared until it was brought before the district court.

As a result of this, the US brought suit against Washington in support of the Indian's right to fish. The usual and accustomed grounds clause was used to support the right. Four interpretations arose from the following legal battles. The Game Department argued this only allowed access to fishing grounds and exemptions from license fees. The Fisheries Department argued this allowed a "fair and equitable share", which they decided to be one-third of the salmon in a run. The United States argued that it gave them 50% of the salmon in a run or to their needs, whichever was lower. The Indian tribes argued that they were entitled to an unlimited share of fish.

In the district court, Judge Boldt decided in favor of the Indians. He interpreted the usual and accustomed grounds clause as meaning that the state needed provide Indians with both grounds to fish and a supply of fish to harvest. Washington was required to provide a "moderate living" to the tribes, which Boldt decided to be 50% of the fish (taking the United States treaty interpretation).

=== Challenge in State Courts ===
In the following years, the Boldt decision was challenged twice in the State Supreme Court. In Puget Sound Gillnetters Assn. v. Moos and Fishing Vessel Assn. v. Tollefson it was decided the federal injunction could not be followed. This made the state switch to the Game Department's interpretation.

Due to conflict between state and federal treaty interpretations, the Supreme Court granted certiorari to review the decisions.
