= Ramona Bennett =

Puyallup leader and activist

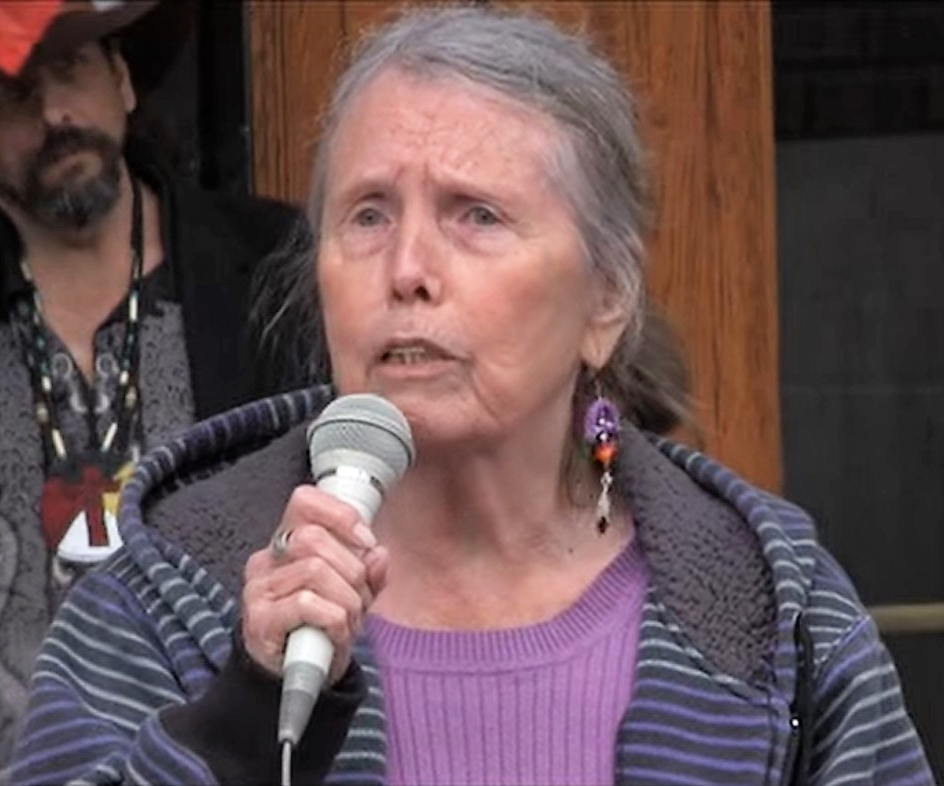
- Bennett speaks at a Rally for Leonard Peltier & Mother Earth in 2013
- Born: August 28, 1938 (age 88); Seattle, Washington, US
- Citizenship: Puyallup Tribe of the Puyallup Reservation and American
- Education: Evergreen State College; University of Puget Sound
- Known for: Native American activism

Ramona Bennett (born August 23, 1938) is an American Puyallup leader and activist who was involved in the 1960s and 1970s Fish Wars of the US Pacific Northwest and in tribal sovereignty.

== Early life and education ==
Bennett was born in Seattle, Washington. She is also descended maternally from the Swinomish and Yakama. She was born to Archie and Gertrude (née McKinney) Church in Seattle but shortly after her birth her family moved to Bremerton, Washington, where her father worked in naval shipyards and was a labor activist. Bennett indicated her White father was racist, despite his marriage to her mother; her mother fiercely instilled knowledge of and pride in her Indigenous heritage.

Bennett earned a bachelor's degree in liberal arts from Evergreen State College and a master's degree in education from the University of Puget Sound in Tacoma.

== Political involvement and activism ==
Bennett worked at the Seattle Indian Center in the early 1960s, and she became involved with several community programs, including the American Indian Women's Service League.

She increased her level of activism while engaging with colleagues including Bernie Whitebear (Confederated Tribes of the Colville), who led the claim over the Fort Lawton site that became home to the Daybreak Star Cultural Center. The fort takeover included involvement by figures like Leonard Peltier.

Seeking to address the issues of poor housing, education, and health care on the Puyallup Reservation, she was elected to the tribal council in 1968.

When the Puyallup people decided to fish from the Puyallup River, they faced intense resistance from both commercial fishers, environmentalists, and local authorities. The banning of fish traps, in particular, violated the Treaty of Point Elliott (1855) that have secured Native people continued access to the "natural resources" and in the "usual and accustomed places" which they had utilized for generations, including fish.

In 1964, Bennett co-founded the Survival of American Indians Association with Janet McCloud (Tulalip). She often worked closely with Hank Adams and other activists on fishing rights to generate political strategies and to push forward a variety of Native American sovereignty and treaty rights issues. Along with Adams, she secured sanctuary for fisherman within the local Puyallup Episcopal church. Her work paralleled that of fellow Indigenous fishing rights activists in the Pacific Northwest, such as Billy Frank Jr. (Nisqually). Bennett had also gained direct insights from other Civil Rights and Red Power Movement actions. She traveled to see the Alcatraz occupation, along with Whitebear, Adams, and Al Bridges (Puyallup/Nisqually/Duwamish), respectively, to see activist efforts at land reclamation and proclaiming recognition of Indigenous sovereignty rights. She was often a guest of Richard and Annie Oakes when traveling to the San Francisco Bay Area. She sold tribally fished salmon at Black Panther Party actions to support the Survival of American Indians Association. This model of coalitional work would be famously repeated during the fish-ins, when celebrities including Marlon Brando, Dick Gregory, Buffy Sainte-Marie, and Jane Fonda (who was arrested at Fort Lawton) lent their voice to Indigenous causes in the Pacific Northwest.

In 1970, Bennett and other Puyallup set up a camp (now called "the ceremonial place") and protected it, including through the possession of firearms. The camp was attacked by state and federal law enforcement with nearly 60 campers, fishers, and protectors being roughed up and arrested. Bennett was hit with a gas canister.

She was elected tribal chairwoman in 1976. In an interview, Bennett noted that when she traveled to a meeting of the National Tribal Chairman's Association, she was initially refused entry because she was a woman. She had to insist on her right to be present and not be relegated to sitting with "the chairman's wives". She immediately began arguing for the protection of Native American children, especially those adopted out of the community, who she saw as an endangered resource." Her testimony was included in legislative hearings, and this perspective was eventually reflected in the passage of the 1978 Indian Child Welfare Act.

Bennett helped organize a week-long occupation of the Cushman Hospital in 1976; the hospital sat on lands stolen from the Puyallup and given to the state of Washington.

In 1974, the so-called Boldt decision (United States v. State of Washington) ruled that Native Americans of Washington have secured treaty assurances to half of the fish hauls.

After her time as Tribal Chairperson, Bennett worked at the Wa-He-Lut Indian School in Olympia and with the Rainbow Youth and Family Services in 1989. As reflected by her work for youth, she herself has stated that "virtually everything constructive I've done has been because children might need it."

In 2003, she was recognized with an award by the Native Action Network. That same year she was also awarded the Enduring Spirit recognition by the American Native Women's Leadership Development Forum.
