= Ella Aquino =

Native American civil rights activist (1902–1988

Ella Pierre Aquino (September 20, 1902 – 1988) was a Lummi-Yakama-Puyallup civil rights activist and community organizer who was a matriarch of the Native American community in Seattle. She advocated on behalf of foster children and co-founded the American Indian Women's Service League in 1958. She published the Indian Center News and served as editor and columnist for the Northwest Indian News. Aquino was one of the key organizers of the occupation of Fort Lawton in 1970, which led to the establishment of the Daybreak Star Cultural Center in Discovery Park. She was the subject of the 1987 documentary Princess of the Pow Wow.

== Early life and education ==
Ella Claudia Pierre was born in Puyallup, Washington, on September 20, 1902, one of 12 children. Her father August Pierre was Lummi and her mother Annie was Yakama and Puyallup. Her grandfather had signed the 1855 Treaty of Point Elliott, when he was given the name Jack Pierre. Ella was sent to Indian boarding schools, first attending Tulalip Indian School in 1908. The Native American students were forbidden from speaking in their languages. She then attended the St. George Catholic Boarding School in Federal Way and left school after the eighth grade.

== Community activism ==
=== Indian foster children ===
Aquino moved to Seattle in 1944. Early in her career as a community activist, Aquino advocated on behalf of Native American foster children. She pressured the state of Washington to stop placing Indian children in non-Indian foster homes. (Note: Prior to the Indian Child Welfare Act of 1978, Native American children were often forcibly removed from their families.) She recruited Native American families to act as foster parents and raised political action funds.

=== American Indian Women's Service League ===
Aquino joined with several other Native American women who sought to address the growing urban population of Native Americans in Seattle caused by economic insecurity and the passage of the 1956 Indian Relocation Act. On September 10, 1958, she co-founded the American Indian Women's Service League (AIWSL) with Pearl Warren and five other Native American women. (Note: Among the founding members of the American Indian Women's Service League were Ella Aquino, Pearl Warren, Adeline Garcia, and Mary Jo Butterfield.) Aquino said that the reason they started an all-women organization was that "men were out working and can't be bothered with an organization." For a time, it was one of the only organizations providing social services for the Seattle Native American community. The organization received assistance from anthropologist Erna Gunther and canvassed neighborhoods for Native families.

Following a meeting of Native American organizations in 1960, it was decided that the most important issue that the groups were facing was communication. The AIWSL founded the publication Indian Center News in 1960. From 1960 to 1970, Aquino took on the responsibility of publishing the newspaper, learning to devise layouts and use a mimeograph machine. She was then editor of the Northwest Indian News from 1970 to 1980 and wrote the newspaper's "Teepee Talk" column. Aquino later brought the "Teepee Talk" column to radio, with a weekly program for Native American issues airing in the late 1970s on KRAB-FM (now KSER). She was also a broadcaster with the television station Native Vision.

AIWSL founded the Seattle Indian Center in 1960. Aquino instigated the expansion of the Seattle Indian Center. During a community debate about the expansion, members of the Asian community were opposed to the expansion, the main speaker for the Asian community announced that he could not argue against it because Aquino had been his foster mother.

Aquino was a matriarch of the Seattle Native American community and participated in the struggle to get the federal government to recognize treaty rights, including fishing rights. During the civil disobedience protests that came to be known as the Fish Wars, Aquino was a key figure in early organizing efforts. She advocated on behalf of the Puyallup tribe's efforts to regain title to their land.

=== Occupation of Fort Lawton ===
In 1970, it was announced that Fort Lawton, a United States Army post overlooking the Puget Sound, was to be decommissioned. Native American groups asserted that the property should be returned to them, citing 1865 treaties guaranteeing "the reversion of surplus military land to their original landowners". As it seemed unlikely that the land would be returned, some Native American groups proposed that direct action be taken. Inspired by the ongoing occupation of Alcatraz, Aquino helped to plan a non-violent occupation of Fort Lawton alongside Bernie Whitebear, Ramona Bennett and Joyce Reyes.

Aquino spearheaded efforts to recover land that was part of Fort Lawton and the Cushman Hospital in 1970. On March 8, 1970, as activists faced off against the police and National Guard, Aquino scaled the hill and climbed over a barbed wire fence. A photograph taken of her led to her being called "Give 'em hella Ella". The occupation ultimately led to the city of Seattle agreeing to lease 20 acres of the Fort Lawton property to the United Indians of All Tribes. The Daybreak Star Cultural Center was established in Discovery Park in 1977.

== Later life ==
In 1973, Aquino was recognized by the City of Seattle for being "one of the beautiful activists" of the city. She received her GED in 1982, graduating alongside her grandson. She and fellow AIWSL member Tillie Cavanaugh were called the "Road Runners", visiting spiritual conferences and meeting with other Native American Catholics around the United States to advocate for the canonization of the Algonquin–Mohawk woman Kateri Tekakwitha.

In 1984, Aquino and her friend Jeanie Raymond travelled to Nicaragua on a trip organized by El Centro de la Raza. That year she was honored by the Seattle chapter of the United Nations Foundation for her activism and work. Aquino was the subject of the 1987 documentary Princess of the Pow Wow.

Aquino died in 1988. She is buried at Gethsemane in Federal Way on the same property where she attended boarding school.

== Personal life ==
Aquino married Clarence Owen Ringer, an emigrant from England. They had three children before he died in 1937. She married Guellina "George" Rosario Aquino, an emigrant from the Philippines in 1944. She had six children of her own and fostered many children of color.
