= Tulee v. Washington =

- Supreme Court of the United States

Argued March 3, 1942 Decided March 30, 1942
- Full case name: Sampson Tulee v. State of Washington
- Citations: 315 U.S. 681 (more) 62 S. Ct. 862; 86 L. Ed. 1115; 1942 U.S. LEXIS 784

Case history
- Prior: State v. Tulee, 7 Wash.2d 124, 109 P.2d 280 (Wash. 1941)

Holding
- The Washington statute prescribing license fees for fishing is invalid as applied to a Yakima Indian convicted on a charge of catching salmon with a net without first having obtained a license, in view of the Treaty with Yakima Indians securing to them the exclusive right of taking fish in all streams running through or bordering reservation and right of taking fish at all usual and accustomed places in common with citizens of Washington.

Court membership
- Chief Justice Harlan F. Stone Associate Justices Owen Roberts · Hugo Black; Stanley F. Reed · Felix Frankfurter; William O. Douglas · Frank Murphy; James F. Byrnes · Robert H. Jackson

Case opinion
- Majority: Black

Tulee v. Washington, 315 U.S. 681 (1942), was a United States Supreme Court case in which the Court held the Washington statute prescribing license fees for fishing is invalid as applied to a Yakama convicted on a charge of catching salmon with a net without first having obtained a license, in view of the 1855 treaty at the Walla Walla Council securing to them the exclusive right of taking fish in all streams running through or bordering reservation and right of taking fish at all usual and accustomed places in common with citizens of Washington.

== Background ==
Sampson Tulee was a Yakama who was arrested in 1939 for fishing for salmon with a net, without a state license. Tulee contended that the 1855 treaty gave him the right to fish, while the state contended that this right was limited to the reservation. Tulee was convicted in state court and his conviction was affirmed at the Washington Supreme Court.

== Supreme Court ==
Justice Hugo Black delivered the opinion of the court. Black found that the terms of the treaty granted tribal members fishing rights both on and off of the reservation. The state was not allowed to charge fees for Indians to be able to exercise those rights. He noted that the court had clearly ruled on fishing rights in United States v. Winans in 1905 and in Seufert Bros. Co. v. United States in 1919. The court therefore ruled that the state was without power to regulate tribal fishing.

== Subsequent developments ==
Although the tribe had won the case, they still faced discrimination from the state and from non-Indian commercial fishermen. It was not until 1974 when U.S. District Judge George Boldt ruled on the discrimination in United States v. Washington. He later ordered the United States Coast Guard to enforce his order that the state began to revise its methods, and the U.S. Supreme Court affirmed his decision in Washington v. Washington State Commercial Passenger Fishing Vessel Association (1979).
