= Joe De La Cruz =

Joe De La Cruz may refer to:

- Joe DeLaCruz, Native American leader in Washington, U.S.
- Joe De La Cruz (actor), Mexican-American character actor
