= Hank Adams =

Native American activist (1943–2020)

- Hank Adams in 1973
- Born: Henry Lyle Adams; May 16, 1943; Wolf Point, Montana, U.S.
- Died: December 21, 2020 (aged 77); Olympia, Washington, U.S.
- Other name: Yellow Eagle
- Citizenship: Assiniboine and Sioux Tribes of the Fort Peck Indian Reservation, United States
- Education: University of Washington
- Occupation: Native American rights activist
- Years active: 1960–2020
- Known for: Tactician, strategist, and negotiator of several key events including the Boldt Decision
- Movement: American Indian Movement
- Awards: American Indian Visionary Award, 2006; Jefferson Award for Public Service, 1981

Henry Lyle Adams (May 16, 1943 – December 21, 2020) was a Native American activist known as a successful strategist, tactician, and negotiator. He was instrumental in resolving several key conflicts between Native Americans and state and federal government officials after 1960. Born on a reservation in Montana and based in Washington state for much of his life, he participated in protests and negotiations in Washington, DC and Wounded Knee, South Dakota.

Adams was instrumental in working to assert and protect Native American fishing and hunting rights on traditional territories free of state restrictions. He fostered change through protests and court challenges. The ruling in United States v. Washington (1974), known as the Boldt Decision, upheld by the United States Supreme Court (1979), reaffirmed native treaty fishing rights on ceded territory. It resulted in tribes becoming the co-managers of salmon and other fishing resources with the state of Washington and reserving a portion of the annual harvest for them.

Adams participated in the American Indian Movement, including its occupation of the Department of Interior Building in Washington, DC in 1972 and in the 71-day standoff of the Wounded Knee incident in 1973. In both cases Adams played important roles in negotiating peaceful resolutions of volatile situations. He continued his work to press for tribal sovereignty, as well as with tribes to restore the role of their elders. In 2006 he was honored with the 'American Indian Visionary Award' by Indian Country Today.

== Early life and education ==
Adams was born to an Assiniboine family on the Fort Peck Indian Reservation in Montana on May 16, 1943. His birthplace was Wolf Point, Montana also known as Poverty Flats. His father Louis Adams, a bronc and bull rider, and his mother Jessie, a rodeo rider and horsewoman, divorced when he was young. The family was given an English surname when his grandfather, Two Hawk Boy, was sent away at age nine to Fort Peck Indian Boarding School, one of the Indian boarding schools established to assimilate Native American children into European-American society in the United States. He was renamed as John Adams, and his children retained the surname. Hank Adams, also known as Yellow Eagle, had one sister, Lois.

His family moved to Washington State toward the end of World War II. They settled in Taholah, Washington, part of the Quinault Indian Reservation on the Olympic Peninsula. While growing up, Adams regularly fished and worked as a fruit and vegetable picker on nearby farms, where he gained a strong work ethic. Adams was student-body president, editor of the school newspaper and yearbook, and played football and basketball at Moclips-Aloha High School in Moclips, Washington, graduating in 1961. He worked part of the time in a sawmill on the Quinault Reservation.

Adams attended the University of Washington for two years, from 1961 to 1963. While in school, he commuted to the Quinault Reservation to help combat a suicide epidemic. He left university in November 1963 immediately after the assassination of President John F. Kennedy and pursued full-time work on suicide prevention for Native American youth. That year also marked the start of his long partnership fighting for treaty rights with activist Billy Frank Jr. (Nisqually).

== Activism ==
Adams joined the National Indian Youth Council (NIYC) in 1963. While serving as Special Projects Director from 1963 to 1967, he met actor Marlon Brando, who later became involved in the Native American rights movement and supported protesters at several events. Adams organized a protest march for March 3, 1964 on Washington's capital Olympia, to call attention to the state's attempt to limit Indian treaty fishing rights. More than 1,000 Native Americans and supporters attended the event. He invited Brando to the event, whose visit garnered national media attention.

The day before the march, a "fish-in" protest in Washington state was organized at Franks Landing, the first of a series of civil disobedience actions Native Americans modeled on the sit-ins of the African American civil rights movement. Brando was arrested at the "fish-in" and was swiftly released.

In 1964 and 1965, Adams was active as the research secretary for the National Congress of American Indians. In April 1964, he refused to be inducted into the military unless traditional Indian treaty rights were honored by the federal government. Although his rebellion attracted media attention, he later served a two-year term in the Army from 1965 to 1967.

In 1968 Adams became the leader of the Survival of American Indians Association (SAIA). This collection of 200 members was concerned with protecting traditional Indian fishing rights, which were under pressure from sports and commercial fishermen and local governments. Native Americans asserted that their rights to fish superseded state regulations. Near the end of 1968, Adams became directly involved in the struggle and fought against state fishing regulation of Native Americans on the Nisqually River in Washington. This had been traditional Nisqually territory before the tribe ceded it to the United States. Adams was arrested several times for protest actions between 1968 and 1971. In 1971, he was shot in the stomach at point-blank range by a gunman during the Northwest Fish Wars. Sports fishermen were irate that Native Americans were challenging their fishing.

In 1968, Adams served on the national steering committee of the Poor People's Campaign, organized by Martin Luther King Jr. He was among the Native Americans in April 1968 who occupied the National Mall in Washington D.C. and "reached out across the racial divide in common cause with other poor people". Adams led a group of over 100 residents of Resurrection City, including Native Americans in tribal regalia, to the United States Supreme Court in Washington DC on May 29, 1968. His efforts resulted in 25 tribal leaders gaining entrance to the building, where they chanted and drummed during hours of waiting. They wanted to directly hand their complaint to the justices, but the latter declined to meet with them.

In 1968 and 1972, Adams sought the Republican nomination as candidate for the House of Representatives from Washington's 3rd congressional district. He was unsuccessful but supported Republican candidates.

In 1971, Adams wrote a 15-point proposal for national changes with the goal of establishing a "system of bilateral relationships between Indian tribes and the federal government." This was the basis of the Twenty Point Proposal that AIM and other organizations later submitted to federal officials in 1972 during the Trail of Broken Treaties events in Washington, DC.

=== Boldt Decision ===
Adams continued to work on the fishing rights issue, also lobbying representatives in Washington. He compiled and presented information critical to making the case for Native American fishing rights in the legal challenge United States v. Washington. This was settled in 1974 and is widely known as the Boldt Decision. At the trial, Adams served in the unprecedented role of lay lawyer, directly representing tribal fishermen in front of Judge Boldt at the United States District Court for the Western District of Washington.

The United States Supreme Court affirmed that Native Americans in the Northwest had the right to continue to fish in traditional territories and in traditional ways exempt from state restrictions. This included fishing at traditional grounds off the reservations. Adams was active on the issue as a strategist and worked in concert with Billy Frank Jr.

The courts acted to uphold the treaty-protected fishing rights. They empowered tribes to partner with the state of Washington to co-manage the salmon and other fishing resources.

Adams continued to work with issues related to the Boldt Decision throughout his lifetime.

=== Trail of Broken Treaties ===
Adams was active in the American Indian Movement (AIM) and accompanied members of AIM on their 1972 Trail of Broken Treaties protest caravan across the country. The protesters called for more sovereignty for indigenous American tribes. The Trail of Broken Treaties caravan stopped in Minneapolis, Minnesota where Adams drafted a proposal of Twenty Points, listing a series of demands. Angered by the refusal of the Nixon administration to meet with them, protesters conducted an unplanned occupation of the Bureau of Indian Affairs offices at the Department of Interior headquarters in Washington, D.C.

The group asked for a re-opening of treaty negotiations and asked for the federal judiciary to accept the Native American right to interpret treaties, and to abolish laws that threatened Indian sovereignty and life. Although Nixon's representatives did not accept this list, it established a record of goals for Native American sovereignty and self-determination. Adams's leadership and commitment to clarifying the key issues eventually helped to change government policy. Since then, federally recognized tribes have made gains in autonomy and self-governance, and Congress has passed legislation to support this.

=== Occupation of Main Interior Building ===
Adams was instrumental in saving Indian lives in two of the major Red Power protests of the early 1970s. During the occupation of Bureau of Indian Affairs offices in the Main Interior Building in 1972, Adams was the main negotiator on behalf of the Indians. During negotiations with the White House for the events that occurred during the takeover, Adams was key to gaining amnesty from prosecution for the protesters. Months later, Adams participated in the 1973 occupation of Wounded Knee (see below):

Red Power as a form of activism was not something that the National Indian Youth Council originated in the 1960s. Every generation of Indian people has fought valiantly against what has been happening to them.

— Hank Adams, Indian Self Rule (1986), Chapter 4: Activism and Red Power

=== Wounded Knee incident ===
In February 1973, AIM protesters led what became known as the Wounded Knee incident, a 71-day occupation protest within the Pine Ridge Indian Reservation in South Dakota. Adams helped to end the occupation in a peaceful manner. He was the intermediary between Frank Fools Crow, the head of the Lakota occupation, and representatives of President Richard Nixon's White House. Leonard Garment, the lead White House aide in resolving both the Interior building takeover and the Wounded Knee incident, said: "Hank Adams' role in the peaceful resolution of some very difficult problems is still vividly clear in my mind.". Adams worked mainly behind the scenes on both of these issues. Adams said of his work: "Some of the things you prevent from happening are as important as many of the things you are able concretely to achieve."

== Documentary work ==
In order to heighten awareness of the treaty fishing disputes in the Pacific Northwest, Adams produced As Long as the Rivers Run, a documentary film. Filmed between 1968 and 1970, this work documented the struggles between Native Americans and government officials during the Fish Wars, a series of actions where Indigenous Americans sought to uphold their fishing rights. Adams dedicated this film to his sister-in-law, Valerie Bridges, who died in a drowning incident while demonstrating for fishing rights.

External videos
- As Long as the Rivers Run on YouTube Originally released 1971, digitally re-mastered by Salmon Defense, run time 1:00:05

The film was shown in 1972 to occupiers of the Main Interior Building, BIA headquarters in Washington, D.C. Adams later said that since the film showed violence against Native American women during protests, it may have contributed to the occupiers trashing the Interior building.

As Long as the Rivers Run was digitally remastered and made available to the public after it was acquired by the nonprofit organization Salmon Defense.

== Legacy ==
Adams was considered by many in the Indian community as one of the most influential people in the movement. Leonard Garment, the lead White House aide in resolving both the BIA occupation and Wounded Knee incident, said of Adams: "Hank Adams' role in the peaceful resolution of some very difficult problems is still vividly clear in my mind."

Vine Deloria Jr. (Standing Rock Sioux), an historian, major Native American writer, and rights activist, said Adams was one of the most important Indians of the last 60 years.

Adams was a member of the Franks Landing Indian Community of the Nisqually people. He died on December 21, 2020, in Olympia, Washington.

On May 16, 2024, he was honored with a Google Doodle.

== Honors ==
- The American Institute for Public Service honored Adams in 1981 with a Jefferson Award for Public Service.
- Adams received an Abraham Lincoln Award from the National Education Association in 1971 for "courageous actions in support of equal opportunity" and for his "tireless activism".
- In 2006 he was honored with the American Indian Visionary Award by Indian Country Today, the third person to receive the award.
- On May 16, 2024, a Google Doodle was created to celebrate his commitment to social justice and the environment.
