= Joe DeLaCruz =

Quinalut tribal leader (1937–2000)

Joe DeLaCruz (Joseph B. DeLaCruz, July 16, 1937 – April 16, 2000) was a Native American leader in Washington, U.S., president for 22 years of the Quinault Tribe. He was reputed for his "thorough, in-depth knowledge of probably every Indian tribe in North America." According to Suzan Harjo, "His programs became models for Native Americans everywhere."

== Life ==
DeLaCruz grew up on the Quinault Reservation in Taholah Grays Harbor County, Washington, the eldest of 10 children. In high school he was student-body president and a four-sport athlete. He fished in the summers with his grandfather on the Quinault River, drove a school bus and worked at the local lumber mill.

He served two years in the United States Army in Germany, then attended Portland State University in Portland, Oregon, after which he took a federal government job in that city. In 1967, he came back to the reservation as tribal business manager, and in 1971 was elected tribal president, a position he held for 22 years.

DeLaCruz was significantly involved in the rising militancy among Native Americans in the early 1970s. He participated in the 1970 confrontations at Fort Lawton in Seattle, Washington that led to the founding of the United Indians of All Tribes Foundation and the Daybreak Star Cultural Center. He was one of the organizers of the 1971 protest that blocked logging roads at the Chow Chow Bridge against companies that were logging on tribal lands and demanded the right for the Quinaults to manage their own natural resources. He advocated for Native salmon fishing rights and rights to control their coastal beaches. Under his leadership, the Quinaults hired their own juvenile counselors, police officers and foresters. He was one of the architects of the Centennial Accord, which delineates the principles of government to government relationship between the tribes and the State of Washington.

He was elected president of the National Tribal Chairmen's Association (1977) president of the National Congress of American Indians (1981), serving four years in the latter post. From 1984 until his death, DeLaCruz served as chair of public policy at the Center for World Indigenous Studies.

After his 2000 death from a heart attack, he was memorialized by the establishment of the Joe DelaCruz Center for Advanced Studies in Tribal Government, a project of Northwest Indian Applied Research Institute (NIARI) at The Evergreen State College.
