= United States v. Winans =

- Supreme Court of the United States

Argued April 3–4, 1905 Decided May 15, 1905
- Full case name: United States v. Winans
- Citations: 198 U.S. 371 (more) 25 S. Ct. 662; 49 L. Ed. 1089; 1905 U.S. LEXIS 1110

Case history
- Prior: 73 F. 72 (C.C.D. Wash. 1896)

Holding
- Treaty includes the Indians' individual right to fishing, hunting and other privileges.

Court membership
- Chief Justice Melville Fuller Associate Justices John M. Harlan · David J. Brewer; Henry B. Brown · Edward D. White; Rufus W. Peckham · Joseph McKenna; Oliver W. Holmes Jr. · William R. Day

Case opinions
- Majority: McKenna, joined by Fuller, Harlan, Brewer, Brown, Peckham, Holmes, Day
- Dissent: White

Laws applied
- U.S. Const. art. II § 2 cl. 2 (The Treaty Clause)

United States v. Winans, 198 U.S. 371 (1905), was a U.S. Supreme Court case that held that the Treaty with the Yakima of 1855, negotiated and signed at the Walla Walla Council of 1855, as well as treaties similar to it, protected the Indians' rights to fishing, hunting and other privileges.

== Background ==
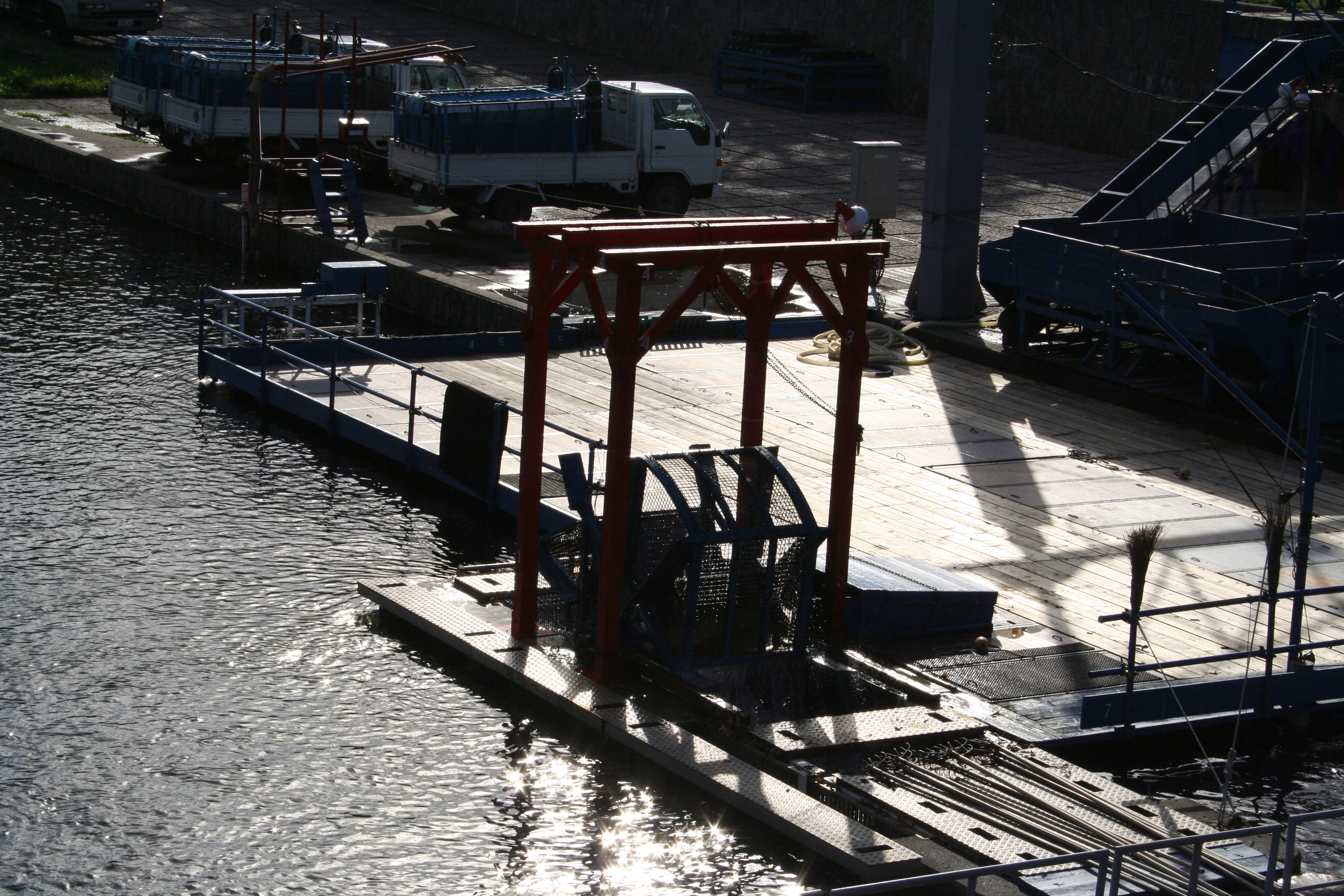
The Winans brothers operated a fish wheel, like this one, on homesteaded land near Celilo Falls.

In 1854 and 1855, the United States entered into a series of treaties with many of the Indian tribes of the Pacific Northwest. In exchange for Indian interest in certain lands in what is today the State of Washington, the Indians reserved relatively small parcels of land for their exclusive use (hence the term "reservation"), were given compensation in monetary payments, and other guarantees. The Treaty with the Yakima, signed on June 9, 1855, guaranteed to the Yakama "the right of taking fish at all usual and accustomed places in common with the citizens of the Territory".

In the 1890s, Lineas and Audubon Winans operated a state-licensed fishing operation on homesteaded land near Celilo Falls. Celilo Falls, in the Columbia River Gorge, was essential to the fishing practices of the Umatilla, Yakama and Nez Perce tribes. The Winans brothers obtained a license from the State of Washington to operate a fish wheel, a device that could catch salmon by the ton, thus depleting the Yakamas' fish supply. Most importantly for this case, the Winans brothers' actions also forcibly prevented the Yakama Indians from crossing the land recently purchased by the brothers, blocking their passage to the traditional fishing grounds of the tribe.

The legal dispute revolved around the treaty language that secured to the Indians "the right of taking fish at all usual and accustomed places in common with the citizens of the territory", Yakima Treaty of 1855, art. 3, ¶ 2, 12 Stat. 951. In 1905, the Supreme Court reaffirmed the off-reservation fishing rights possessed by the Yakama tribe: "The right to resort to the fishing places in controversy was a part of larger rights possessed by the Indians, upon the exercise of which there was not a shadow of impediment, and which were not much less necessary to the existence of the Indians than the atmosphere they breathed." Internationally recognized scholar on Native American issues, including tribal sovereignty, N. Bruce Duthu conveys that, although the arrival of settlers on Indian land called for a modification of rights Indians once possessed exclusively, the elimination of said rights was unlawful. Where Congress has inhibited fishing rights reserved under the treaties, or land or mineral rights (also treaty-reserved rights) are limited by private or government actors, tribes are often awarded monetary relief by the courts. Where private projects have obstructed treaty fishing rights, courts within the Ninth Circuit, however, have refused to pay monetary compensation to the tribes. The Indians brought suit to enjoin the respondents from using the fish wheel. The United States Circuit Court for the District of Washington ruled for the respondents on the basis of their exclusive rights to private property. The Supreme Court reversed.

== Legal analysis ==
The Court looked at the substance of the treaty and construed the disputed language as “that unlettered people understood it". In examining the negotiations with the Yakama nation, which was the largest of the Indian tribes, the District Court found that, "At the treaty council the United States negotiators promised, and the Indians understood, that the Yakamas would forever be able to continue the same off-reservation food gathering and fishing practices as to time, place, method, species and extent as they had or were exercising." In writing for the majority, Justice McKenna stated that a “Treaty between the United States and the Indians... is not a grant of rights to the Indians, but a grant of rights from them—a reservation of those granted." This established for the first time the so-called "reserved rights" doctrine in American Indian law. The Court noted the historical and traditional importance of fishing and hunting to the Indians, and viewed these rights as part of a larger bundle of rights preserved under the treaty.

The Court observed that the treaty foresaw the contingency of future ownership, and secured the Indians' rights and privileges both against the United States and its grantees and against the state and its grantees. Therefore, the grant of a license to operate a fish wheel gave the respondents no power to exclude the Indians from fishing. In other words, the State of Washington could not use common law property rights to absolutely exclude the Indians from fishing on the Columbia River.

Relying on its earlier decision in Shively v. Bowlby, 152 U.S. 1 (1894), the Court also dismissed the argument that the Indians’ treaty rights were subordinate to the powers acquired by the state upon its entry into the Union. The Court upheld the Indians' right of access to respondent's private property, thus protecting their privileges under the treaty.

== Dissent ==
Justice White was the lone dissenter, but did not write a dissenting opinion.

== Influence ==
United States v. Winans was an important case as it set two regulations regarding the way treaties would henceforth be interpreted. First, it was determined that a treaty must be analyzed as the Indians who had agreed to the treaty would have understood it and "as justice and reason demand." In studying the negotiations made with the Yakama Nation, by far the largest of Indian nations, the District court found, "At the treaty council the United States negotiators promised, and the Indians understood, that the Yakamas would forever be able to continue the same off-reservation food gathering and fishing practices as to time, place, method, species and extent as they had or were exercising."

Through United States v. Winans, the Reserved Rights Doctrine was also established, which states that treaties are not rights granted to the Indians, but rather "a reservation by the Indians of rights already possessed and not granted away by them".

Dr. David E. Wilkins writes in Uneven Ground: American Indian Sovereignty and Federal Law, "Tribes do not exercise rights because Congress granted them rights. Tribes exercise rights based on their original and indigenous sovereignty." These "reserved" rights, meaning never having been transferred to the United States or any other sovereign, include property rights, which include the rights to fish, hunt and gather, and political rights. Political rights reserved to the Indian nations include the power to regulate domestic relations, tax, administer justice, or exercise civil and criminal jurisdiction.

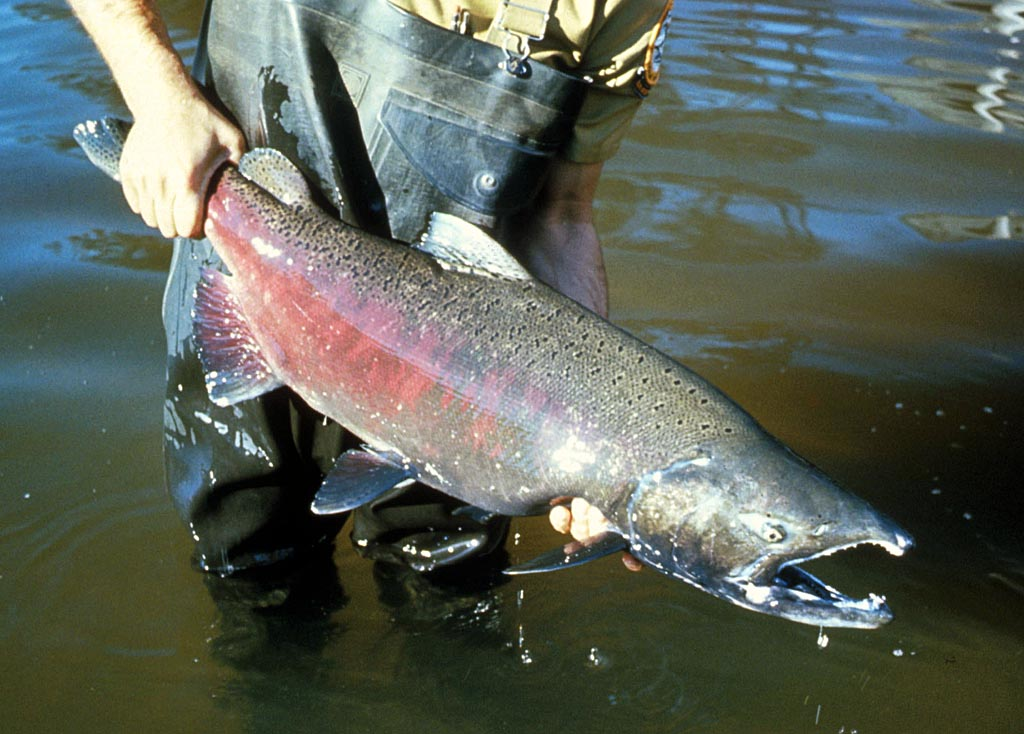
Salmon populations rapidly depleted and state officials further limited treaty fishing rights.

== Ensuing opposition ==
For the early part of the 20th century, treaty fishing rights were met with little opposition. In the 1942 Tulee v. Washington case, native fishing rights met their first major contest. In the case, Sampson Tulee was convicted of catching salmon with a net, without having first obtained a state license. Because of a treaty made between the federal government and the Yakima nation, Tulee claimed that it was unlawful for the state to require him to obtain a fishing license. The case was brought before the Supreme Court and the opinion was delivered by Justice Black. It was determined that, while a state could not require Indians to pay a license fee, they did have the power to "impose on the Indians equally with others such restrictions of a purely regulatory nature concerning the time and manner of fishing outside the reservation as are necessary for the conservation of fish".

In the second half of the 20th century, processing technology improved and commercial canning operations emerged. These industries rapidly depleted the salmon runs and the Indians' garnering of the salmon. In 1963 through the case Washington v. McCoy, tribal fishing laws were even further limited as Indians became the scapegoat for the decline in salmon populations. The ruling in Washington v. McCoy stated that the State of Washington had the power to regulate tribal fishing for conservation purposes.

By the early 1960s, state enforcement officials openly ignored the ruling and made numerous arrests, as well as confiscated boats and fishing equipment. Some Indians, in attempt to gain back their treaty fishing rights, ignored the new regulations laid down by the state. The Puyallup tribe of Washington were "primarily a piscatory people". Members of the Puyallup tribe, who ignored the regulations in attempt to gain back to fishing rights of their tribe were "met with arrests, beatings and confiscation of their gear and catch".

== Indian response ==
In blatant defiance to the Winans ruling of 1905, Washington state courts closed the Nisqually River to Indian fisherman in 1964. That same year, in attempt to preserve off-reservation fishing rights dubbed "reserved" in the Winans case, Native Americans formed the protest organization known as Survival of American Indians Association (SAIA). The SAIA organized protests, known as fish-ins, in which Native Americans as well as non-Indian activists illegally fished Washington waters, particularly at Frank's Landing on the Nisqually River. Johnson, Nagel and Champagne write in American Indian Activism: Alcatraz to the Longest Walk, that "A large number of state and local law enforcement officers raided Frank's Landing in 1965, smashing boats and fishing gear, slashing nets, and attacking Indian people, including women and children." Celebrities such as Marlon Brando, Jane Fonda, and Dick Gregory contributed acts of civil disobedience and traveled to "Frank's Landing and other sites of protest in Washington State to lend their presence to the struggle."

== Self-determination era ==
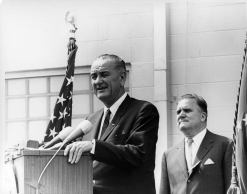
President Lyndon B. Johnson makes address.

In March 1966, Lyndon B. Johnson made a speech before the United States Senate in which he proposed a new era in regards to the nation's relationship with Native Americans. President Johnson asserted "a new goal for our Indian programs; a goal that ends the old debate about termination of Indian programs and stresses self-determination; a goal that erases old attitudes of paternalism and promotes partnership and self-help".

== See also ==
- Washington v. Confederated Bands and Tribes of the Yakima Indian Nation
