= Fort Lawton =

Coordinates: 47.66104°N 122.41479°W

- U.S. National Register of Historic Places
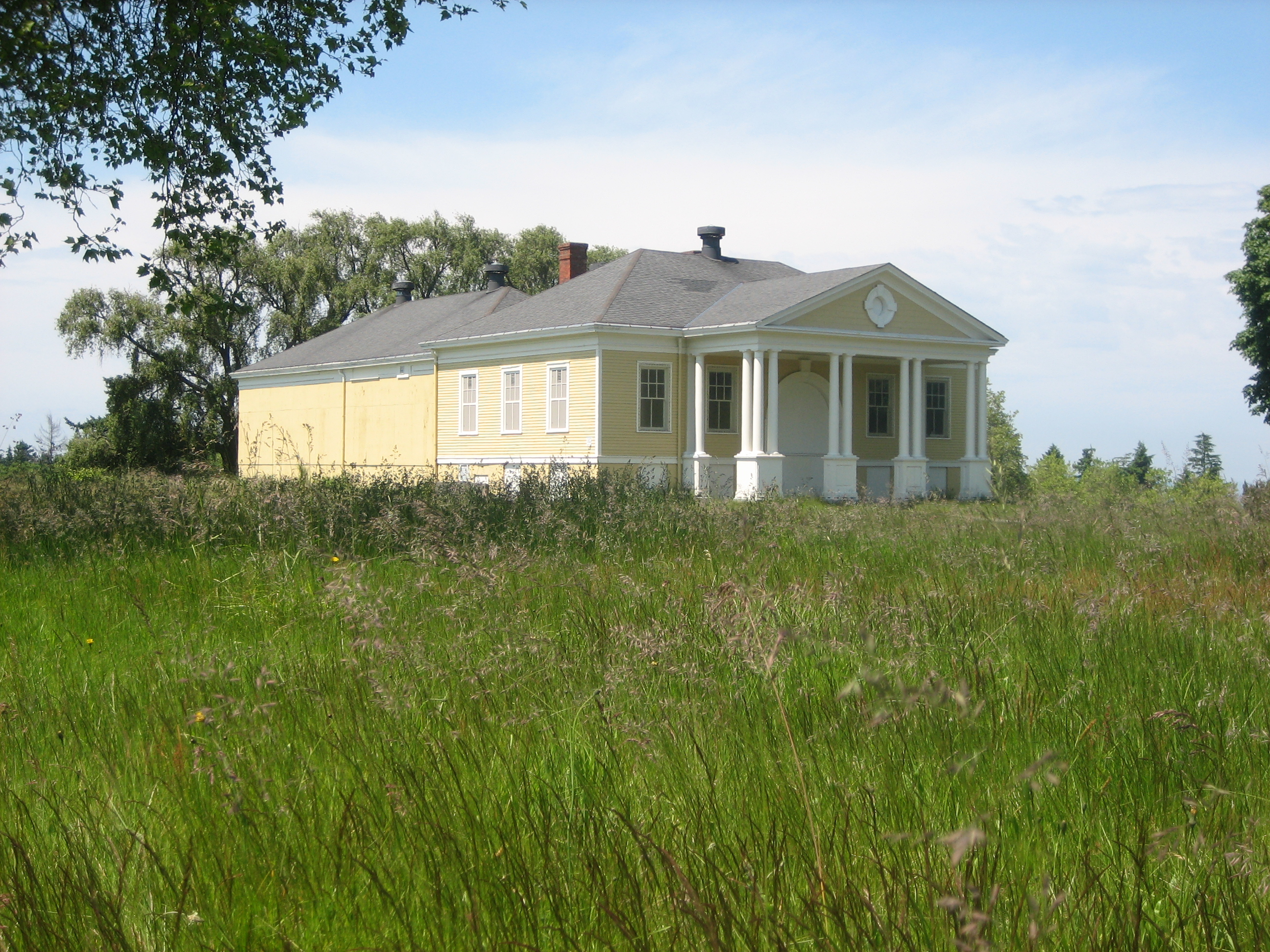
- Fort Lawton post exchange and gymnasium
- Location: Seattle, Washington
- Built: 1900–1917
- Architectural style: Colonial Revival
- NRHP reference No.: 78002752
- Added to NRHP: August 15, 1978

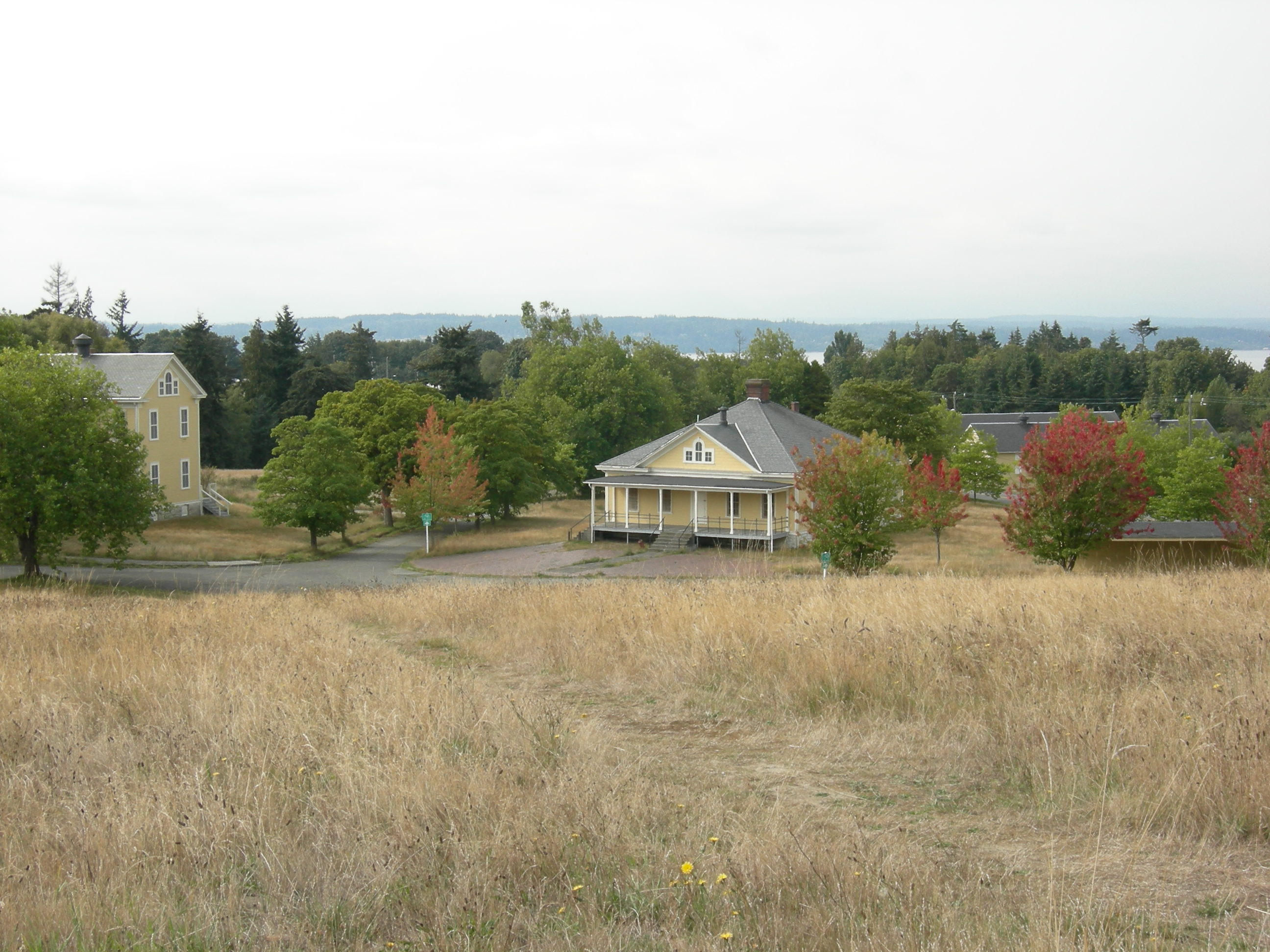
In the Historic District, looking toward Puget Sound. The visible buildings are, left to right, the Band Barracks, Guard House and Quartermasters Stables.

Fort Lawton was a United States Army post located in the Magnolia neighborhood of Seattle, Washington overlooking Puget Sound. In 1973 a large majority of the property, 534 acres of Fort Lawton, was given to the city of Seattle and dedicated as Discovery Park. Both the fort and the nearby residential neighborhood of Lawton Wood are named after Major General Henry Ware Lawton.

While Fort Lawton was a quiet outpost prior to World War II, it became the second largest port of embarkation of soldiers and materiel to the Pacific Theater during the war. The fort was included in the 2005 Base Realignment and Closure list. Fort Lawton officially closed on September 14, 2011.

== History ==
In 1896, the Secretary of Defense selected what would later be Fort Lawton for construction of an artillery battery intended to defend Seattle and the south Puget Sound from naval attack. Local citizens and governments donated 703 acres (2.84 km^{2}) land to the United States Army for the installation the next year. The subsequent establishments of the heavily armed Forts Worden, Casey, Flagler, and later Whitman closer to the entrance of Puget Sound made fortifying Fort Lawton unnecessary and no gun placements were ever built.

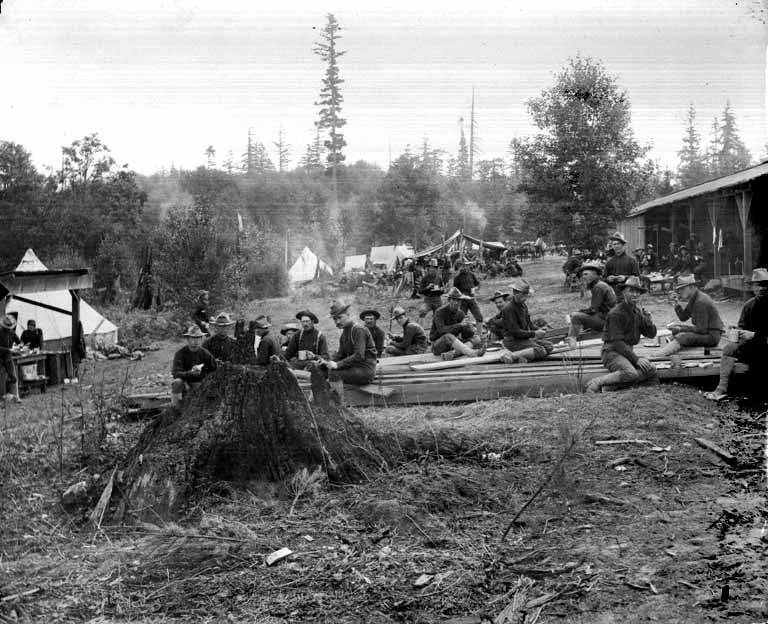
Soldiers taking a break at Fort Lawton in 1900 by Theodore E. Peiser

Fort Lawton was named by president William McKinley in honor of Major General Henry Ware Lawton (1843–1899), a veteran of the American Civil War, the Indian Wars, and Spanish–American War campaigns, who was killed in action in the Philippines. The fort opened on February 9, 1900 on a 1,100 acres (4.5 km^{2}).

The military encampment was redesigned in 1902 for infantry use. In 1910, a design overhaul, to include housing for officers and enlisted men, was prepared by landscape architect John C. Olmsted. In 1938 during the Great Depression, the Army offered to sell Fort Lawton back to the city of Seattle for one dollar, but the city declined, citing maintenance concerns.

=== Boxer Rebellion ===
Fort Lawton was used as a marshaling camp for soldiers preparing to travel to China to deal with the Boxer Rebellion. Seattle photographer Theodore E. Peiser photographed horse corrals, soldiers, and United States Army Transport ships that departed Seattle for Nome, Alaska, on their way to China.

=== Buffalo Soldiers ===
On October 5, 1909, the United States Army's 25th Infantry Regiment which primarily consisted of African American soldiers transferred from the Philippines to Fort Lawton. These men are known as the Buffalo Soldiers. The initial 900 men stationed at the fort and their families accounted for about a third of Seattle's African American population.

=== World War II ===
During World War II, at least 20,000 troops at a time were stationed at Fort Lawton, with more than 1 million troops passing through both before and after the war. It was the second-largest port of embarkation for US forces and material to the Pacific Theater during the war.

The post was also used as a prisoner-of-war camp, with more than 1,000 Germans imprisoned there. Approximately 5,000 Italians were passed through en route to Hawaii for imprisonment. On August 15, 1944 an Italian POW, Guglielmo Olivotto, was found murdered at Fort Lawton after a night of rioting between Italian POWs and American soldiers. Twenty-eight African-American soldiers were later court-martialed, convicted of the crime, and sent to prison. They and their families challenged the convictions; after an investigation, the convictions were set aside in 2007. A formal army apology ceremony was held on July 26, 2008; officials also presented the relatives of former US soldiers and the two remaining survivors with years of back pay, following the overturn of their dishonorable discharges.

On Memorial Day 1951, a grove of trees and monument honoring the war dead was dedicated near the post chapel. The Korean War brought a flurry of activity as troops headed to or returned from Korea were processed through Fort Lawton. In February 1953, the Fort Lawton Processing Center transferred half of its functions, the outbound tasks, to Fort Lewis (now called Joint Base Lewis McChord). Returnees continued to process through Fort Lawton.

In 1960, the Air Force established a radar station at Fort Lawton. Additionally, Nike anti-aircraft missiles and Air Force radars were in use at Fort Lawton, but in 1968 the site was rejected for proposed defense upgrades.

=== Native American occupation ===
In 1970, the fort was occupied for three weeks in March by a group of Native Americans, led by Bernie Whitebear, Ella Aquino, Sid Mills and Ramona Bennett, asserting that the Native Americans had claim to the land that was surplus to requirements. The Native Americans succeeded in garnering 40 acres of land and the establishment of the Daybreak Star Cultural Center, but 534 acres (2.16 km^{2}) of the land was declared surplus by the Army in 1971. The property was transferred back to the city in 1972, and dedicated as Discovery Park in 1973.

=== Closure ===
In 2005, the fort was included in the Base Realignment and Closure list for that year. Fort Lawton's family housing, consisting of the non-commissioned officer housing below and officer housing on the crown of the hill, has been used by the U.S. Navy for Navy and Coast Guard personnel for almost 40 years. They were purchased by a private developer, remodeled, and now in private ownership. The Capehart Housing in the center of the park was vacated by December 2009 and demolished during the summer of 2010; the land has become part of Discovery Park.

Fort Lawton officially closed on September 14, 2011, and the 364th Expeditionary Sustainment Command, the last U.S. Army Reserve tenant on the post, moved to its new facility in Marysville, Washington. A closing ceremony took place on February 25, 2012. The remainder of the fort property (with the exception of the military cemetery on site) was transferred to the City of Seattle in 2012. As of 2018, there are plans to convert the property into low-income housing. On 10 June 2019 the Seattle City Council voted to build 200-plus low-income and homeless housing units on part of the property but local residents sued to block such development.

== Historic district ==
The Fort Lawton Historic District (FLHD) in the heart of Discovery Park contains numerous historic buildings and structures that were once in, and part of, Fort Lawton. The following list includes only buildings and structures that survived at least into the 1980s.

Official structure number	Structure	Constructed	Comments	Image
417	Administration Building	1902		Administration Building
640	Double Officers Quarters	1904		
642	Double Officers Quarters	1904		
644	Double Officers Quarters	1904		
653	Air Defense Operations Building	1960	torn down 2008	
654	FAA Radar Building	c. 1959	torn down 2008	Radar buildings Building 672 and 670 can also be seen at left, and 640–644 at right.
655	FAA Radar Antenna Dome	c. 1959		Radar buildings Building 672 and 670 can also be seen at left, and 640–644 at right.
670	Single Officers Quarters	1904	Post commander's quarters	670-area housing
672	Double Officers Quarters	1899		670-area housing
676	Double Officers Quarters	1899		670-area housing
679	Double Officers Quarters	1899		670-area housing
681	Reviewing Stand	1900	Concrete foundation still extant	
730	Double Barracks	1904	Destroyed by fire February 13, 1983	
731	Double Barracks	1899	No longer exists	
S-732	Post Gymnasium	1942		
733	Post Exchange and Gymnasium	1905		Post Exchange and Gymnasium
734	Band Barracks	1904		Band Barracks
735	Bakehouse	1902	Bakery until c. 1938, offices until c. 1960, no longer exists	
754	Quartermaster Shops	1905	no longer exists	
755	Civilian Employees Quarters	1908		Civilian Employees Quarters and Quartermasters Stables
T-756	Commissary Warehouse	1939	no longer exists	
757	Quartermaster Storehouse	1899	no longer exists	
759	Guard House	1902		Guard House
T-760	Storehouse	1938	Used at some point as a garage for a fire truck, no longer exists	
T-761	Bus Stop	1949	Scenes from movie Expiration Date (released 2006), filmed at this location	Bus Stop
901	Double NCO Quarters	1933		900-area housing
902	Double NCO Quarters	1933		900-area housing
903	Double NCO Quarters	1904		900-area housing
904	Single Family NCO Quarters	1930s	Burned down approximately 2000	900-area housing
905	Double NCO Quarters	1899		900-area housing
906	Single NCO Quarters	1902	Former hospital steward's quarters; previously adjacent to post hospital, north east of administration building, moved to present location around WWII	900-area housing
907	Double NCO Quarters	1899		900-area housing
909	Double NCO Quarters	1904		900-area housing
915	Quartermaster Storehouse	1905	no longer exists	
915A	Addition to Quartermaster Storehouse	1939	no longer exists	
915B	Bulk Storage Warehouse	1938	no longer exists	
916	Quartermaster Stables	1908		Building 916
917	Quartermaster Stables	1902		Building 916
S-918	Post Engineer Facility and Vehicle Storage Building	1904	Later turned into a groundskeeper's building, no longer exists	

Source for buildings, construction dates, comments:

== The Chapel ==
Chapel-on-the-Hill, outside the Historic District, has the status of a city landmark. In July 2008, the City Council passed an ordinance that changed the boundary of the Fort Lawton Landmark District to include the Chapel and the Chapel Grounds.
