= Stevens Treaties =

The Stevens Treaties are a number of treaties signed by Governor Isaac Stevens for the United States, and Native American tribes in the then Washington Territory:

- Treaty of Hellgate (1855)
- Treaty of Medicine Creek (1854)
- Treaty of Neah Bay signed with the Makah (1855)
- Treaty of Point Elliott (1855)
- Point No Point Treaty (1855)
- Quinault Treaty (1855 and 1856)
- Treaty of Walla Walla (1855)
