= United States v. Washington =

1974 court case

- Court: United States Court of Appeals for the Ninth Circuit
- Full case name: Full name: United States of America, Plaintiff-Appellee, Quinault Tribe of Indians, et al., Intervenors-Plaintiffs, v. State of Washington, Defendant-Appellant, Thor C. Tollefson, Director, Washington State Department of Fisheries, et al., Intervenors-Defendants, Northwest Steelheaders Council of Trout Unlimited and Gary Ellis, Intervenor-Defendant-Appellant. United States of America, Plaintiff-Appellee, Quinault Tribe of Indians, et al., Intervenors-Plaintiffs, v. State of Washington, Defendant, Thor C. Tollefson, Director, Washington State Department of Fisheries, et al., Intervenors-Defendants, Washington Reef Net Owners Association, Intervenor-Defendant-Appellant. United States of America, Plaintiff, Quinault Tribe of Indians, et al., Intervenors-Plaintiffs, Muckleshoot Indian Tribe, Squaxin Island Tribe of Indians, Sauk-Suiattle Indian Tribe, Skokomish Indian Tribe, Stillaguamish Tribe of Indians, Quinault Tribe of Indians, on its own behalf and on behalf of the Queets Band of Indians, Makah Indian Tribe, Lummi Indian Tribe, Hoh Tribe of Indians, Confederated Tribes And Bands of The Yakima Indian Nation, Upper Skagit River Tribe, And Quileute Indian Tribe, Plaintiffs-Appellants, v. State of Washington, Defendant-Appellee, Thor C. Tollefson, Etc. et al., Intervenors-Defendants. United States of America, Plaintiff-Appellee, Quinault Tribe of Indians, et al., Intervenors-Plaintiffs, v. State of Washington, Defendant-Appellant, Thor C. Tollefson, Director, Washington State Department of Fisheries, et al., Intervenors-Defendants, Carl Crouse, Director of The Department of Game, The Washington State Game Commission, Intervenors-Defendants-Appellants. United States of America, Plaintiff-Appellee, Quinault Tribe of Indians, et al., Intervenors-Plaintiffs, v. State of Washington, Defendant-Appellant, Thor C. Tollefson, Director, Washington State Department of Fisheries, et al., Intervenors-Defendants, Thor C. Tollefson, Director, Washington State Department of Fisheries, Intervenor-Defendant-Appellant. United States of America, Plaintiff-Appellee, Quinault Tribe of Indians, et al., Plaintiffs, v. State of Washington, Defendant, Thor C. Tollefson, Director, Washington State Department of Fisheries, et al., Defendants, Washington Reef Net Owners Association, Defendant-Appellant. United States of America, Plaintiff, Quinault Tribe of Indians, et al., Plaintiffs, Puyallup Tribe of Puyallup Reservation, Plaintiff-Appellant, v. State of Washington, Defendant-Appellee, Thor C. Tollefson, Director, Washington State Department of Fisheries, et al., Defendants. United States of America, Plaintiff, Quinault Tribe of Indians, et al., Plaintiffs, Nisqually Indian Community of The Nisqually Reservation, Plaintiff-Appellant, v. State of Washington, Defendant-Appellee, Thor C. Tollefson, Director, Washington State Department of Fisheries, et al., Defendants
- Decided: June 4, 1975
- Citation: 520 F.2d 676

Case history
- Prior history: 384 F. Supp. 312 (W.D. Wash. 1974)
- Subsequent history: Cert. denied, 423 U.S. 1086 (1976).

Holding
- "[The] state could regulate fishing rights guaranteed to the Indians only to the extent necessary to preserve a particular species in a particular run; that trial court did not abuse its discretion in apportioning the opportunity to catch fish between whites and Indians on a 50-50 basis; that trial court properly excluded Indians' catch on their reservations from apportionment; and that certain tribes were properly recognized as descendants of treaty signatories and thus entitled to rights under the treaties. [Affirmed and remanded]."

Court membership
- Judges sitting: Herbert Choy, Alfred Goodwin, and District Judge James M. Burns (sitting by designation)

Case opinions
- Majority: Choy
- Concurrence: Burns

United States v. Washington, 384 F. Supp. 312 (W.D. Wash. 1974), aff'd, 520 F.2d 676 (9th Cir. 1975), commonly known as the Boldt Decision (from the name of the trial court judge, George Hugo Boldt), is a legal case in 1974 heard in the U.S. District Court for the Western District of Washington and the U.S. Court of Appeals for the Ninth Circuit. The case re-affirmed the rights of American Indian tribes in the state of Washington to co-manage and continue to harvest salmon and other fish under the terms of various treaties with the U.S. government. The tribes ceded their land to the United States but reserved the right to fish as they always had. This included their traditional locations off the designated reservations.

As the time went by, the State of Washington had infringed on the treaty rights of the tribes despite losing a series of court cases on the issue. Those cases provided the Indian tribal members a right of access through private property to their fishing locations, and said that the state could neither charge the Indians a fee to fish nor discriminate against the tribes in the method of fishing allowed. Those cases also provided for the Indian tribes rights to a fair and equitable share of the harvest. The Boldt decision further defined that reserved right, holding that the tribes were entitled to half the fish harvest each year.

In 1975, the Ninth Circuit Court of Appeals upheld Judge Boldt's ruling. The U.S. Supreme Court declined to hear the case. After the state refused to enforce the court order, Judge Boldt ordered the United States Coast Guard and federal law enforcement agencies to enforce his rulings. On July 2, 1979, the Supreme Court rejected a collateral attack (Note: A collateral attack is an indirect method of attempting to overturn a previous decision on procedural or jurisdictional grounds.) on the case, largely endorsing Judge Boldt's ruling and the opinion of the Ninth Circuit. In Washington v. Washington State Commercial Passenger Fishing Vessel Ass'n, Justice John Paul Stevens wrote that "[b]oth sides have a right, secured by treaty, to take a fair share of the available fish." The Supreme Court also endorsed Boldt's orders to enforce his rulings using federal law enforcement assets and the Coast Guard. The case remains active and is still litigated in 2026.

== Background ==
=== History of tribal fishing ===
The American Indians of the Pacific Northwest had long depended on the salmon harvest, a resource that allowed them to become among the wealthiest North American tribes. The salmon harvest for the Columbia River basin was estimated at 43,000,000 pounds (20,000,000 kg) annually, which provided sufficient salmon not only for the tribes' needs but also to trade with others. (Note: Meriwether Lewis and William Clark observed "over one hundred fishing stations" along the Columbia river alone. Clark wrote that the river "was crowded with salmon.") By the 1840s, tribes were trading salmon to the Hudson's Bay Company, which shipped the fish to New York, Great Britain, and other locations around the world.

=== Treaties ===
Map of Washington state showing locations of tribes

In the 1850s, the US government entered into a series of treaties with the American Indian tribes of the Pacific Northwest. In the Treaty of Olympia, Territorial Governor Isaac I. Stevens (Note: Stevens was the first territorial governor of the Washington Territory, and both he and Joel Palmer (territorial governor of Oregon) negotiated nine treaties.) agreed that the tribes had rights, including:

The right of taking fish at all usual and accustomed grounds and stations is secured to said Indians in common with all citizens of the Territory, and of erecting temporary houses for the purpose of curing the same; together with the privilege of hunting, gathering roots and berries, and pasturing their horses on all open and unclaimed lands. Provided, however, That they shall not take shell-fish from any beds staked or cultivated by citizens; and provided, also, that they shall alter all stallions not intended for breeding, and keep up and confine the stallions themselves.

Other agreements with area tribes included the treaties of Medicine Creek, Point Elliott, Neah Bay, and Point No Point. All of them had similar language on the rights of the tribes to fish outside the reservation. While the tribes agreed to part with their land, they insisted on protecting their fishing rights throughout the Washington Territory.

=== Post-treaty history ===
Initially, the federal government honored its treaties with the tribes, but with increasing numbers of white settlers moving into the area, the settlers began to infringe upon the fishing rights of the native tribes. By 1883, whites had established more than forty salmon canneries. In 1894, there were three canneries in the Puget Sound area; by 1905, there were twenty-four. The whites also began to use new techniques, which prevented a significant portion of the salmon from reaching the tribal fishing areas. When Washington Territory became a state in 1889, the legislature passed "laws to curtail tribal fishing in the name of 'conservation' but what some scholars described as being designed to protect white fisheries." (Note: Scholars included law professors such as Michael C. Blumm of Lewis & Clark Law School and Brett M. Swift of the University of Colorado School of Law.) The state legislature, by 1897, had banned the use of weirs, which were customarily used by Indians fishermen. The tribes turned to the courts for enforcement of their rights under the treaties.

==== United States v. Taylor ====
In one of the earliest of the enforcement cases, decided in 1887, the United States Indian agent and several members of the Yakama tribe (Note: Until the mid-1990s, the tribe spelled its name "Yakima", which is how it appears in court documents.) filed suit in territorial court to enforce their right of access to off-reservation fishing locations. Frank Taylor, a non-Indian settler, had obtained land from the United States and had fenced off the land, preventing access by the Yakama to their traditional fishing locations. Although the trial court (Note: The trial court was the Fourth Judicial District Court of the Territory of Washington.) ruled in Taylor's favor, the Supreme Court of the Territory of Washington reversed and held that the tribe had reserved its own rights to fish, thereby creating an easement or an equitable servitude of the land that was not extinguished when Taylor obtained title. (Note: The territorial Supreme Court also noted that any Indian treaty was to be construed in the favor of the Indians.)

==== United States v. Winans ====
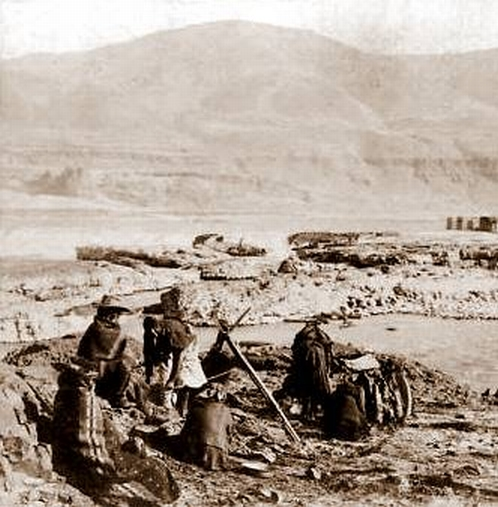
Indians drying salmon at Celilo Falls in 1900

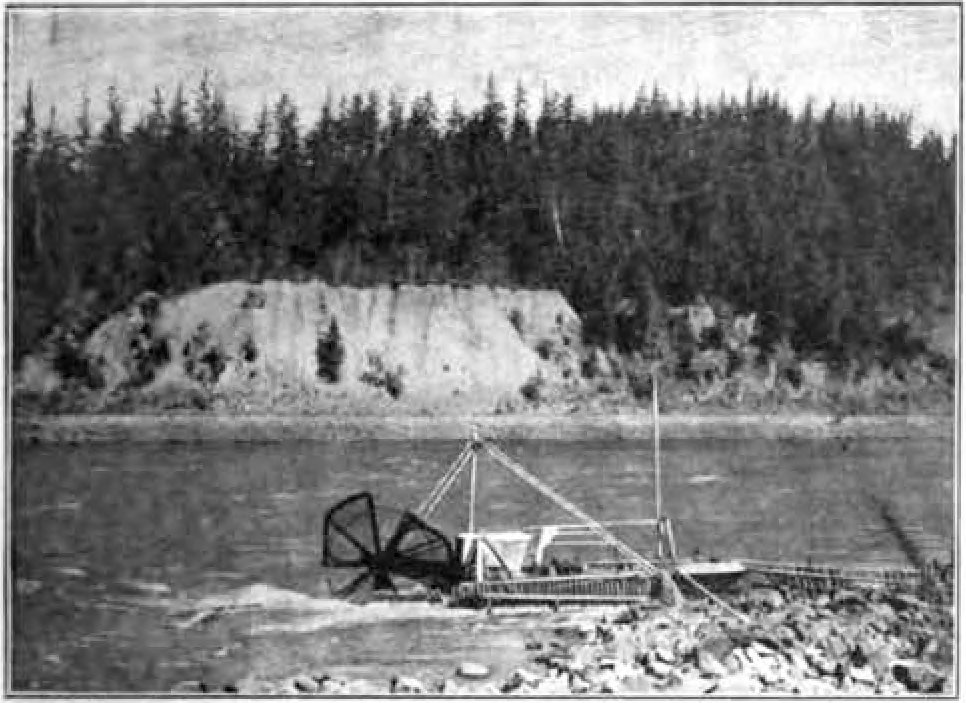
1907 photograph of a fish wheel in Oregon

Within ten years, another case arose, which dealt with fishing rights at Celilo Falls, a traditional Indian fishing location. Two brothers, Lineas and Audubon Winans, owned property on both sides of the Columbia River and obtained licenses from the State of Washington to operate four fish wheels. The wheels prevented a significant number of salmon from passing the location. Additionally, the Winans prohibited anyone, whether an Indian with treaty rights or otherwise, from crossing their land to get to the falls.

The United States Attorney for Washington then filed a suit to enforce the treaty rights of the tribe. (Note: Federal law imposes a duty on the United States Attorney to represent Indian tribes in lawsuits.) The trial court held that the property rights of the Winans allowed them to exclude others from the property, including Indians. In 1905, the United States Supreme Court reversed that decision by holding that the tribe had reserved fishing rights when they ceded the property to the United States. Since the tribes had the right to fish reserved in the treaties, the federal government and subsequent owners had no greater property rights than were granted by the treaties.

==== Seufert Bros. Co. v. United States ====
In 1914, the United States sued again, this time against the Seufert Brothers Company, which had prevented Yakama Indians including Sam Williams from fishing on the Oregon side of the Columbia River near the Celilo Falls. After the United States sued on behalf of Williams, the United States District Court in Oregon issued an injunction which the Supreme Court affirmed, again holding that the treaties created a servitude that ran with the land. The decision was significant in that it expanded the hunting and fishing rights outside the territory ceded by the tribes when it was shown that the tribe had used the area for hunting and fishing.

=== State attempts to regulate Indian tribes fishing ===
==== Tulee v. Washington ====
In Tulee v. Washington, the United States Supreme Court once again ruled on the treaty rights of the Yakama tribe. In 1939, Sampson Tulee, a Yakama, was arrested for fishing without a state fishing license. (Note: The issue appears to be that Tulee was using a dip net and was selling his catch. Fishing with a line and hook did not require a license.) The United States government immediately filed for a writ of habeas corpus on Tulee's behalf, which was denied on procedural grounds because he had not yet been tried in state court and had not exhausted his appeals. Tulee was convicted in state court, which was upheld by the Washington Supreme Court on the grounds that the state's sovereignty allowed it to impose a fee on Indians who were fishing outside the reservation. The United States Supreme Court reversed, stating "we are of the opinion that the state is without power to charge the Yakamas a fee for fishing".

==== Puyallup cases ====
Following the Tulee decision, there were three United States Supreme Court decisions involving the Puyallup tribe. (Note: These cases also involved civil disobedience by members of the tribes and others. Actor Marlon Brando was arrested with tribal leader Robert Satiacum during a fishing protest. So was comedian Dick Gregory (who then conducted a 39-day hunger strike).) The first was Puyallup Tribe v. Department of Game of Washington, (Puyallup I) (Note: The decisions were known as Puyallup I, Puyallup II, and Puyallup III.) which involved a state ban on the use of nets to catch steelhead trout and salmon. (Note: The tribe harvested Chinook, Coho (or silver), Chum, and pink salmon, in addition to the steelhead trout.) Despite the ban, the tribes continued to use nets based on their treaty rights. Justice William Douglas delivered the opinion of the court which said that the treaty did not prevent state regulations that were reasonable and necessary under a fish conservation scheme, provided the regulation was not discriminatory.

After being remanded to determine if the regulations were not discriminatory, the case returned to the United States Supreme Court in Department of Game of Washington v. Puyallup Tribe (Puyallyp II). Again, Justice Douglas wrote the opinion for the court, but this time he struck down the state restrictions as discriminatory. Douglas noted that the restrictions for catching steelhead trout with nets had remained, and was a method used only by the tribes, whereas hook and line fishing was allowed but was used only by non-tribal people. As such, the effect of the regulation allocated all of the steelhead trout fishing to sport anglers, and none to the tribes.

The third case, Puyallup Tribe, Inc. v. Department of Game of Washington (Puyallup III), was decided in 1977. Members of the Puyallup Tribe filed suit, arguing that under the doctrine of sovereign immunity, Washington state courts lacked jurisdiction to regulate fishing activities on tribal reservations. Writing for a majority of the court, Justice John Paul Stevens held that, despite the tribe's sovereign immunity, the state could regulate the harvest of steelhead trout in the portion of the river that ran through the Puyallup Reservation as long as the state could base its decision and apportionment on conservation grounds.

==== The Belloni decision ====
One year after the Puyallup I decision, Judge Robert C. Belloni issued an order in Sohappy v. Smith, a treaty fishing case involving the Yakama tribe and the state of Oregon. In this case, Oregon had discriminated against the Indian peoples in favor of sports and commercial fishermen, allocating almost nothing to the tribes at the headwaters of the river. Oregon argued that the treaties only gave the Indians the same rights as every other citizen, and Belloni noted that "[s]uch a reading would not seem unreasonable if all history, anthropology, biology, prior case law and the intention of the parties to the treaty were to be ignored". Belloni also found that:

The state may regulate fishing by non-Indians to achieve a wide variety of management or "conservation" objectives. Its selection of regulations to achieve these objectives is limited only by its own organic law and the standards of reasonableness required by the Fourteenth Amendment. But when it is regulating the federal right of Indians to take fish at their usual and accustomed places it does not have the same latitude in prescribing the management objectives and the regulatory means of achieving them. The state may not qualify the federal right by subordinating it to some other state objective or policy. It may use its police power only to the extent necessary to prevent the exercise of that right in a manner that will imperil the continued existence of the fish resource.

Belloni issued a final ruling that the tribes were entitled to a fair and equitable portion of the fish harvest. The court retained continuing jurisdiction, (Note: "The rule that a court retains power to enter and enforce a judgment over a party even though that party is no longer subject to a new action.") and his order was not appealed.

== U.S. District Court (Boldt decision) ==
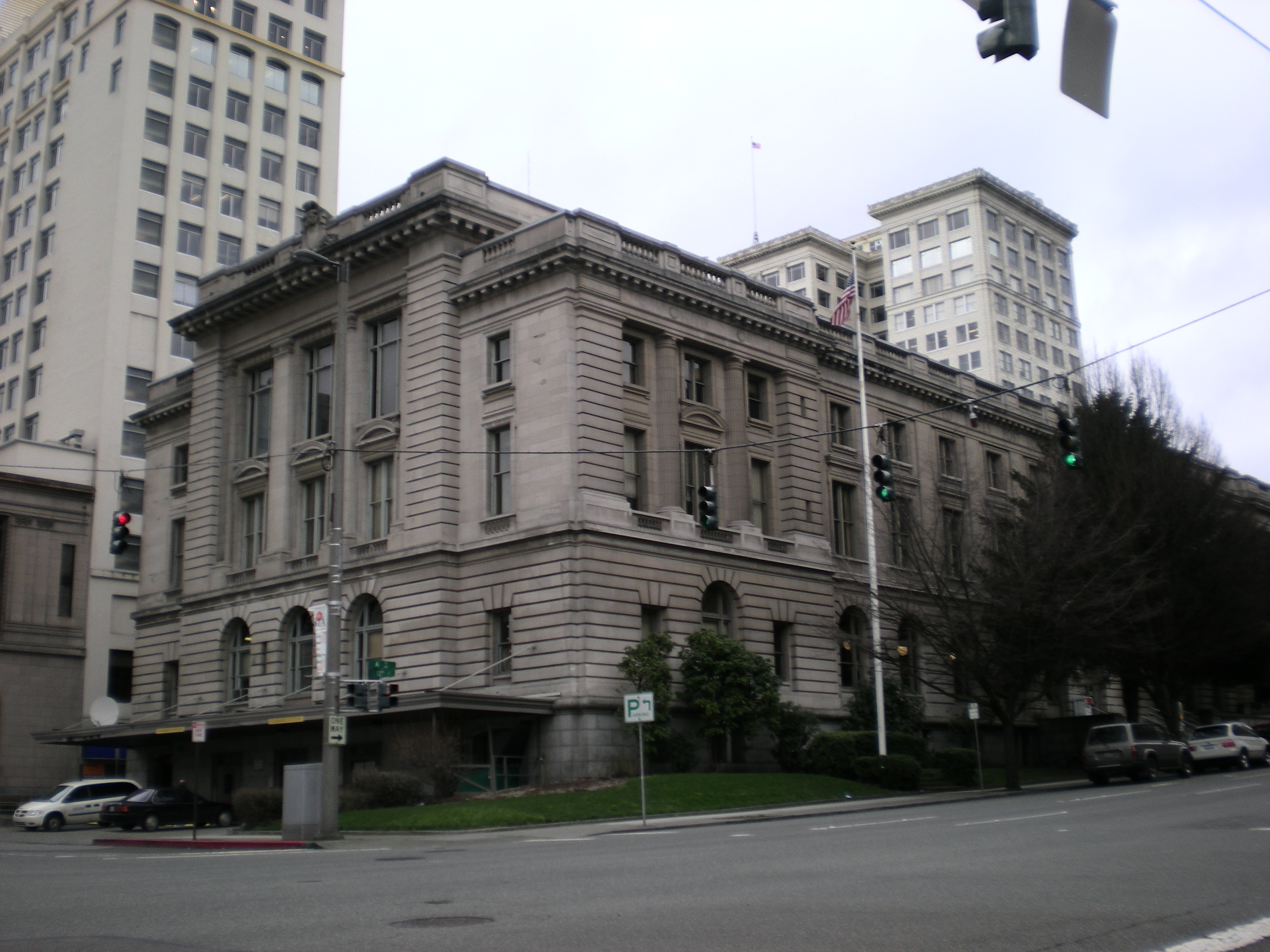
Tacoma federal courthouse that housed the U.S. District Court in 1974

=== Issue ===
Although the Belloni decision established the rights of the Indian tribes to exercise their treaty fishing rights, the States of Oregon and Washington continued to arrest tribal members for violations of state law and regulations that infringed on those rights. In September 1970, the United States Attorney filed an action in the United States District Court for the Western District of Washington alleging that Washington had infringed on the treaty rights of the Hoh, Makah, Muckleshoot, Nisqually, Puyallup, Quileute, and Skokomish tribes. Later, the Lummi, Quinault, Sauk-Suiattle, Squaxin Island, Stillaguamish, Upper Skagit, and Yakama tribes intervened in the case. Defendants were the State of Washington, the Washington Department of Fisheries, the Washington Game Commission, and the Washington Reef Net Owners Association.

=== Trial ===
The first phase of the case took three years, mainly in preparation for trial. During the trial, Boldt heard testimony from about 50 witnesses and admitted 350 exhibits. The evidence showed that the state had shut down many sites used by Indians for net fishing but allowed commercial net fishing elsewhere on the same run. At most, the tribes took only about 2% of the total harvest. There was no evidence presented by the state that showed any detrimental actions by the tribes toward the harvest. Both expert testimony and cultural testimony was presented, with tribal members relating the oral history dealing with the treaties and fishing rights. Additionally, Boldt found that the tribe's witnesses were more credible than those of the state and that the tribe's expert witnesses were "exceptionally well researched."

=== Holding ===
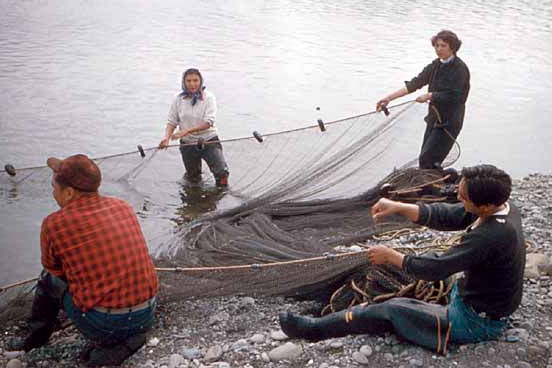
Men and women hauling a fishing net onto a beach on the Quileute Indian Reservation

The court held that when the tribes conveyed millions of acres of land in Washington State through a series of treaties signed in 1854 and 1855, they reserved the right to continue fishing. The court looked at the minutes of the treaty negotiations to interpret the meaning of the treaty language "in common with" (Note: "In common with" is a legal term of art, indicating joint ownership of the property or resource, in this case the salmon and other fish.) as the United States described it to the tribes, holding that the United States intended for there to be an equal sharing of the fish resource between the tribes and the settlers. As the court stated, the phrase means "sharing equally the opportunity to take fish... therefore, nontreaty fishermen shall have the opportunity to take up to 50% of the harvestable number of fish... and treaty right fishermen shall have the opportunity to take up to the same percentage." The formula used by Boldt gave the tribes 43% of the Puget Sound harvest, which was equivalent to 18% of the statewide harvest. (Note: "Judge Boldt excluded from this equal sharing formula fish harvested by tribes on reservations, fish not destined to pass the tribe's historic fishing sites, and fish caught outside Washington waters, even if they were bound for the tribe's fishing grounds.") The order required the state to limit the amount of fish taken by non-Indian commercial fishermen, causing a drop in their income from about $15,000–20,000 to $500–2000.

Furthermore, the court also held the state could regulate the Indian tribes' exercise of their treaty rights but only to ensure the "perpetuation of a run or of a species of fish." To regulate the tribes, the state must be able to show that conservation could not be achieved by regulating only the non-Indians, must not discriminate against the tribes, and must use appropriate due process.

== Ninth Circuit Court of Appeals ==
=== Opinion of the court ===
After the District Court issued its ruling, both sides submitted appeals to the United States Court of Appeals for the Ninth Circuit. Washington argued that the district court had no power to invalidate state fishing regulations, but the tribes argued that "the state may not regulate their fishing activities at treaty locations for any reason." Writing for a majority of the court, Circuit Court Judge Herbert Choy affirmed Judge Boldt's opinion "in all respects" but clarified that Judge Boldt's "equitable apportionment" of harvestable fish did not apply to "fish caught by non-Washington citizens outside the state's jurisdiction."

In his majority opinion, Judge Choy emphasized that states may not enact regulations that are "in conflict with treaties in force between the United States and the Indian nations." Consequently, he concluded that the treaties signed in the 1850s expressly preempted Washington's regulations and that non-Indian people had "only a limited right to fish at treaty places." Judge Choy also emphasized that the tribes were "entitled to an equitable apportionment of the opportunity to fish in order to safeguard their federal treaty rights" and that the Ninth Circuit should grant the district court a "great amount of discretion as a court of equity" when apportioning rights to fisheries. He held that the district court's apportionment "was well within its discretion" but clarified that tribes were not entitled to compensation for "unanticipated heavy fishing" that occurred off Washington's coast. Judge Choy also clarified that the district court's equitable remedy should attempt to minimize hardships for white reef net fishermen.

=== Concurrence ===
District court judge James M. Burns, sitting by designation, wrote a separate concurring opinion in which he criticized the "recalcitrance of Washington State officials" in their management of the state's fisheries. Judge Burns argued that Washington's recalcitrance forced Judge Boldt to act as "perpetual fishmaster" and noted that he "deplore[d]" situations in which district court judges are forced to act as "enduring managers of the fisheries, forests, and highways." In his concluding remarks, Judge Burns argued that Washington's responsibility to manage its natural resources "should neither escape notice nor be forgotten."

=== Certiorari denied ===
After the Ninth Circuit issued its ruling in the direct appeal, the case was remanded to the district court for further proceedings. Washington submitted an appeal to the Supreme Court of the United States, which denied the state's petition for certiorari and subsequent petition for rehearing. Despite the rulings, the parties in the original case continued to litigate issues relating to apportionment of the fisheries and subsequent rulings have been issued as recently as May 2015.

== Subsequent developments ==
=== Legal ===
==== Decades of subsequent litigation ====
Boldt's decision entitled tribes to collect half of fish from their usual and accustomed fishing grounds ("U&As"), as existed when the treaties were signed around 1855. Because the apportioned commercial fishing rights are highly valuable, this has led to decades of litigation as modern-day tribes dispute what grounds they fished at in 1855. The scarcity of actual evidence means that these disputes, which have increasingly become tribe vs. tribe, involve historical and anthropological debate over likely fishing habits hundreds of years ago. These further disputes, more than 80 in all, are called "sub-proceedings" and take on many characteristics of normal court cases while being tied to the original ancient case number, C70-9213. They continue to 2026, more than 50 years after Boldt's decision. Below are some (but not all).

==== Collateral attacks ====
After Boldt's decision, the Washington Department of Fisheries issued new regulations in compliance with the decision. The Puget Sound Gillnetters Association and the Washington State Commercial Passenger Fishing Vessel Association both filed lawsuits in state court to block the new regulations. These private concerns won at both the trial court (Note: The Thurston County Superior Court had held that the regulations were adopted due to the federal court ruling and had no basis in state law. The regulations were invalidated on those and other grounds.) and at the Washington Supreme Court. Washington Attorney General Slade Gorton, representing the State of Washington, supported the position of the private concerns and opposed the position of the United States and the tribes. The United States Supreme Court granted certiorari and vacated the decision of the Washington Supreme Court.

Justice John Paul Stevens announced the decision of the court, which upheld Judge Boldt's order and overturned the rulings of the state courts. Stevens explicitly stated that Boldt could issue the orders that he did: "[t]he federal court unquestionably has the power to enter the various orders that state official and private parties have chosen to ignore, and even to displace local enforcement of those orders if necessary to remedy the violations of federal law found by the court." (Note: Stevens went to the point of quoting the Ninth Circuit's comments condemning the actions of the State of Washington, which said: The state's extraordinary machinations in resisting the [1974] decree have forced the district court to take over a large share of the management of the state's fishery in order to enforce its decrees. Except for some desegregation cases. . ., the district court has faced the most concerted official and private efforts to frustrate a decree of a federal court witnessed in this century. The challenged orders in this appeal must be reviewed by this court in the context of events forced by litigants who offered the court no reasonable choice.)

==== Court supervision ====
When the state would not enforce his order to reduce the catch of non-Indian commercial fishermen, Boldt took direct action by placing the matter under federal supervision. The United States Coast Guard and the National Marine Fisheries Service were ordered to enforce the ruling and soon had boats in the water confronting violators. Some of the protesters rammed Coast Guard boats, and at least one member of the Coast Guard was shot. Those whom the officers caught breaking the court's orders were taken before federal magistrates and fined for contempt, and the illegal fishing as a protest stopped. The United States District Court continued to exercise continuing jurisdiction over the matter, determining traditional fishing locations and compiling major orders of the court.

==== Phase II ====
The case continued to have issues brought up before the district court. In what became known as "Phase II", District Judge William H. Orrick, Jr. heard the issues presented by the United States on behalf of the tribes. Following the hearing, Orrick enjoined the State of Washington from damaging the fish's habitat and included hatchery-raised fish in the allocation to the Indian tribes. The state appealed the decision to the Ninth Circuit, which affirmed in part and reversed in part, allowing the hatchery fish to remain in the allocation but leaving the habitat issue open.

==== Culvert case subproceeding ====
In 2001, 21 northwestern Washington tribes, joined by the United States filed a Request for Determination in U.S. District Court, asking the court to find that the state has a treaty-based duty to preserve fish runs and habitat sufficiently for the tribes to earn a "moderate living" and sought to compel the state to repair or replace culverts that impede salmon migration. On August 22, 2007, the district court issued a summary judgment order, holding that while culverts impeding anadromous fish migration are not the only factor diminishing their upstream habitat, in building and maintaining culverts that impede salmon migration, Washington State had diminished the size of salmon runs within the case area and thereby violated its obligation under the Stevens Treaties. On March 29, 2013, the court issued an injunction, ordering the state to significantly increase the effort for removing state-owned culverts that block habitat for salmon and steelhead and to replace the state-owned culverts that have the greatest adverse impact on the habitat of anadromous fish by 2030.

The State of Washington appealed the district court's decision to the Ninth Circuit Court of Appeals. On June 27, 2016, a three-judge panel of the Ninth Circuit affirmed the district court's decision and upheld the injunction. Washington State has estimated it will need to fix an average of 30 to 40 culverts a year to comply with the injunction.

The subproceeding was appealed to USA Supreme Court. In 2018 the Court issued a decision.

=== Public response ===
Scholars consider the Boldt decision to be a landmark case in American Indian law, in the area of co-operative management of resources, for Indian treaty rights, internationally for aboriginal treaty rights, and tribal civil rights.

The decision caused an immediate negative reaction from some citizens of Washington. Bumper stickers reading "Can Judge Boldt, Not Salmon" appeared, and Boldt was hanged in effigy at the federal courthouse. Non-Indian commercial fishermen ignored the ruling, and the state was reluctant or at times refused to enforce the law. (Note: It was alleged that Gorton's failure to support enforcement of Boldt's order led to the complete breakdown of law enforcement on state waters in Washington. Additionally, local prosecutors and state judges routinely dismissed any criminal charges against the non-Indian fishermen.) By 1978, Representative John E. Cunningham tried to get a bill passed to abrogate the treaties, to break up Indian tribal holdings, and stop giving the tribes "special consideration", but the effort failed. In 1984, Washington voters passed an initiative ending "special rights" for Indians, but the state refused to enforce it as being pre-empted by federal law.

United States v. Washington was a landmark case in terms of Native American civil rights and evoked strong emotions. According to former U.S. Representative Lloyd Meeds of Everett, "the fishing issue was to Washington state what busing was to the East" for African Americans during the Civil Rights Movement.

=== Tribal developments ===
The tribes involved benefited greatly from the decision. Prior to Boldt's ruling, Indian tribes collected less than 5% of the harvest, but by 1984, they were collecting 49%. Tribal members became successful commercial fishermen, even expanding to marine fishing as far away as Alaska. The tribes became co-managers of the fisheries along with the state, hiring fish biologists and staff to carry out those duties. The Makah tribe, based on the terms of the Neah Bay Treaty and the Boldt decision, took their first California gray whale in over 70 years in 1999. Following a lawsuit by various animal rights activists, the tribe was allocated the right to take up to five whales a year for the 2001 and 2002 seasons.

== See also ==
- Billy Frank Jr.
