= Billy Frank Jr. =

Native American rights activist

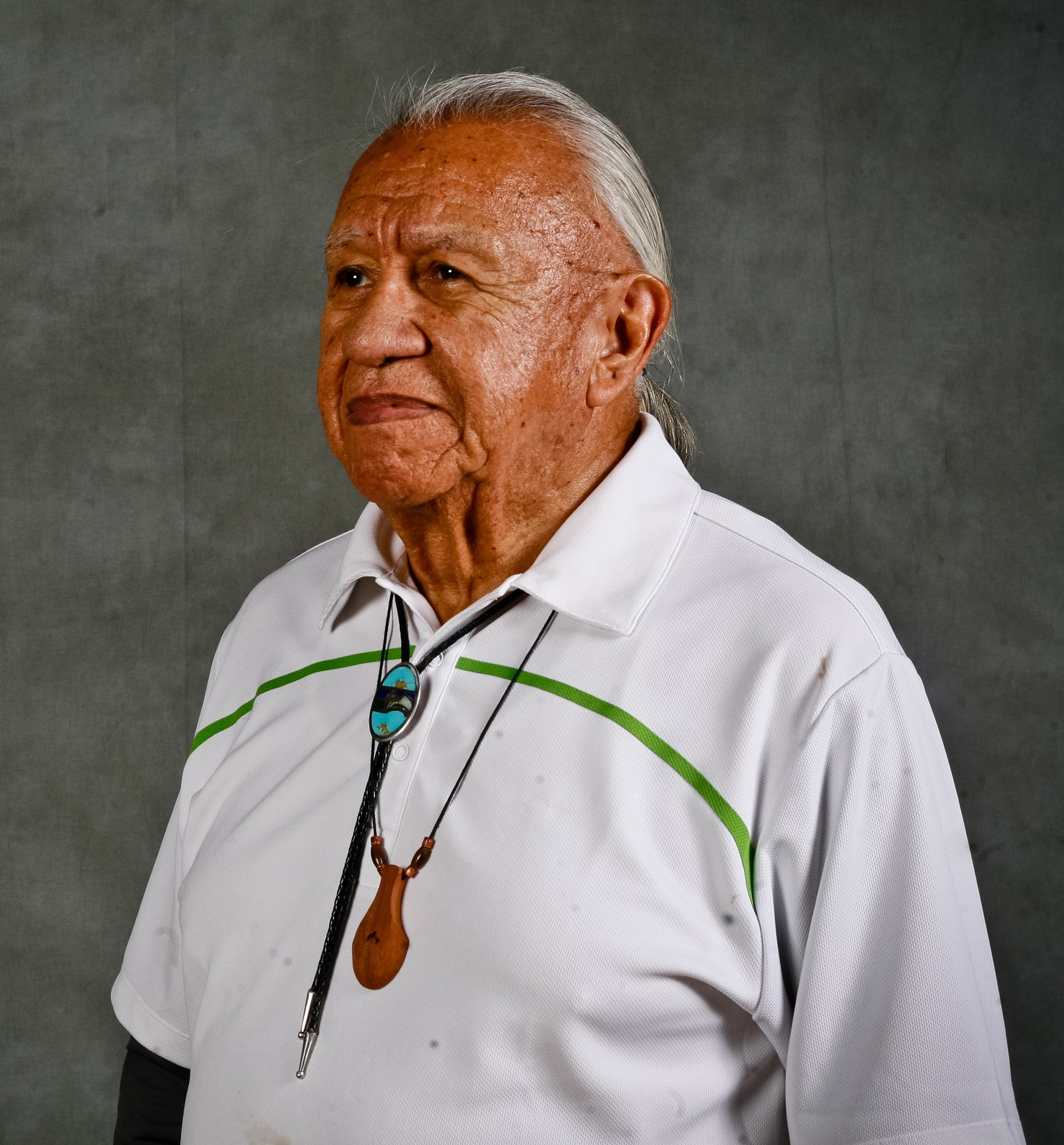
- Billy Frank Jr. at the 2012 Ecotrust Indigenous Leadership Award ceremony in Portland, Oregon
- Born: March 9, 1931; Nisqually Reservation, Washington, U.S.
- Died: May 5, 2014 (aged 83); Nisqually Reservation, Washington, U.S.
- Citizenship: Nisqually; United States
- Occupation: Native American rights activist
- Years active: 1960-2014
- Known for: Advocate of tribal fishing rights, leader of "fish-ins" during Fish Wars
- Relatives: Angeline Frank (mother); Willie Frank (father)
- Awards: Presidential Medal of Freedom

Billy Frank Jr. (March 9, 1931 – May 5, 2014) was a Native American (Nisqually) environmental leader and advocate of treaty rights. As a member of the Nisqually tribe, Frank led a grassroots campaign in the 1960s and 1970s to secure fishing rights on the Nisqually River, located in Washington state. His efforts centered around promoting cooperative management of natural resources. Frank served as the chairman of the Northwest Indian Fisheries Commission for over thirty years.

During the Fish Wars, Frank organized a series of "fish-ins." These events culminated in the Boldt Decision, which affirmed that Washington state tribes were entitled to fifty percent of the annual fish harvest.

In recognition of his contributions, Frank was posthumously awarded the Presidential Medal of Freedom by President Barack Obama in November 2015. The Nisqually National Wildlife Refuge was renamed in his honor in December 2015. Billy Frank Jr. continues to be considered a bridge between Western and Native American societies in regards to environmental sustainability.

== Early life ==
Billy Frank Junior was born on the Nisqually Reservation, Washington in 1931 to parents Willie and Angeline Frank. His father, known as Qui-Lash-Kut, lived to the age of 104, while his mother, Angeline, lived into her 90s. Frank spent his formative years on a six-acre property called Frank's Landing, situated along the Nisqually River. His father had purchased this land after the family's forced relocation from their reservation due to the expansion of an adjacent Army base. Frank received his education in Olympia, concluding his formal schooling upon completing the ninth grade. He subsequently worked in construction during the day and engaged in fishing during the night.

In 1952, at the age of 21, Frank joined the US Marine Corps, serving two years.

== Activism ==
Frank's journey as an activist began in 1945 when he was arrested at the age of 14 while fishing on the Nisqually River. Frank was fishing for salmon when two game wardens confronted him. Allegedly, they forcibly pressed his face into the mud as he resisted. This incident marked the start of Frank's involvement in civil disobedience. In the 1950s, his motivations for engaging in illegal fishing were not primarily politically driven, unlike other activists such as Robert Satiacum, who actively pursued legal cases related to illegal fishing.

In 1963, Frank formed a lasting partnership with Native rights activist and strategist Hank Adams.

"Fish-ins"

Based on treaties negotiated with the U.S. government in the 1850s, tribal nations in western Washington retained the right to fish, hunt, and gather shellfish at their customary places, shared with all U.S. citizens. However, when tribal members sought to exercise these treaty rights outside of reservations, they faced arrests for fishing in violation of state laws.

By the 1960s, salmon populations had significantly declined due to unregulated commercial fishing and the construction of hydroelectric infrastructure. Frank emerged as a key leader in the "fish-in" protests that unfolded during the Fish Wars of the 1960s and 1970s. These demonstrations gained nationwide attention and even attracted participation from celebrities; notably, actor Marlon Brando was arrested during one of these protests in 1964. "Fish-ins" were coordinated by the newly formed Survival of the American Indian Society (SAIA), a group in which Frank played a pivotal role as a founding member. The "fish-ins" drew inspiration from the civil rights movement in the southern United States, but were adapted to address the specific issue of fishing rights. The "fish-ins" reflected the Native Americans' rejection of cultural assimilation. The SAIA worked to reframe the history of Native American arrests related to fishing rights, extending their protests back to the 1930s. Frank was arrested over 50 times during the Fish Wars.

The tribal struggle eventually reached the U.S. courts, resulting in U.S. v. Washington. In 1974, federal judge George Hugo Boldt issued a ruling that favored the native tribes. Known as the Boldt Decision, it established the 20 treaty Indian tribes in western Washington as co-managers of the salmon resource alongside the State of Washington. The ruling reaffirmed tribal rights to fifty percent of the harvestable salmon returning to western Washington.

What initially began as a conflict over fishing quotas evolved into a movement for conservation and habitat protection. As a result of the efforts of Frank and other activists in the Fish Wars, tribal communities began working more closely with government officials in joint efforts to preserve natural resources. These foundations, coupled with the acknowledgment by United States government officials of tribal rights as defined in their treaties with the United States, fostered an intergovernmental partnership between the two groups.

== Northwest Indian Fisheries Commission ==
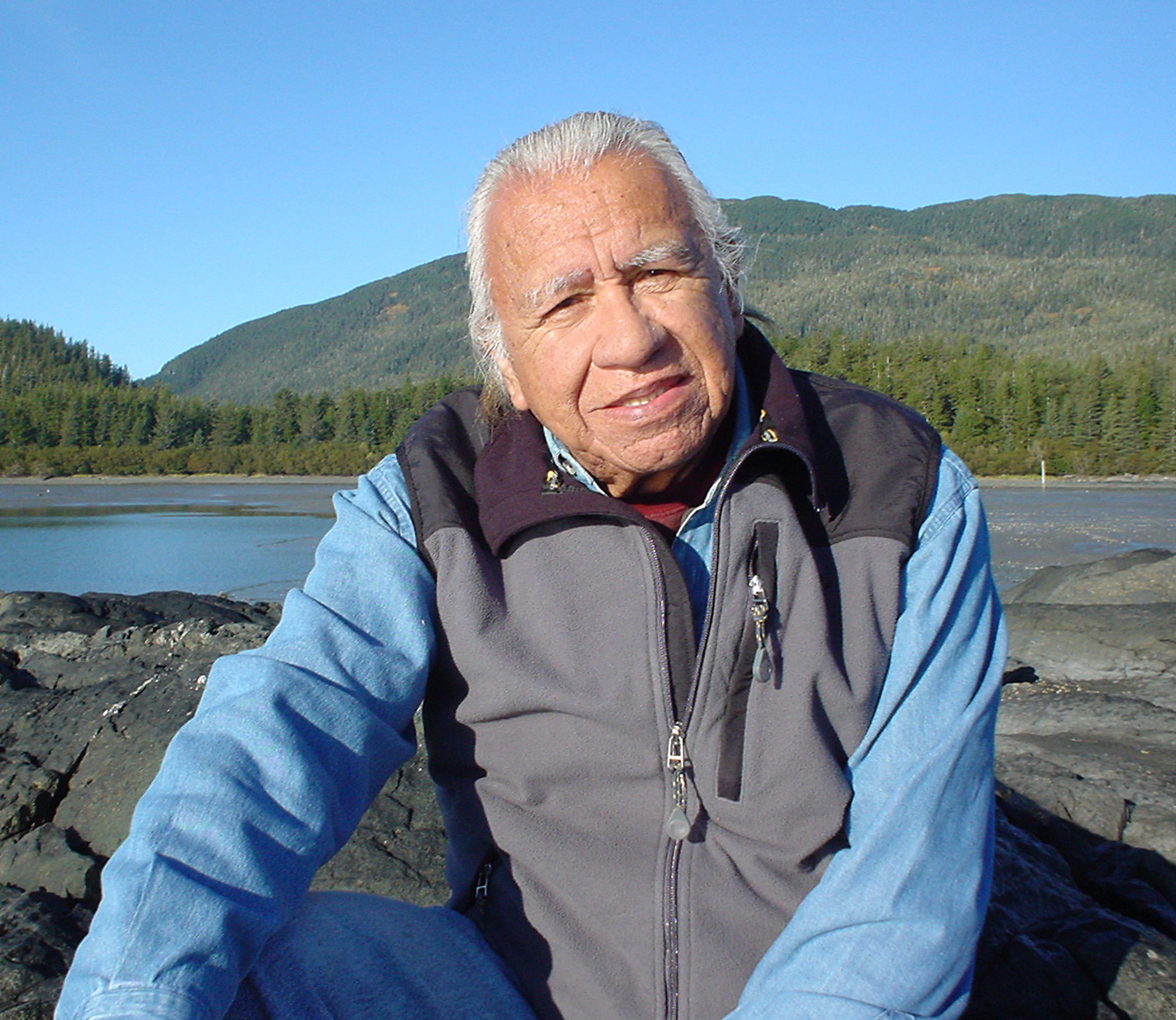
Billy Frank Jr. in 2006

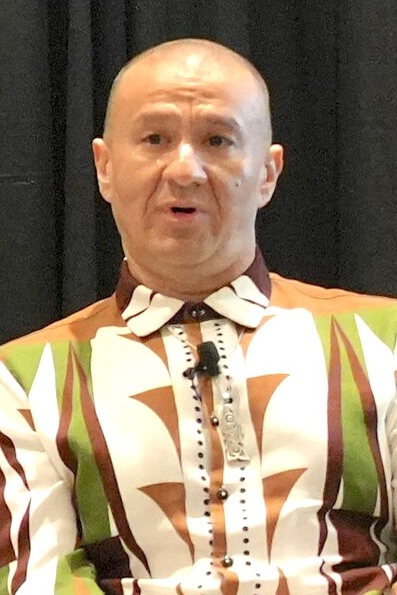
Son, Willie Frank III, chair of the Nisqually Tribal Council, (SXSW 2025)

In 1975, the Northwest Indian Fisheries Commission (NWIFC) was established to support the natural resource management activities of the 20 treaty Indian tribes in western Washington. Headquartered in Olympia, Washington, with additional offices in Forks and Mount Vernon, the NWIFC was chaired by Frank for over three decades, from 1981 until his passing on May 5, 2014. The commission's staff of 65 individuals assists member tribes in various endeavors, including fish health, salmon management planning, and habitat protection. Serving as a platform for tribes to address shared concerns, the NWIFC also serves as a mechanism for tribes to speak with a unified voice in Washington, D.C.

== Titles ==
Frank held several different titles in his career.

Positions held by Billy Frank Jr.
Term	Organization	Position	Ref
1975–1988	Nisqually Indian Tribe	Fisheries Manager	
1977 1981–2014	Northwest Indian Fisheries Commission (NWIFC)	Chairman	
1977–2014	NWIFC: Medicine Creek Treaty Area	Commissioner	
1996–2003	The Evergreen State College	Member of Board of Trustees	
2003–2014	Salmon Defense 501(c)3 whose mission is to "protect and defend Pacific Northwest salmon and salmon habitat."	Founding Board Member	

== Honors and awards ==
- Common Cause Award (1985), for his human rights efforts
- Washington State Environmental Excellence Award (1987), on behalf of the State Ecological Commission and other tribes.
- American Indian Distinguished Service Award (1989)
- Martin Luther King Jr. Distinguished Service Award (1990), for humanitarian achievement
- Albert Schweitzer Prize for Humanitarianism (1992)
- American Indian Visionary Award (2004), from Indian Country Today for "exceptional contributions to Indian American freedom."
- Dan Evans Stewardship Award (2006)
- Native American Leadership Award (2011), from National Congress of American Indians
- Seattle Aquarium Medal (2011)
- Washington state Medal of Merit (2015)
- In November 2015, Frank was posthumously awarded the Presidential Medal of Freedom by President Barack Obama in a ceremony at the White House.
- In 2015 the City of Bellingham changed the name of "Indian Street" near the Western Washington University campus to "Billy Frank Jr. Street".
- In 2023, the United States Navy announced that the future USNS Billy Frank Jr., a Navajo-class rescue and salvage ship would be named in honor or him.

== Legacy ==
On April 14, 2021, Washington Governor Jay Inslee signed a law to honor Frank with a statue in the National Statuary Hall Collection, to replace the statue of missionary Marcus Whitman. The bronze statue will be 9-foot (2.7 m) tall and depict Frank sitting on a riverbank with jumping salmon. It is planned to be sculpted by Hai Ying Wu and will be the first statue in the National Statuary Hall to depict a contemporary Native American as well as the first to be created by a Chinese American artist. A preliminary model was unveiled in 2024 and the statue is scheduled to be installed at the U.S. Capitol and State Capitol in 2025.
