= Fish Wars =

Native American fishing rights protests

The Fish Wars were a series of civil disobedience protests by Native American tribes in the Pacific Northwest region of the United States during the 1960s and 1970s. These protests, coordinated by tribes around the Puget Sound, pressured the U.S. government to recognize fishing rights granted by the Treaty of Medicine Creek. They protested by continuing to fish on their land while risking charges being pressed against them. This was done through a series of fish-in demonstrations in the Pacific Northwest, that started in 1963, grew to attract celebrity participation and national media attention before the US Federal Government intervened to sue the state of Washington. The 1974 decision in United States v. Washington was upheld by the US Supreme Court in 1979.

== History ==
Washington Territory, 1879; Nisqually reservation is shaded area on upper right

In 1855, two years after Washington was split from the Oregon Territory, the government of Washington signed various treaties with local tribes to compel natives to move onto reservations. Under the Point No Point Treaty, tribes on the Kitsap and Olympic Peninsulas had most of their land ceded to the United States, but retained rights to their traditional fishing areas. Some tribes resisted the loss of their farmland, leading to a series of armed skirmishes known as the Puget Sound War. By the end of the conflict, and for the next several decades, most of the treaties were largely forgotten or routinely ignored.

In 1916, the city of Tacoma donated 60,000 acres of land to the United States Army to build Fort Lewis. Two-thirds of the land came from the Nisqually reservation, including several miles of the Nisqually River. To preserve some of his traditional fishing areas, one of the residents of the reservation, Willy Frank Sr., bought a six-acre plot on the Nisqually River from Winthrop "Wint" Humphrey Bennett for $50 and moved his family to what would eventually be known as "Frank's Landing". For this act Willy Frank Sr. bestowed upon Winthrop the title of 'White Eagle.'

In 1937, a federal court granted a petition to prevent the state of Washington from interfering with native fishing rights, but there was no enforcement of the decision. Local authorities continued to police the water and issue citations and arrests.

In 1945, Willy Frank's 14-year-old son, Billy Frank, Jr., was arrested for fishing off reservation. This would prove to be the first of many confrontations between the younger Frank and state authorities. Before selling 'Frank's Landing,' to Will Frank Sr., Winthrop Bennett would disallow authorities to trespass through his land as they attempted to cite and remove Nisqually nets, requiring a warrant. In such time as it took to acquire a warrant, Winthrop would warn the Nisqually to remove their nets. And for this act of aiding the Nisqually and Willy Frank Sr., Fort Lewis condemned the Bennett property for which Winthrop, his two sons John and Sam along with his daughter Sissy left the Nisqually River Valley, friends and neighbors, which included the Bragets and Brown families.

In 1957, the Washington Supreme Court was split 4–4 on the issue regarding the arrest of Robert Satiacum, a Puyallup and Yakima man, for fishing steelhead with fixed gill nets out-of-season. Although a treaty had guaranteed Native people in the region the right to fish in their traditional ways, this arrest, and the others that occurred at the time, showed that the rights of the Natives had not been upheld or protected. Since the case was settled in the lower courts, and the judges found Satiacum guilty, the state was allowed to make decisions regarding the fishing and hunting of Native Americans.

By the early 1960s, state enforcement officials openly ignored the ruling and made numerous arrests, as well as confiscated boats and fishing equipment. This bleak situation in the early 1960s grew even worse in 1963 when Walter Neubrech, the head of the enforcement division of the Department of Game, provided a clear example of the negative image of Native Americans being put forward in the media. A Seattle Times article portrayed natives as the enemy in no uncertain terms. With a headline titled “Skagits on the Warpath?” the article printed claims by Neubrech that his enforcement officers had been shot at and threatened, and quoted him as saying, “They [the Indians] have been crowding us.” It reported a December incident in which two Native Americans had been caught illegally fishing on the Skagit River, having caught both steelhead and salmon in their 150-foot net.

== Demonstrations ==
Some native fishermen refused to obtain licenses or obey fish and game restrictions on certain fisheries, eventually setting up encampments along the shore illegal from the state's perspective but within the federal law and the 1854 Treaty of Medicine Creek. This Treaty gave the US government Native land in exchange for financial compensation, education, basic healthcare, and the right to fishing and harvesting the fish on their common territory. This treaty was a way for the Nation to continue expanding west and settling on new land. Often times, the terms of this treaty were not upheld and natives were not given the benefits they agreed to, and some were forced off their ancestral land and put on government-regulated reservations.

In 1963, the first fish-in was held at Frank's Landing downstream from the Nisqually Reservation, with the intent to protest the failure to follow through with the terms of the Treaty of Medicine Creek. By the end of the 1960s, Frank's Landing previously owned by Winthrop Humphrey Bennett as a ferry crossing under the name 'Bennett's Landing,' now owned by Billy Frank, Jr., had become a haven for unlicensed "fish-ins" in which, despite numerous arrests and convictions, fishermen would return to their fishing ground time and again, allowing themselves to be re-arrested for asserting their treaty rights. The fish-ins spread throughout Washington and Oregon.

By 1964, the dispute over fishing rights began to receive national media attention. Several celebrities took up the cause, including Marlon Brando, Buffy Sainte-Marie, and Dick Gregory. Brando was arrested in March 1964 for taking two steelhead trout as part of a protest with the Puyallup tribe. The movement also brought in other Native groups from outside the region, such as the National Indian Youth Council and Hank Adams from the Quinault Reservation.

In an attempt to calm the situation from being in the media spotlight surrounding the fish-ins, the State took action. Walter Neubrech, who was the Chief of the Enforcement Division of the Department of Game, released a press release in which he explained the small number of Native Americans involved in the protests. He stated in his press release that only 178 Indians were fishing beyond reservation boundaries in violation of state laws, which constituted less than 1% of the Indian population in the state of 18,000. Neubrech then said, “It has been very difficult for a law enforcement agency to maintain dignity and proper respect for the laws of the state of Washington in view of the tremendous amount of public attention that has been directed towards this Indian fishery off their reservation.” He then claimed the drop in fish population on the Puyallup River was solely due to the unrestricted commercial fishing practices of "three Indian brothers." Neubrech also warned the public in his press release of the possibility of Indians resorting to hunting deer and elk on national forest land. Neubrech final claim in his press release was that the Indian community is divided into "good" and "bad," with him saying, "A fair number [of Native Americans] fish commercially during established seasons in keeping with conservation laws. A large majority of the Indian people are gainfully employed and support their families in various trades and professions other than fishing.”

Not all of the actions were nonviolent. In September 1970, Puyallup fishermen on boats, armed with rifles, challenged police and fired warning shots when officials approached their nets. A fish-in leader named Many Dog Hides was quoted as saying, "It's a sad thing we have to bring guns out. But we are a dying people and have to fight for survival, as we have done for about 500 years." One protester threw a fire bomb onto a bridge to slow the game officials' advance, but police eventually raided the boats and camps and forcefully broke up the demonstrators with tear gas and clubs.

Finally, the U.S. federal government intervened, suing the state of Washington for failure to uphold its treaty agreement.

== Boldt Decision ==
In 1974's United States v. Washington ruling, U.S. District Court Judge George Hugo Boldt stated that treaty right fishermen must be allowed to take up to 50% of all potential fishing harvests, and required that they have an equal voice in the management of the fishery. He emphasized that no court decision or act of Congress had annulled what the treaties preserved for the Native tribes. He declared that when the Native people signed the Stevens Treaties, they had not secured a right from non-natives, but had agreed only to share their resources.

The so-called Boldt Decision was reaffirmed by the US Supreme Court in 1979 and has been used as a precedent for handling other similar treaties.

== Aftermath ==
Tempers flared again in 1976 when wildlife officials closed a number of fishing areas, ostensibly to allow the salmon population to recover. Some tribal members claimed the laws were intended to favor white fishermen, and refused to obey the new laws. A number of small riots and demonstrations ensued. By the mid-1980s, however, cooperation between the various tribes led to a stronger, unified presence in fisheries management under the terms of the Boldt Decision, effectively putting an end to the violence, though legal disputes continue.

Fish-ins became a gathering place of Native American activists, and many people were trained for the foundation of the Red Power movement, which led to the founding of the American Indian Movement in 1968 and the occupation of Alcatraz Island in 1969.
