= Fish wheel =

Device used in rivers to catch fish

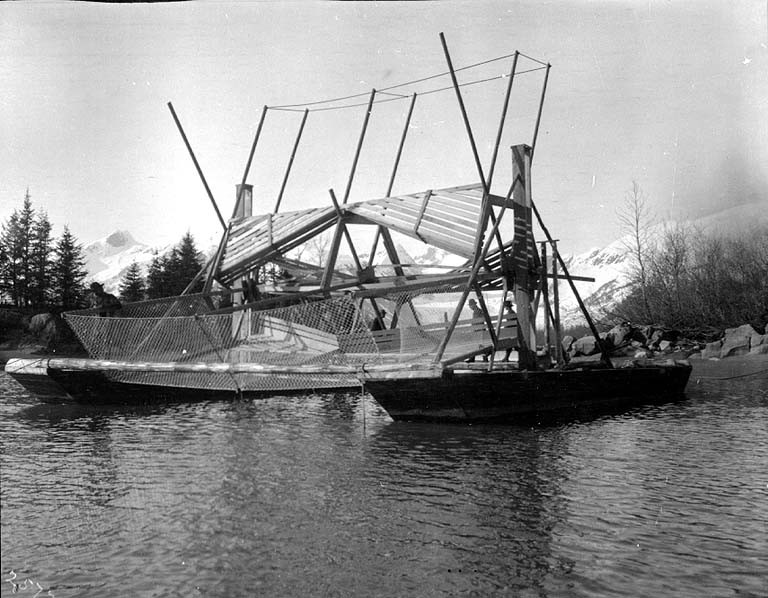
Fishwheel on the Taku River in Alaska, May 1908, photo by John Nathan Cobb

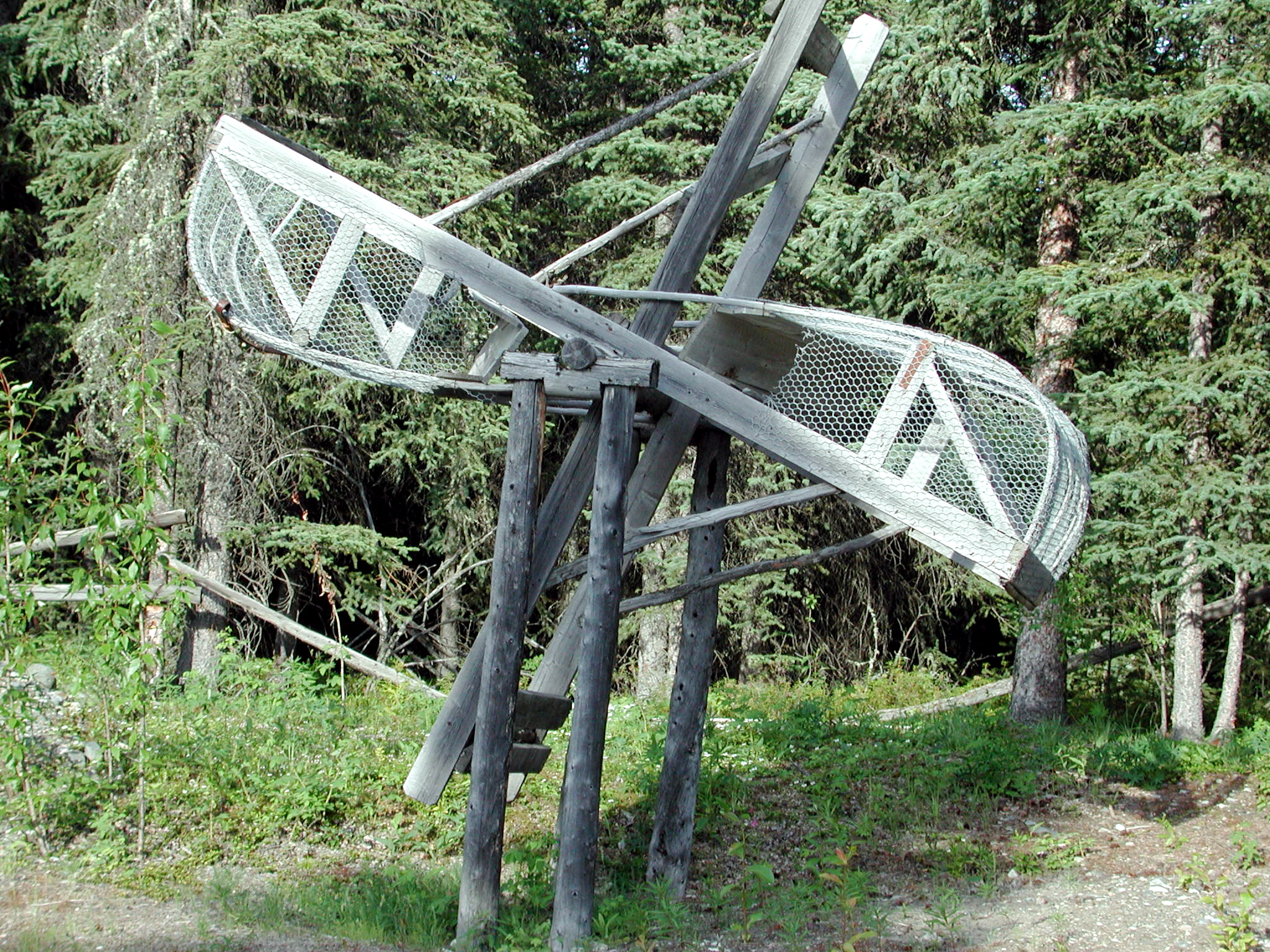
A wooden fish wheel out of the water.

A fish wheel, also known as a salmon wheel, is a device situated in rivers to catch fish which looks and operates like a watermill. However, in addition to paddles, a fish wheel is outfitted with wire baskets designed to catch and carry fish from the water and into a nearby holding tank. The current of the river presses against the submerged paddles and rotates the wheel, passing the baskets through the water where they intercept fish that are swimming or drifting. Naturally, a strong current is most effective in spinning the wheel, so fish wheels are typically situated in shallow rivers with brisk currents, close to rapids, or waterfalls. The baskets are built at an outward-facing slant with an open end so the fish slide out of the opening and into the holding tank where they await collection. Yield is increased if fish swimming upstream are channeled toward the wheel by weirs.

Fish wheels were used on the Columbia River in Oregon by large commercial operations in the early twentieth century until they were banned by the U.S. government for their contribution to destroying the salmon population (see below). The wheel's prevalent use in catching salmon, (in particular, salmon species Chinook, chum, coho, sockeye, and pink) and other anadromous species of fish, has given fish wheels their second name as salmon wheels. Although salmon were prioritized by commercial fishers and Indigenous peoples (albeit for different reasons,) other fish such as steelhead trout (Oncorhynchus mykiss irideus), ooligan (Thaleichthys pacificus), and Pacific lamprey (Entosphenus tridentatus) were also considered valuable catch. While the fish wheel is best known for its presence on the northwestern coast of North America, there is debate whether the technology arrived via Asian migrants who had come to labor in the gold fields, by Scottish and Russian migrants, or was a potentially Scandinavian invention sometime during the turn of the twentieth century.

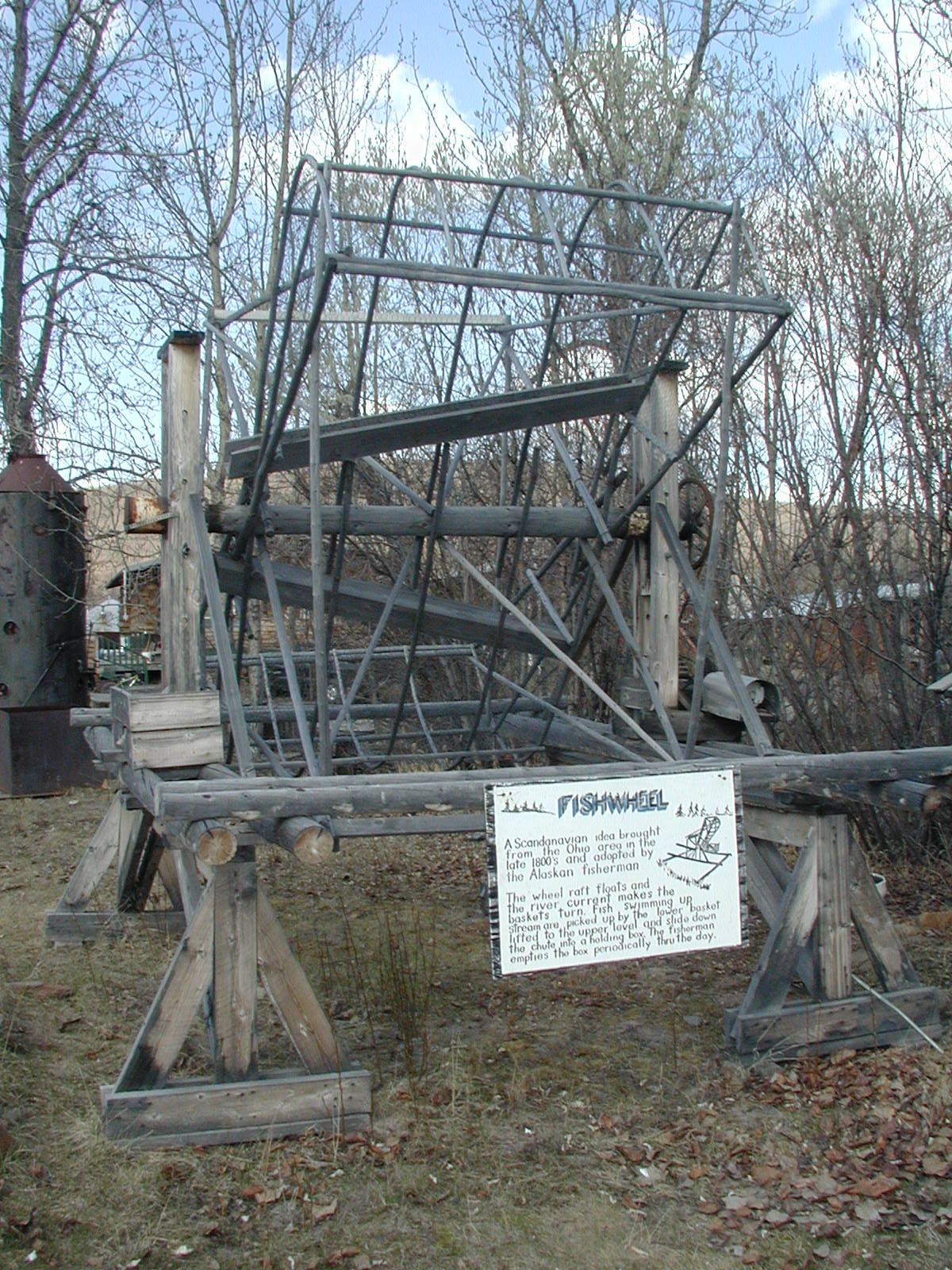
Fish wheel on display in Alaska. The sign reads that fish wheels originated in Scandinavia and were brought to Alaska by a man from Ohio in the late 1800s, but there is still debate over the wheel's origins

The advent of fish wheel technology in the early twentieth century also drew interest from various First Nations communities of northwestern North America, as well as dog-sledders. Ultimately, the efficacy of the wheel proved an excellent means of subsistence for hungry sled dogs and humans alike, and began to draw communities toward fertile rivers where they started using wheels to feed themselves. This changed routine hunting grounds for many communities including some Northern Athabaskans who began to place more emphasis on fishing than hunting.

Since this time, despite being a foreign technology, the fish wheel has become a culturally embedded tool for self-subsisting communities and Indigenous peoples of the northwestern area of North America; the latter of whom have incorporated it in some ways with their traditional ecological knowledge. Today, fish wheels are subject to regulations in Canada and the United States that restrict commercial applications and prioritize their use for subsistence in small off-grid communities and for conservation purposes.

== Salmon significance in northwestern North America ==
The implementation of fish wheels in the Pacific Northwest at the dawn of the twentieth century made salmon a lucrative commodity for new settlers, but they also significantly contributed to the destruction of various salmon populations along the coast. This not only impacted the environmental ecology of the area, but was also greatly problematic for the surrounding Indigenous communities, as salmon have long been a culturally embedded food and species for such First Nations peoples for many reasons that can be seen in their traditions of smoking salmon meat, to clothing used in rituals, and the prominent featuring of salmon in First Nations art. The unique life cycle of salmon—wherein the fish migrate from the ocean up rivers to spawn and die, and whose spawn repeats the cycle by returning to the ocean to mature—made for an interesting source of food, in particular because different species of salmon spawn at different times during the year, and in different rivers. Therefore, as a food not omnipresent throughout the year, the coming of new salmon journeying up rivers to spawn was a celebration. Despite the variance of cultural traditions between the many coastal tribes of the Northwest, this celebration, known as the First Salmon Ceremony, is a ceremony that all such communities share in common, and all rejoice in the return of the salmon. Such a dependence on the return of these fish made Indigenous communities of the coast sensitive to the healthy procreation of journeying salmon, and in this way, just as the return of salmon heralded a season of harvest, it also cautioned fishermen to reap only a selective number, so there was enough salmon left to spawn and ultimately return the following year. This model of seasonal adherence and moderation made for a dependably renewable food source, and a naturally sustainable relationship between people and salmon. With this in mind, traditional ecological knowledge of Indigenous peoples is increasingly becoming an important topic of conversation in addressing policy-related issues of environmental sustainability. Industrialized fishing brought about by Euro-American settlers in the late nineteenth century not only greatly disturbed the food sovereignty and food security of local Indigenous communities, but was interpreted by these communities as both disrespectful to the salmon, and also their way of life. This, among many other things, contributed to tensions between Indigenous, and non-Indigenous communities of the Northwest.

== History in northwestern North America ==
=== Columbia River, Oregon ===
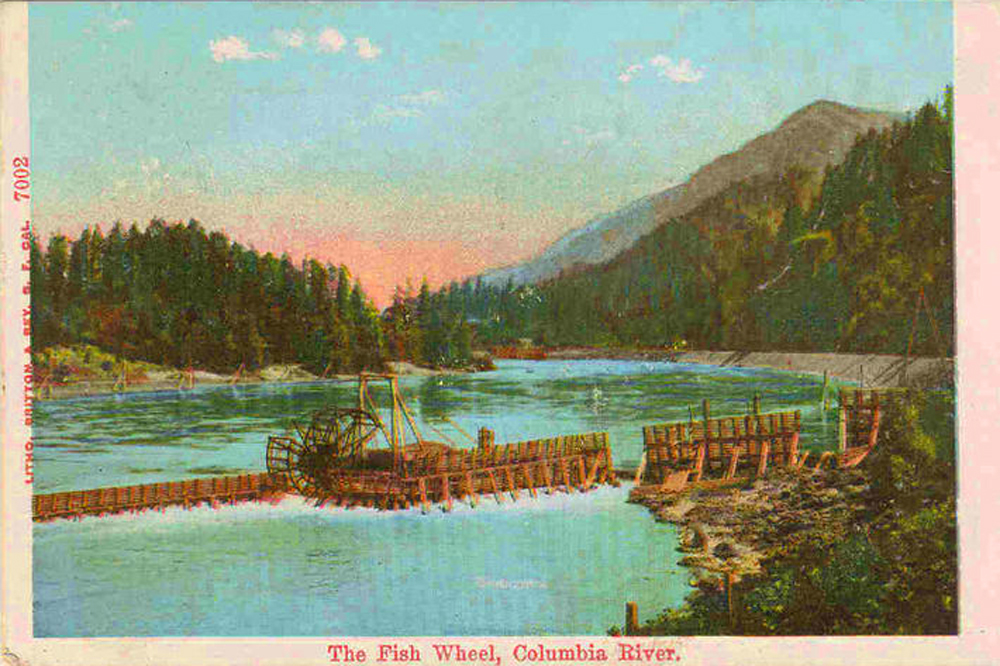
A hand-tinted postcard of a fish wheel on the lower Columbia River around 1910.

The abundance of salmon in the Columbia River of Oregon state made the area popular to Euro-American traders and business-people in the nineteenth century, those whom quickly anchored a profitable business of trade with Indigenous communities, riverboats, and steamships traveling along the Pacific coast. However, the landscape of trade changed drastically with the boom of the Industrial Revolution and the arrival of the Northern Pacific Railroad to Oregon in 1883. The revolution also brought with it new technologies in food preservation—canning, in particular—and consequently, new types of entrepreneurs who saw opportunity in the Columbia River as grounds to establish salmon canneries. These companies placed their factories strategically at the beginning of the salmon's upstream migration, when the fish were not yet weakened and wounded from their journey. This, however, meant for captured salmon that had yet to spawn, which would prove greatly injurious to the population. By the end of the 1880s, thirty canning companies had been erected, and brought with them new harvesting techniques, including shore seining, gillnets, and fish wheels. The wheels, in particular, were tremendously effective in the churning waters of the Columbia. One fish wheel, for example, recorded a catch of 227,000 pounds of salmon in one day in 1894. By 1900, seventy-six fish wheels had been erected between the Cascades, Celilo Falls, and the Dalles Rapids. 1911 marked the highest year of harvest at forty-seven million pounds of fish, but also drew attention to a rapidly declining salmon population. The efficacy of fish wheels made them unpopular with other fishers on the Columbia, including Indigenous communities dispossessed of their traditional hunting grounds, downriver gillnetters, and even sport fishers who found the wheels ignoble. Contrariwise, the fish wheel operators pointed blame at the gillnetting fleets for being responsible for destroying the salmon population. The argument grew heated and drew the attention of conservationists and government officials who soon joined the conversation, and eventually legislation to limit salmon harvest was enacted, including restrictions on gillnets, and the prohibition of fish wheels, which were officially outlawed in Oregon by 1926 and in Washington in 1934.

The legal battle entitled United States v. Winans exemplifies the climate of Indigenous relationships with the state at the time, in regards to land and water dispossession by the encroaching establishment of such fishing industries. The United States had recently entered into several treaties with certain First Nations tribes of the Pacific Northwest wherein land occupied by the First Nations was taken by the state in exchange for monetary compensation and small land reserves ("reservations") where said tribal communities were guaranteed the security of practicing their cultural traditions—including hunting and fishing. With these treaties newly in place, fishing and canning companies were free to erect their industries on what was once Indigenous land. Brothers Lineas and Audubon Winans, for example, established a state-licensed fish wheel operation near Celilo Falls in the 1890s, which devastated the local salmon run that was otherwise of critical importance to tribes situated downstream, such as the Umatilla, Yakama and Nez Perce peoples. Likewise, under the protection of these newly-established treaties, the Winans brothers' operation also legally and forcibly prohibited passage to these Indigenous peoples to their traditional fishing grounds. The battle was fought by First Nations peoples against the state to reinstate rights to their lands whereupon the Washington State Court ruled for the Winans on the basis of their exclusive rights to private property. In response, the Indigenous community brought suit to enjoin the brothers' operation to cease using their fish wheel.

=== Alaska and Yukon ===
In 1949, a man running a fish wheel some twenty miles south of Fort Yukon sparked a small gold rush when he discovered pea-sized nuggets of gold caught in the baskets of the wheel, and a local radio station caught the news. Bush aircraft brought many prospectors who set up a camp along eight miles of the Yukon River, which included a small coffee shop and a clothing store, and set about panning the river bed. Unfortunately, no gold was found, and all but two of the initial nuggets were discovered to be brass. Those two that were gold were suspected to have belonged to the remains of an old prospector's cache, and were reported to have been only worth two dollars.

== Current uses ==
=== Alaska and Yukon ===
In Alaska and the Yukon Territory, the harvest of salmon is important for self-subsisting communities and individuals for both people and dog sled teams. The Alaska Department of Fish and Game will allocate permits for the use of fish wheels in such personal circumstances, but under strict rules and regulations, and only in specific areas of the Chitina and Copper rivers. Given these rivers traverse between the countries of Canada and The United States, state-sanctioned rules and regulations between Alaska and the Yukon are similar. Additionally, given the precarious situation of the local salmon population and its importance to Indigenous communities, community-driven initiatives like the Yukon River Panel offer critical suggestions to government policy-makers in both countries that consider the cultural relevance of salmon, and the importance in conserving their species. For example, one of many initiatives driven forward by this panel is a program for First Nations youth that involves, among many other traditional interactions with salmon, instruction in operating a fish wheel.

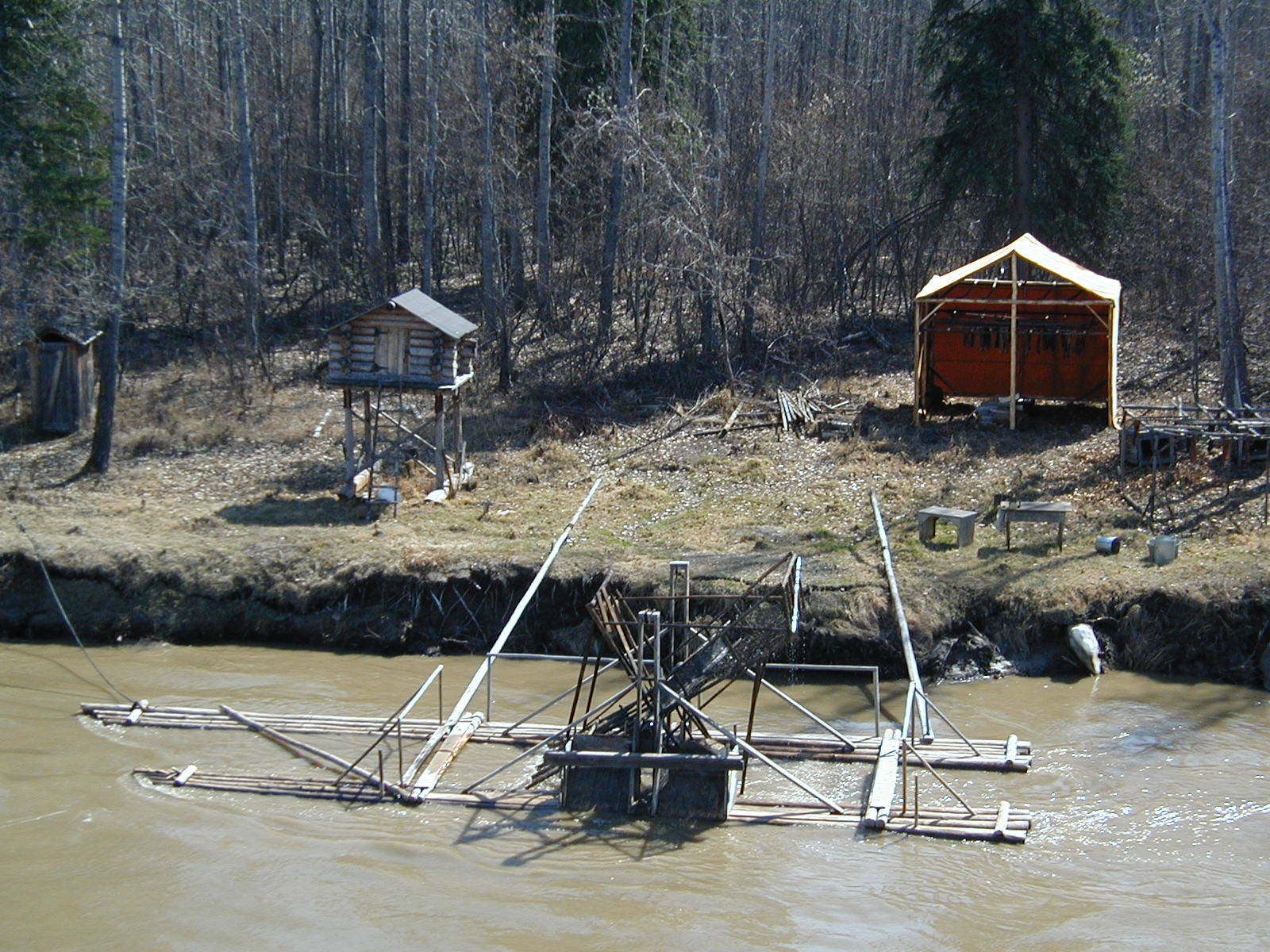
A fishing camp in Alaska, complete with drying shed and bear-proof cache on stilts

=== Wildlife conservation ===
The Alaska Department of Fish and Game currently employs nine fish wheels situated along the Yukon River to help quantify the population of migrating salmon species, as does the Nisga'a Fisheries Board, with wheels in the Nass River of British Columbia. The Washington Department of Fish and Wildlife also uses fish wheels for salmon stock assessment, and does not permit the use of them for commercial gain. However, multiple studies have found that this method of live-capture, where the fish were kept for periods of time in holding tanks, then physically handled in marking procedures, initiated stress in released specimens, and ultimately impeded their ability to swim upstream. In an effort to mitigate the stress induced in these procedures, from 2001 to 2003, researchers tested the implementation of an event-triggered video-recording system on fish wheels in Alaska's Yukon River drainage. In these systems, captured fish would trigger a camera shutter which would document every fish that passed through the wheel thereby removing the need for human handling. In these experiments, this method also demonstrated an improvement in fish-counting accuracy, however the cost of the video-recording equipment makes implementation on a large scale restrictive.

== See also ==
- Traditional ecological knowledge
- Athabaskan languages
- Smoked salmon
- Status of First Nations treaties in British Columbia
- Artisanal fishing
- Land grabbing
