= History of Washington (state) =

Washington's state flag since 1967

The history of Washington includes thousands of years of Native American history before Europeans arrived and began to establish territorial claims. The region was part of Oregon Territory from 1848 to 1853, after which it was separated from Oregon and established as Washington Territory following the efforts at the Monticello Convention. On November 11, 1889, Washington became the 42nd state of the United States.

== Prehistory and cultures ==
Archaeological evidence shows that the Pacific Northwest was one of the first populated areas in North America. Both animal and human bones dating back to 13,000 years old have been found across Washington and evidence of human habitation in the Olympic Peninsula dates back to approximately 9,000 BCE, 3,000 to 5,000 years after massive flooding of the Columbia River which carved the Columbia Gorge.

Anthropologists estimate there were 125 distinct Northwest tribes and 50 languages and dialects in existence before the arrival of Euro-Americans in this region. Throughout the Puget Sound region, coastal tribes made use of the region's abundant natural resources, subsisting primarily on salmon, halibut, shellfish, and whale. Cedar was an important building material and was used by tribes to build both longhouses and large canoes. Clothing was also made from the bark of cedar trees. The Columbia River tribes became the richest of the Washington tribes through their control of Celilo Falls, historically the richest salmon fishing location in the Northwest. These falls on the Columbia River, east of present-day The Dalles, Oregon, were part of the path millions of salmon took to spawn. The presence of private wealth among the more aggressive coastal tribes encouraged gender divisions, as women took on prominent roles as traders and men participated in warring and captive-taking with other tribes. The eastern tribes, called the Plateau tribes, survived through seasonal hunting, fishing, and gathering. Tribal work among the Plateau Indians was also gender-divided, with both men and women responsible for equal parts of the food supply.

The principal tribes of the coastal areas include the Chinook, Lummi, Quinault, Makah, Quileute, and Snohomish. The Plateau tribes include the Klickitat, Cayuse, Nez Percé, Okanogan, Palouse, Spokane, Wenatchee, and Yakama. Today, Washington contains more than 20 Indian reservations, the largest of which is for the Yakama.

At Ozette, in the northwest corner of the state, an ancient village was covered by a mud slide, perhaps triggered by an earthquake about 500 years ago. More than 50,000 well-preserved artifacts have been found and cataloged, many of which are now on display at the Makah Cultural and Research Center in Neah Bay. Other sites have also revealed how long people have been there. Thumbnail-sized quartz knife blades found at the Hoko River site near Clallam Bay are believed to be 2,500 years old.

== European Colony ==
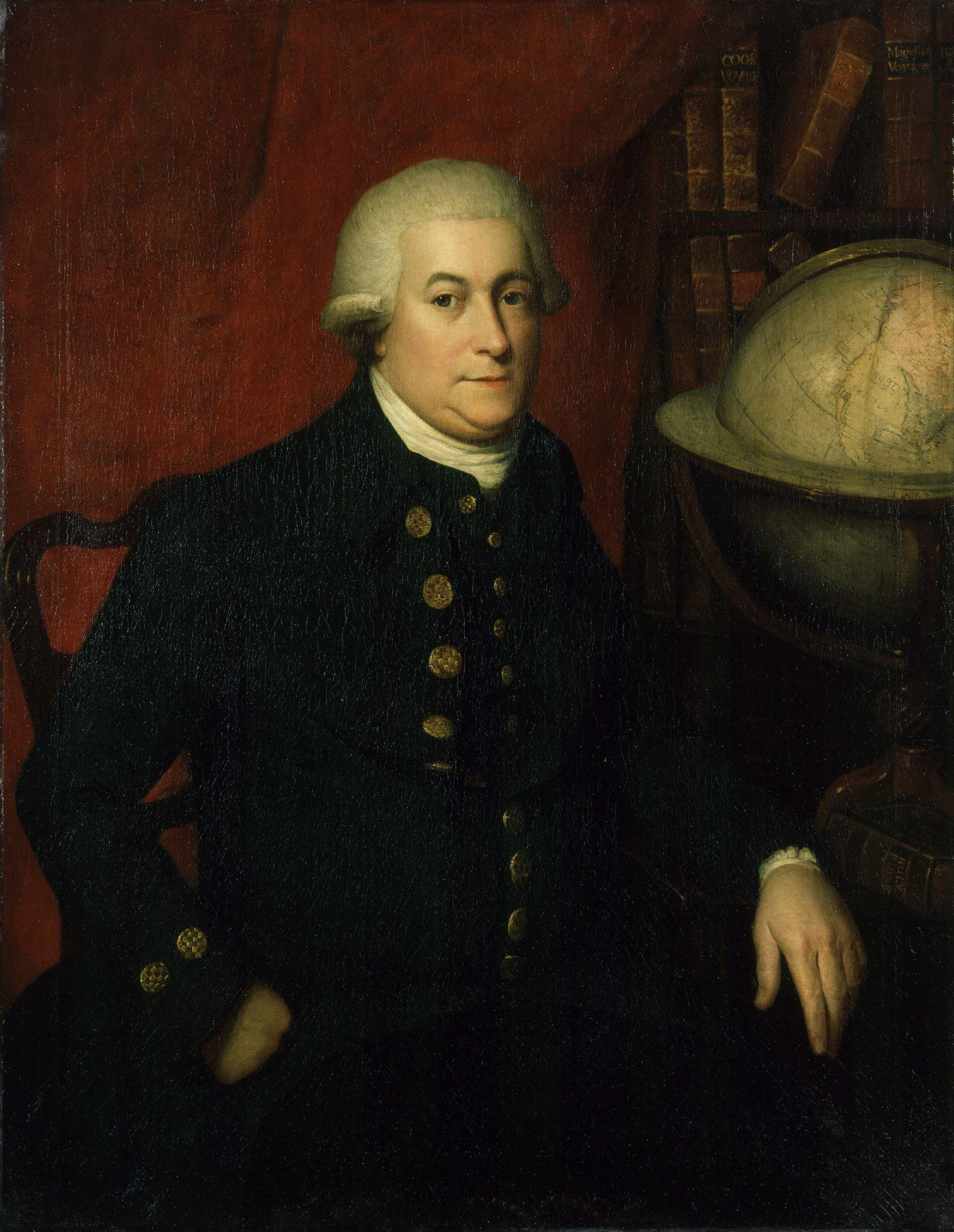
A portrait from the late 18th century by an unknown artist, believed to depict Captain George Vancouver (1757–1798), a British naval explorer in 1792, who claimed the territory of modern-day Washington state in the Pacific Northwest region along the West Coast of North America for the United Kingdom / British Empire and named the inlet / bay of Puget Sound.

=== Early European and American exploration ===
The first European sighting of the future Washington state coast on record was in 1774 by Spaniard mariner Juan José Pérez Hernández (c.1725–1775), sailing for the Kingdom of Spain / Spanish Empire, but he did not land. One year later, another Spanish-Basque Captain Don Bruna de Heceta (1747–1807), on board the Santiago, part of a two-ship flotilla with the accompanying Sonora, landed at Point Grenville near the mouth of the Quinault River, becoming the first Europeans to set foot in what is now Washington. The party claimed the coastal lands for Spain as far north up to the already present colonists of the Russian Empire possessions, originally discovered / claimed by Captain Vitus Bering (1681–1741), a Russian (Danish-born) mariner sailing the coasts of the northern Pacific for Russia and its rapidly expanding Russian Empire across the Bering Strait and Bering Sea (named for him) coming from eastern Siberia and Asia) further up the Pacific coast in Russian America since the 1740s (modern Alaska, purchased by the United States in 1867).

In 1778, the British Royal Navy explorer Captain James Cook (1728–1779), sighted Cape Flattery, at the entrance of the Puget Sound at the Strait of Juan de Fuca. But the strait itself was not found until almost a decade later when Charles William Barkley (c.1759–1832), captain of the Imperial Eagle, sighted it in 1787. Captain Barkley named it for the earlier Spanish-Greek explorer Juan de Fuca (1536–1602). The Spanish-British treaties of the Nootka Conventions of the 1790s ended Spanish exclusivity and opened the Northwest North America Coast to explorers and traders from other nations, most important being the future British, Russians, and Americans of the United States. Further explorations of the straits were performed again by Spanish-Peruvian explorer Manuel Quimper (1757–1844), in 1790 and a year later by Francisco de Eliza (1759–1825), in 1791 and then the following year of 1792, came the arrival by British Royal Navy Captain George Vancouver (1757–1798). Captain Vancouver claimed the sound and coast for Britain and named the waters originally to the far south of the Tacoma Narrows as the Puget's Sound, in honor of Peter Puget (1765–1822), (who was the young Royal Navy naval lieutenant accompanying him on the Vancouver Expedition of 1791–1795, (later in his naval career he became a rear admiral). The name later came to be used also for the waters north of the Tacoma Narrows as well. Captain Vancouver and his expedition mapped the Pacific coast of western North America in 1792 to 1794, including the then large tract of the Oregon Country composed later of future territories / then states of Oregon and Washington / Idaho, plus to the north of the Canadian colonies of British North America of the Colony of Vancouver Island on off-shore Vancouver Island and the mainland's Columbia District / then later renamed Department, on the continent. Then subsequently after several decades in 1858 / 1866 into the Colony of British Columbia, eventually merging the island and mainland becoming by 1866, the modern British Columbia, later joining the 1867 confederation formed further east of the Dominion of Canada four years later in 1871 as the western-most province) in the Pacific Northwest region.

Map of the Lewis and Clark Expedition of 1804–1806, northwest through the newly acquired Louisiana Purchase of 1803.

Captain Robert Gray (1755–1806) (for whom Grays Harbor County in Washington was named), a civilian sea captain of a merchantman cargo vessel, discovered the mouth of the Columbia River along the West Coast of the North America continent in the Pacific Northwest region in 1792, naming the river after his ship "Columbia" and later establishing a trade in sea otter, seal and walrus fur pelts in the surrounding Pacific Northwest region. The Lewis and Clark Expedition (1804–1806), with their Corps of Discovery sent by the direction of third President Thomas Jefferson (1743–1826, served 1801–1809), entered the region from the east on October 10, 1805, having journeyed upstream on the Missouri River and through the passes in the Rocky Mountains chain, then downstream through the Snake River and Columbia River valleys to the coast. Explorers and scientific observers Meriwether Lewis (1774–1809), and William Clark (1770–1838), were surprised by the differences in the various Native Americans / Indian tribes in the Pacific Northwest from those they had encountered earlier in the expedition trip on the Great Plains, noting, in particular, the increased status of women among both coastal and upper plateau / mountain tribes. Lewis hypothesized that the equality of women and the elderly with men, was linked to more evenly distributed economic roles.

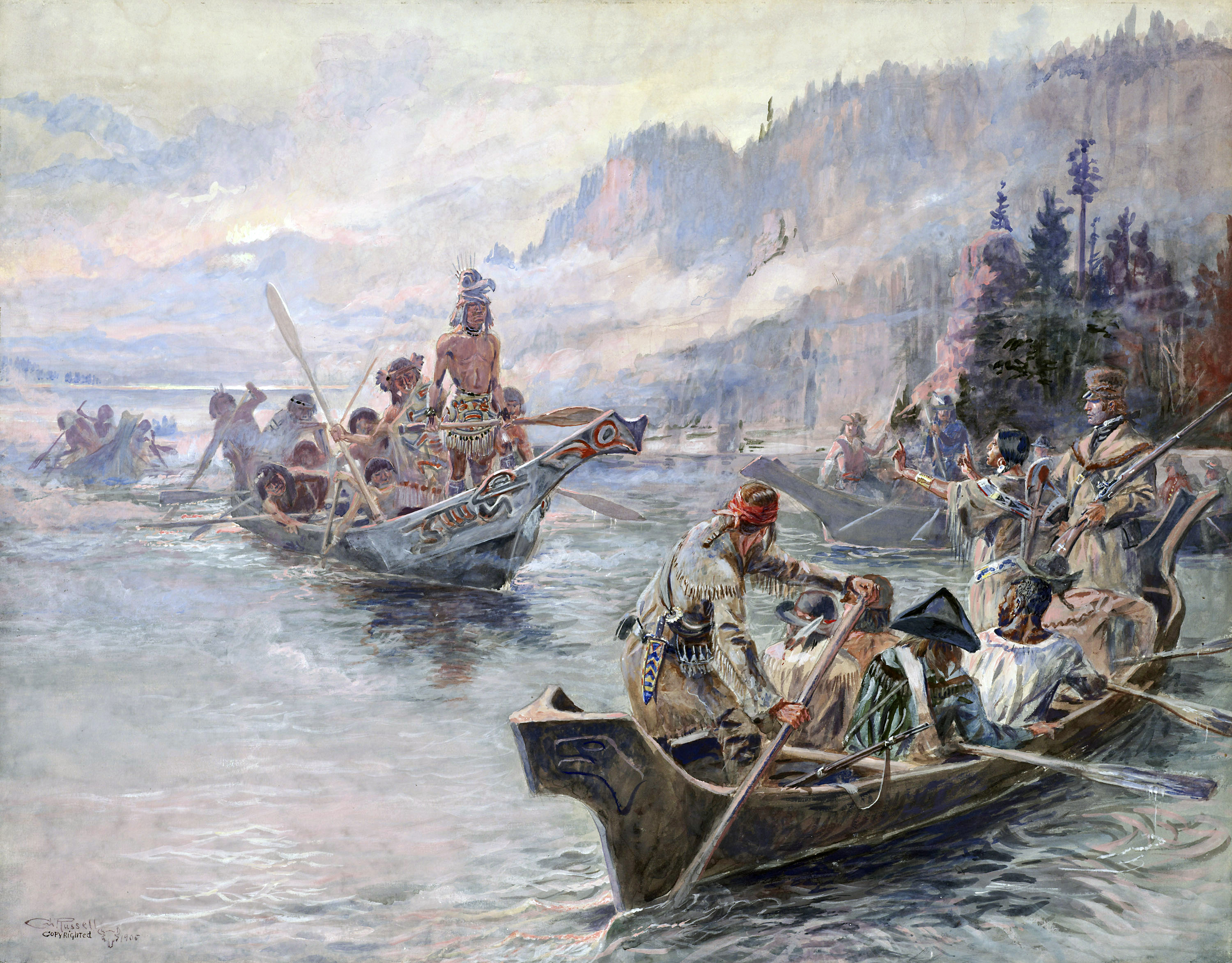
Lewis and Clark's expedition Corps of Discovery meet the Chinooks on the Lower Columbia River in October 1805, (Lewis and Clark on the Lower Columbia, artwork painted by Charles Marion Russel (1864–1926), a century later after the event c. 1905)

British / Canadian explorer, surveyor / cartographer and fur trader David Thompson (1770–1857), extensively explored the Columbia River two years later, commencing in 1807. Four years later in 1811, he became the first European to navigate the entire length of the river westward downstream to its mouth on the Pacific Ocean. Along the way he posted a notice where it joins the Snake River claiming the land for Great Britain (United Kingdom / British Empire), and stating the intention of their North West Company to build a fort and trading post there. Subsequently, the Fort Nez Perces trading post, was established (near present-day Walla Walla, Washington). Thompson's posted notice was later found by the party of Astorians of John Jacob Astor (1763–1848) looking to establish an inland fur trading post / station. It contributed to American mercantile fur trader leader David Stuart (1765–1853)'s choice, on behalf of the competing Americans' and Astor's short-lived Pacific Fur Company (1810–1813), of choosing a more northerly site for their operations which were then established at Fort Okanogan (in modern Okanogan County, near Brewster, Washington).

By the time American settlers started arriving from the east in the 1830s, a population of Métis (mixed race) people had grown from centuries of contact with early-European fur traders partnering with Native American women. Before larger numbers of Caucasian European American women began moving to the territory from the east and the United States in the 1830s, traders and fur trade workers generally sought out Métis or Native American women for wives and companionship or for domestic chores. Early European-Indigenous mixed ancestry settlements resulted from these partnerships as an outgrowth of the fur trade then growing into the work of agriculture raising small crops of grain and vegetables harvested for food at: Cowlitz Prairie (Fort Vancouver) and Frenchtown, Washington (Fort Nez Percés).

=== American–British joint occupation disputes ===
American interests in the region grew as part of their concept of manifest destiny. Spain had ceded their rights north of the 42nd Parallel to the United States by the terms of the earlier 1819 Adams-Onís Treaty, (but not possession, which was disallowed by the terms of the Nootka Conventions).

Britain had long-standing commercial interests through the Hudson's Bay Company and a well-established network of fur trading stations and forts along the Columbia River in what it called the Columbia District. These were headquartered from Fort Vancouver in present-day Vancouver, Washington.

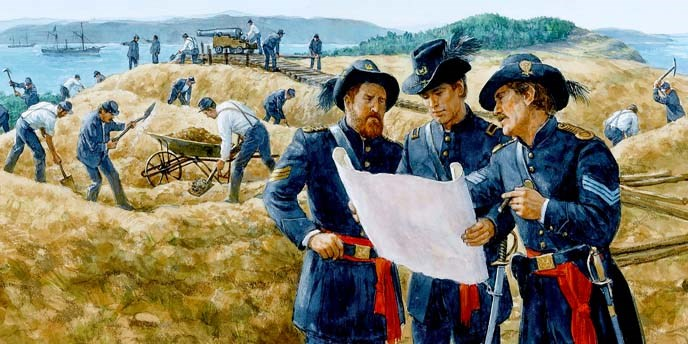
Watercolor of the United States Army building Robert's Redoubt under command of then 2nd Lt. Henry Martyn Robert (1837–1923), and then Captain George Pickett (1825–1875), on the off-shore San Juan Island in the San Juan Islands chain in the old federal Washington Territory (1853–1889), during the border dispute and skirmish of the so-called Pig War of 1859.

By the Treaty of 1818, following from the War of 1812 (1812–1815), Great Britain and the United States established the 49th parallel as the international border stretching west to the Continental Divide of the Rocky Mountains; but agreed to temporary joint control and occupancy of the Oregon Country / Columbia District for the next few years.

In 1824, the Russian Empire (Russia) signed an agreement with the U.S. acknowledging it had no claims south of the parallel line 54-40 of latitude north and Russia signed a similar treaty with Britain the following in 1825, thereby establishing the southern limits of its coastal possessions in Russian America (modern Alaska) in the northwestern corner of the North American continent until its sale to the U.S. 43 years later in 1867.

British-American joint occupancy was renewed, but on a year-to-year basis in 1827. Eventually, increased tension between U.S. settlers arriving by way of the Oregon trail and already resident fur traders led to the intensified Oregon boundary dispute, a major political issue in the American 1844 presidential election. It resulting in the election victory of 11th President James K. Polk (1795–1849, served 1845–1849), of Tennessee with his expansionist foreign policies. Two years later, on June 15, 1846, Britain ceded its claims to the lands south of the 49th parallel, and the U.S. ceded its claims to the north of the same line, resulting in the present-day Canada–U.S. international border, resulting in the amicable splitting of the Oregon/Columbia territory along the 49th parallel line, extending it westward from the Great Lakes through the Rocky Mountains chain all the way to the west coast at the Pacific Ocean (with the exception of the off-shore Vancouver Island, assigned to Britain) between the two nations, in the negotiated Oregon Treaty of 1846.

A quarter-century later in 1872, an additional arbitration process settled the minor boundary dispute from the so-called Pig War of 1859 and established the U.S.A.–Canada border line through the off-shore San Juan Islands and Gulf Islands on the Pacific coast.

== Part of Oregon Territory (1846–1853) ==
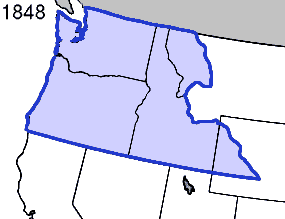
The federal Oregon Territory (August 1848 to February 1859), carved out of the American southern portion of the former Oregon Country (1818–1846) with the Oregon Treaty of June 15, 1846, signed in the federal national capital city of Washington, D.C., between the United States and Great Britain (old United Kingdom / British North America of the British Empire) as originally laid out and organized, in 1848 until 1853, with separation of old Washington Territory to the north and east, up to statehood of Oregon in 1859.

In 1848, the Oregon Territory, composed of present-day Washington, Oregon, and Idaho as well as parts of Montana and Wyoming, was established. Settlements in the eastern part of the state were largely agricultural and focused around missionary establishments in the Walla Walla Valley. Missionaries attempted to 'civilize' the Indians, often in ways that disregarded or misunderstood native practices. When missionaries Dr. Marcus Whitman and Narcissa Whitman refused to leave their mission as racial tensions mounted in 1847, 13 American missionaries were killed by Cayuse and Umatilla Indians. Explanations of the 1847 Whitman massacre in Walla Walla include outbreaks of disease, resentment over harsh attempts at conversion of both religion and way of life, and contempt of the native Indians shown by the missionaries, particularly by Narcissa Whitman, the first white American woman in the Oregon Territory.

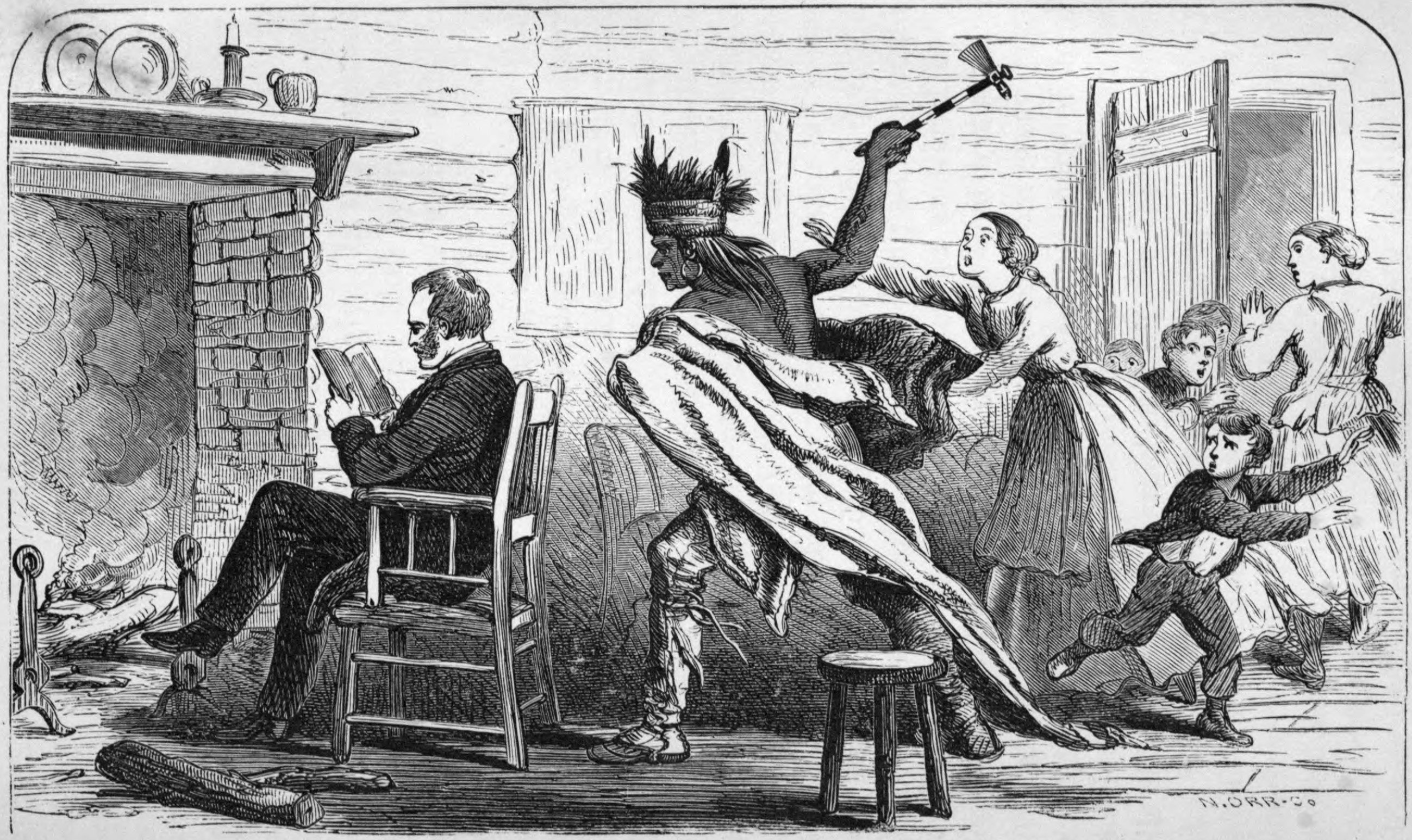
The Whitman Massacre

This event triggered the Cayuse War against the Natives, wherein the Provisional Legislature of Oregon in 1847 immediately raised companies of volunteers to go to war, if necessary, against the Cayuse, and, to the discontent of some of the militia leaders, also sent a peace commission. The United States Army later came to support the militia forces. These militia forces, eager for action, provoked both friendly and hostile Indians. In 1850, five Cayuse were convicted for murdering the Whitmans in 1847 and hanged. Sporadic bloodshed continued until 1855, when the Cayuse were decimated, defeated, bereft of their tribal lands, and placed on the Umatilla Indian Reservation in northeastern Oregon.

As American settlers moved west along the Oregon Trail, some traveled through the northern part of the Oregon Territory and settled in the Puget Sound area. The first European settlement in the Puget Sound area in the west of present-day Washington State came in 1833 at the British Hudson's Bay Company's Fort Nisqually, a farm and fur-trading post later operated by the Puget's Sound Agricultural Company (incorporated in 1840), a subsidiary of the Hudson's Bay Company. Washington's pioneer founder, Michael Simmons, along with the black pioneer George Washington Bush and his Caucasian wife, Isabella James Bush, from Missouri and Tennessee, respectively, led four white families into the territory and settled New Market, now known as Tumwater, in 1846. They settled in Washington to avoid Oregon's racist settlement-laws. After them, many more settlers, migrating overland along the Oregon trail, wandered north to settle in the Puget Sound area.

== Washington Territory (1853–1889) ==
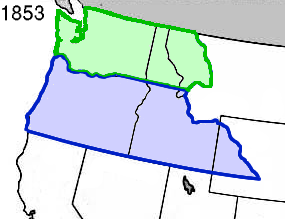
The Oregon Territory (blue) with the Washington Territory (green) in 1853

Washington Territory, which included Washington and pieces of Idaho and Montana, was formed from Oregon Territory in 1853. Isaac Ingalls Stevens, a Mexican-American War veteran, had heavily supported the candidacy of President Franklin Pierce, a fellow veteran. In 1853 Stevens successfully applied to President Pierce for the governorship of the new Washington Territory, a post that also carried the title of Superintendent of Indian Affairs.

Lumber industries drew settlers to the territory. Coastal cities, like Seattle (founded in 1851 and originally called "Duwamps"), were established. Though wagon trains had previously carried entire families to the Oregon Territory, these early trading settlements were populated primarily with single young men. Liquor, gambling, and prostitution were ubiquitous, supported in Seattle by one of the city's founders, David Swinson "Doc" Maynard, who believed that well-run prostitution could be a functional part of the economy. The Fraser Gold Rush in what would, as a result, become the Colony of British Columbia saw a flurry of settlement and merchant activity in northern Puget Sound which gave birth to Port Townsend (in 1851) and Whatcom (founded in 1858, later becoming Bellingham) as commercial centres, at first attempting to rival Victoria on Vancouver Island as a disembarkation point of the goldfields until the governor of the Colony of Vancouver Island ordered that all traffic to the Fraser River go via Victoria. Despite the limitation on goldfield-related commerce, many men who left the "Fraser River Humbug" (as the rush was for a while misnamed) settled in Whatcom and Island counties. Some of these were settlers on San Juan Island during the Pig War of 1859.

Upon the admission of the State of Oregon to the union in 1859, the eastern portions of the Oregon Territory, including southern Idaho, portions of Wyoming west of the continental divide (then Nebraska Territory), and a small portion of present-day Ravalli County, Montana were annexed to the Washington Territory. In 1863, the area of Washington Territory east of the Snake River and the 117th meridian west was reorganized as part of the newly formed Idaho Territory, leaving that territory with only the lands within the current boundaries of the State of Washington.

=== The "Indian Wars" (1855–1858) ===
The conflicts over the possession of land between the Indians and the American settlers led the Americans in 1855, by the treaties at the Walla Walla Council, to coerce not only the Cayuse, but also the Walla Walla and the Umatilla tribes, to the Umatilla Indian Reservation in northeastern Oregon; fourteen other tribal groups to the Yakama Indian Reservation in southern Washington State; and the Nez Perce to a reservation in the border region of Washington, Oregon and Idaho.

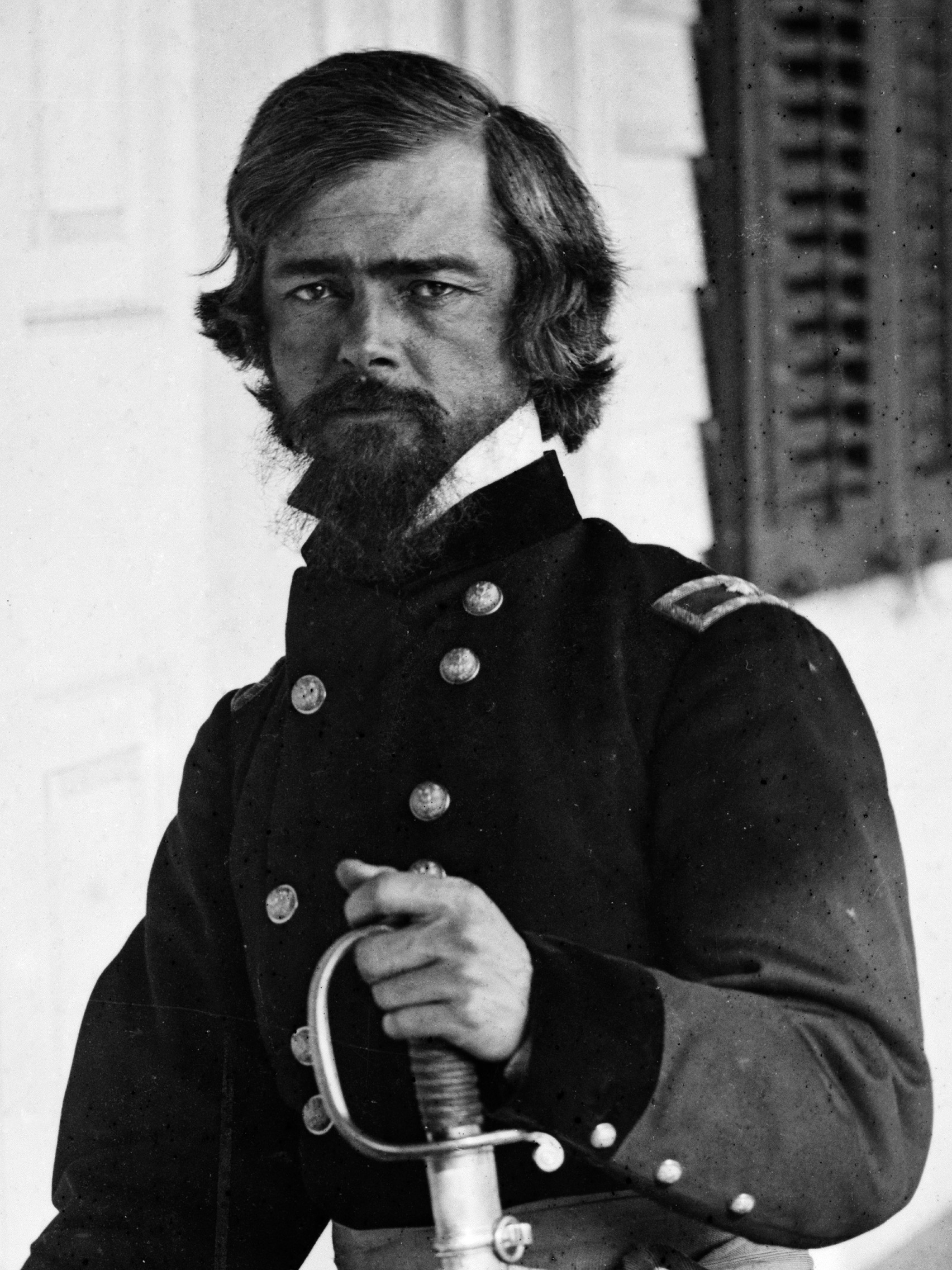
Washington governor Isaac Stevens, pictured here in 1862, was joined by Oregon governor George Curry in calling for the dismissal of Gen. Wool.

That same year, gold was discovered in the newly established Yakama reservation and white miners encroached upon these lands, with Washington Territory beginning to consider annexing them. While Governor Stevens generally avoided some of the more genocidal rhetoric that was popular among some settlers, historian David M. Buerge charges that Stevens' "timetable [was] reckless; [that] the whole enterprise was organized in profound ignorance of native society, culture, and history," and that "[t]he twenty-thousand-odd aboriginal inhabitants who were assumed to be in rapid decline, were given a brutal choice: they would adapt to white society or they could disappear.”

A treaty was presented to Chief Leschi of the Nisqually (along with other tribes), and while it provided concessions such as fishing rights, the main crux of the so-called Treaty of Medicine Creek was that it required: "The said tribes and bands of Indians hereby cede, relinquish and convey to the United States, all their right, title, and interest in and to the lands and country occupied by them."

Leschi was outraged and pulled out of the negotiations, preferring war to the loss of his tribe's ancestral lands. While it is not clear who fired the first shots, this standoff quickly escalated into violence as Washington Territorial militias began to exchange fire with Nisqually soldiers. This conflict would come to be known as the Puget Sound War.

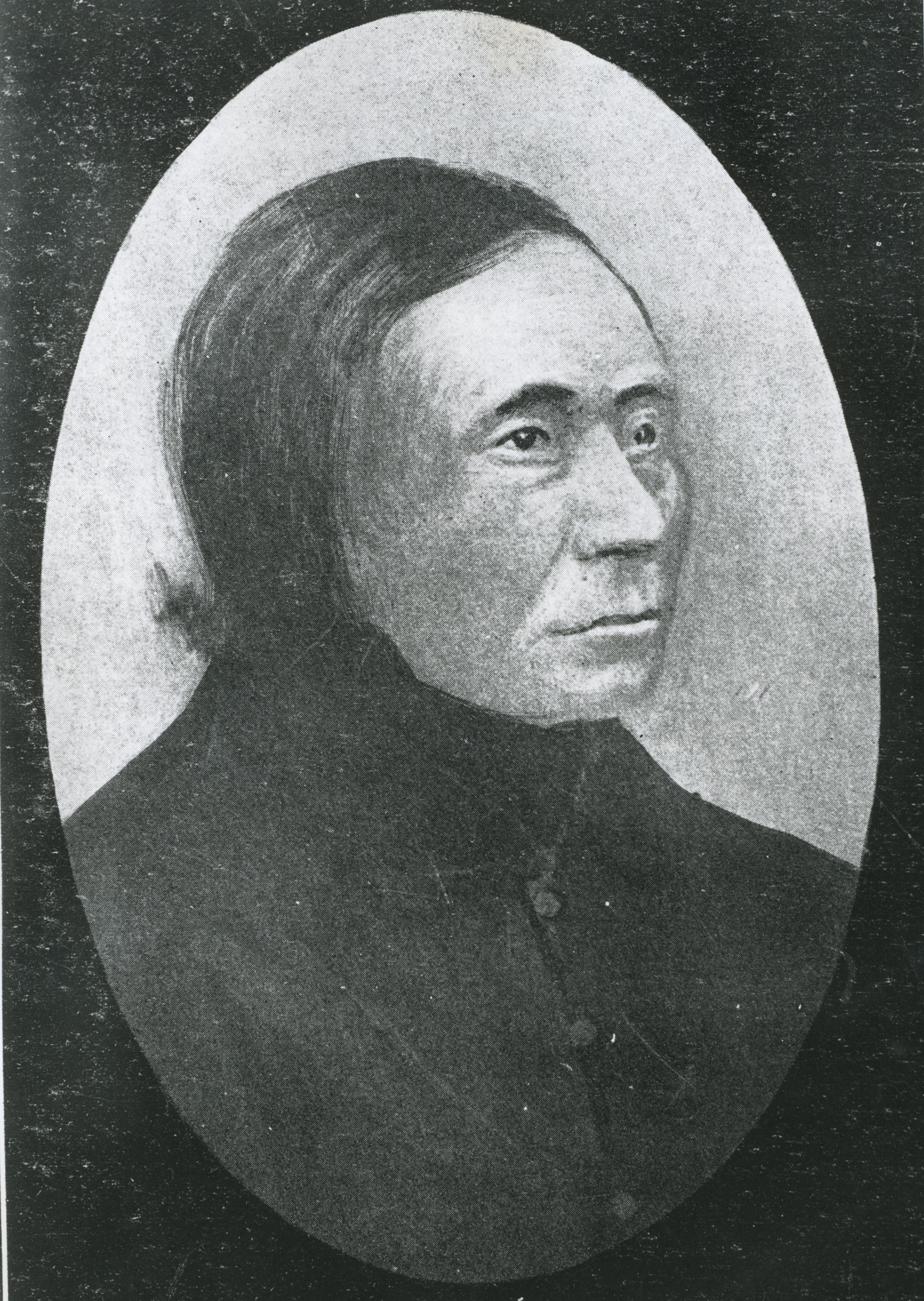
Chief Leschi as he appeared in the 1850s

In 1856, Chief Leschi of the Nisqually was finally captured after one of the largest battles of the war. Stevens, who was seeking to punish Leschi for what he considered a troublesome revolt, had Leschi charged with the murder of a member of the Washingtonian militia. Leschi's argument in his defense was that he was not at the scene of the killing, but that even if he was the killing had been an act of war and was thus not murder. The initial trial ended in a hung jury after the judge told jurors that if they believed the killing of the militiaman was an act of war, they could not find Leschi guilty of murder. A second trial, without this note to the jury, ended in Leschi being convicted of murder and sentenced to execution. Interference by those who opposed the execution were able to stall it for months, but in the end they could not prevent it. Chief Leschi was formally exonerated of his crimes in 2014.

Concurrent with the Nisqually negotiations, tensions with other local tribes also continued to escalate. In one instance a group of Washingtonians assaulted and murdered a Yakama mother, her daughter, and her newborn infant. The woman's husband Mosheel, the son of the Yakama tribe's chieftain, gathered up a posse, tracked down the miners and killed them. The Bureau of Indian Affairs sent out an agent named Andrew Bolon to investigate, but before reaching the crime scene the chief of the Yakama intercepted him and warned Bolon that Mosheel was too dangerous to be taken in. Taking heed of this warning, Bolon decided to return to the Bureau to report his findings. He joined a traveling group of Yakama on his return trip, and while they walked he told them why he was in the area, about the unexplained murder that had happened. Unbeknownst to Bolon, the rest of the trip would be taken up by argument between the natives in a language he did not understand, as the leader of the group, Mosheel, argued for the murder of Bolon. Before he was stabbed in the throat, Bolon reportedly yelled in Chinook dialect, "I did not come to fight you!"

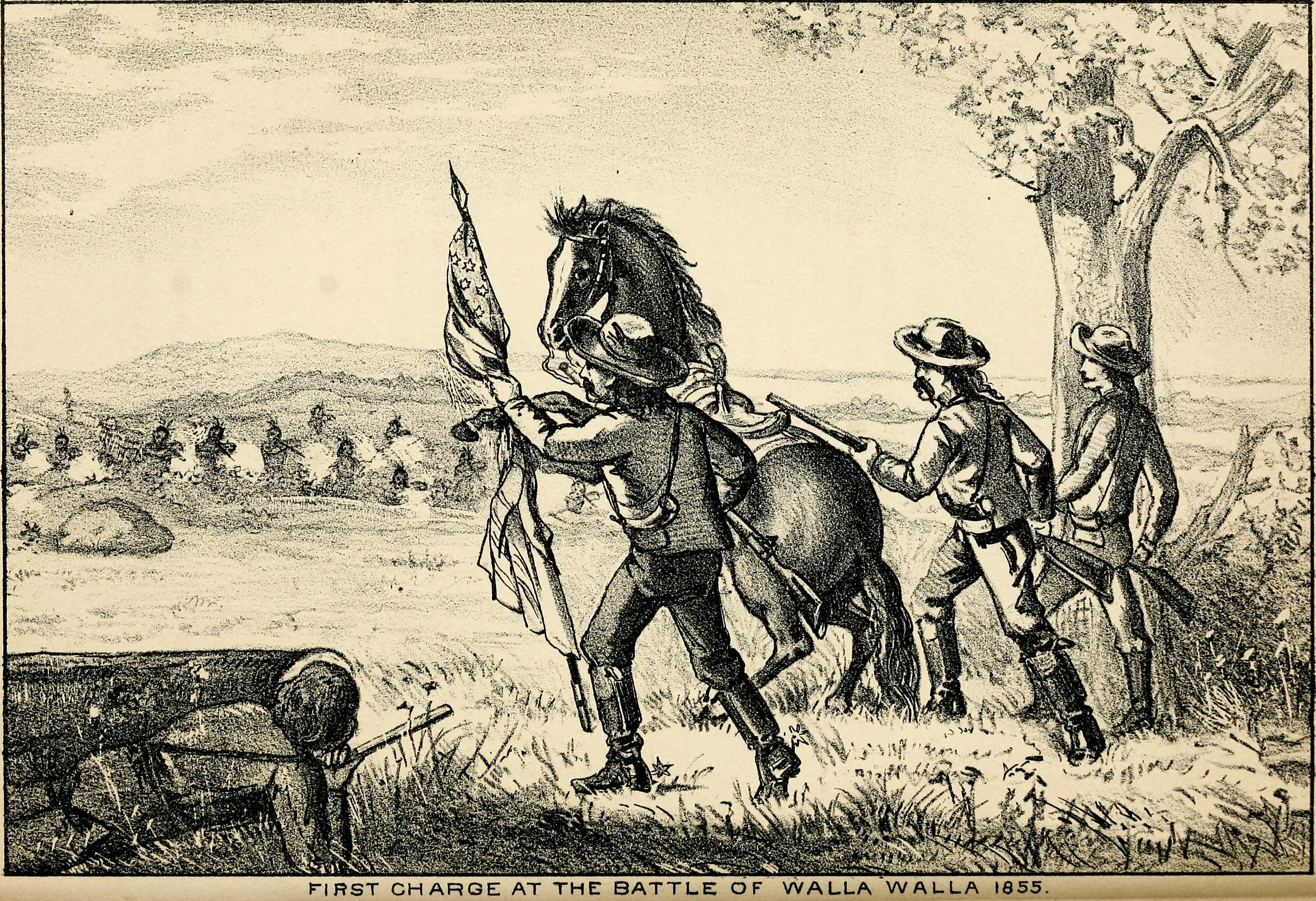
Depiction of the First Charge at the Battle of Walla Walla 1855.

Washington Territory immediately mobilized for war, and sent the Territorial Militia to put down what it saw as a rebellion. The tribes – first the Yakama, eventually joined by the Walla Walla and the Cayuse – united together to fight the Americans in what is called the Yakima War. The U.S. Army sent troops and a number of raids and battles took place. In 1858, the Americans, at the Battle of Four Lakes, defeated the Natives decisively. In a newly imposed treaty, tribes were, again, confined to reservations.

The Puget Sound War of 1855–1856, the Yakima War of 1855–1858, and the Spokane War of 1858, all happened simultaneously and were generally referred to by the Washingtonian settlers as the "Indian Wars". Fighting raged in the Cascade Mountains and spilled out into larger battles such as the Battle of Seattle, with both sides committing atrocities. Stevens led his soldiers on the frontlines, doing battle with the Natives in vicious encounters across the State. While eventually Federal General John E Wool arrived and tried to take control of the US’ forces to centralize the chain of command, his reportedly elitist attitude and belief that the Washingtonian whites had caused the war meant he lost the loyalty of the volunteer driven militias who mostly stayed de facto under the command of Stevens. In addition, raids by Haida, Tlingit and other northern tribes from British and Russian territory terrorized Native Americans and settlers alike in Puget Sound in the 1850s (note the events associated with Port Gamble in 1856–1857). Miners bound for the Fraser Canyon Gold Rush in British Columbia in 1858 using the Okanagan Trail traveled under arms, and many instances of violence occurred along the route.

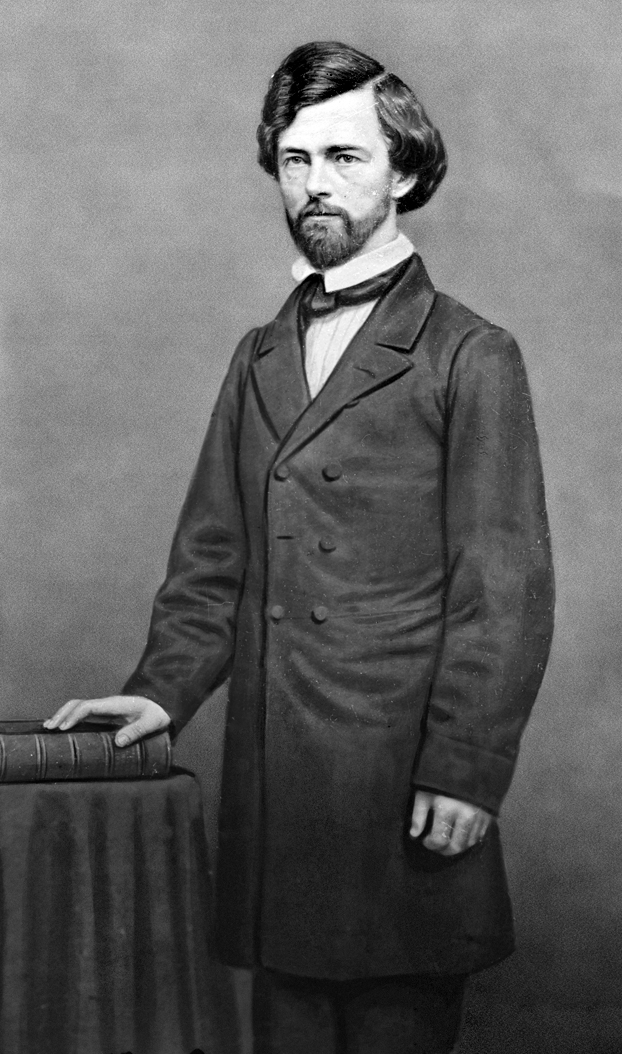
Governor Isaac Stevens (c. 1855–1862)

=== Stevens era political struggle ===
Throughout the existence of Washington Territory, Governor Isaac Ingalls Stevens proved the defining character of the political landscape. His hawkish and authoritarian tendencies were often at odds with the desires of the territorial and Federal governments. In addition, as both an anti-slavery and anti-federalist stronghold, Washington's position in the union was unclear as the nation approached its impending civil war.

Generally, citizens of Washington were highly anti-federalist, seeing the national government as greedy kleptocrats interfering in Washingtonian business. Despite this, the Federally mandated Stevens was often more popular with the Washingtonian people than the actual local elected government (despite the controversy surrounding him). As the nation approached civil war, national politics were in the midst of a great transition. The Whig party had recently collapsed and virtually disappeared from politics, and the newly formed Republicans were not yet a factor. This combined with their anti-federalist tendencies led to a strong Democratic Party majority in the territory (despite their lack of slavery and progressiveness in certain areas), but party label seemed to count for very little. The real political division in the legislative assembly was whether you were pro-Stevens or anti-Stevens.

The Indian Wars were controversial, as many who opposed Governor Stevens claimed they were unjust and that he had intentionally caused them, thereby costing many Washingtonians to lose their lives. This opposition would not grow any smaller when Stevens famously declared martial law:

Whereas in the prosecution of the Indian war circumstances have existed affording such grave cause of suspicion, such that certain evil disposed persons of Pierce county have given aid and comfort to the enemy. Therefore, as the war is now being actively prosecuted throughout nearly the whole of the said county, I, Isaac I. Stevens, Governor of the Territory of Washington, do hereby proclaim Martial law over the said county of Pierce, and do by these presents suspend for the time being and till further notice, the functions of all civil officers in said county.

The decision was made unilaterally, without the support of the territorial or federal government. In Washington, many men from the Hudson Bay Company had married Native women during the early years of the Territory (before it was considered safe enough for white women). Stevens and his administration suspected these men of having covertly aided the Natives, and so upon the declaration of Martial Law they were immediately arrested and shipped off to Fort Steilacoom. In addition, Stevens was generally suspicious of many of the Whig supporters throughout the territory, and had them arrested or harassed.

Siege of the Pierce County Courthouse
- Part of the Yakima War
- Date: May 24, 1856
- Location: Steilacoom, Washington, United States
- Caused by: Attempted arrest of Chief Justice Francis A. Chenoweth
- Result: Mutual withdrawal of federal, territorial, and county forces

Parties
Washington Territorial Volunteers	Pierce County Sheriff's Office	United States Army

Lead figures
Isaac Stevens Lt. Silas B. Curtis	Francis A. Chenoweth Sheriff of Pierce County	Lt. Col. Silas Casey

Number
30	50–60	Unknown

The territorial judiciary was outraged at this federal outsider overstepping his authority to trample on local rule of law, and Justices Francis Chenoweth and Edward Lander subsequently began a drawn out legal dispute with Stevens which threatened to spill the Territory into civil war. After Stevens ignored a writ of habeas corpus for the prisoners from Judge Lander, Lander responded by holding Stevens in contempt of court and sending out a posse of marshals to retrieve the Governor. These marshals were expelled, and in return Stevens had Judge Lander arrested by his militias. Stevens then established a military committee for the trials of those held under militia custody. At this point, Chief Territorial Justice Francis Chenoweth, who was in the midst of recovering from an illness, left his home in Whidbey Island and travelled by canoe to Pierce County. Upon arriving, Chenoweth again began the process of issuing a writ of habeas corpus.

News of Chenoweth's actions got to Stevens and he deployed a detachment of soldiers to shut down the court and arrest Chenoweth. While these volunteers were on route, Chenoweth ordered the Sheriff of Pierce County to summon the local posse under arms, and accordingly 50 men gathered to defend the court. Stevens’ territorial volunteers arrived at the courthouse demanding entrance to arrest Chenoweth, but the local militia held firm, and eventually soldiers from the local US Federal military base, led by Lt. Col. Silas Casey (who had previously written in sympathy of Chenoweth), arrived overlooking the town, with orders to intervene if shooting began. Fearing a shootout with both the Federal government and the territorial judiciary, Stevens’ men reluctantly pulled back after a drawn out negotiation between the three sides. Shortly afterwards, Judge Chenoweth ruled the declaration of Martial Law to be unconstitutional and said that the basis of insurrection justifying it had been greatly overblown by Stevens’ administration. The wrath of the Washington judiciary, legislature and public figures such as Ezra Meeker eventually forced Stevens to rescind the Martial Law order. While some pushed for his removal, President Pierce refused to take action against him (though he denounced the declaration of martial law), and many white settlers in Washington thought that the Anti-Stevens agitators were too sympathetic to the Natives.

==== The Washington People's Party ====
People's Party (Washington)
- Founded: Approx. 1865
- Split from: Majority Democratic Party; Minority Republican Party
- Ideology: Prior to 1880s: Populism; Bourbon Democrat; Anti-corruption; Half Breeds; Classical liberalism Conservatism; 1880s and after: Populism; Laborism; Anti-capitalism; Women's suffrage Progressivism; Nationalism; Anti-Asian

Because many Washingtonians did not feel they aligned with either the Republicans or Democrats, early on in the history of the territory a popular third party was founded, called the People's Party. The existence and prominence of this party is widely corroborated, with the official History of the Washington State Legislature claiming for example that former Republican Governor Dr. W.A. Newell ran as a People's Party candidate, and that in the 1887 Legislative council, 6 members were Republicans, 4 were Democrats, and 2 were from the People's Party. Most sources state that it was formed after a defection of Democrats and some anti-establishment Republicans from their parties. Despite this, the party's actual members, ideology, goals, achievements, and even the date of its foundation is somewhat difficult to place due to conflicting primary sources and a lack of secondary analysis.

The official History of the Washington State Legislature states "As had been the case in 1882, in Thurston County, Democrats and anti-administration Republicans joined to form the People’s Party". However a Washington local newspaper in 1865 listed the People's Party as one of the main competing parties in an election. As far back as 1854, newspapers mentioned ending talk of a "people's party", though it is not clear whether they were referring to an actually established party or a concept. It seems likely that the party had been established by at least 1874, as multiple primary sources attest to some kind of People's Party existing at the time.

The beliefs and allegiances of this party are also somewhat unclear. The official history and certain newspapers from the 1870s labelled the People's Party as nothing but radical Bourbon Democrats, who were effectively members of the Democrats. However other sources seemed to dispute this, with one newspaper claiming that the People's Party and the Republicans were working together against the Democrats. These early sources tend to paint the People's Party as having been ideologically Populist Conservatives, opposing the corruption and patronage that was common throughout the country at the time, the partisanship of the two political parties, and the culture of political bossism, preferring a more Washingtonian association free from strict partisan lines.

Despite many testimonies to the idea that the People's Party were simply a populist offshoot of the conservative Democrats, the Snohomish People's Party platform of 1886 paints a very different picture. In it the party is portrayed more as a populist quasi-socialist laborite party, which believed that capitalists controlled the national Congress, and that a party for the Washingtonian working class was needed to fight for its interests. This version of the party advocated busting monopolies, increasing safety regulations, equal pay for all regardless of race, sex, or creed, women's suffrage, the abolition of convict labor, the abolition of child labor, and the use of public land by settlers rather than corporations. Notably, this party platform also displayed intense nationalist, anti-foreigner, and anti-Asian sentiments, calling for the end of the importation of "hordes of heathen slaves" from the "Mongolian Empire" into America by business owners, the restriction of their right to own property, and the deportation of existing Chinese peoples. This version of the party also fits into the noted debate during the late 1880s over whether the People's Party was officially affiliated with the Knights of Labor, with whom many members were shared.

Another complicating factor is the founding of the broader national People's Party in 1892, seemingly unaffiliated with the early People's Party in Washington. The views of this party would align with the later 1880s descriptions of the party, making it possible either that the Washington People's Party described in the 1880s was a separate party than the earlier one, or that over time the party had shifted from a Conservative to a more Progressive position. This would be supported by the official History of the Washington State Legislature, as it noted that in 1893 the People's Party merged with the local progressive Farmer's Alliance, whose national body had become the national People's Party a year prior. The third governor of Washington state, John Rankin Rogers, was elected as a member of the People's Party in 1897.

=== Civil War and rise of the Republican Party ===
While Washington territory was one of the least involved regions of the Union during the US Civil War, it nonetheless had a major impact on the territory. Despite anti-federalist sympathies and Democratic party dominance, there was never a strong secessionist movement in Washington state. While many were sympathetic to the cause of the Confederacy, the lack of slavery in the territory combined with its weariness after the Indian Wars gave it no real incentive to join ranks with the Confederates.

Because of Washington's distance and complicated relationship with the war in general, it never sent a division into battle during the Civil War. This does not mean it was totally uninvolved though. The Washington Territory Volunteer Militia was formed by Justus Steinberger, who was able to recruit roughly two divisions from Washington civilians. The Volunteer soldiers who served in Washington did not fight against the Confederacy, but instead garrisoned the few posts in Washington that were not abandoned at the beginning of the war. They also protected communications routes between the western and eastern United States in Oregon and Idaho from the Indians and against the threat of foreign intervention on the Pacific coast by Britain and France that never materialized.

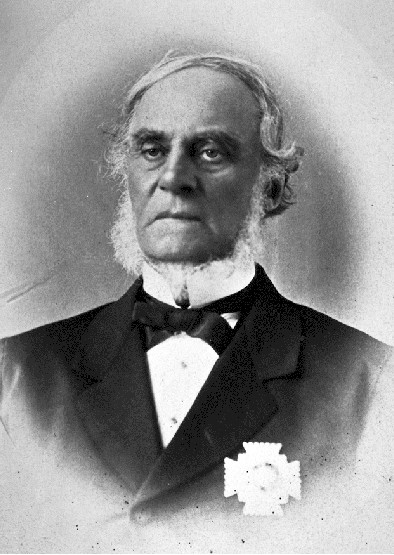
Governor of British Columbia, Sir James Douglas, who pushed for the annexation of Washington Territory during the US Civil War.

On December 28, 1861, during the ongoing Trent Affair, Governor of the Colony of British Columbia James Douglas wrote to Secretary of State for the Colonies Henry Pelham-Clinton, 5th Duke of Newcastle, arguing that Britain should seize the Washington Territory while the US was preoccupied with the Civil War. He reasoned this was possible because there were little to no US troops stationed in the region since most other units stationed there were off to war in the East, the territory's population was scattered, and there were only a few U.S. naval ships in the area. He also said the Royal Navy and Marines were powerful and could easily do the job, ending with a statement that "with Puget Sound, and the line of the Columbia River in our hands, we should hold the only navigable outlets of the country—command its trade, and soon compel it to submit to Her Majesty’s Rule." British officials instead chose to pass on his proposal so as not to risk war with the United States.

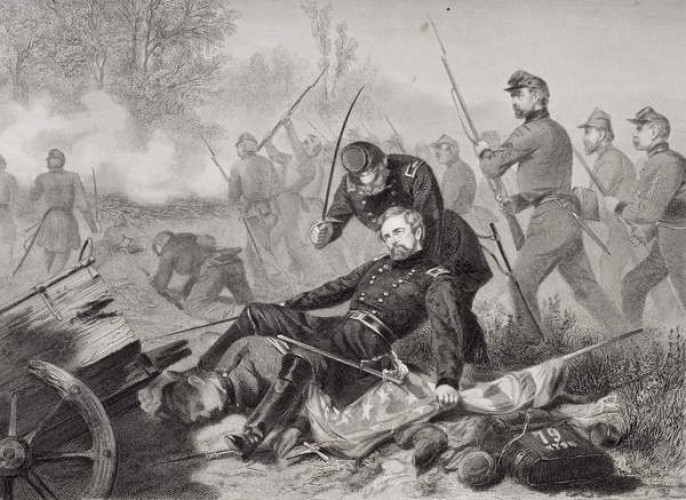
Death of General Isaac Stevens, a lithograph by Alonzo Chappel

The muddled attitude of the Territory would be exemplified by attitudes of the former governors of the state. Former governor Fayette McMullen would go on to join the Confederate Congress and help fight with his southern Democratic brethren. Richard Golson would resign from office, refusing to serve under a Republican president, and would return to his family plantation and help them relocate their slaves and assets to Tennessee. Isaac Stevens on the other hand would (somewhat surprisingly) give up political office and head back east to join the Union Army as a general. He was killed in action at the Battle of Chantilly on September 1, 1862, after picking up the fallen regimental colors of his old regiment, shouting "Highlanders, my Highlanders, follow your general!" Charging with his troops while carrying the banner of Saint Andrew's Cross, Stevens was struck in the temple by a bullet and died instantly.

During this period there was also a political shift, as the state began moving away from the Democrats and to the growing Republican Party. This in part began after President Abraham Lincoln appointed William H. Wallace as the first Republican Governor of the territory. Shortly thereafter Colonel Wallace received the Republican nomination for Congress. After Stevens had left the territory, his Democratic successor, Selucius Garfielde was generally disliked and seem as an opportunist. This led to a split in the Democratic Party between Garfielde and his opponents, allowing Wallace and the Republican Party to win control of the Territory.

Union supporters were upset that the legislature had not adopted a strong stand in support of the Union. Party lines continued to deteriorate as the main single issue now was the Civil War. Republicans referred to Democrats as Copperheads and the Republicans were in turn called Radical Republicans or Black Republicans by the Democrats. While on paper, the Democrats maintained substantial majorities in the late ‘50s and early ‘60s, in reality, it was hard to tell where people stood and loyalties were continually shifting depending upon where one stood on the war, abolition of slavery, and on location of the capital. Minor outbreaks of violence were commonplace, with Republican and Democratic newspaper publishers being shot multiple times during this period.

In 1864 the elections returned another victory for the Democrats, but they were deeply divided and engaged in many public quarrels, injuring their popularity. This combined with the end of the war and the death of Lincoln would all contribute to their fall in popularity. In the election of 1865 the Republicans won their first victory in the Legislature, finally ending the era of Democratic dominance. The new southern president Andrew Johnson (Lincoln's compromise vice president) tried to remove Republican governor William Pickering for his criticisms of how the Johnson administration was handling reconstruction, offering a Democrat named George Cole as his replacement. Initially Pickering tried to fight this decision but eventually conceded.

At this time, Washington was still very politically split, with the growing conflict between Conservative Republican and Radical Republican factions on Reconstruction causing them to narrowly lose their majority. The Democrats too remained split between the pro-Federalist Moderates and anti-Federalist Copperheads. In general though, the previously somewhat contentious stance of pro-Federalism had solidified and instead most controversy surrounded Reconstruction and President Johnson, which was much more split. While the extreme division led to an unproductive session of the Legislature, the one major achievement was the creation of a standardized education system. Early the next year when the National Congress finally reconvened, the majority Moderate Republican US congress removed Governor George Cole, who had been chosen independently by their archnemesis Andrew Johnson.

=== Anti-Asian violence ===
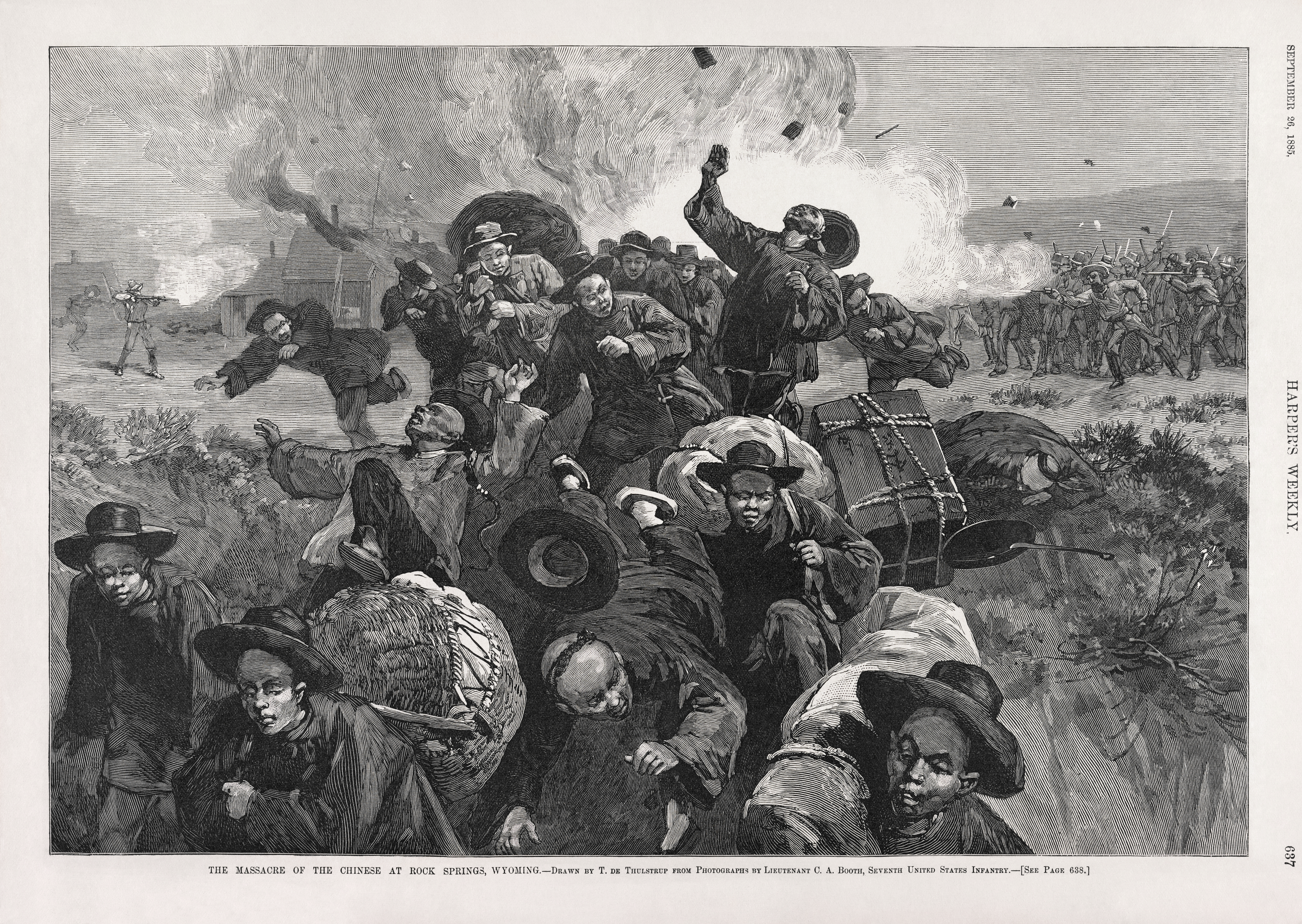
An artist's rendition of the Rock Springs massacre.

Due to increasing amounts of cheap Chinese labor replacing white labor throughout Washington, many of the growing progressive and populist movements were deeply intertwined with anti-Asian sentiment. Asian people were seen as universally backward and inferior, slave-like creatures who were being flooded into the country by wealthy business owners to put real Americans out of their jobs, despite the fact that many had arrived in the region at the same time or earlier than many of the White settlers. During this period, roughly from the mid-1880s to the late 19th century, anti-Asian hate crimes would dramatically increase, ultimately leading to the mass deportation of established Asian American communities.

In 1885 labor tensions led to a calculated Anti-Chinese riot in Tacoma wherein vigilante groups hundreds strong forcefully broke into the homes of any Asians who had not fled the city and brutally assaulted them. By the end of the three days of terror, all 700 Chinese Americans in Tacoma had fled, as their homes and businesses were reduced to ashes.

Inspired by the success of the Tacoma Riot, Anti-Chinese Committees were formed throughout the territory. These organizations were led by the newly founded Washington Territorial Anti-Chinese Congress, who jointly declared that by the end of 1885 all Chinamen were to have left the city or face consequences. As they gained immense popularity they began to pool funds and catalog the Chinese residents throughout Seattle.

In 1886 rioters associated with the Knights of Labor and organized by the Anti-Chinese Congress began a violent riot in Seattle. Going door to door the Committees broke into Chinese owned homes and businesses, kidnapping Chinese residents with the intent of forcing all of them out of Seattle by train or ferry. Meanwhile, more unorganized mobs of angry White citizens began to ransack Chinese areas of the city and accost any Asians they could find. The city broke down into anarchy and governor Watson C. Squire ordered martial law.

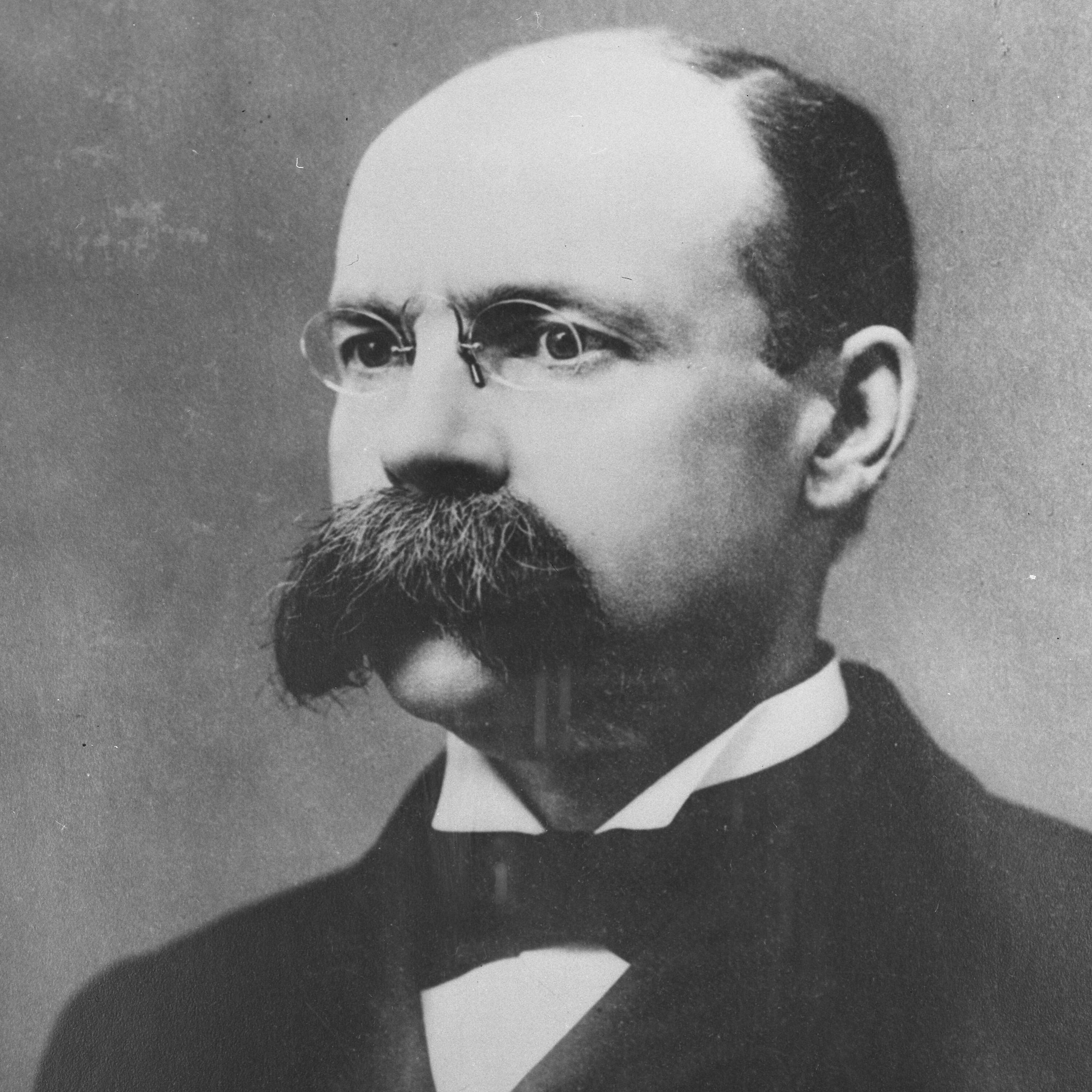
A photograph of John McGraw, who helped lead militias in defense of Chinese American citizens.

A militia called the Seattle's Rifles was quickly formed to deal with the rioters and protect the Chinese citizens who had been abducted from their homes and dragged out into the streets. This militia was led by future state governor and at that time current Seattle Sheriff John McGraw, who was sympathetic to the Knights of Labor but opposed the violent deportation of the Chinese, leading to his relatively centrist position on the affair. Coming into contact with a large mob holding 350 Chinese people in captivity, the Seattle Rifles attempted negotiation before forcefully barging through the crowd, taking the victims into custody, and arresting the leaders of the mob. Rioters tried to wrangle control of the rifles, leading to shots ringing out, whereafter two militia members and three rioters were seriously injured. The riot quickly spiraled into a gunfight.

Amidst the fighting, the Seattle Rangers were mostly able to protect the Chinese citizens in their custody, but in the places they could not reach many Chinese people were successfully shipped out of the city. A few days later president Grover Cleveland ordered Governor Squire to lift Martial Law, as most of the riots had ended, though illegal efforts to deport the Chinese continued (with some success). In the aftermath of the riots, none of the perpetrators would be charged, and the money that the courts allotted for damages to the Chinese citizens were never received. Both the city mayor and McGraw would be unseated in the next elections, primarily for their actions in helping the Chinese. Due to the increased animosity and tension, most Asian citizens in Washington territory would in the following months either migrate to more friendly cities or return to China.

== Statehood and moderate era (1889–1895) ==
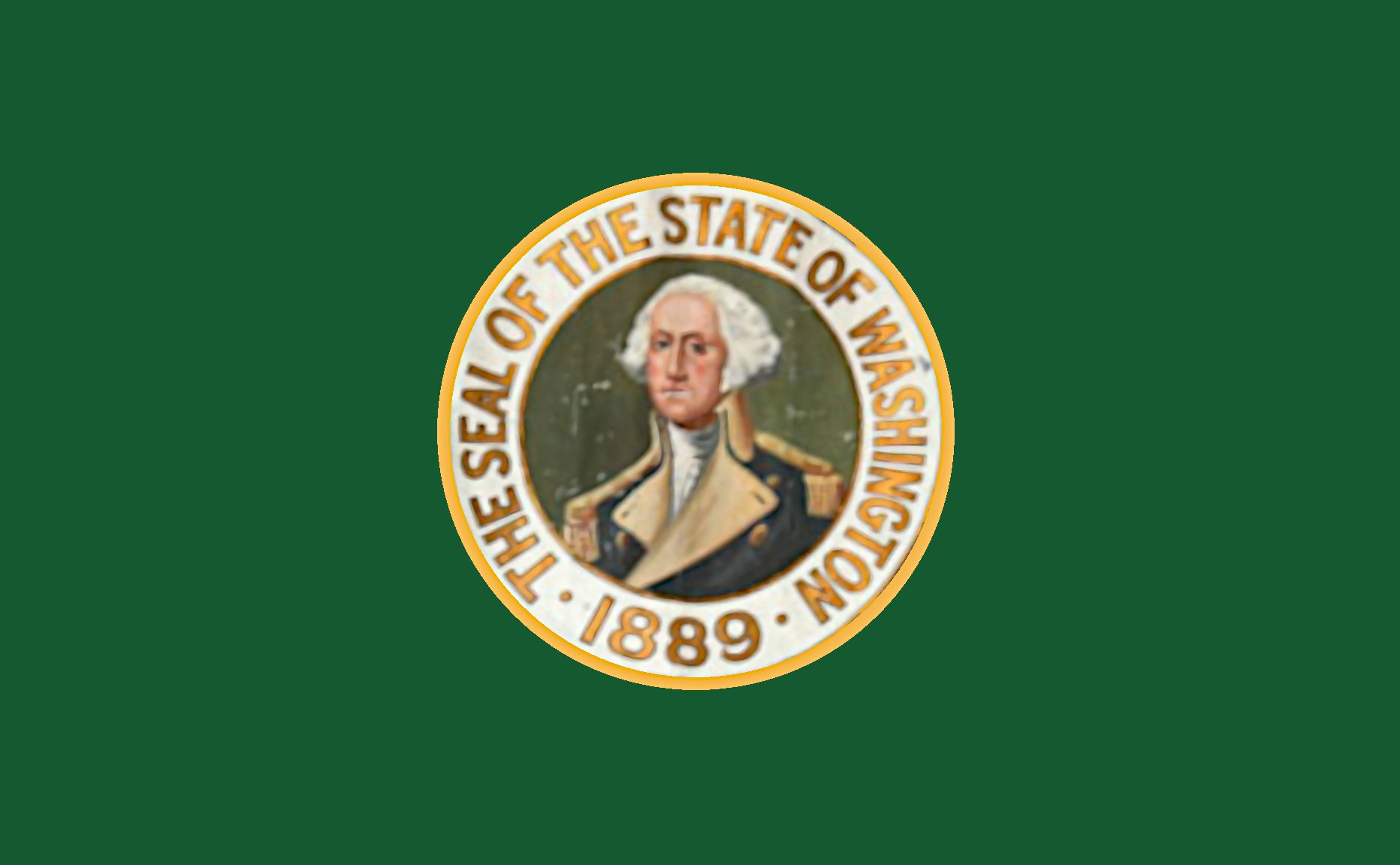
Flag of Washington prior to the 1967 adoption of a new seal and standardization

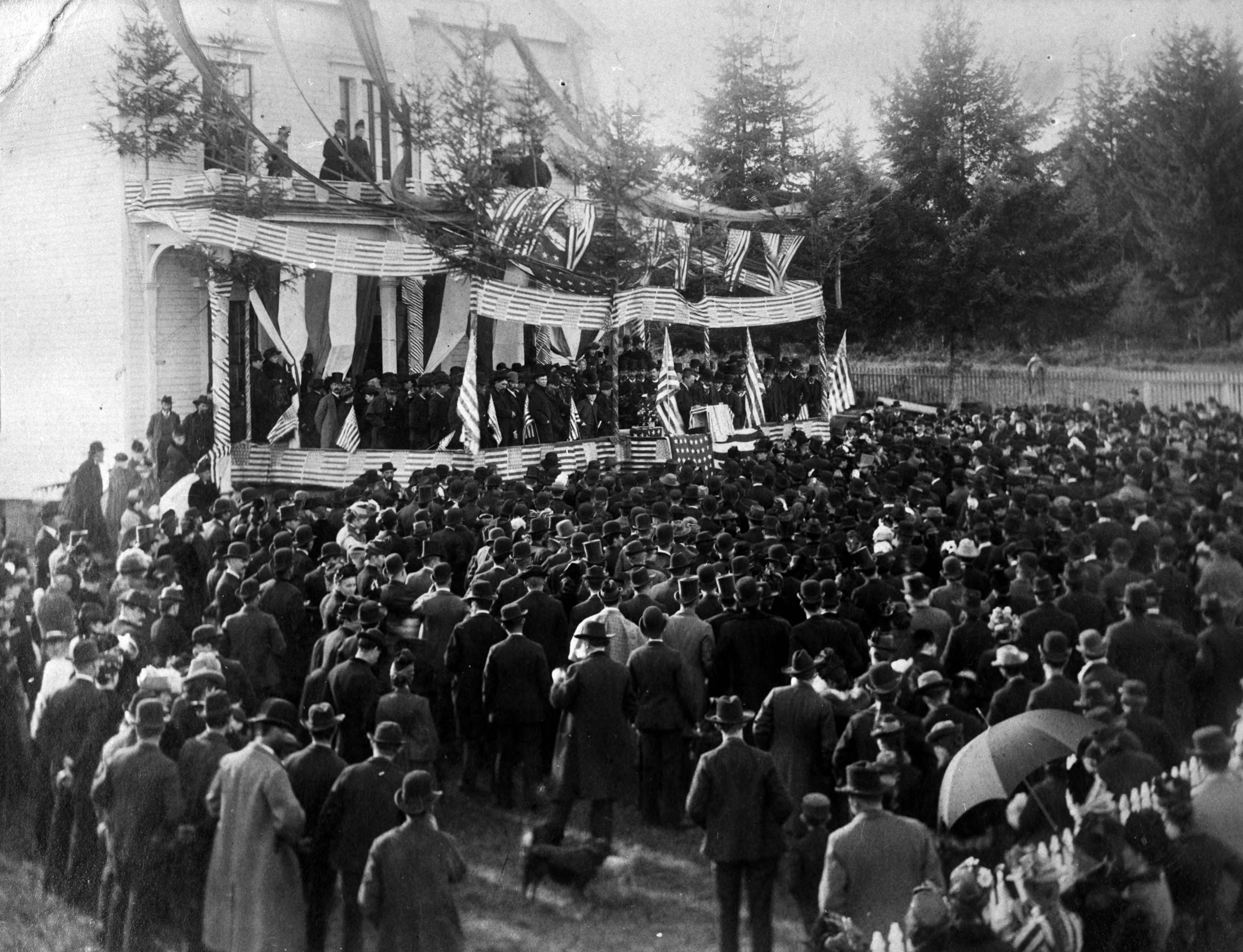
Statehood ceremony in Olympia, November 1889.

After the passage of the Enabling Act of 1889, Washington became the 42nd state in the United States on November 11, 1889. The proposed state constitution, passed by a four-to-one ratio, originally included women's suffrage and prohibition, but both of these issues were defeated and removed from the accepted constitution. Women had previously been given the vote in 1883 by the Washington Territorial Legislature, but the right was rescinded in 1887 by the Washington Territorial Supreme Court as a response to female support of prohibition. Despite these initial defeats, women in the Pacific Northwest received the right to vote earlier than the rest of the country, with Washington passing a suffrage amendment in 1910. Prohibition followed in 1916, two years before the rest of the nation.

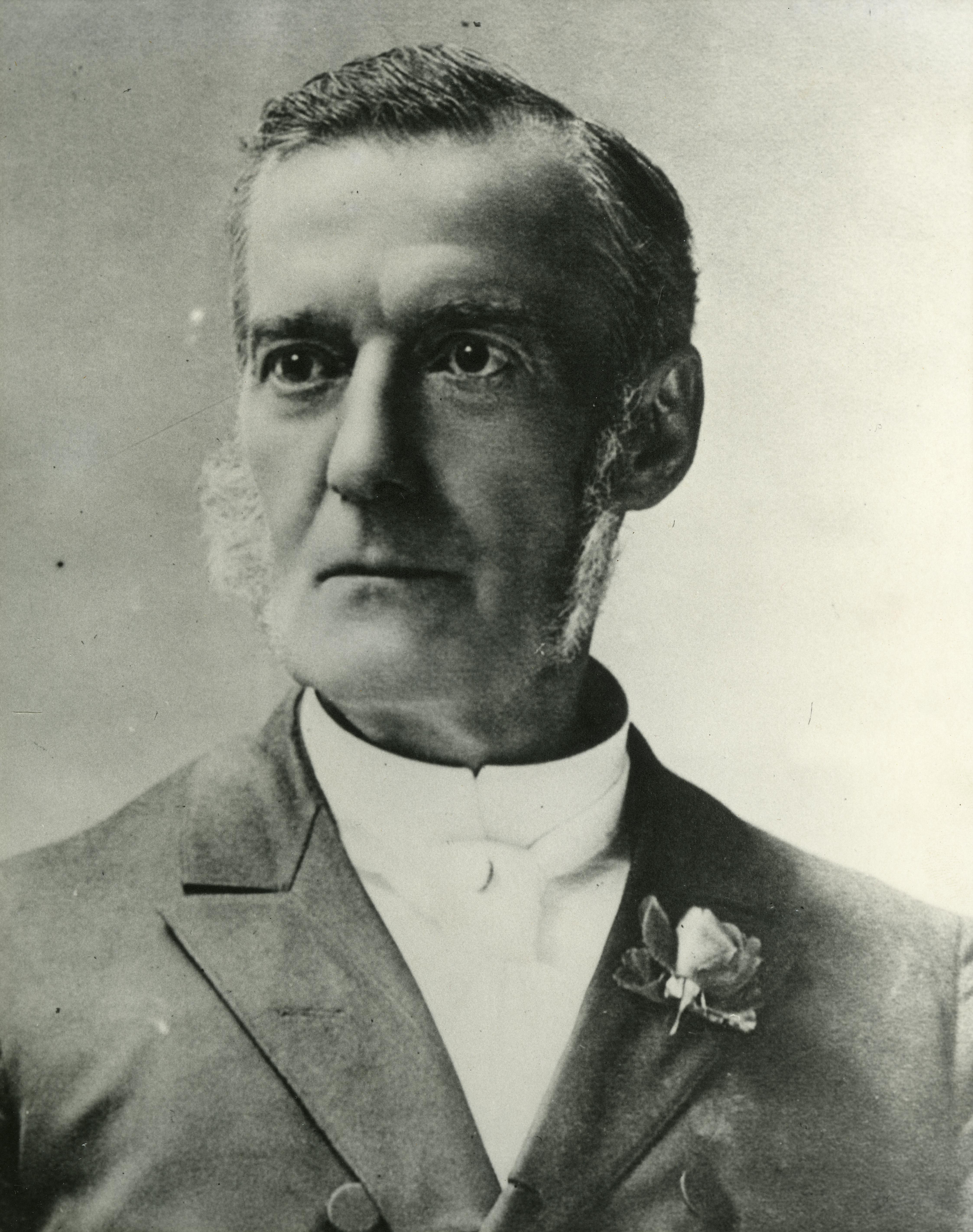
Elisha P. Ferry, the first governor of Washington State.

Narrowly winning election, Republican Elisha P Ferry, former Territorial Governor from almost a decade earlier and Civil War veteran took office as the first governor of Washington State. In the debate over whether Washington's land should be privatized or made public, with Western citizens preferring the former and Eastern citizens preferring the latter, Ferry tried to take a neutral stance. However his commission failed to resolve the dispute in the allotted time allowing the land to fall into the hands of corporations, which led to allegations that he was in the pocket of corporations. The same inference was drawn when Ferry called on the National Guard to put down a miners' strike. Following a costly fire, a local mining company had decided to cut expenses by replacing white mineworkers with black workers at lower wages. The longer the strike lasted, the more the employers saw the advantages of using black labor, and this became their standard policy. Proposals to regulate the railroads and an "Anti-Pinkerton" bill banning the employment of private union busters both were vetoed by temporary acting Governor Laughton, leading to increased support for Populist ideas. Upon his return to the capital Governor Elisha P Ferry essentially ignored the entire issue, leaving Laughton to be the scapegoat.

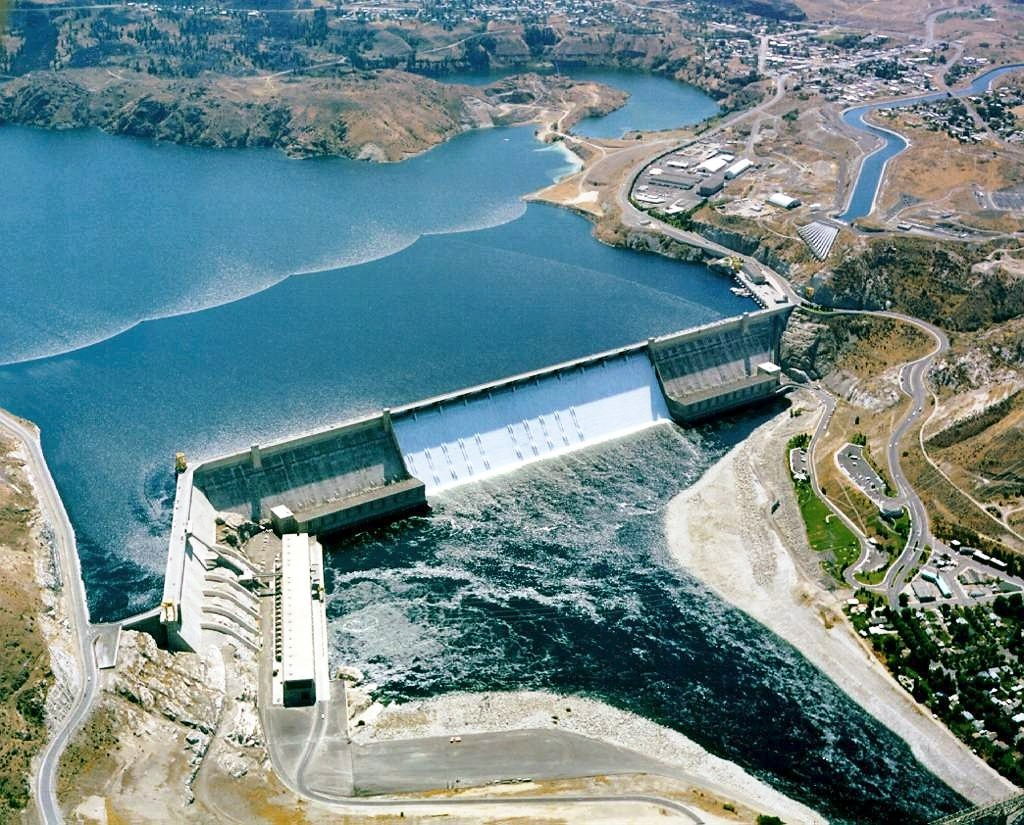
The Grand Coulee Dam was the largest dam in the world at the time of its construction

In 1890, while nationally Democrats won in a landslide, in Washington their gains were only meager, and they remained the minority. During the 1880s Washington had become more and more prosperous, but the Eastern agricultural areas did not share in the prosperity of the cities. In part this was caused by the highly monopolized nature of the new railroads. In addition, rising economic issues led to a crash in 1893 which proved disastrous for the Washingtonian people. This caused a rise in Agrarian Populism throughout the state, and the populists within Washington, who had previously been only a tertiary factor in state/territorial politics began to grow into a defining element.

=== Early economy ===
Early prominent industries in the state included agriculture, lumber, and mining. In eastern Washington, Spokane was a major hub of mining activity and the Yakima Valley was known for its apple orchards and wheat fields. The heavy rainfall to the west of the Cascade Range produced dense forests and the ports along Puget Sound prospered from the manufacturing and shipping of lumber products, particularly the Douglas fir. In 1905, Washington State became the largest producer of lumber in the nation. Seattle was the primary port for trade with Alaska and for a time possessed a large shipbuilding industry. Other industries that developed in Washington include fishing, salmon canning, and mining. For an extended period of time, Tacoma was known for its large smelters where gold, silver, copper and lead ores were treated. The region around eastern Puget Sound developed heavy industry during the period including World War I and World War II and the Boeing Company became an established icon in the area.

== The Populist explosion (1895–1904) ==
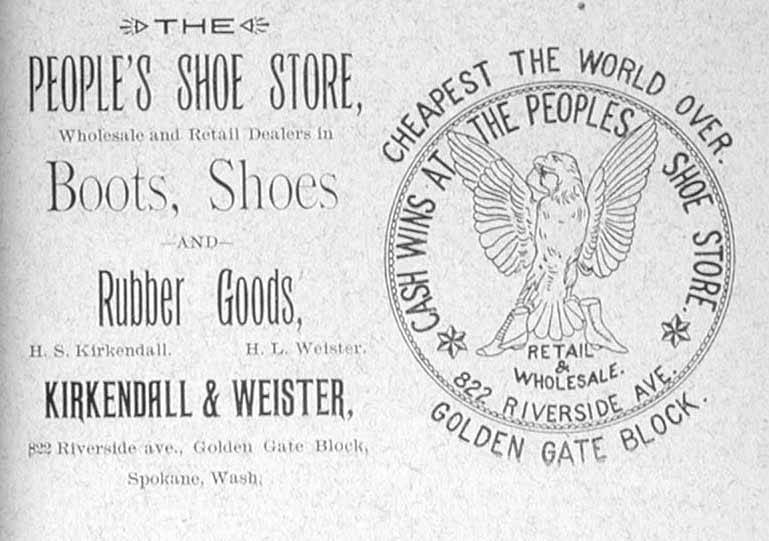
1893 advert from the People's Shoe Store, a business looking to capitalize on the boom of populism throughout the state.

By 1892, the Populists were beginning to push through the roadblocks placed in front of them by the Moderate Republicans. The regulations vetoed by acting Governor Laughton, despite the protests of major lobbyists from the Northern Pacific Railroad, were almost unanimously overridden and signed into law by the new Republican Governor John McGraw. The backlash to Laughton was so severe that the house passed a bill to abolish the position of Lieutenant Governor entirely, though it failed in the senate. Despite these successes for the Populists, they remained a minority (if now a sizeable one) in the State Congress, and the Northern Pacific Railroad had managed to extract concessions from the Republicans, causing the failure of any bills directly trying to regulate the railroads. This would lead to a further rise in Populism, led by a young People's Party member named John Rogers. During the 1895 session, Rogers successfully passed the "Barefoot School-boy" act despite heavy resistance from urban liberals, and unsuccessfully opposed the creation of a state capitol as he believed it was a waste of money.

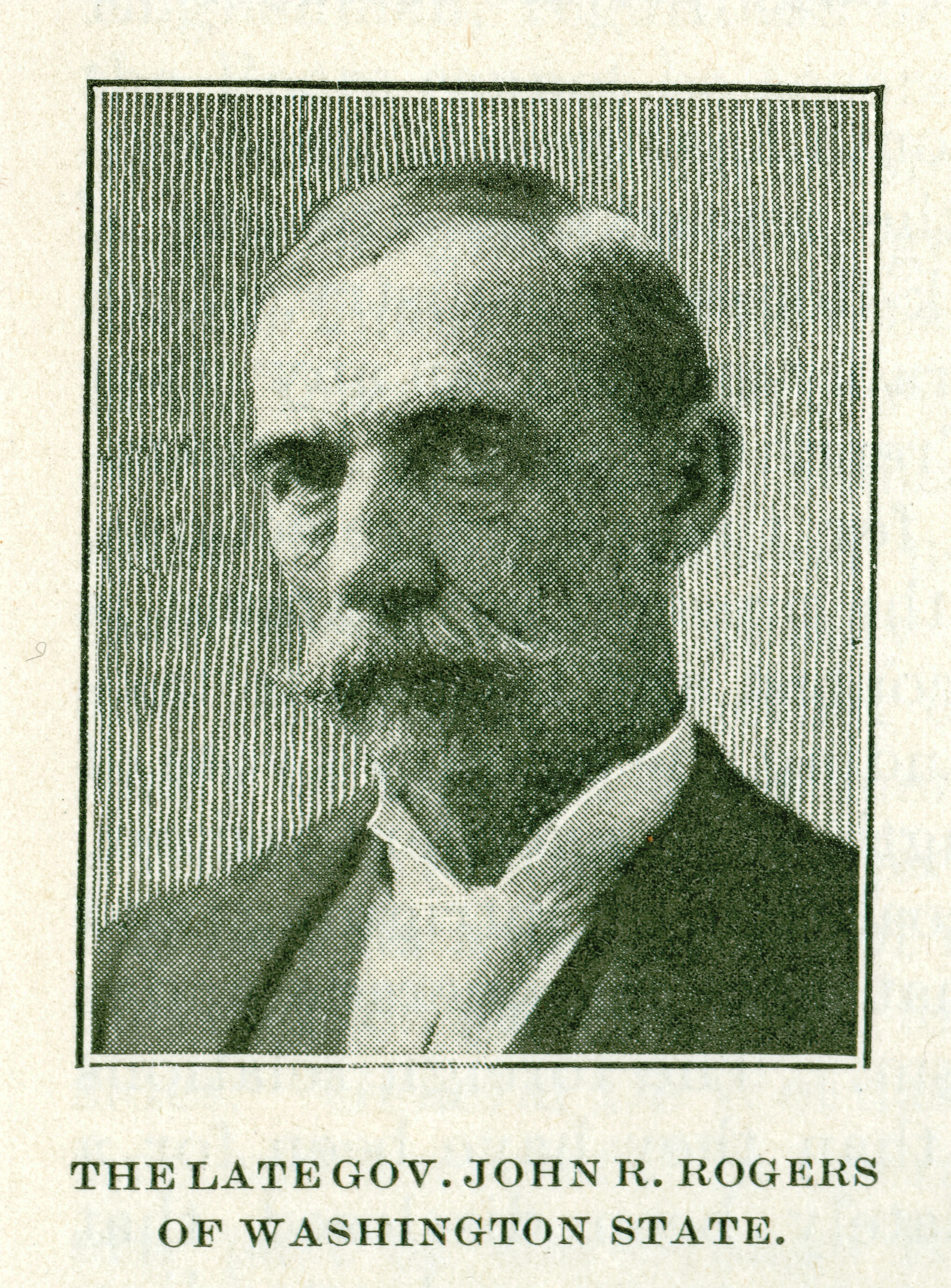
John R. Rogers, third governor of Washington State.

As the national conversation around the silver and gold standard heated up, the dominant Republican Party fractured, with part of it forming the Silver Republicans, which was a more populist alternative to the Republicans. While many of the former Democrats within the People's Party viewed the Silver Republican Party with suspicion, other more pragmatic members convinced them to cooperate. Recognizing their popularity and shared interest, as well as their lack of ability to beat the Republicans individually, the People's Party, Silver Republican Party, and Democratic Party formed a fusion ticket despite great internal conflict. The People's Party dominated the House, having four times more seats than the second largest party the Republicans. John Rogers was also elected as the third governor of Washington State, making him the first and only third-party candidate to win such a high office in the state.

Despite this amazing victory, the fusion proved unstable, and in many cases they were just as slow to make decisions as the Republicans had been. A cornerstone of the Populist platform, the creation of a Railroad Commission, failed in the House by one vote. With their main focus obstructed, their coalition grew increasingly unstable. With internal struggle rumors of corruption began to fly, and the People's Party began to turn on itself and view figures like Rogers with suspicion. Despite these failures, under Rogers the economy saw a revival, which actually worked against him, further shifting political opinion back to moderatism. By 1899 the Populist movement had effectively disintegrated, and failed to pass other proposals such as a Georgist land value tax and female suffrage.

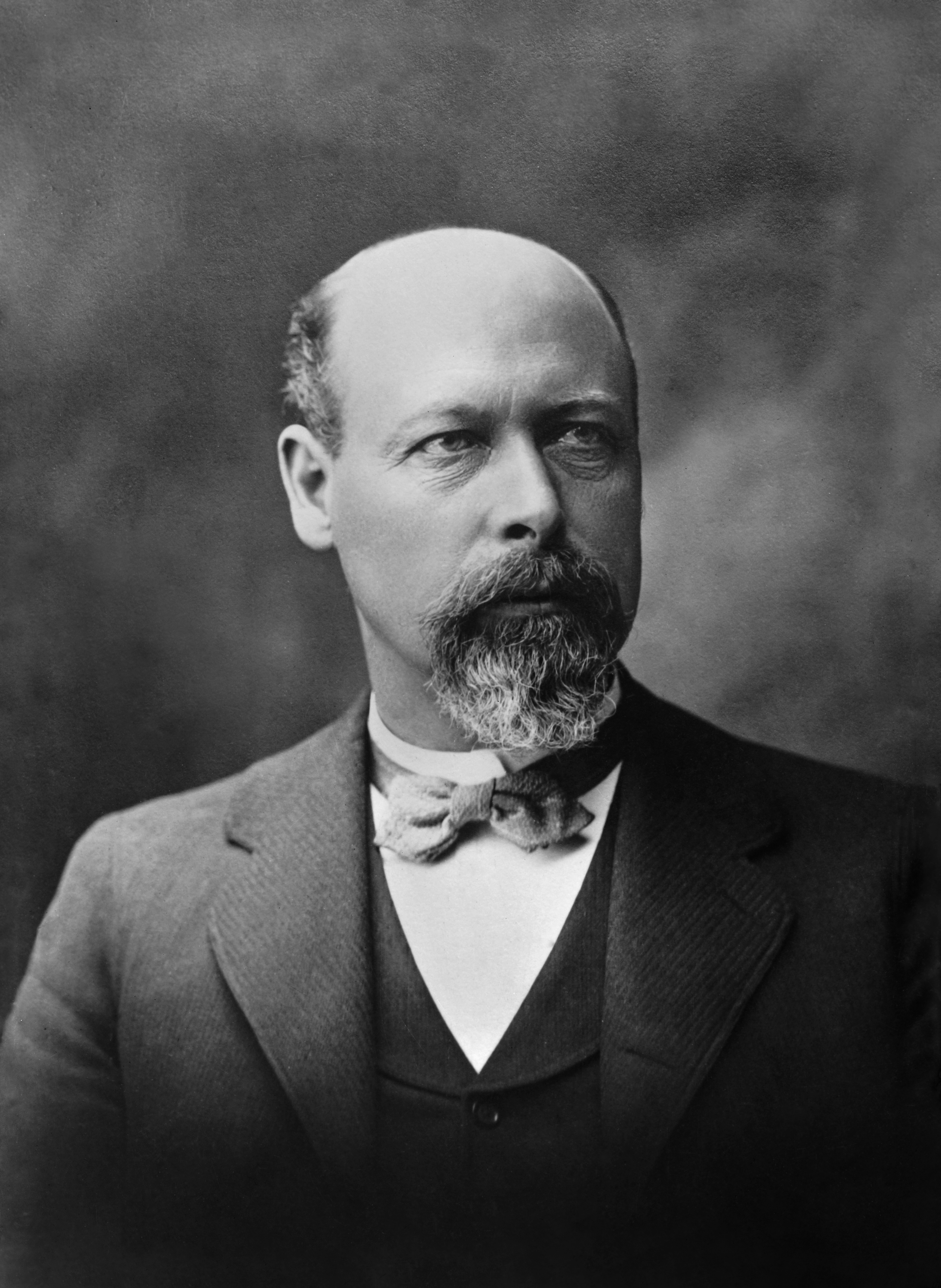
Republican Governor Henry McBride, who successfully fought against the railroads and preserved many Populist policies.

In a surprise for the Republicans, who were expecting and did receive a general sweep in the 1900 elections, Rogers who had formally switched parties and joined the Democrats, was re-elected as governor. This upset was not long to last though, as in 1901 Rogers unexpectedly died. The line of succession promoted the Lieutenant Governor, a Republican named Henry McBride into the office, but rather than reverse Rogers' reforms, McBride actually furthered them. As a progressive Republican, McBride also saw corporations and lobbyists as an impediment to the growth of the state, and strongly pushed for busting monopolies. Under McBride the Republican Party shifted into support of a Railroad Commission in order to separate the railroads from politics, and after the "hardest floor battle" in a decade, with his support the commission finally came into being. With these victories McBride was generally very popular, but his own Republican Party which was heavily supported by, and as many claimed controlled by the railroad companies, began to conspire to prevent his re-election. To this effect after an extended political struggle, the Republican Party voted not to renominate McBride for the 1904 elections. He would later be applauded by historians as one of the state's best governors.

While in the short term, the Populist program was a failure and the fusion party quickly died, within twenty years almost all of their major points would become law. These points included the direct election of Senators, initiative, referendum and recall, a Railroad Commission, and municipal ownership of utilities.

== Progressive era ==
The progressive force of the early 20th century in Washington stemmed partially from the women's club movement which offered opportunities for leadership and political power to tens of thousands of women in the Pacific Northwest region.

== 1920s ==
Bertha Knight Landes was elected mayor of Seattle in 1926, the first woman mayor of a major city in the United States.

In 1924, Seattle's Sand Point Airfield was the endpoint of the first aerial circumnavigation of the world.

== Great Depression ==
Vancouver became the endpoint for two ultra-long flights from Moscow, USSR over the North Pole. The first of these flights were performed by Valery Chkalov in 1937 on a Tupolev ANT-25RD airplane. Chkalov was originally scheduled to land at an airstrip in nearby Portland, Oregon but redirected at the last minute to Vancouver's Pearson Airfield.

During the depression era, a series of hydroelectric dams were constructed along the Columbia River as part of a project to increase the production of electricity. This culminated in 1941 with the completion of the Grand Coulee Dam, the largest in the United States.

== World War II ==
During World War II, the Puget Sound area became a focus for war industries with the Boeing Company producing many of the nation's heavy bombers and ports in Seattle, Bremerton, Vancouver, and Tacoma available for the manufacturing of ships for the war effort. As the demand for labor and the number of young men drafted for service increased simultaneously, women entered the workforce in large numbers, recruited by local media. One-fourth of the laborers in shipyards were women, resulting in the installation of one of the first government-funded child-care centers in the workplace.

In eastern Washington, the Hanford Works nuclear power plant was opened in 1943 and played a major role in the construction of the nation's atomic bombs. One of the atomic bombs (nicknamed 'Fat Man' and dropped on Nagasaki, Japan on August 9, 1945) was fueled by Hanford plutonium and was transported in Boeing B-29s, also designed in Washington State.

== Cold War ==
During the 1960s, Seattle became a center of the burgeoning Civil rights movement. In 1962, Wing Luke was elected to the Seattle City Council, becoming the first Asian American to hold office in the Pacific Northwest. His open-housing ordinance faced serious resistance before ultimately prevailing, thereby preventing discrimination in the selling or renting of Seattle real estate. After his untimely death, the Wing Luke Museum would be opened in 1967 in his honor, displaying the culture, art, and history of Asian Americans.

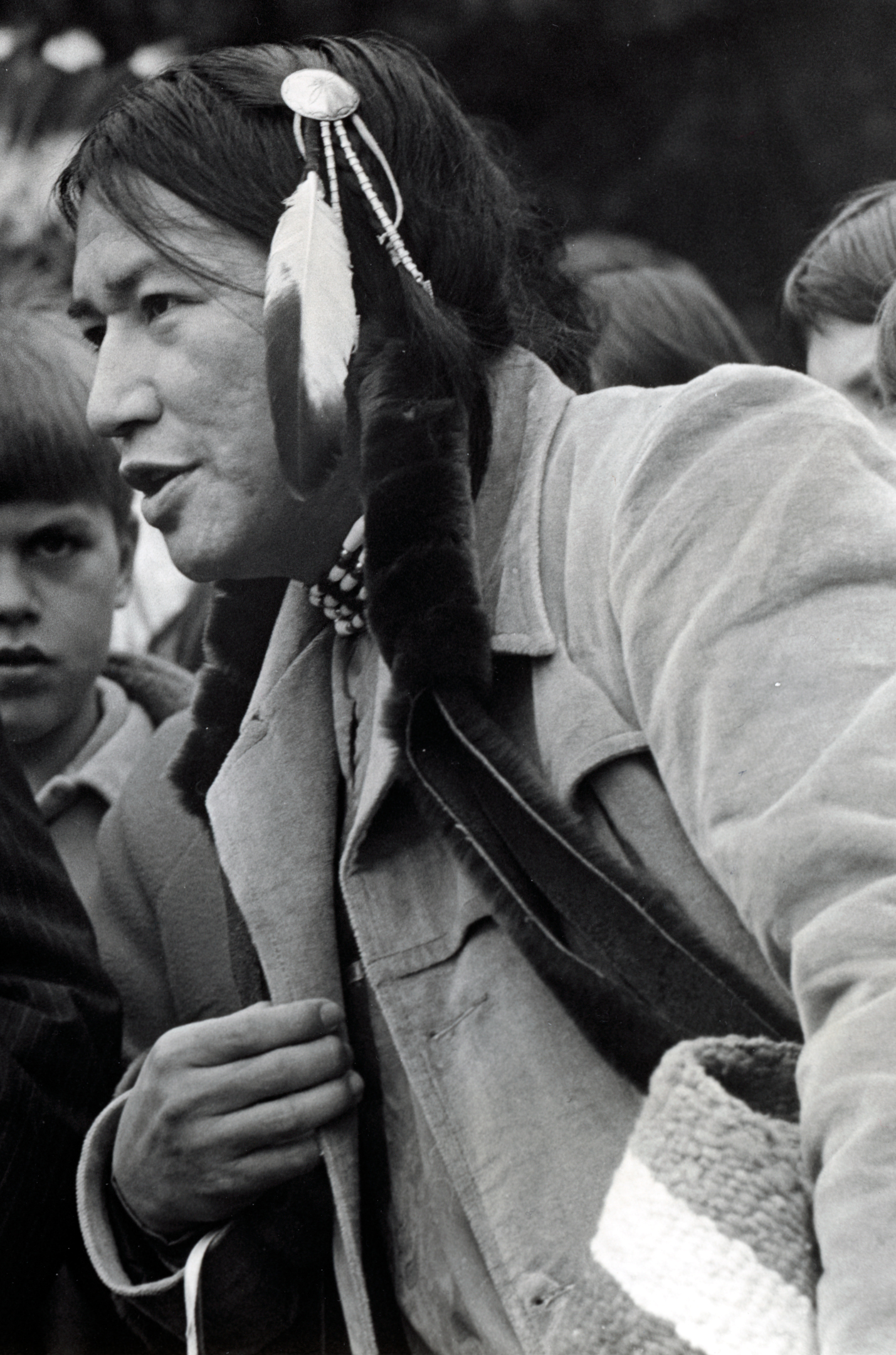
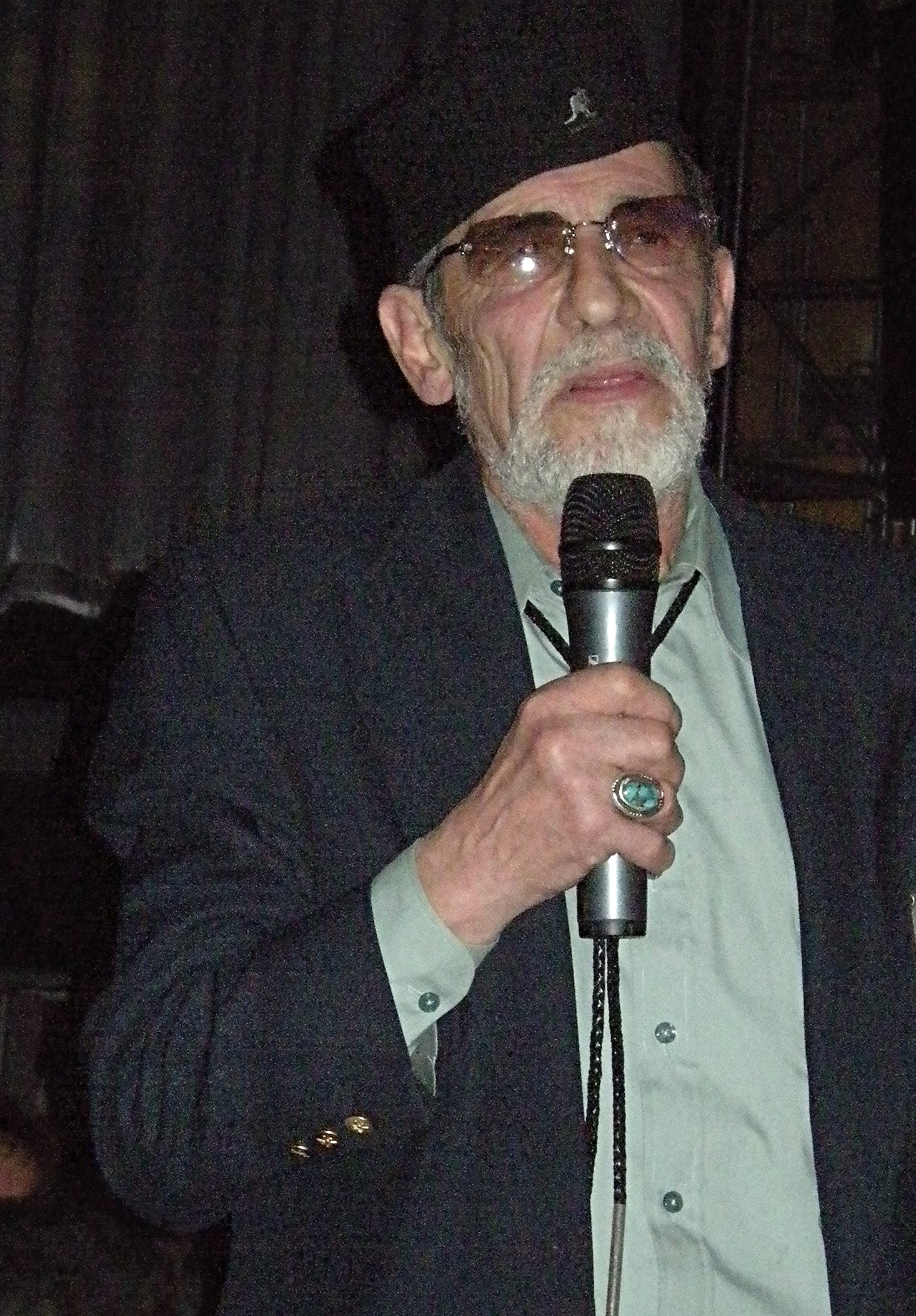
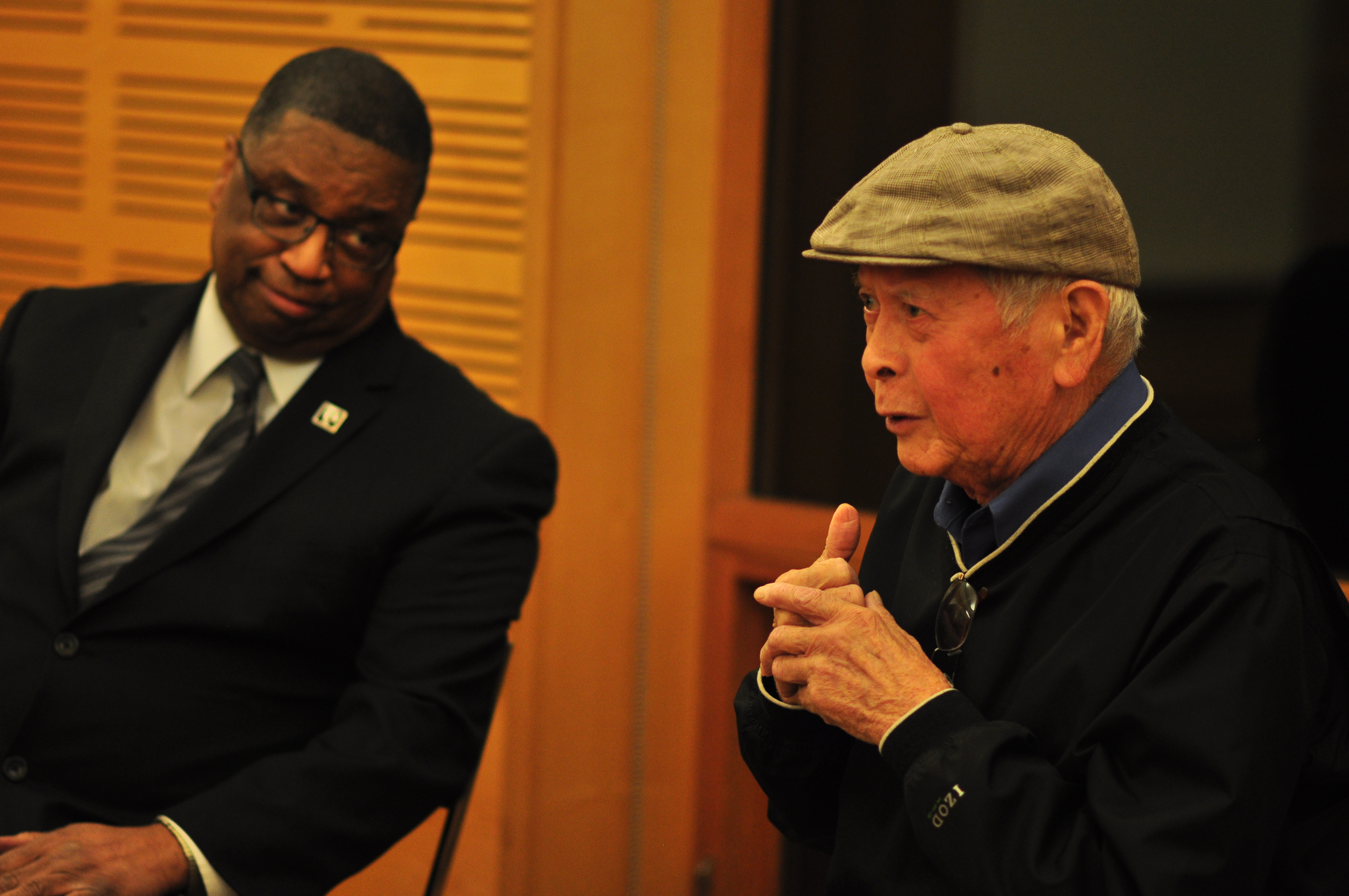
The Gang of Four, clockwise: Bernie Whitebear (1971); Roberto Maestas (2008); Bob Santos and Larry Gossett (2016)

Meanwhile, tensions rose as white fishing companies continued to erode Native American fishing rights that had been established in earlier treaties. This led to a period known as the Fish Wars, wherein Native American activists fought for their rights to traditional fishing areas through "fish-ins" and other protests. Among these activists was the Nisqually environmental leader Billy Frank Jr., who led a decade long campaign for treaty rights and cooperative management of natural resources. These collective efforts led to a major victory in the landmark 1974 Boldt Decision by the US Supreme Court, which reaffirmed the Native's right to fish in the areas designated by the treaties. In 2015, President Barack Obama posthumously awarded Billy Frank Jr. with the Presidential Medal of Freedom, and in 2021 Governor Jay Inslee passed into law a bill replacing Washington's statue of Marcus Whitman in the US Capitol with a statue of Billy.

Another prominent leader of the fish-in movement was Bernie Whitebear, a Native American activist who worked to revitalize Native culture, better Native health, and who was closely associated with the Kinatechitapi (or "All Indian") political group's efforts to occupy Fort Lawton (which was seen as having been built on rightful Native lands). Bernie was a member of Seattle's so called "Gang of Four", a group of radical minority rights activists composed of Whitebear, Asian American community leader Bob Santos, Latino teacher and activist Robert Maestas, and local politician and Black Panther Party member Larry Gosset.

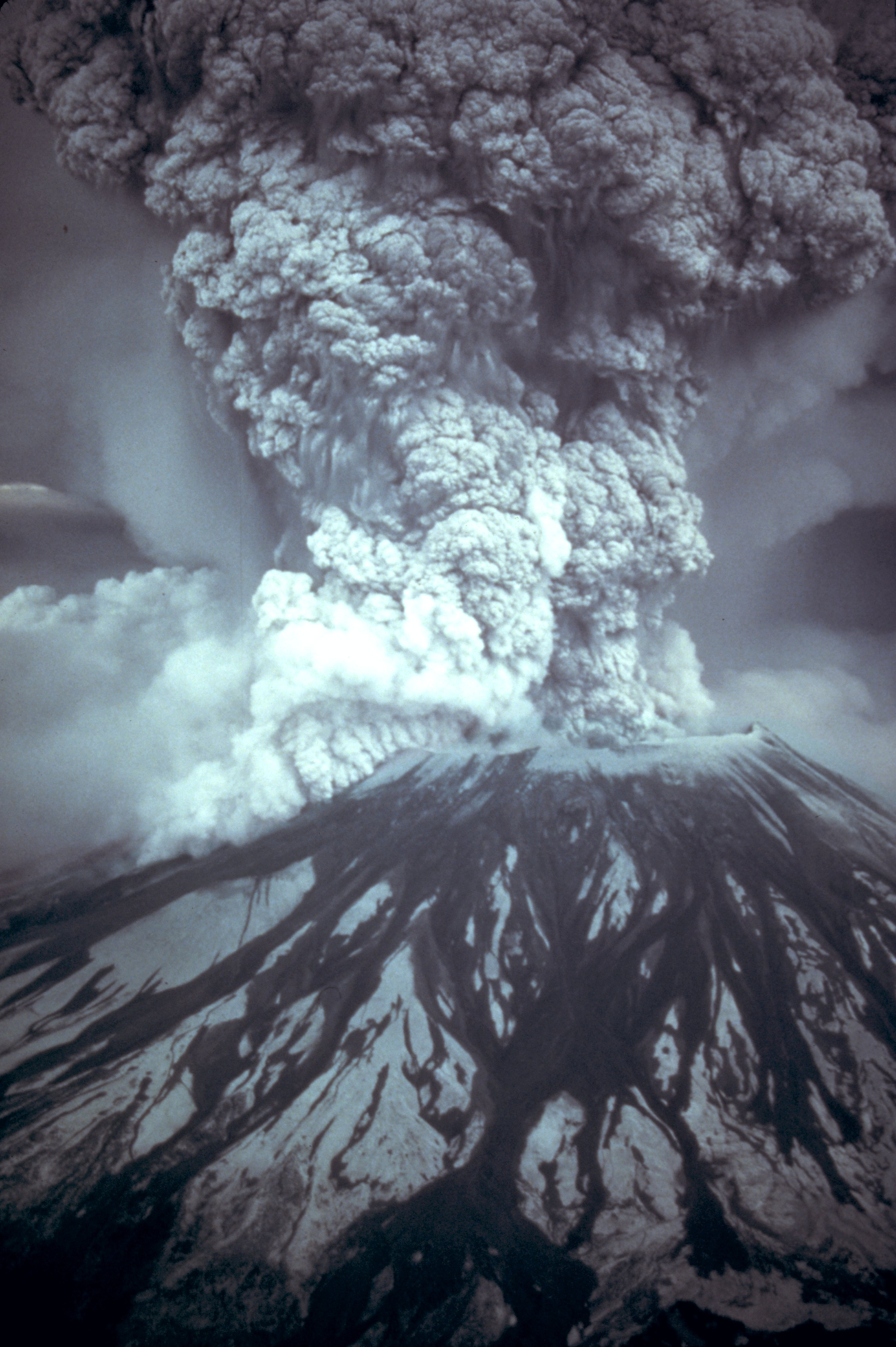
1980 eruption of Mount St. Helens

=== Eruption of Mount St Helens ===
On May 18, 1980, following a period of heavy tremors and eruptions, the northeast face of Mount St. Helens exploded outward, destroying a large part of the top of the volcano. This eruption flattened the forests for many miles, killed 57 people, flooded the Columbia River and its tributaries with ash and mud and blanketed large parts of Washington in ash, making day look like night.

== Contemporary Washington ==
=== Economy ===
Washington is well known for several prominent companies, the most notable of which are Microsoft, Amazon.com, Boeing, Nordstrom, The Bon Marché, Costco, and Starbucks. Monopolies have a long history in the state. Bill Boeing's namesake company grew from a small airplane company in 1916 to the national aircraft and airline conglomerate of Boeing and United Airlines, which was subsequently broken up by anti-trust regulators in 1934.

=== Politics ===
Politics in Washington have been generally Democratic since the 1950s and 60s and President John F. Kennedy's election. The state's system of blanket primaries, in which voters may vote for any candidate on the ballot and are not required to be affiliated with a particular political party, was ruled unconstitutional in 2003. The party-line primary system was instituted for the 2004 presidential and gubernatorial elections. In 2004, voters elected Governor Christine Gregoire into office, making Washington the first state to have a female governor and two female senators, Patty Murray and Maria Cantwell.

Protests against the World Trade Organization (WTO) in Seattle, sometimes referred to as the "Battle of Seattle", took place in 1999 when the WTO convened to discuss trade negotiations. Massive protests of at least 40,000 people included organizations such as NGOs involved in environment issues, labor unions, student groups, religious groups, and anarchists.

On January 30, 2006, Governor Christine Gregoire signed into law legislation making Washington the 17th state in the nation to protect gay and lesbian people from discrimination in housing, lending, and employment, and the 7th state in the nation to offer these protections to transgender people. Initiative activist Tim Eyman filed a referendum that same day, seeking to put the issue before the state's voters. To qualify for the November election, the measure required a minimum of 112,440 voter signatures by 5:00 pm. June 6, 2006. Despite a push from conservative churches across the state to gather signatures on what were dubbed "Referendum Sundays," Eyman was only able to gather 105,103 signatures, more than 7,000 signatures short of the minimum. As a result, the law went into effect on June 7, 2006. The Washington legislature introduced more advanced converge of domestic partnerships in 2008.

== See also ==
- Columbia District
- Historic regions of the United States
- History of the west coast of North America
- History of Latinos in Washington State
- List of historical societies in Washington (state)
- Oregon Country
- Oregon Territory
- Territorial evolution of Washington
- Timeline of Washington (state) history
- Washington Territory
- History of Seattle and Timeline of Seattle

== Older studies ==
- Evans, Elwood; Meany, Edmond S (1893), The State of Washington: A Brief History of the Discovery, Settlement, and Organization of Washington, the "Evergreen State", as well as a Compilation of Official Statistics Showing the Material Development of the State up to Date, Tacoma, WA: World's Fair Commission of the State of Washington.
- Hawthorne, Julian; Brewerton, George Douglas (1893), History of Washington: The Evergreen State, from Early Dawn to Daylight: With Portraits and Biographies, vol. 1, New York: American Historical Publishing | Volume 2.
- Meany, Edmond S. History of the State of Washington, New York: Macmillan, 1909.

=== Primary sources ===
- Meany, Edmond S.; Condon, John T. (eds.), Washington's First Constitution, 1878 and Proceedings of the Convention (PDF), archived from the original (PDF) on January 13, 2015. Reprinted from the Washington Historical Quarterly, 1918–1919.
