= History of Washington =

History of Washington may refer to:

- History of Washington (state)
- History of Washington, D.C.
