= Posse comitatus =

Aspect of common law

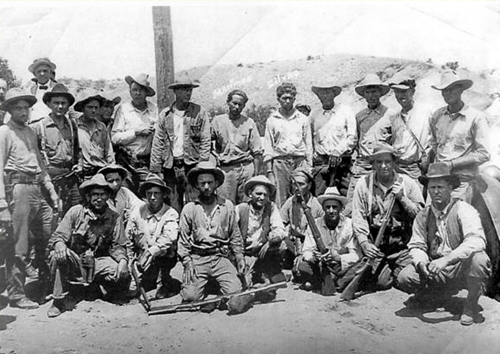
An American posse in 1922, which captured the outlaws Manuel Martinez and Placidio Silvas, who are in the center of the back row. Martinez and Silvas were arrested for the Ruby Murders after the largest manhunt in the history of the Southwest.

The posse comitatus (/ˌpɒs.i ˌkɒm.ɪ.ˈteɪ.təs, -.ˈtɑː.təs/; from Latin for "force of the county" or "ability to have a retinue or gang" (Note: The Latin noun comitātus, which is in the genitive case in this phrase, can refer to either a county, a troop of soldiers, or an association in general, hence the multiple translations.)), frequently shortened to posse, is in common law a group of people mobilized to suppress lawlessness, defend the people, or otherwise protect the peace, property, and public welfare. It may be called by the conservator of peace – typically a reeve, sheriff, chief, or another special/regional designee like an officer of the peace potentially accompanied by or with the direction of a justice or a parajudicial process given the imminence of actual damage. There must be a lawful reason for a posse, which can never be used for lawlessness. The posse comitatus as a doctrine defined in English jurisprudence dates back to 9th-century England.

== Etymology ==
Derived from Latin, posse comitātūs ("posse" here used as a noun meant the ability or power, but meaning "the force" since the medieval times, while "comitatus" is an abstract noun which means a retinue, but since the medieval times, standing for a "commissioned body" especially a small military force or bodyguard) is sometimes shortened to simply posse from the mid-17th century onward to describe the force itself more than the legal principle. While the original meaning refers to a group of citizens assembled by the authorities to deal with an emergency (such as suppressing a riot or pursuing felons and outlawry), the term is also used for any force or band, especially with hostile intent, often also figuratively or humorously. In 19th-century usage, posse comitatus also acquired the generalized or figurative meaning. In its earliest days, the posse comitatus was subordinate to the king, country, and local authority.

== England and Wales ==
=== Middle Ages ===
The posse comitatus as a doctrine in English jurisprudence dates back to 9th-century England and the campaigns of Alfred the Great. It existed in ancient custom and the law of locally martialed forces, and simultaneous thereafter with the officiation of sheriff nomination to keep the regnant peace (known as "the Queen/king's peace").

=== English Civil War ===
In 1642, during the early stages of the English Civil War, local forces were employed everywhere and by both sides. The powers responsible produced valid written authority, inducing the locals to assemble. The two most common authorities used were the Militia Ordinance on the side of the Parliamentarians and that of the king, the old-fashioned Commissions of Array. But the Royalist leader in Cornwall, Sir Ralph Hopton, indicted the enemy before the grand jury of the county as disturbers of the peace, and had the posse comitatus called out to expel them.

=== In law ===
The powers of sheriffs in England and Wales for posse comitatus were codified by section 8 of the Sheriffs Act 1887, the first subsection of which stated that:

Every person in a county shall be ready and apparelled at the command of the sheriff and at the cry of the country to arrest a felon whether within a franchise or without, and in default shall on conviction be liable to a fine, and if default be found in the lord of the franchise he shall forfeit the franchise to the Queen, and if in the bailiff he shall be liable besides the fine to imprisonment for not more than one year, or if he have not whereof to pay the fine, than two years.

— section 8, Sheriffs Act 1887 (as passed)

This permitted the sheriff of each county to call every civilian to his assistance to catch a person who had committed a felony – that is, a serious crime. It provided for fines for those who did not comply. The provisions for posse comitatus were repealed by the Criminal Law Act 1967. The second subsection provided for the sheriff to take "the power of the county" if he faced resistance while executing a writ, and provided for the arrest of resisters. This subsection is still in force. This power can be used during the execution of a writ of seizure and sale to satisfy a debt; it allows a sheriff to call upon the police while seizing the property.

In 2012 posse comitatus was used to remove Occupy London protesters from the precincts of St Paul's Cathedral.

== United States ==
The posse comitatus power continues to exist in those common-law states that have not expressly repealed it by statute. As an example, it is codified in Georgia under OCGA 17–4–24:

Every law enforcement officer is bound to execute the penal warrants given to him to execute. He may summon to his assistance, either in writing or orally, any of the citizens of the neighborhood or county to assist in the execution of such warrants. The acts of the citizens formed as a posse by such officer shall be subject to the same protection and consequences as official acts.

In some states, especially in the western United States, sheriffs and other law enforcement agencies have called their civilian auxiliary groups "posses". The Lattimer Massacre of 1897 illustrated the danger of such groups and thus ended their use in situations of civil unrest. Posse comitatus in the US became not an instrument of royal prerogative but an institution of local self-governance. The posse functioned through, rather than upon, the local popular will. From 1850 to 1878, the United States federal government had expanded its power over individuals. This was done to safeguard national property rights for slaveholders, emancipate millions of enslaved African Americans, and enforce the doctrine of formal equality. The rise of the federal state, like the marketplace before it, had created contradictory but congruous forces of liberation and compulsion upon individuals.

In the early decades of the United States, before slavery became a major conflict, federal use of posse comitatus in the states was rare. But the federal posse comitatus, quite literally, had compelled all of the United States to accept the legitimacy of slavery. In an exhaustive study of lynching in Colorado, historian Stephen Leonard defines lynching to include the people's courts and even posses, which by definition were led by sheriffs.

In the United States, a federal statute known as the Posse Comitatus Act, enacted in 1878, limits the use of the US Army (and, as amended, the US Air Force, Navy, Marine Corps, and Space Force), as a posse comitatus or for law enforcement purposes without the approval of Congress. The act originally did not mention branches of the military other than the Army (and subsequently the Air Force after its establishment), leading the US Department of the Navy and the US Secretary of Defense to prescribe equivalent regulations prohibiting the use of other branches for domestic law enforcement. In 2021, the National Defense Authorization Act for Fiscal Year 2022 amended the Act to formally apply the same restrictions to the domestic use of the Navy, Marine Corps, and Space Force. The limitation does not apply to the National Guard of the United States when activated by a state's governor and operating under Title 32 of the US Code, such as deployments by state governors in response to Hurricane Katrina.

=== Notable posses ===
In 1856, in response to the dispatch of militia by the governor of Washington Territory, Isaac Stevens, to arrest Francis A. Chenoweth, the chief justice of the territory's supreme court, who was holding court in the Pierce County Courthouse, the sheriff of Pierce County deputized 50 to 60 civilians for the defense of the court. Negotiations ultimately resolved the standoff; the militia withdrew.

In 1897 the sheriff of Luzerne County, Pennsylvania, deputized 100 civilians to supplement 50 deputy sheriffs in confronting 400 striking mine workers at the Lattimer Mines. The posse fired at the strikers, killing 19 workers in what became known as the Lattimer massacre.

In 1994, violent bank robbers fled from Mineral County, Colorado, into remote Hinsdale County, Colorado, which at the time had two law enforcement officers for its 500 residents. The county sheriff summoned the county's power, directing more than 100 deputized civilians and 200 out-of-town police officers in house-to-house searches for the fugitives. The robbers committed suicide as the posse closed in on their location.

=== Legal status ===
Following the Baltimore riot of 1968, 1,500 lawsuits were filed against the city of Baltimore seeking compensation for damages sustained due to the failure of the police to suppress the unrest. The city sought declaratory judgment arguing that it could not be liable for any failures of the Baltimore municipal police, as it was an agency of the State of Maryland and the city had no law enforcement authority. In rejecting the argument, the Maryland Court of Appeals observed that Baltimore, as an independent city and – therefore – a county equivalent, was still in possession of the ability to summon the power of the county as that right had not explicitly been repealed by statute and, therefore, remained part of the common law. The court noted:

We are therefore of the opinion that the powers associated with that of a conservator of the peace and the power to form a "posse comitatus," which is included in the powers of a conservator of the peace, were powers available for employment by the City, through the Mayor, should the exercise of reasonable diligence have dictated that they be used.

In the Journal of Criminal Law and Criminology, David Kopel observed that almost all US states provide statutory authority for sheriffs, or other local officials, to summon the county's power. In many cases, civil and criminal penalties are prescribed for members of the public who shirk posse duty when summoned; South Carolina provides that "any person refusing to assist as one of the posse ... shall be guilty of a misdemeanor and, upon conviction shall be fined not less than thirty nor more than one hundred dollars or imprisoned for thirty days" while in New Hampshire a fine of "not more than $20" has been set.

Title 42, section 1989, of the United States Code extends the authority to summon the power of the county to United States magistrate judges when necessary to enforce their orders:

... persons so appointed shall have authority to summon and call to their aid the bystanders or posse comitatus of the proper county, or such portion of the land or naval forces of the United States, or of the militia, as may be necessary to the performance of the duty with which they are charged ...

== See also ==
- Citizens Patrol
- Commandeering – Military or police taking control of private property
- Community Policing
- Conscription – Compulsory enrollment into national or military service
- Hue and cry – Means of community policing
- Ku Klux Klan raid (Inglewood)
- Maxton Raid
- Misprision – Failure to report a crime
- Neighborhood Watch
- Vigiles
- Vigilantism in the United States of America
