= History of Latinos in Washington State =

Demographic's history in Washington, USA

The current population of Latinos in Washington is about thirteen percent, as of 2023. Being the second largest ethnic group in the state, Latinos have made their mark in the state. From being a part of Spanish expeditions to fighting for workers rights. Latinos have lived in the state before it even became established as one, playing a part in the establishment and culture of the state.

== History ==
Before colonization, there were a variety of indigenous tribes throughout the state. Their territories were in modern-day locations such as the Olympic Peninsula, Puget Sound, and Port Townsend. The tribes in these areas were the Kwakwakaʼwakw, Nuu-chah-nulth, Makah, Coast Salish, Chimakum, Quileute, and Chinook.

=== European settlement ===
In 1773, present day San Blas, Nayanit, Mexico, the ship Santiago, constructed and manned by a Mexican crew, sailed to the current Pacific Northwest. The ship was then led by a Spanish Captain Juan José Pérez Hernández on an expedition for New Spain in 1774, making claims on land before other Europeans could.

Later expeditions would establish settlements in the 1790s. One of the settlements being in Neah Bay (Bahía de Núñez Gaona), located in the Olympic Peninsula. The settlement was mainly built by the Mexican crewmembers of the Spanish expeditions, making it their creations. In 1790 Neah Bay was claimed by Manuel Quimper and named the bay after Alonso Núñez de Haro y Peralta in honor of him. There was an attempt to build a fort in 1792 by Salvador Fidalgo but it inevitably failed, the support for it went towards the colony of Santa Cruz de Nuca on Vancouver Island. Spain would later sell the parts of Washington they claimed and other land in the Adams–Onís Treaty to the U.S. in 1819.

=== Before statehood ===
When the land was sold to the U.S. after their land disputes, Mexican workers were still living on the land and as well as states in the surrounding area. Latinos occupying the state after the treaty got to take part in the developing economies. The businesses being in fur trapping and mining, but not in the way many would suspect. They had created a mule-pack system, that mainly benefitted the mining economy in Walla Walla. Thus eventually, developing commercial transportation throughout the Pacific Northwest and fostering a large Mexican population in the state. This system would eventually slowly retire with the invention of the railroad by the late 1870s.

=== After statehood ===
World War II was when the need for labor was at its highest. With the incarceration of Japanese-Americans, there had been a shortage in farm workers. Thus turning to Chicano and Mexican workers. Those who work during WWII were given the name "Braceros" and mainly worked in the Yakima Valley doing agricultural labor and then in the railroad industry between 1942 and 1947. With the need for a massive amount of migrant workers, they were given terrible treatment such as racism, inadequate housing and low pay. Leading them to strike for better conditions. While the conditions were lacking, Yakima Valley was slowly becoming an entryway for Latinos to spread throughout the state to places like Puget Sound and Skagit Valley.

==== Latino communities across Washington ====
The community in Yakima Valley continued to grow, with movie houses, restaurants, cafés and a radio show that would report in Spanish made by Herminia Mendez. Throughout the 1960s the Latino community in Yakima Valley decided to move throughout the state to places such as Renton in South Seattle to open many Mexican restaurants. While those also in South Seattle, were still a part of the working class, others in West Seattle would buy homes called "Boeing box" homes because of the inexpensive price.

By 1967, the community in South Seattle had created the Club Social Hispano-Americano. Which was influenced by the community that was previously in Yakima Valley. The club had a 'Queen' and 'Princesses', Raquel Saragoza was made 'Queen' and Renta Valle and Maryanne Medina were the 'Princesses'. With this theme, they held "dress up" dances. Which were sponsoring bailes grandes, a term that originated from El Baile Grande. A show of their real work was on weekends, with picnics that gathered the community in discussions on improving the lives of the Latino community.

Years later the communities efforts would come into fruition, with many Spanish-speaking organizations coming together to address their problems at the Washington Plaza Hotel. Catching the attention of the Seattle City Council and creating the Latino community center on October 12, 1972, named El Centro de la Raza, founded by Roberto Maestas as well as others and has its doors still opened to this day. El Centro would eventually take part in international struggles, like taking in Nicaraguan exiles and sending in delegations to help the towns in the country. Along with help in social justice work in the State of Washington and California.

==== Chicano Movement ====
In 1968, during the summer, the Chicano movement slowly started to grow into the state with groups like United Mexican American Students, the Brown Berets, and Movimiento Estudiantil Chicana/o de Aztlan, and more. The Seattle campus of University of Washington caught the most attention. With the recruitment of 35 Mexican Americans by the university's Black Student Union (BSU), who actively fought against the school with a 4-hour sit-in at the office of the University President, Charles Odegaard for their inclusion. The continuation of their success with more recruitment from east of Washington's farm towns. The 35 students would then go on to form the first chapter of the United Mexican American Students (UMAS), heavily inspired by the recent farm worker movement in 1965. The group consisted of Jose Correa, Antonio Salazar, Eron Maltos, Jesus Lemos, Erasmo Gamboa, Eloy Apodaca, and others as well. Chicanos, union members and religious groups, decided to start a Grape Boycott near the university. Later this political movement heavily affected the students with the disenfranchment of Latinos that would have been eligible to vote with literacy tests meant to deter, this only made them more united than before. The Washington American Civil Liberties Union (ACLU) then stepped in and forced Yakima County to give them their voting rights that were given to everyone under the law, as well as bilingual ballots.

Guadalupe Gamboa and Tomas Villanueva heard about the boycott and decided to co-found the United Farm Worker's Co-operative (UFWC), which became the first activist Chicano organization in the state.

It was not until 1970 when the Washington State Commission on Mexican American Affairs was established. Later, appointing community voted commissioners in 1971.

The amount of community from Chicanos in the 70s would inspire the emergence of the Immigrant Right Movement in 2006. In an effort to oppose HR 4437, a bill that if passed would have affected more than just Latinos immigrants. Thus to spread the message of the bill's harm and what it would cause, the Pacific Northwest MEChA Region (PNMR) organized an event that disputed what the media said about bill being aimed at solely Latinos.

=== Current ===
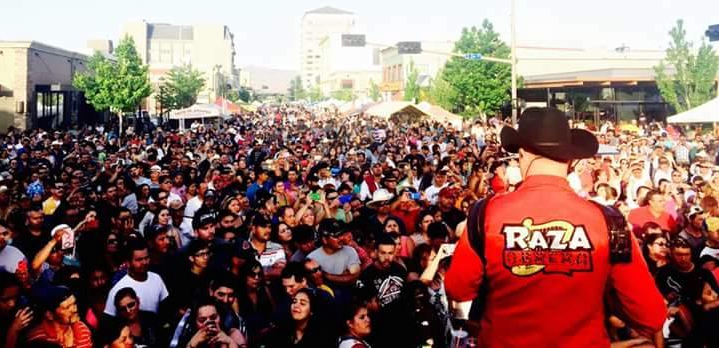
Concert in Yakima, Washington

A first Latino caucus was created in Washington State Legislature, named The Latino Democratic Caucus (LDC). Made with the goal to support the Latino people in the state and recognize laws that could benefit them. Current members are made up of Bill Ramos, Rebecca Saldaña, Emily Alvarado, Tarra Simmons, Javier Valdez, Monica Stonier, Julio Cortés, Sharlett Mena, Emily Randall, and Kristine Reeves.
