= Martial law in Pierce County =

Martial law in Pierce County in the Washington Territory was declared on April 3, 1856, and terminated the following month. It led to a brief, but bloodless, armed conflict between conscripted forces of the Sheriff of Pierce County and the de facto personal army of the territory's leader, Isaac Stevens.

== Background ==
The Yakima War between the Yakama tribe and its allies, and the Washington Territory backed by the United States and its tribal allies, erupted in 1855. With the onset of winter, Gen. John E. Wool decided to cease military operations until spring, but territorial Governor Isaac Stevens convened the Washington Legislature where he declared "the war shall be prosecuted until the last hostile Indian is exterminated."

== Arrest of the Muck Creek settlers ==
Proclamation of Martial Law
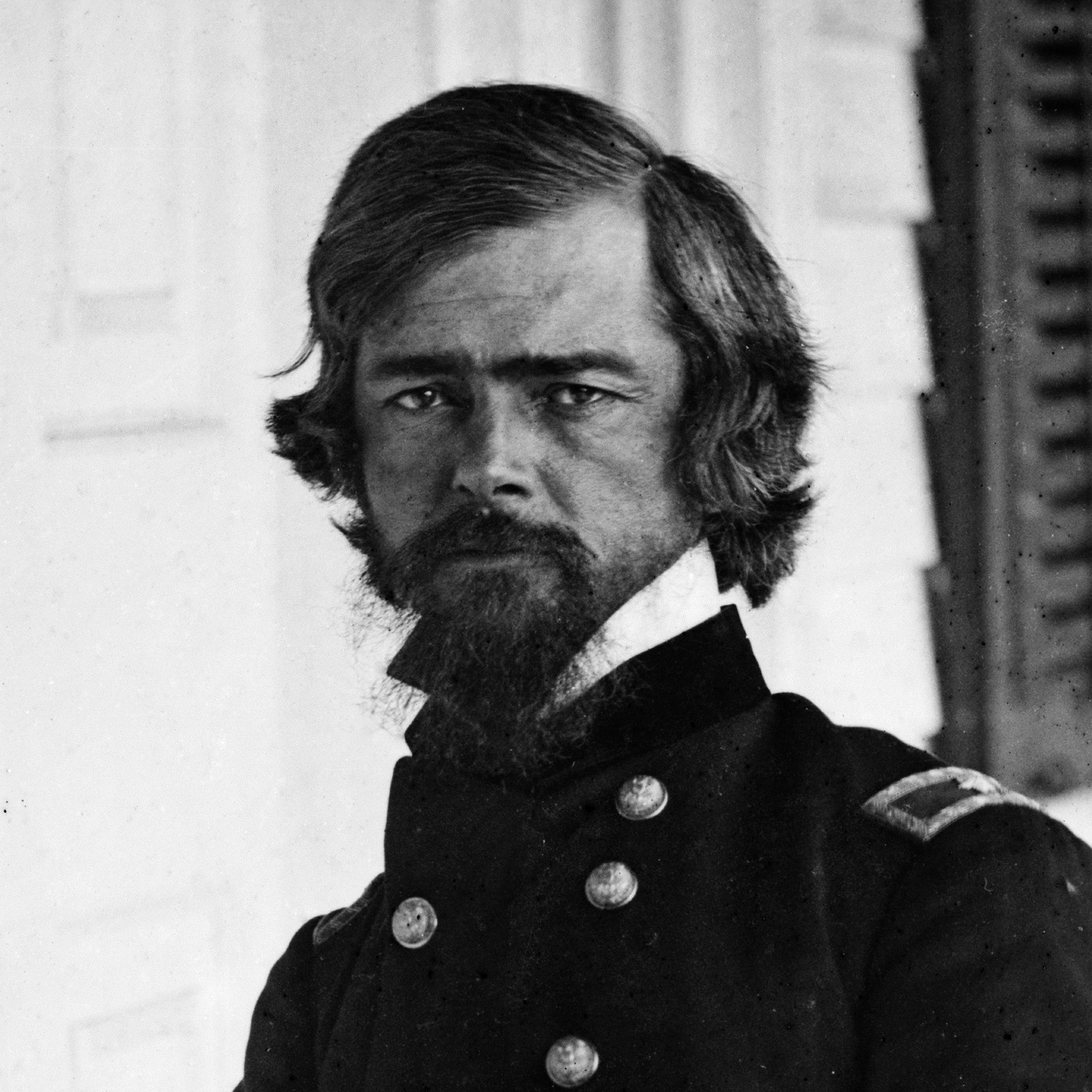
- Governor Isaac Stevens
- Territorial extent: Pierce County, Washington
- Signed by: Isaac Stevens
- Signed: April 3, 1856
- Commenced: April 3, 1856
- Repealed: May 24, 1856

On April 3, 1856, two months following the anticlimactic Battle of Seattle, Governor Stevens declared martial law in Pierce County and ordered the arrest of settlers of the Muck Creek area whom he suspected of collaborating with Yakama-allied Indians. (Note: Pierce County, politically dominated by the Whig Party, was a center of opposition to Stevens – a Democrat – and many of the settlers of the area had married into Native American families.) The proclamation read:

Whereas, in the prosecution of the Indian war, circumstances have existed affording such grave cause of' suspicion, such that certain evil disposed persons of Pierce County have given aid and comfort to the enemy, as that they have been placed under arrest and ordered to be tried by a military commission; and whereas, efforts are now being made to withdraw, by civil process, these persons from the purview of the said commission: Therefore, as the war is now being actively prosecuted throughout nearly the whole of the said county and great injury to the public, and the plans of the campaign be frustrated, if the alleged designs of these persons be not arrested, I, Isaac I. Stevens, governor of the Territory of Washington, do hereby proclaim martial law over the said county of Pierce, and do by these presents suspend for the time being, and till further notice, the functions of all civil officers in said county.

In response to the arrests, the chief justice of the Supreme Court of Washington, Francis A. Chenoweth, issued the writ of habeas corpus ordering the release of the settlers. When Stevens ignored the writ on the grounds he had suspended civil government, Edward Lander – presiding judge of the United States District Court for the Territory of Washington – summarily found Stevens guilty of contempt of court in facie curiae. (Note: Earlier in the year, Lander had accepted an officer's commission from Stevens in order to raise a militia company for the defense of Seattle. His subsequent decision to resign his commission and resume his judicial duties had caused a strain in the relationship between the two men.)

On Lander's order, United States Marshal George Corliss was dispatched to the capital city of Olympia with a force of deputy marshals to arrest Stevens. According to a 1900 account by Hazard Stevens, Stevens received the marshals and – upon being informed of their purpose – calmly challenged them, "gentlemen, why don't you execute your office"? When the marshals attempted to approach Stevens they were intercepted by Stevens' guards who physically expelled them. Stevens then ordered 150 troops of the Washington Territorial Volunteers (WTV) – an extralegal military force answerable only to him (Note: The Washington Territorial Volunteers was a militia raised by decree of the governor due to the inefficiency of the territorial legislature in authorizing sufficient military forces for the Territory. A later court ruling would find that such a force, which came to essentially operate as Stevens' personal army, had no basis in law and it was ordered disbanded.) – to immediately march on Steilacoom, Washington, site of the Pierce County Courthouse, and arrest Lander. The judge was seized from an office in which he had barricaded himself.

According to Lander's later testimony, he had contacted the United States Army at nearby Fort Steilacoom to inform them of the situation prior to the arrival of Stevens' troops but recommended no federal forces be called-out to defend the court from WTV forces, though was informed by the commanding officer that no troops would be provided for that purpose in any case.

== Siege of the Pierce County Courthouse ==
Siege of the Pierce County Courthouse
- Part of the Yakima War
- Date: May 24, 1856
- Location: Steilacoom, Washington, United States
- Caused by: Attempted arrest of Chief Justice Francis A. Chenoweth
- Result: Mutual withdrawal of federal, territorial, and county forces

Parties
Washington Territorial Volunteers	Pierce County Sheriff's Office	United States Army

Number
30	50–60	

Chenoweth, who had been ill during the drama of the preceding days, left his sick bed on Whidbey Island where he'd been recuperating and canoed to Steilacoom, announcing plans to reconvene Lander's court on 24 May. In response to this latest development, Stevens commanded the WTV to move on the courthouse and take Chenoweth into custody. Learning of the approach of a mounted troop of 30 WTV soldiers, Chenoweth ordered the sheriff of Pierce County to form the posse commitatus. Between 50 and 60 residents of the county were pressed into service by the sheriff for the defense of the court.

On the morning of 24 May, Stevens' forces arrived at the court only to find their way blocked by the sheriff's conscripts. Lt. Silas Curtis, commanding WTV troops, sent word of the development to Olympia and requested instructions. Meanwhile, a detachment of the United States Army from Fort Steilacoom arrived at the scene to observe the standoff and with the intent of intervening should violence erupt.

Late in the day on 24 May, martial law was rescinded in Pierce County by Stevens and the Washington Territorial Volunteers peacefully withdrew.

== Aftermath ==
Lander and the settlers were ultimately released. Over the matter of his imprisonment, Lander fined Stevens $50 for contempt; the fine was paid by Stevens' supporters and Stevens pardoned himself of contempt. However, he was subsequently given an official rebuke by the territorial legislature.

The following year, Stevens was elected delegate of Washington to the United States House of Representatives. In 1862, during the American Civil War, he was killed in action at the Battle of Chantilly at the head of his men and while personally carrying the fallen colors of his regiment in an open advance against Confederate States forces. He was posthumously promoted to Major General and, the following year, Stevens County, Washington was named in his honor. Lander Hall, a dormitory constructed at the University of Washington in 1957, was named for Edward Lander.

== See also ==
- Ex parte Merryman
- Washington State Guard
