= Francis A. Chenoweth =

American judge

- Chenoweth as Speaker of the Oregon House

5th Speaker of the Oregon House of Representatives
- In office 1866–1866
- Preceded by: Isaac R. Moores, Jr.
- Succeeded by: John Whiteaker

Speaker of the Washington House of Representatives
- In office 1854–1854

Associate Justice of the Washington Supreme Court
- In office 1854–1858
- Appointed by: Franklin Pierce
- Preceded by: Victor Munroe

Personal details
- Born: May 24, 1819 Franklin County, Ohio, U.S.
- Died: November 29, 1899 (aged 80) Kings Valley, Oregon, U.S.
- Spouse(s): Hannah Logan; Elizabeth Findley

Francis A. Chenoweth (May 24, 1819 – November 29, 1899) was an American lawyer and politician in the Pacific Northwest. A native of Ohio, he lived in Iowa and Wisconsin before immigrating to the Oregon Territory. There he served in the legislature of the Oregon Territory and then the Washington Territory, including serving as Speaker of the Washington House of Representatives. A Democrat, he then served on the Washington Supreme Court before returning to Oregon where he was elected to the Oregon House of Representatives and was selected as Speaker of the body for one session.

== Early life ==
Francis Chenoweth was born in Clark County, Ohio, on May 24, 1819, to Rachel Morgan and Thomas C. Chenowith. He moved to Grant County, Wisconsin, where in 1842 to the age of 22 passed the Wisconsin bar. That year he also married Maud S. Hannah Logan of Iowa, and had two children while living in both Iowa and Wisconsin.

In 1849, he moved to the Oregon Territory and the next year settled on the north side of the Columbia River. Before moving he married Elizabeth Ann Findley in Oregon City on March 27, 1850, and they had eight children. Chenoweth and family settled at the new community of Cascade, located at the lower set of rapids on the river. There he operated a business portaging cargo and passengers around the set of rapids. This consisted of a mule powered train pulling cars over a two to four mile (6 km) track. Opened in 1851, it was the first railroad in what is now the state of Washington.

== Political career ==
In 1852, Chenoweth was elected as a Democrat to the Oregon Territorial Legislature representing Clark and Lewis counties. Both counties were north of the Columbia, and while in office from late 1852 to early 1853 he advocated to create a new territory on that side of the river. On March 2, 1853, Washington Territory was created out of the northern and eastern portions of Oregon Territory, eliminating those counties. The following year Chenoweth was elected to the Washington House of Representatives, again representing Clark County. That session he served as the Speaker of the House.

In Spring 1854, he was appointed by United States President Franklin Pierce to Washington Territory's Supreme Court to replace Victor Munroe. Chenoweth served as judge on the high court until 1858. He moved north to Island County after leaving the court and in 1859 was again elected to the House.

In 1863, Chenoweth returned south to what was then the state of Oregon, settling in the Willamette Valley at Corvallis in Benton County. He helped to incorporate the Oregon Central Railroad in 1865 as a shareholder. Now a Republican, he was elected to the Oregon House in 1866 representing Benton County. That session he also served as Speaker of the House. Chenoweth served as the district attorney of Oregon's second judicial district (Benton County) in 1872.

== Later life and family ==
Chenoweth continued to practice law in Corvallis and live there until the 1880s. He helped organize and later served as the president of the Corvallis & Yaquina Bay Railroad. By 1885, he moved to the Kings Valley part of Benton County. His children were Ella, Lloyd, Elizabeth, William Preston, Lindus, Ross Francis, Heber, Somerville Samuel, Mary Theresa, and Robert Ulysses S. Grant Chenoweth. Francis A. Chenoweth fell ill in the summer of 1899 and died on November 29, 1899, at the age of 80 in Kings Valley and was buried at Kings Valley Cemetery.

== See also ==
- Martial law in Pierce County
