= Germanton =

Germanton may refer to:

- Germanton, North Carolina, United States
- the former name of Holbrook, New South Wales, Australia

== See also ==
- Germantown
- Jermantown
