= Battle of Chantilly =

Battle of the American Civil War

Battle of Chantilly (Battle of Ox Hill)
- Part of the American Civil War
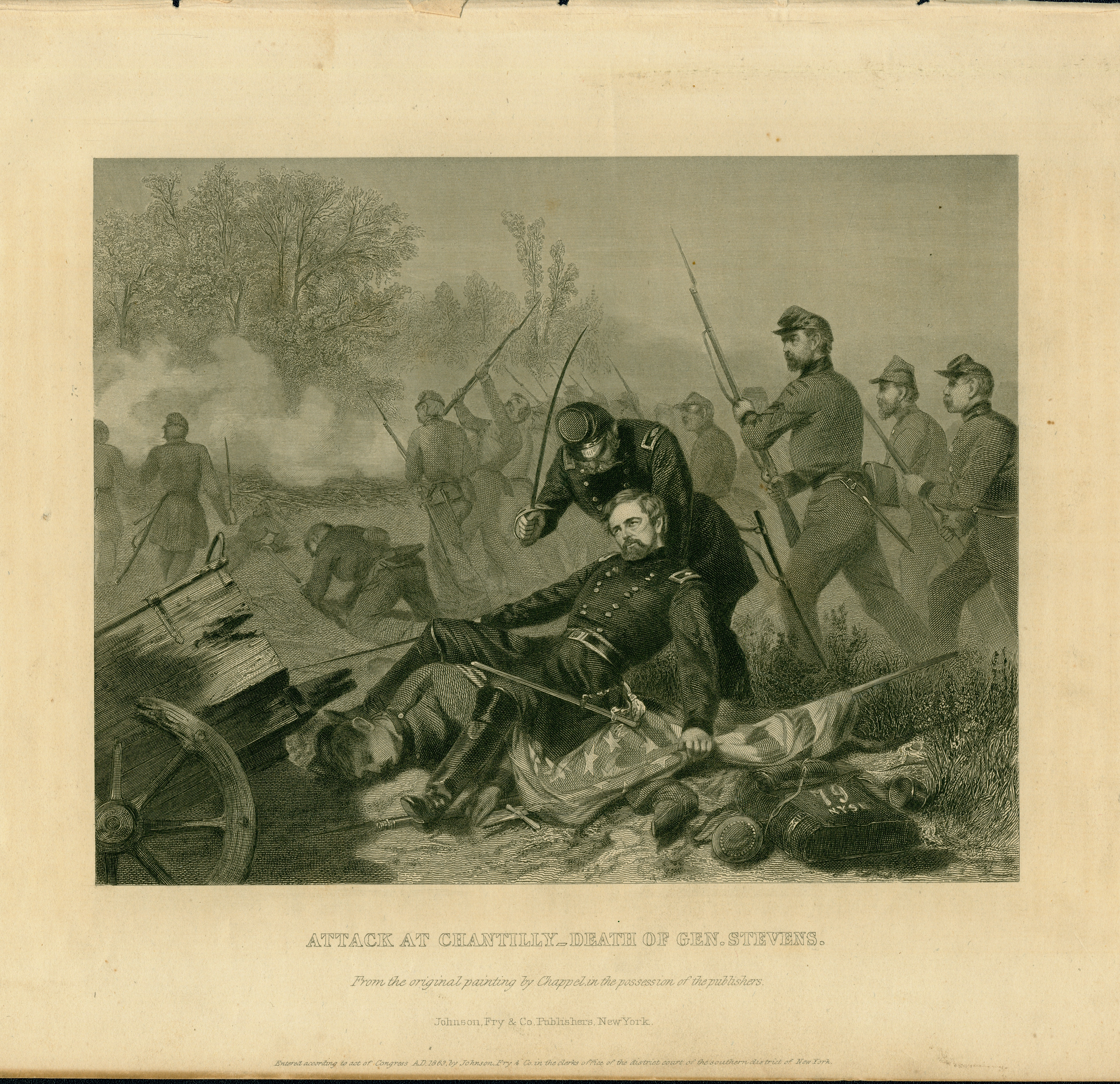
- Death of General Isaac Stevens
Date	September 1, 1862
Location	Fairfax County, Virginia, U.S. 38°51′54″N 77°22′12″W
Result	Confederate victory

Belligerents
United States (Union)	CSA (Confederacy)

Commanders and leaders
Philip Kearny †; Isaac Stevens †	Stonewall Jackson; J.E.B. Stuart

Units involved
Army of Virginia: III Corps; IX Corps	Army of Northern Virginia: Second Corps

Strength
6,000	20,000

Casualties and losses
1,300	800

The Battle of Chantilly (or Ox Hill, the Confederate name) happened on September 1, 1862, in Fairfax County, Virginia, as the concluding battle of the Northern Virginia Campaign of the American Civil War. Stonewall Jackson's corps of the Army of Northern Virginia attempted to cut off the line of retreat of the Union Army of Virginia following the Second Battle of Bull Run, but was attacked by two Union divisions. During the ensuing battle, Union division commanders Isaac Stevens and Philip Kearny were both killed, but the Union attack halted Jackson's advance.

== Background ==
Defeated in the Second Battle of Bull Run on August 30, Union Maj. Gen. John Pope ordered his Army of Virginia to retreat to Centreville. The movement began after dark, with Maj. Gen. Irvin McDowell's III Corps providing cover. The army crossed Bull Run and the last troops across, Maj. Gen. Franz Sigel's I Corps, destroyed Stone Bridge behind them. Gen. Robert E. Lee decided not to press the advantage gained that day, largely because he knew his Army of Northern Virginia was exhausted from two weeks of nearly constant marching and nearly three days of battle, so the Union retreat went unmolested. Lee's decision also allowed the Army of Virginia's II Corps, under Maj. Gen. Nathaniel P. Banks, to consolidate with the bulk of Pope's army, marching in from Bristoe Station, where they had been guarding the army's trains. More importantly, Lee's decision bought time for the Union to push to the front the Army of the Potomac's II, V, and VI Corps, which had been brought from the Peninsula and—much to Maj. Gen. George B. McClellan's dismay—placed under Pope's command.

By the morning of August 31, Pope began to lose his grasp on command of his army. The defeat at Second Bull Run seemed to have shattered his nerve and Pope was unsure what to do next; he knew Washington wanted an attack, but he feared Lee might strike first and destroy his reforming force before it was ready to fight again. Calling a conference of his corps commanders—something he had been loath to do previously in the Virginia Campaign—in his Centreville headquarters, Pope agreed with their decision to retreat further into the Washington defenses. But a message from General-in-Chief Henry W. Halleck directed him to attack and he ordered an advance on Lee's forces on the Manassas field.

Lee, however, had already set in motion his own plan that would rob Pope of the initiative to attack. Lee directed Maj. Gen. Stonewall Jackson to march his troops around Pope's right flank to get behind the Union position at Centreville. Leading the way and scouting for any Union blocking force was Confederate cavalry under the command of Maj. Gen. J. E. B. Stuart. Maj. Gen. James Longstreet's command would remain in place for the day to deceive Pope into believing that Lee's entire force remained in his front, while Jackson's command would make its flanking march north and then east to take strategically important Germantown, Virginia, where Pope's only two routes to Washington—the Warrenton Pike (modern U.S. Route 29) and the Little River Turnpike (modern U.S. Route 50)—converged. Jackson's men, hungry and worn, moved slowly and bivouacked for the night at Pleasant Valley, three miles northeast of Centreville. As Pope settled down for the night on August 31, he was unaware that Jackson was on the verge of turning his flank.

During the night two events occurred that forced Pope to change his mind. A staff officer arrived from the Germantown position to report that a heavy force of cavalry had shelled the intersection before retreating. Pope initially dismissed the cavalry as little more than a patrol. But when, hours later, two Union cavalrymen reported seeing a large mass of infantry marching east down the Little River Turnpike, Pope realized that his army was in danger. He countermanded actions preparing for an attack and directed the army to retreat from Centreville to Washington; he also sent out a series of infantry probes up the roads that Lee might use to reach his troops as they pulled back.

== Battle ==
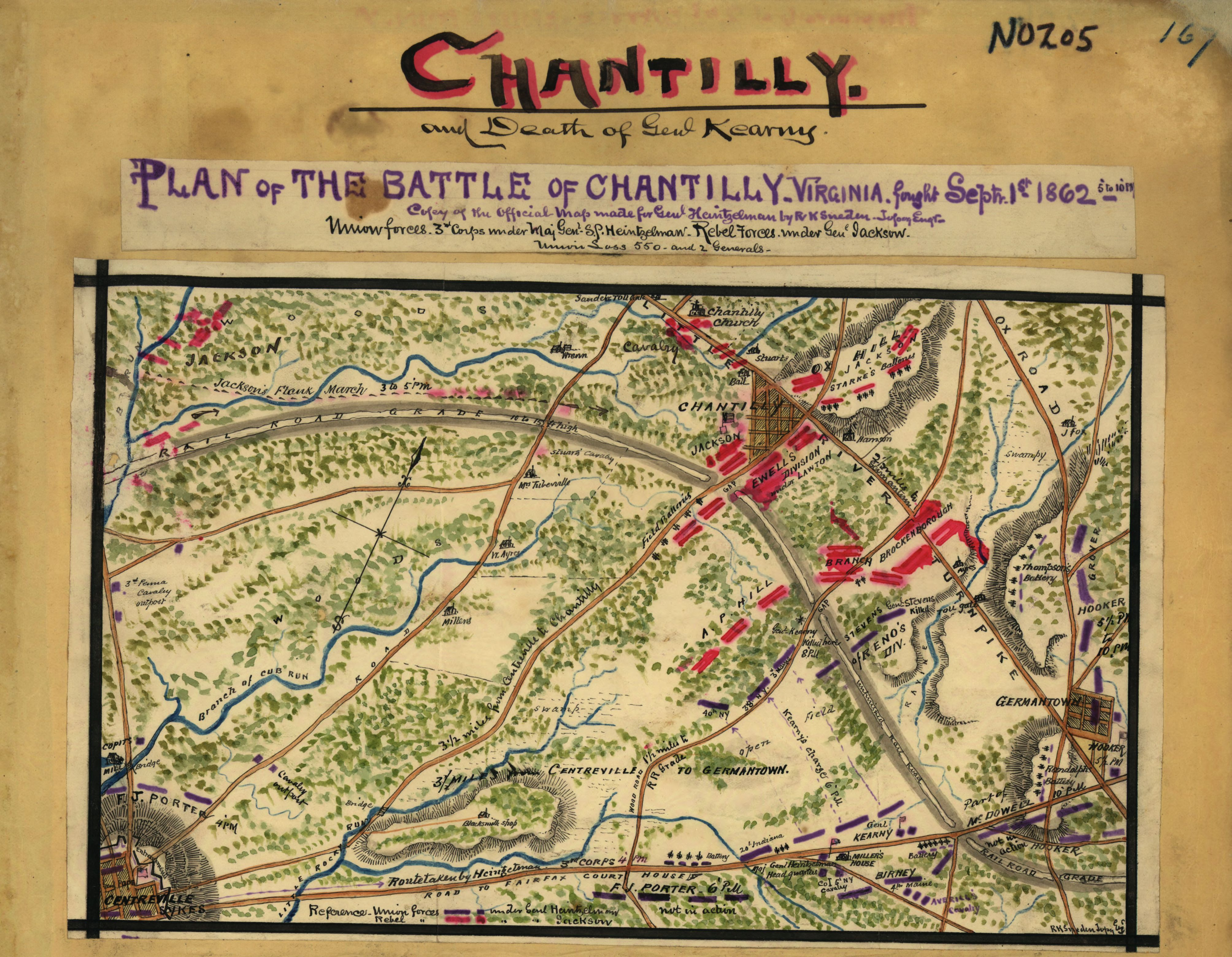
Map of the battle

On the morning of September 1, Pope ordered Maj. Gen. Edwin V. Sumner of the II Corps, Army of the Potomac, to send a brigade north to reconnoiter; the army's cavalry was too exhausted for the mission. But at the same time, he continued his movement in the direction of Washington, sending McDowell's corps to Germantown (on the western border of modern-day Fairfax, Virginia), where it could protect the important intersection of Warrenton Pike and Little River Turnpike that the army needed for the retreat. He also sent two brigades from Maj. Gen. Jesse L. Reno's IX Corps, under the command of Brig. Gen. Isaac Stevens, to block Jackson. Maj. Gen. Philip Kearny's division from the Army of the Potomac's III Corps of Heintzelman followed later that afternoon.

Jackson resumed his march to the south, but his troops were tired and hungry and made poor progress as the rain continued. They marched only three miles and occupied Ox Hill, southeast of Chantilly Plantation, and halted, while Jackson himself took a nap. All during the morning, Confederate cavalry skirmished with Union infantry and cavalry. At about 3 p.m., Stevens' division arrived at Ox Hill. Despite being outnumbered, Stevens chose to attack across a grassy field against Brig. Gen. Alexander Lawton's division in the Confederate center. The Union attack was initially successful, routing the brigade of Colonel Henry Strong and driving in the flank of Captain William Brown, with Brown killed during the fighting. The Union division was driven back following a counterattack by Brig. Gen. Jubal Early's brigade. Stevens was killed during this attack at about 5 p.m., by a shot through his temple.

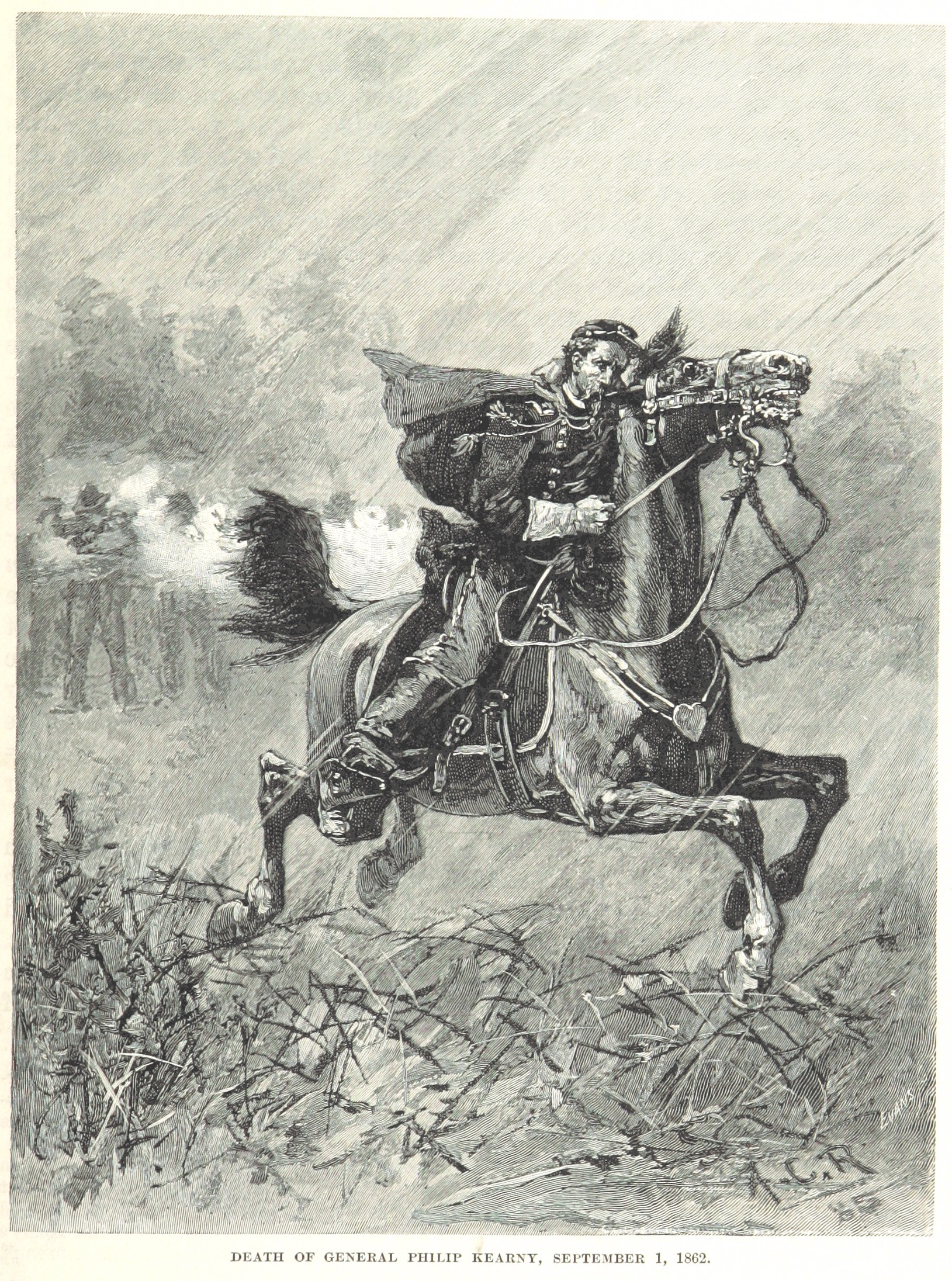
The death of General Kearny

A severe thunderstorm erupted about this time, resulting in limited visibility and an increased dependence on the bayonet, as the rain soaked the ammunition of the infantry and made it useless. Kearny arrived about this time with his division to find Stevens' units disorganized. Perceiving a gap in the line he deployed Brig. Gen. David B. Birney's brigade on Stevens's left, ordering it to attack across the field. Birney managed to maneuver close to the Confederate line but his attack stalled in hand-to-hand combat with Maj. Gen. A.P. Hill's division. Kearny mistakenly rode into the Confederate lines during the battle and was killed. As Kearny's other two brigades arrived on the field, Birney used the reinforcements as a rear guard as he withdrew the remainder of the Union force to the southern side of the farm fields, ending the battle.

== Aftermath ==
That night, Longstreet arrived to relieve Jackson's troops and to renew the battle in the morning. The lines were so close that some soldiers accidentally stumbled into the camps of the opposing army. The Union army withdrew to Germantown and Fairfax Court House that night, followed over the next few days by retreating to the defenses of Washington. The Confederate cavalry attempted a pursuit but failed to cause significant damage to the Union army.

The fighting was tactically inconclusive. Although Jackson's turning movement was foiled and he was unable to block the Union retreat or destroy Pope's army, National Park Service historians count Chantilly as a strategic Confederate victory because it neutralized any threat from Pope's army and cleared the way for Lee to begin his Maryland Campaign. The Confederates claimed a tactical victory as well because they held the field after the battle. Two Union generals were killed, while one Confederate brigade commander was killed. Pope, recognizing the attack as an indication of continued danger to his army, continued his retreat to the fortifications around Washington, D.C. Lee began the Maryland Campaign, which culminated in the Battle of Antietam, after Pope retreated from Virginia. The Army of the Potomac, under Maj. Gen. George B. McClellan, absorbed the forces of Pope's Army of Virginia, which was disbanded as a separate army.

== Battlefield today ==
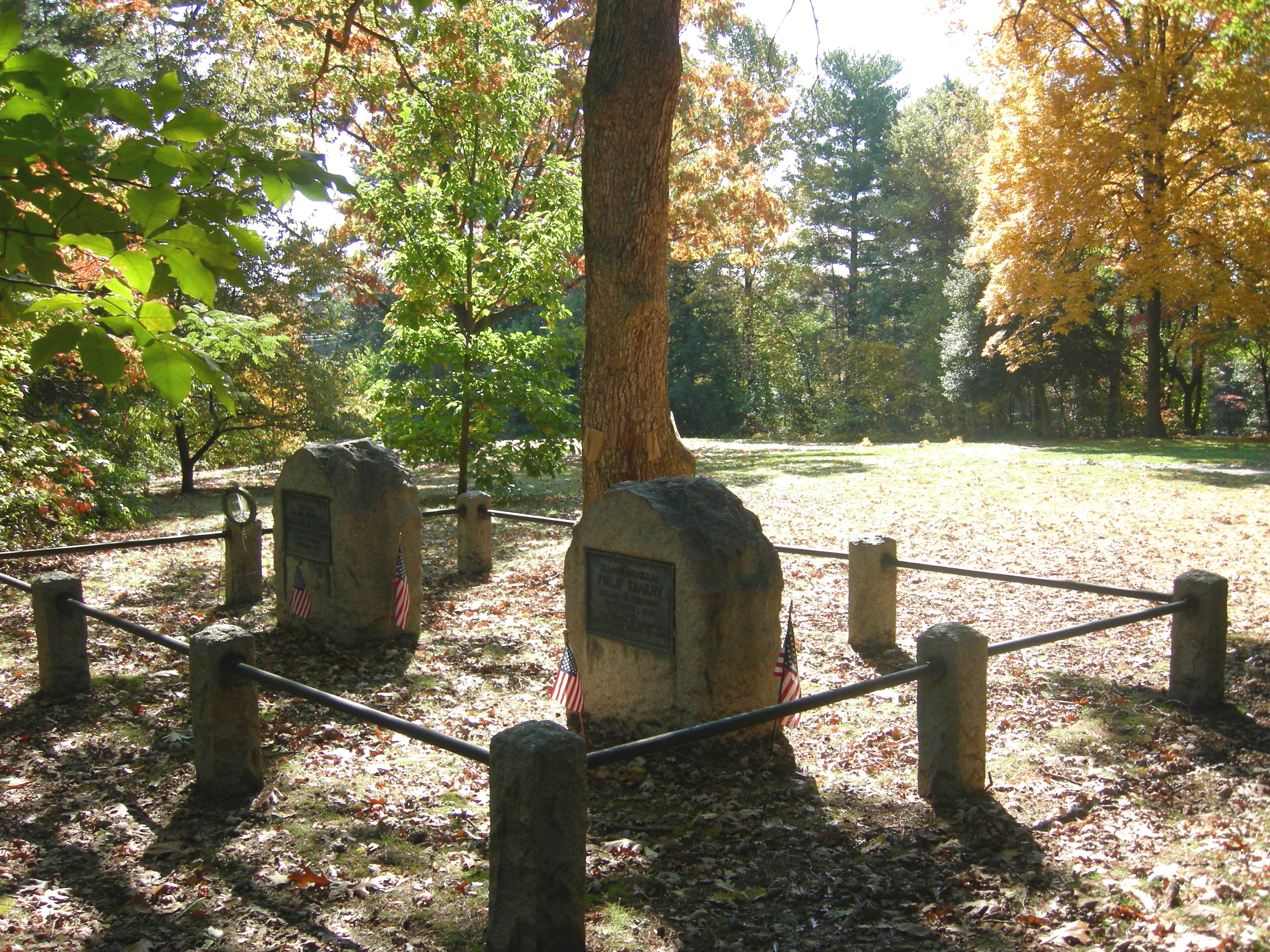
Ox Hill Battlefield Park, with monuments to Stevens and Kearny

The site of the battle, once rural farmland, is now surrounded by suburban development in Fairfax County, Virginia. The modern thoroughfares of U.S. Route 50 (Lee–Jackson Memorial Highway) and State Route 286 (Fairfax County Parkway), as well as State Route 608 (West Ox Road) intersect near the site of the battle. A 4.8-acre (1.9 ha) memorial park, the Ox Hill Battlefield Park, is located off of West Ox Road and lies adjacent to the Fairfax Towne Center shopping area, and includes most of the Gen. Isaac Stevens portion of the battle, about 1.5% of the total ground. The park is under the jurisdiction of the Fairfax County Park Authority; in January 2005, the authority approved a General Management Plan and Conceptual Development Plan that sets forth a detailed history and future management framework for the site.

A small yard within the nearby Fairfax Towne Center has been preserved to mark the area crossed by Confederate troops to get to the Ox Hill battlefield.
