= Ox Hill Battlefield Park =

Park in Fairfax, Virginia, United States

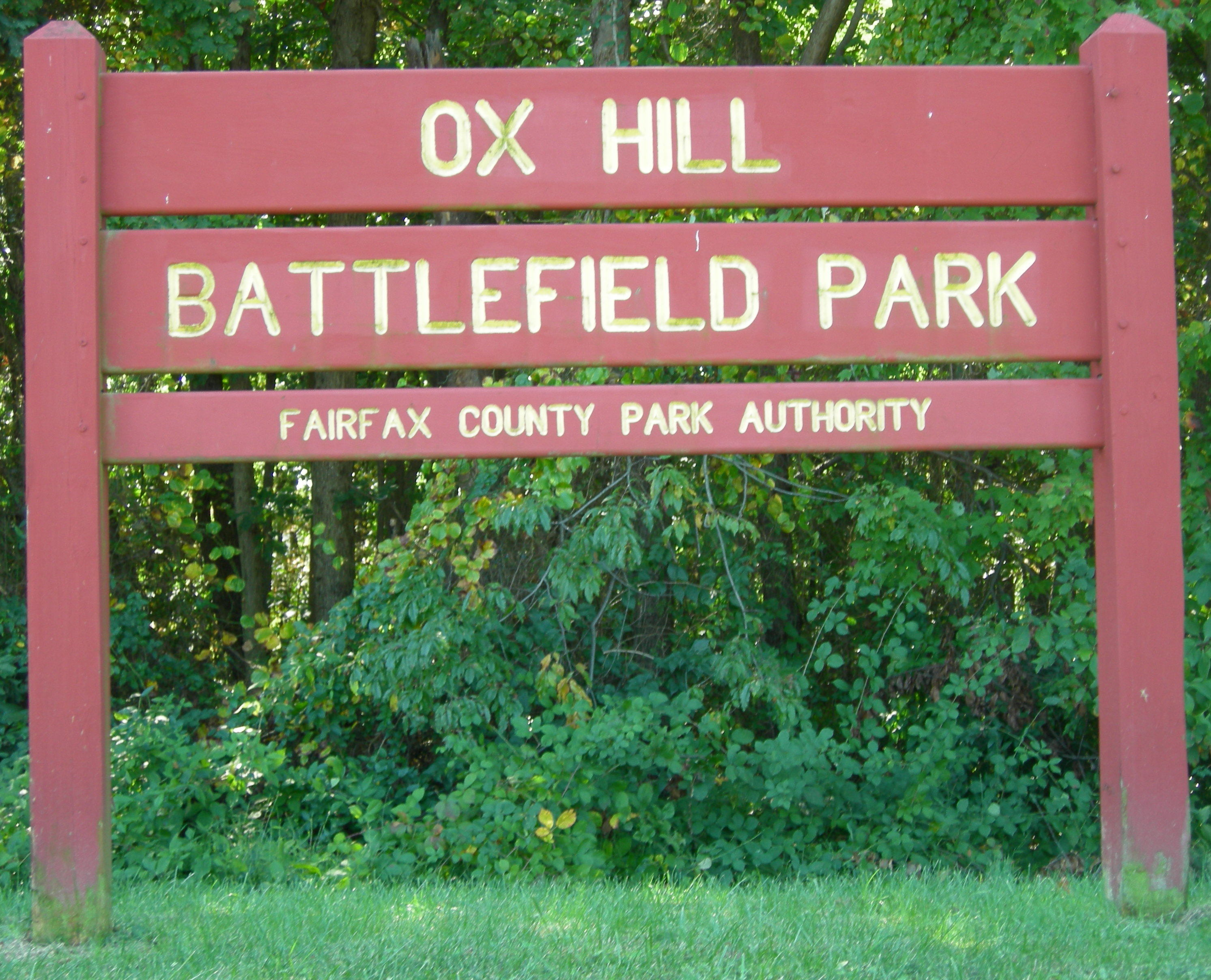
- Interactive map of Ox Hill Battlefield Park
- Location: Fairfax, Fairfax County, Virginia, USA
- Coordinates: 38°51′52″N 77°22′10″W
- Area: 4.8 acres (0.019 km^{2})
- Operator: Fairfax County Park Authority
- Status: Open all year
- Website: Official site

Ox Hill Battlefield Park is a site in Fairfax, Virginia, where the Battle of Ox Hill (Union name Battle of Chantilly) was fought during the American Civil War. It was the only major battle of the war fought in Fairfax County. The battlefield is now a public park adjacent to suburban developments and the Fairfax Towne Center shopping center, and is maintained by the Fairfax County Park Authority.

The most prominent feature is a pair of monuments to the two Union generals killed during the battle, Isaac Stevens and Philip Kearny. Stevens was fatally shot within the area of the present-day park while Kearny was killed just to the west. There are also two Virginia historical markers placed near the park entrance commemorating the battle and its aftermath.

The park is located at 4134 West Ox Road, in Fair Lakes near Route 50, on the corner of West Ox Road (State Route 608) and Monument Drive (which was presumably named for the Kearny and Stevens memorial). It is only 4.8 acres (0.019 km^{2}), about 1.5% of the roughly 300 acres (1.2 km^{2}) where the battle was fought. The rest of the battlefield has been developed with apartments, office buildings, and similar urban construction. Nevertheless, the remaining plot does hold important portions of the battle area.

== Battle ==
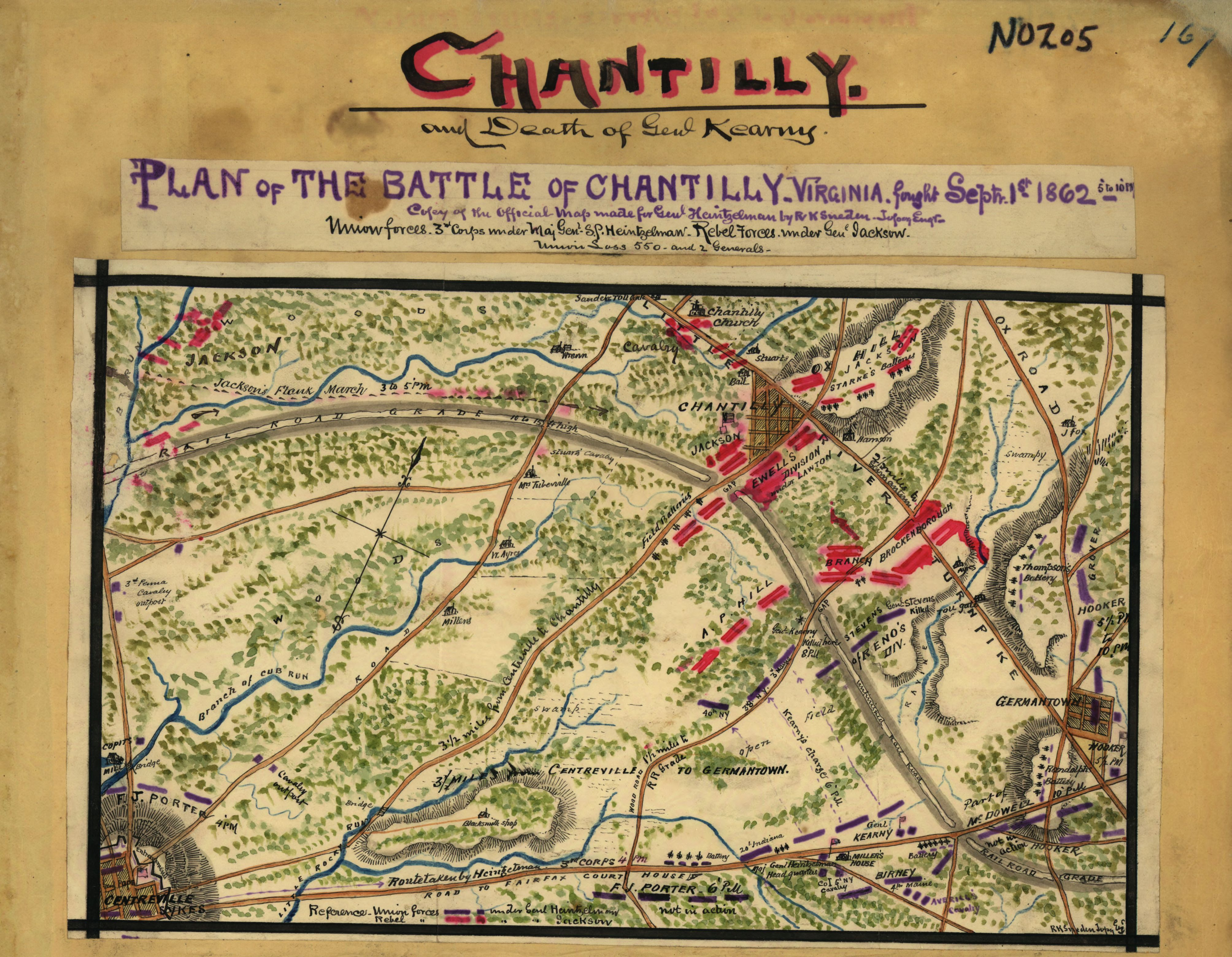
Map of the battle

After being defeated at the Battle of Second Manassas (called Second Battle of Bull Run by the Union), the Federal army retreated to positions near Centreville, Virginia. Confederate general Robert E. Lee, in an attempt to surround the Union army and block its retreat towards Washington, D.C., sent 20,000 men under Stonewall Jackson north and then east along the Little River Turnpike (today part of Route 50) to get behind the Union position. Union General John Pope learned of this action, and sent about 6,000 men to intercept.

The two sides came into contact during the afternoon of September 1, 1862. The Confederate forces were on Ox Hill, alongside the Little River Turnpike, and the Union forces came from the south. A severe thunderstorm raged as each side attacked and counterattacked, and Union generals Stevens and Kearny were killed during the fighting. During a charge by the 79th New York Highlanders, later called the Cameron Highlanders, against Confederates massed in the woods, Stevens picked up the regiment's fallen colors and shouted, "Highlanders, my Highlanders, follow your general!" Within seconds, a Confederate bullet struck his head and he died instantly. After receiving a message from Gen. David B. Birney that there was a gap in the Union line, Kearny rode through a cornfield to reconnoiter. This brought him face to face with a line of Rebels, who shouted, "That's a Yankee officer! Shoot him!" Kearny ignored an order to halt, and a musket volley from the 49th Georgia regiment brought him down. By nightfall, neither side had broken through, and both fell back. The Union suffered approximately 1,300 casualties, with the Confederacy losing about 800.

The bulk of the Union army was able to retreat further east towards Washington, ending Lee's attempt to fully defeat the Union army and thus protecting the capital from attack, but it came at a cost of many casualties and two important generals lost. Lee instead turned to Maryland, and fought the Battle of Antietam sixteen days later.

== History of the park ==
John N. Ballard, a Confederate cavalryman during the Civil War who lost a leg serving under John S. Mosby, ended up owning much of the Ox Hill battlefield in the 1870s after marrying the heiress (Mary Reid Thrift). On July 7, 1915, Ballard and his wife deeded a small plot near the site of Stevens' death for the purpose of "allowing any person or persons the privilege of erecting appropriate monuments or markers commemorating the death of any Confederate or Federal Soldier who fell in the battle fought on the Fruit Vale Farm, this battle was fought on the 1st day of September 1862, being known as the Battle of Ox Hill or Chantilly." The plot was deeded to six trustees; three from New Jersey (Kearny's home) and three from Virginia. Trustees have since been appointed by court order. The monuments to Stevens and Kearny were dedicated on October 2, 1915, by the First New Jersey Brigade Society.

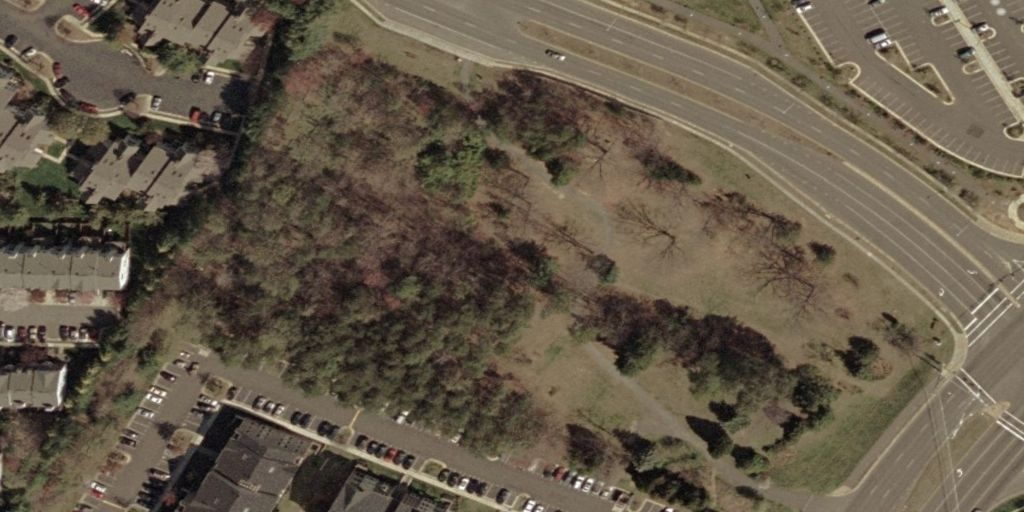
Satellite view of the park

In the 1980s, the area of the battlefield began to be commercially developed. The company which acquired rights to the park area wanted to move the monuments to a new location, but following opposition to this plan (including articles in The Washington Post), in 1987 the developer agreed to leave the stones in place and donated 2.4 acres (9,700 m^{2}) surrounding the monuments to Fairfax County. In 1994, the county purchased an additional 2.4 acres (9,700 m^{2}). The rest of the battlefield is now completely developed.

Signs designating the Ox Hill Battlefield Park were placed on the site, but little else was done with the park for many years. In 2004, the Fairfax County Park Authority developed plans to improve the park, including restoration of some elements of the Civil War battlefield, two new monuments to Confederate and Union soldiers, and additional signage. These plans were approved in January 2005, to be implemented in stages as funding became available.

The Fairfax County Park Authority dedicated a newly restored park on September 1, 2008, the 146th anniversary of the Confederate victory. The new park comes with a wheelchair-ready trail, interpretive exhibits, and three hexagonal information kiosks. The visitor may step into a portion of the original cornfield, within two reconstructed split-rail fences that follow the actual fence lines of the fields. The cornfield will be planted with grasses that give the impression of corn, as the County deemed the latter too labor-intensive to maintain.

== Events ==
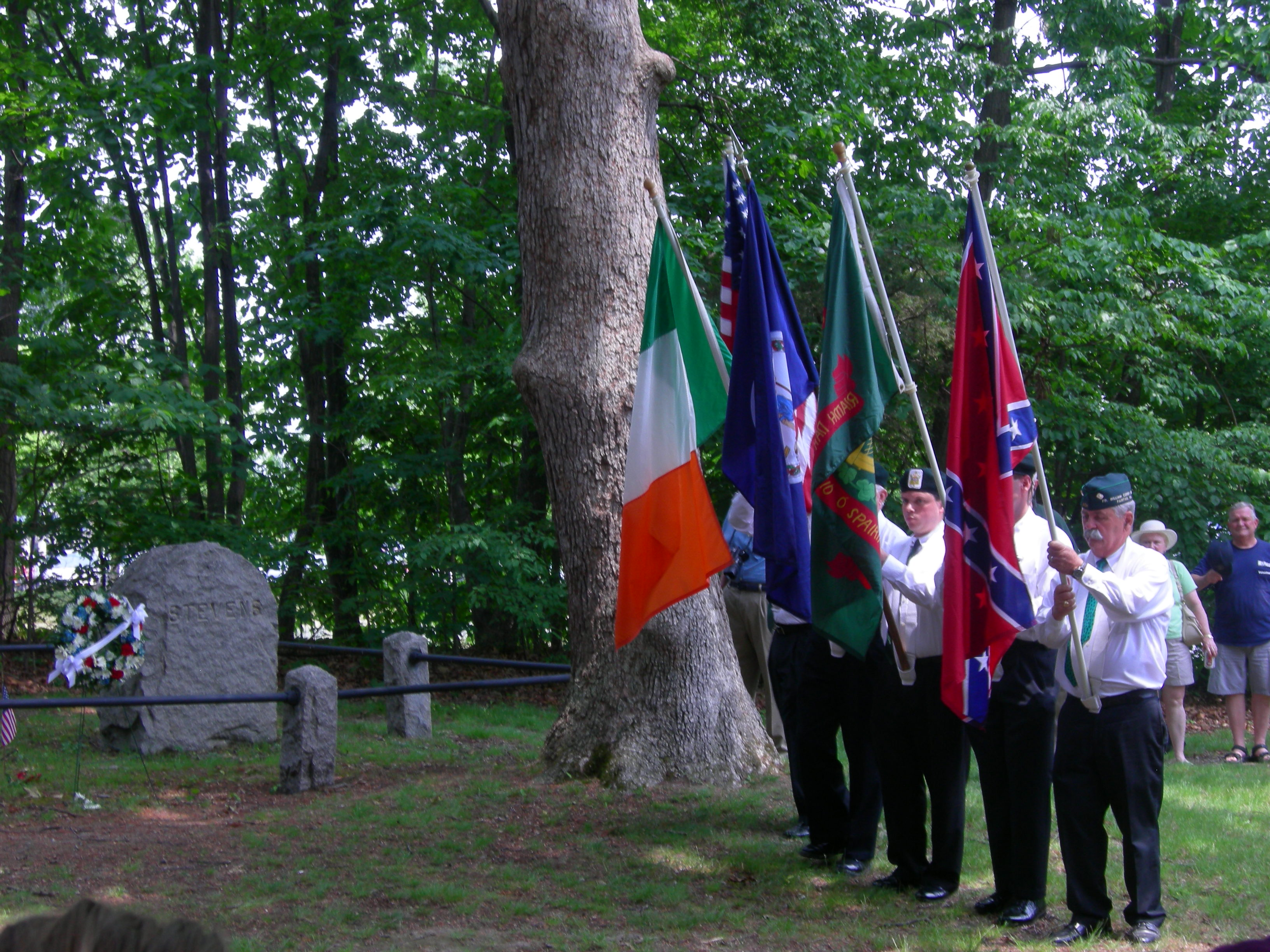
Color guard during Memorial Day ceremony in 2007

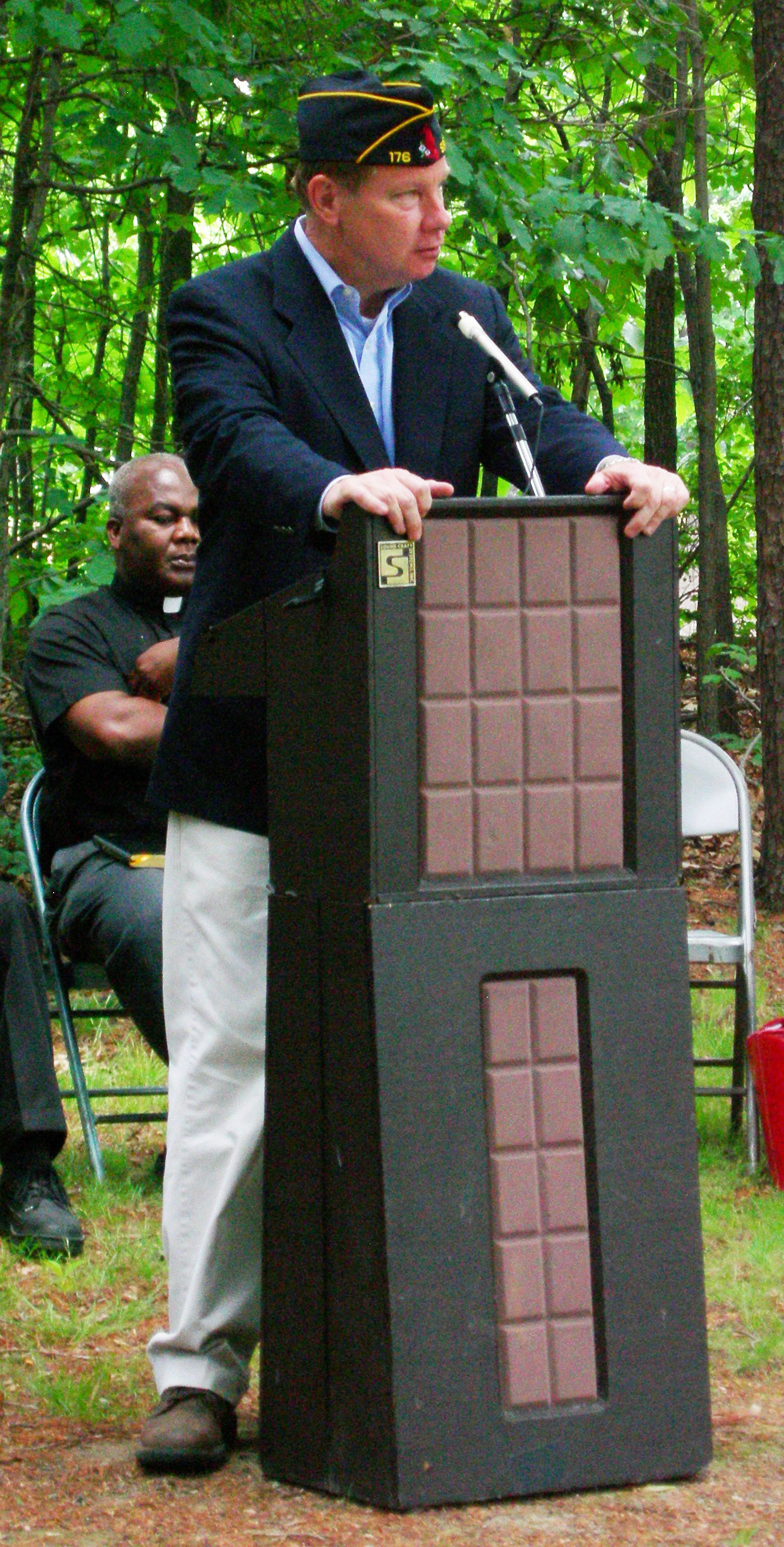
Rep. Tom Davis speaking in 2007

Two or three times a year, groups gather for memorial, commemorative, or historic reenactment special events held at the park. These are typically held on or near significant dates, usually Memorial Day, September 1 (the anniversary of the battle), and Veterans Day.

On Memorial Day, usually at 1 pm, the Ancient Order of Hibernians sponsors a wreath laying ceremony, which includes a color guard performed by Civil War re-enactors.

For several years, the 28th Massachusetts Volunteer Infantry, Company B, held a commemoration on a weekend near September 1 which included living history presentations by Civil War re-enactors local historians, demonstrations of infantry and medical activities with military and musket firing, displays of tents and gear, and cooking by the soldiers.

== Features ==
=== Kearny and Stevens memorial ===
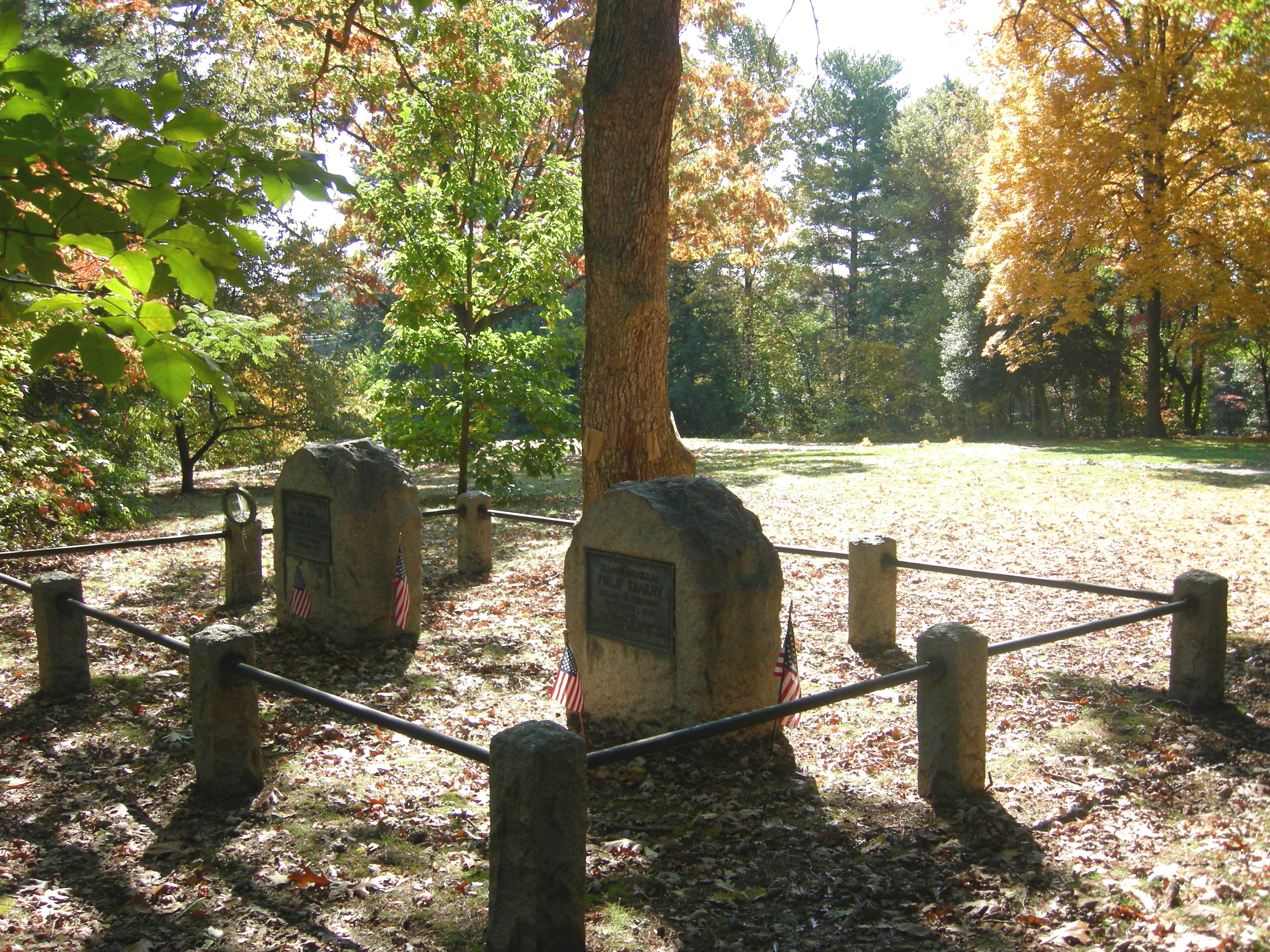
Kearny (right) and Stevens monuments at the park

The memorial to Generals Kearny and Stevens are two granite monuments, surrounded by an iron rail with granite posts. Each monument has the general's name carved on one side, and a tributary plaque attached to the other. The monuments are not gravestones but are cenotaphs, as the two generals are buried elsewhere. Neither general died on the exact spot; Stevens was killed nearby and Kearny died about 150 yards (140 m) southwest of the park. The plot of land containing the memorial is not officially part of the park as it is still owned by its trustees, but the park almost certainly would not exist today without them. The plaques read:

Stevens	Kearny
Here Fell; Major General; Isaac Ingalls Stevens; With the Flag of the Republic; In His Dying Grasp; September 1, 1862	Major General; Philip Kearny; Killed on this spot September 1, 1862; The tributes of Kearny's; First New Jersey Brigade and friends

Note: Stevens was a brigadier general at the time of his death; he was posthumously promoted to major general.

=== Stone markers ===
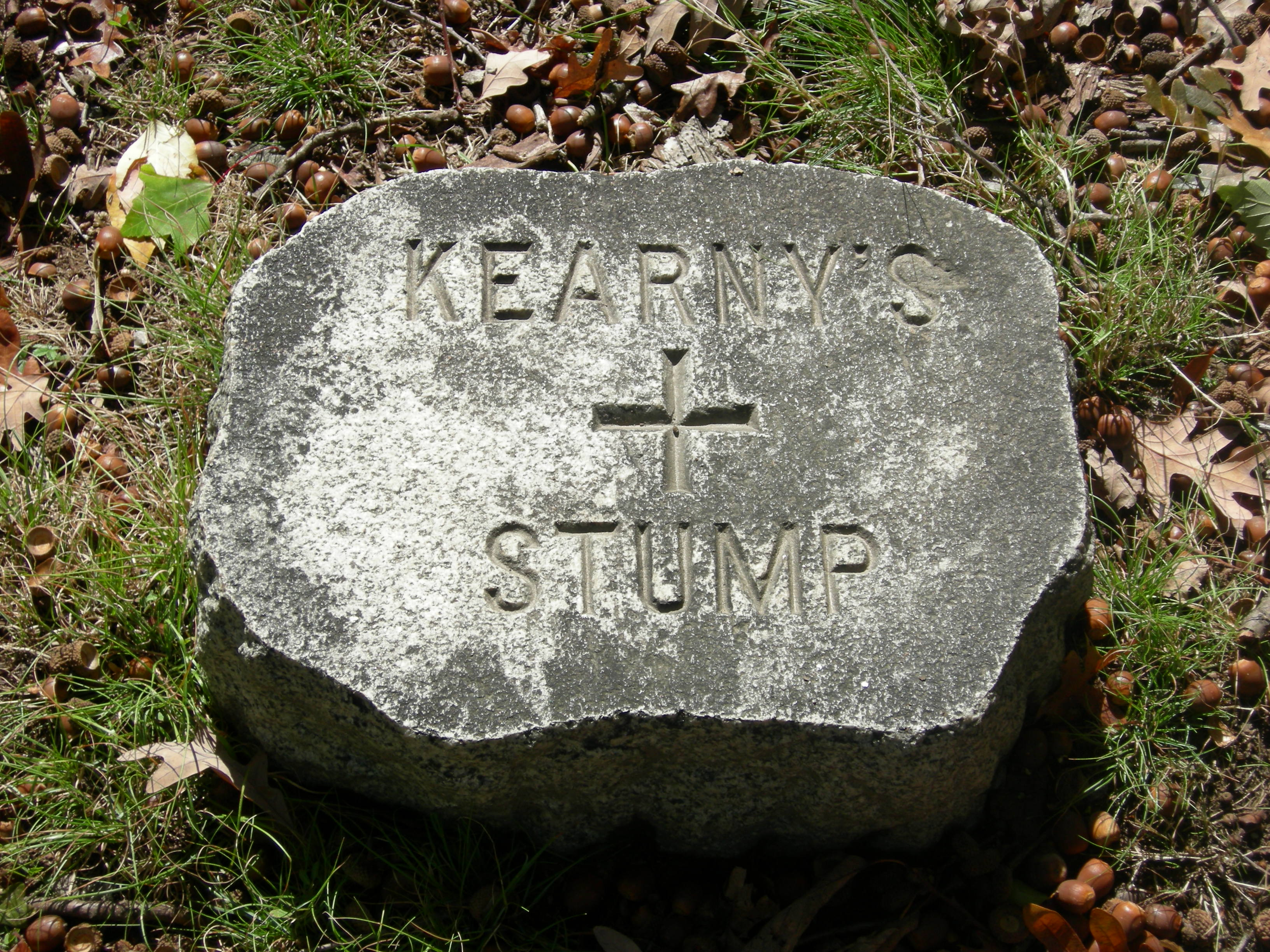
Kearny's Stump

Kearny's Stump is a granite marker in the shape of a tree stump, located a few feet away from the memorial. The original tree stump was purported to be the spot where Kearny was killed, though he is now known to have died in a cornfield about 150 yards (140 m) away (outside the bounds of the current-day park). The stump was however used as the origin of the survey used to define the memorial plot, so when the original stump rotted away it was replaced with a stone version.

There is also a pile of fieldstone rocks and a quartzite boulder on the park grounds, which is believed to mark the location where General Stevens was killed.

As of September 2008, Fairfax County Park Authority plans call for a fundraising drive to erect two large granite monuments to honor the contribution of the common soldier because only the two slain Union officers are recognized and no attention is given to the Confederate troops who fought and died there. The Union monument will carry the name of Chantilly and the Confederate one Ox Hill.

=== Signage ===
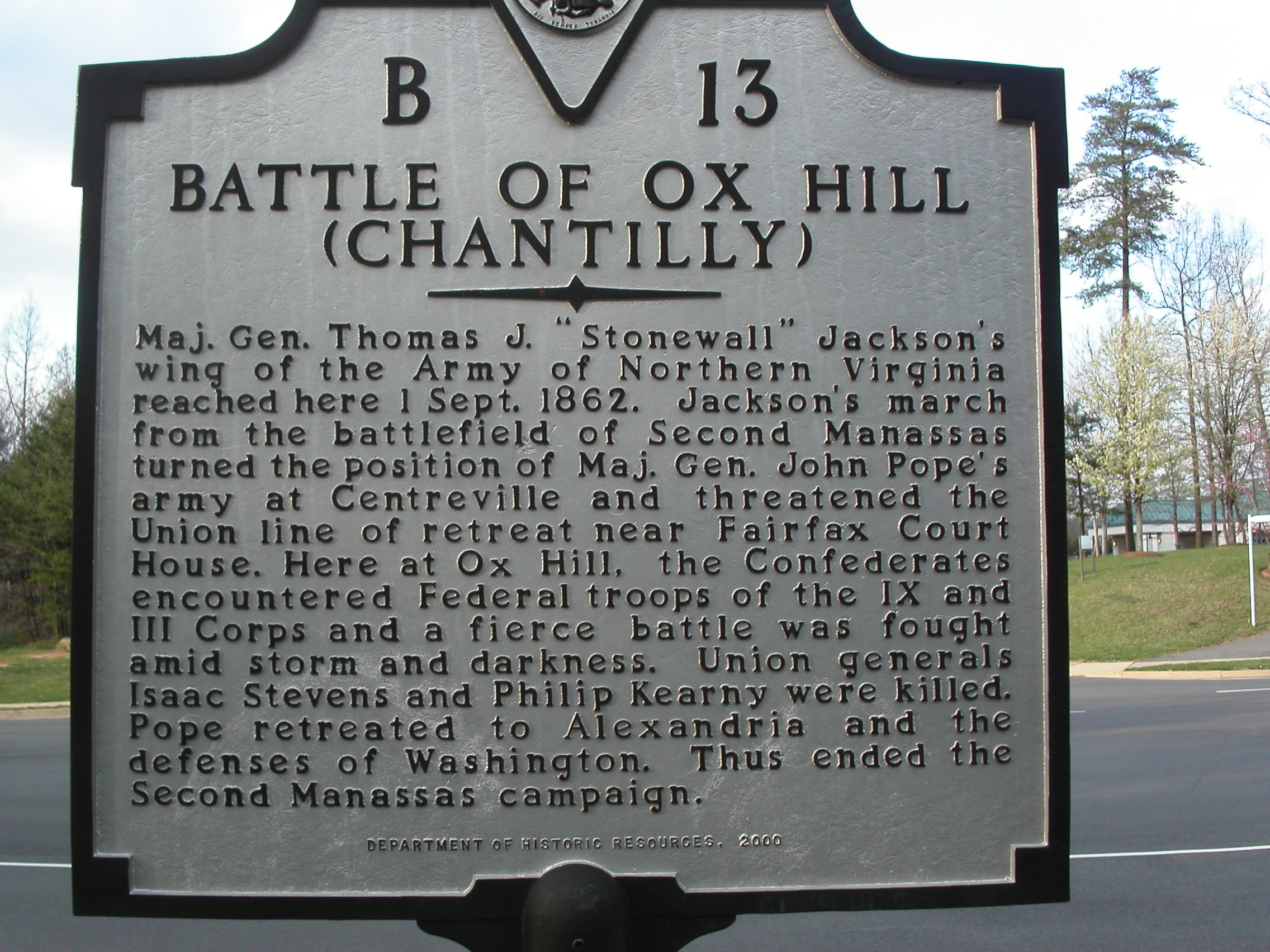
Ox Hill Historic Marker

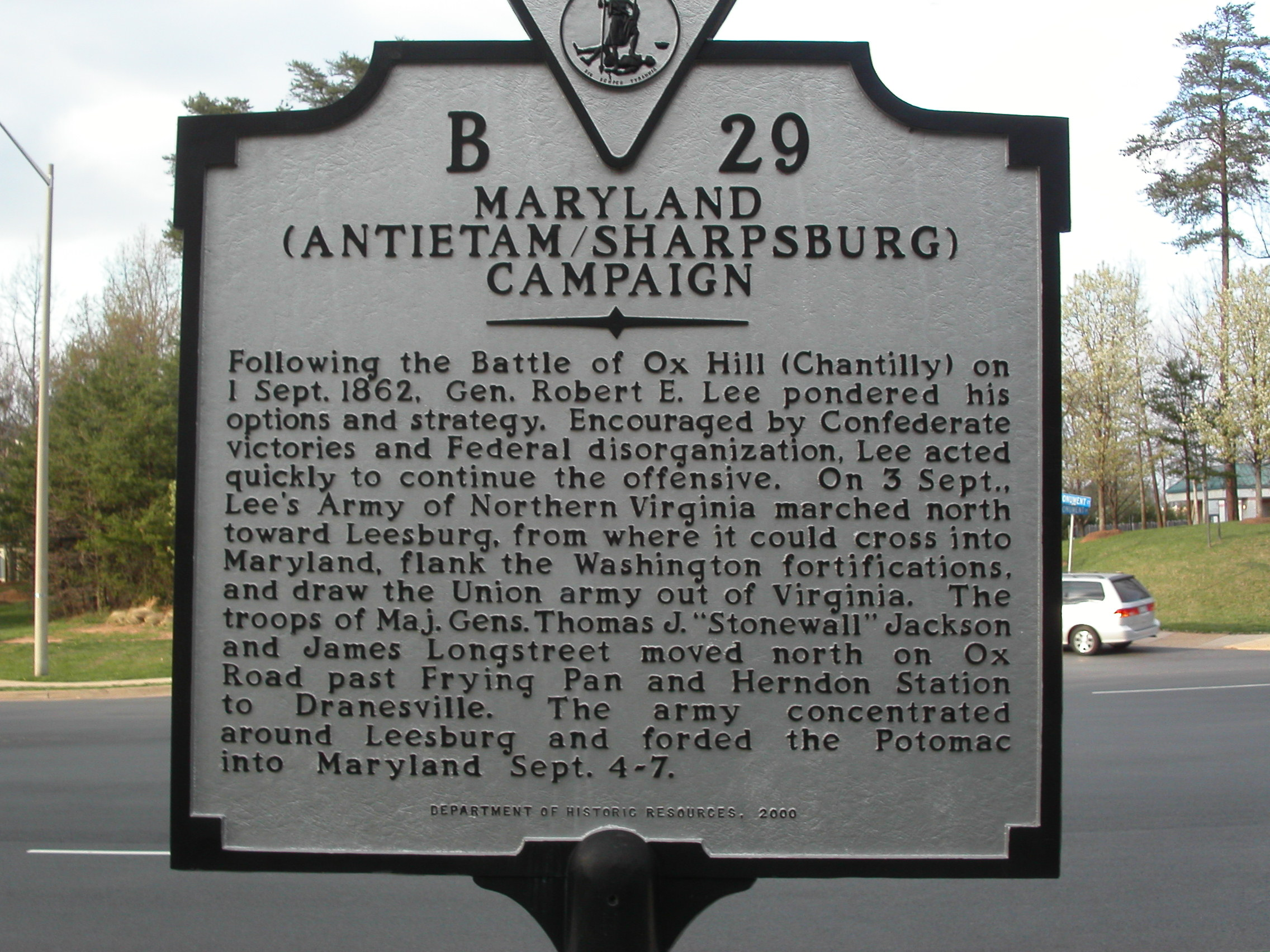
Maryland Campaign Marker

In 2000, two Virginia Historical Markers were put up at the park entrance. Marker B-13, titled Battle of Ox Hill (Chantilly), commemorates the battle while Marker B-29, titled Maryland (Antietam/Sharpsburg) Campaign, commemorates the start of General Lee's Maryland Campaign, which included the Battle of Antietam. Nearby there is one interpretive sign which gives a brief description of the battle.

Three hexagonal information kiosks erected in 2008 by Fairfax County Park Authority tell the story of the battle and its significance to the war in Virginia. The hexagonal information kiosks endeavor to match the color theme of the war, the gray (Confederate) sides or columns topped with blue (Union) roofs.
