= Statue of Philip Kearny =

Public sculpture by Henry Kirke Brown

Philip Kearny
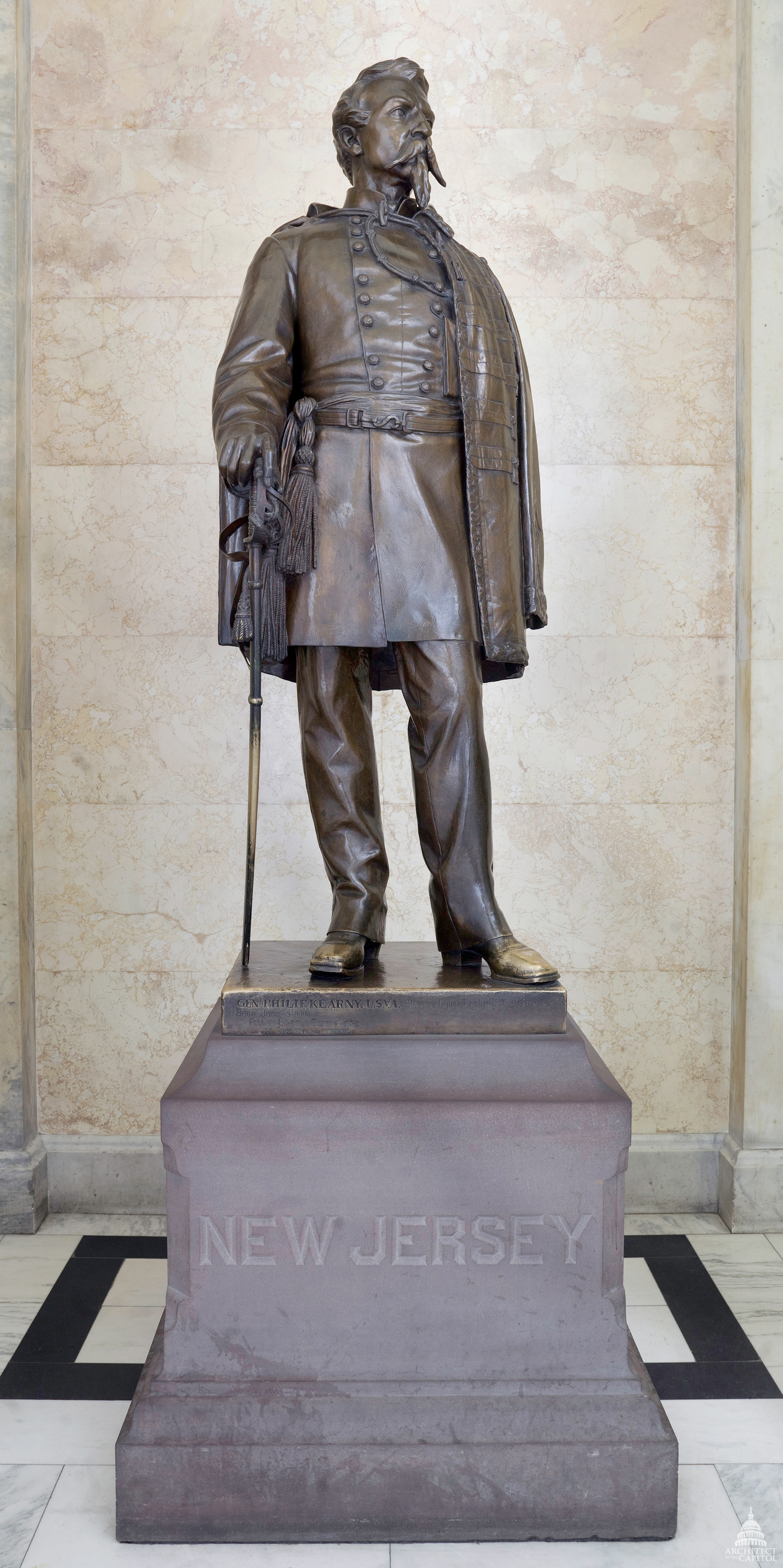
- The sculpture in the National Statuary Hall Collection
- Artist: Henry Kirke Brown
- Subject: Philip Kearny

Philip Kearny is an 1888 bronze sculpture of Philip Kearny by Henry Kirke Brown, installed in the United States Capitol, in Washington, D.C., as part of the National Statuary Hall Collection. It is one of two statues donated by the state of New Jersey.

== Description and history ==
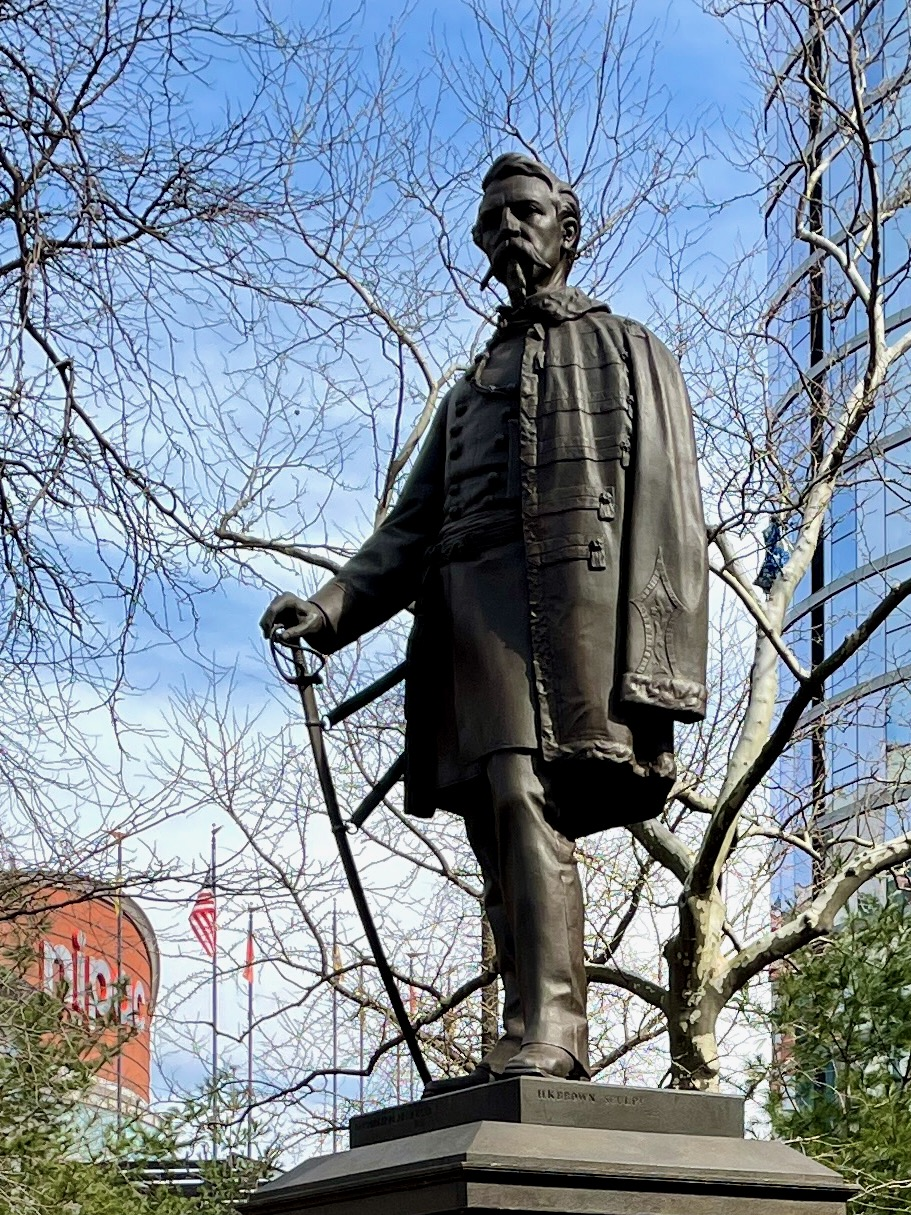
Statue in Military Park

The statue portrays Kearny dressed in the uniform of a Civil War general, holding a sword in his right hand. His coat draped over his left shoulder covers the fact that his left arm had been amputated following the Battle of Churubusco.

Although the statue entered the Hall in 1888 it is dated "1873" on the base. Kearny, described by William Walter Phelps while accepting the statue into the collection on August 21, 1888, called Kearny "the perfect soldier . . .brave as a lion, tender as a woman." A bill to replace the statue in the Capitol with one of suffragist Alice Paul passed the New Jersey Senate on February 10, 2020.

There are at least three other castings of the statue. One done in 1901 is located in Kearny Park, Muskegon, Michigan.

Another was dedicated in 1880 in Trenton, New Jersey and then relocated several times, finally to Military Park in Newark, New Jersey. The Archives of American Art traced the somewhat complicated history of the statue. "In March 1868, the New Jersey legislature approved funding for a bronze portrait of Major General Philip Kearny to be placed in Statuary Hall at the U.S. Capitol. The cast was finished in 1873, but on its way to Washington, the statue was diverted to the State House in Trenton where it ended up in an obscure hallway. In 1880, the mistake was discovered and concerned citizens of Newark petitioned to relocate the sculpture to its original destination in Statuary Hall, and if not there, then to a suitable location in Newark, where Kearney was born and raised. The petition was successful and in 1880, the statue was installed to Newark's Military Park on a Quincy granite base designed by Henry Kirke Brown and architect Paul G. Botticher to resemble an embankment in a war fortification." It was added as a key contributing object to the Military Park Commons Historic District on June 18, 2004.

In 1993, the Newark statue was knocked off its base. In the process of restoring it a cast was taken and another version of the work was created, this one placed in Kearny, New Jersey, a town named after the general and dedicated on September 10, 1993.

== See also ==
- Statues of the National Statuary Hall Collection
- List of public art in Newark, New Jersey
