= Philip Kearny =

US Army Union Army general (1815–1862)

Philip Kearny Jr.
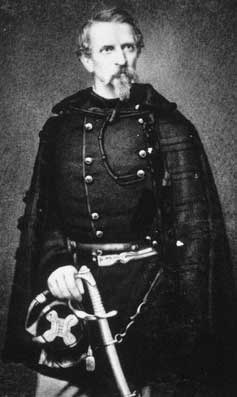
- Philip Kearny
- Born: June 1, 1815; New York City, New York, U.S.
- Died: September 1, 1862 (aged 47) †; Chantilly, Virginia, U.S.
- Burial place: Arlington National Cemetery
- Military career
- Allegiance: United States of America; Second French Empire
- Branch: United States Army: Union Army; French Army
- Service years: 1837–1851; 1861–1862 (US); 1859–1861 (France)
- Rank: Major General
- Nickname: "Kearny the Magnificent"
- Commands: First New Jersey Brigade
- Conflicts: Mexican–American War; Battle of Contreras; Battle of Churubusco (WIA); Second Italian War of Independence; Battle of Solferino; American Civil War; Peninsula Campaign; Battle of Williamsburg; Battle of Fair Oaks; Battle of Glendale; Battle of Malvern Hill; Northern Virginia Campaign; Second Battle of Bull Run; Battle of Chantilly †

Philip Kearny Jr. (/ˈkɑːrni/; June 1, 1815 – September 1, 1862) was a United States Army officer, notable for his leadership in the Mexican–American War and American Civil War. He served in French Emperor Napoleon III's Imperial Guard at the Battle of Solferino. He was also Stephen Watts Kearny's nephew.

The first U.S. citizen to be awarded the French Légion d'Honneur, he was killed in action in the 1862 Battle of Chantilly.

== Early life and career ==
Kearny was born in New York City to a wealthy Irish American family. His father and mother were Philip Kearny Sr. and Susan Watts. His maternal grandfather John Watts, the last Royal Recorder of New York City, was one of New York's wealthiest residents, who had vast holdings in ships, mills, factories, banks, and investment houses. Kearny's father was a Harvard-educated, New York City financier who owned his own brokerage firm and was also a founder of the New York Stock Exchange.

This entire branch of the Kearny family was very particular on how Kearny should be spelled— the Irish way (Kearny) and not the English way (Kearney). They were also sticklers for pronunciation: Kearny rhymes with Killarney. General Philip Kearny was known to throw out letters if his last name was spelled incorrectly, noting that his friends knew how to spell his last name correctly.

Early in life, Kearny desired a career in the military. His parents died when he was young, and he was consequently raised by his grandfather. Against the younger Kearny's wishes, his guardian insisted that Kearny pursue a law career. Kearny attended Columbia College, attaining a law degree in 1833. His cousin John Watts de Peyster, who had also attended Columbia, wrote the first authoritative biography on Kearny.

In 1836, his grandfather died, leaving Kearny a fortune of over $1 million ($29.3 million in 2025 dollars). He chose to make the army his profession. The following year, Kearny obtained a commission as a second lieutenant of cavalry, assigned to the 1st U.S. Dragoons, who were commanded by his uncle, Colonel Stephen W. Kearny, and whose adjutant general was Jefferson Davis. The regiment was assigned to the western frontier.

Kearny was sent to France in 1839 to study cavalry tactics, first attending school at the famous cavalry school in Saumur. He participated in several combat engagements with the Chasseurs d'Afrique in Algeria. Kearny rode into battle with a sword in his right hand, pistol in his left, and the reins in his teeth, as was the style of the Chasseurs. His fearless character in battle earned him the nickname from his French comrades of Kearny le Magnifique ("Kearny the Magnificent"). He returned to the United States in the fall of 1840 and prepared a cavalry manual for the Army based on his experiences overseas.

Shortly afterward, Kearny was designated aide-de-camp to General Alexander Macomb, and served in this position until Macomb's death in June 1841. After a few months at the cavalry barracks in Carlisle, Pennsylvania, Kearny was assigned to the staff of General Winfield Scott, soon becoming his aide-de-camp. He did additional duty on the frontier, accompanying his uncle's unit on an expedition to the South Pass of the Oregon Trail in 1845.

=== Mexican War ===
Kearny, disappointed with the lack of fighting he was seeing in the Army, resigned his commission in 1846, but returned to duty a month later at the outbreak of the Mexican–American War. Kearny was assigned to raise a troop of cavalry for the 1st U.S. Dragoons, Company F, in Terre Haute, Indiana. He spared no expense in recruiting his men and acquired 120 matched dapple gray horses with his own money. The unit was originally stationed at the Rio Grande but soon became the personal bodyguard for General Scott, the commander-in-chief of the Army in Mexico. Kearny was promoted to captain in December 1846.

Kearny and his men participated in the battles of Contreras and Churubusco; in the latter engagement, Kearny led a daring cavalry charge and suffered a grapeshot wound to his left arm. It later had to be amputated. Kearny's courage earned him the respect of his soldiers and fellow officers alike; General-in-Chief Winfield Scott called him "a perfect soldier" and "the bravest man I ever knew." Kearny quickly returned to duty. When the U.S. Army entered Mexico City the following month, he had the personal distinction of being the first man through the gates of the city.

Kearny was an original member of the Aztec Club of 1847, a military society for Army officers who served in Mexico in 1847. Its membership qualifications were later modified to include all American officers who served during the Mexican War and their male descendants.

=== Resignation and service in France ===
After the war, Kearny did a stint with the Army recruiting service in New York City. While there, he was presented with a sword by the Union Club for his service during the war, and was brevetted to major.

In 1851, he was a member of a unit that saw action against the Rogue River Indians in Oregon. After the failure of his marriage, frustrated with the slow promotion process of the Army, Kearny resigned his commission in October of that year. He embarked on a trip around the world, visiting China, Ceylon, and France. In Paris, Kearny fell in love with a New York City woman named Agnes Maxwell, but was unable to marry her because his first wife would not grant him a divorce. In 1854, Kearny was injured when the horse he was riding fell through a rotten bridge. Maxwell moved in to take care of him.

By 1855, Agnes and Kearny had left New York to escape the disapproval of society. They settled in Kearny's new mansion, Bellegrove, overlooking the Passaic River (in what is now Kearny, New Jersey). It was a short distance and across the river from his family's old manor in Newark, New Jersey. In 1858, his wife finally granted a divorce. Kearny and Maxwell moved to Paris, where they were married.

In 1859, Kearny returned to France, re-joining the Chasseurs d'Afrique, who were at the time fighting against Austrian forces in Italy. Later, he was with Napoleon III's Imperial Guard at the Battle of Solferino, where he charged with the cavalry under Général Louis-Michel Morris, which penetrated the Austrian center and captured the key point of the battle. For this action, Kearny was awarded the French Légion d'honneur, becoming the first U.S. citizen to be thus honored.

== Civil War ==
When the American Civil War broke out in 1861, Kearny returned to the United States and was appointed a brigadier general, commanding the First New Jersey Brigade, which he trained. The Army had been reluctant to restore his commission due to his disability, but the shocking Union defeat at the First Battle of Bull Run made them realize the importance of seasoned combat officers. His brigade, even after he left to command a division, performed spectacularly, especially at the Battle of Glendale.

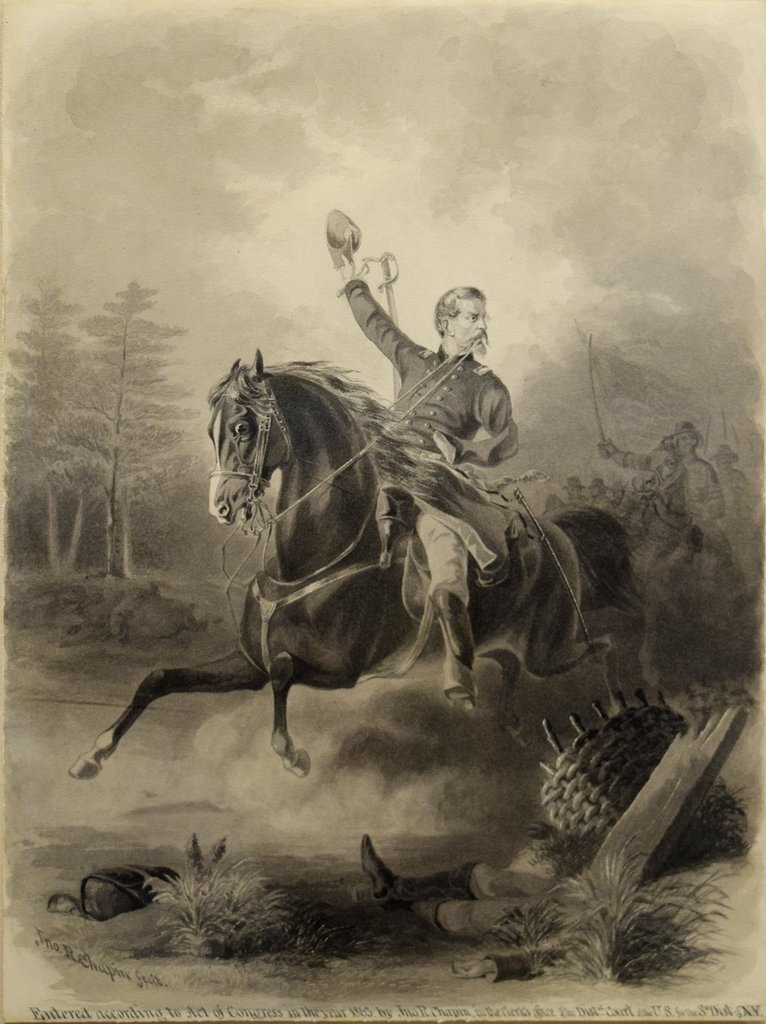
Portrait of Gen. Phil. Kearny by John R. Chapin

He received command of the 3rd Division of the III Corps on April 30, 1862. He led the division into action at the Battle of Williamsburg and the Battle of Fair Oaks. At Williamsburg, as he led his troops onto the field, Kearny shouted (in a notable quote), "I'm a one-armed Jersey son-of-a-gun, follow me!" The general led the charge with his sword in hand, reins in his teeth. He is noted for urging his troops forward by declaring, "Don't worry, men, they'll all be firing at me!" His performance during the Peninsula Campaign earned him much respect from the army and his superiors. He disliked the commander of the Army of the Potomac, Maj. Gen. George B. McClellan, whose orders (especially those to fall back) he frequently ignored. After the Battle of Malvern Hill, which was a Union victory, McClellan ordered a withdrawal, and Kearny wrote:

I, Philip Kearny, an old soldier, enter my solemn protest against this order for retreat. We ought instead of retreating should follow up the enemy and take Richmond. And in full view of all responsible for such declaration, I say to you all, such an order can only be prompted by cowardice or treason.

Kearny is credited with devising the first unit insignia patches used in the U.S. Army. In the summer of 1862, he issued an order that his officers should wear a patch of red cloth on the front of their caps to identify themselves as members of his unit. The enlisted men, with whom Kearny was quite popular, quickly followed suit voluntarily. Members of other units picked up on the idea, devising their own insignia, and these evolved over the years into the modern shoulder patch. (Daniel Butterfield is credited with taking Kearny's idea and standardizing it for all corps in the Army of the Potomac, designing most of the corps badges.) Kearny was promoted to major general on July 4, 1862, in a blanket promotion of McClellan's corps and division commanders.

=== Death ===
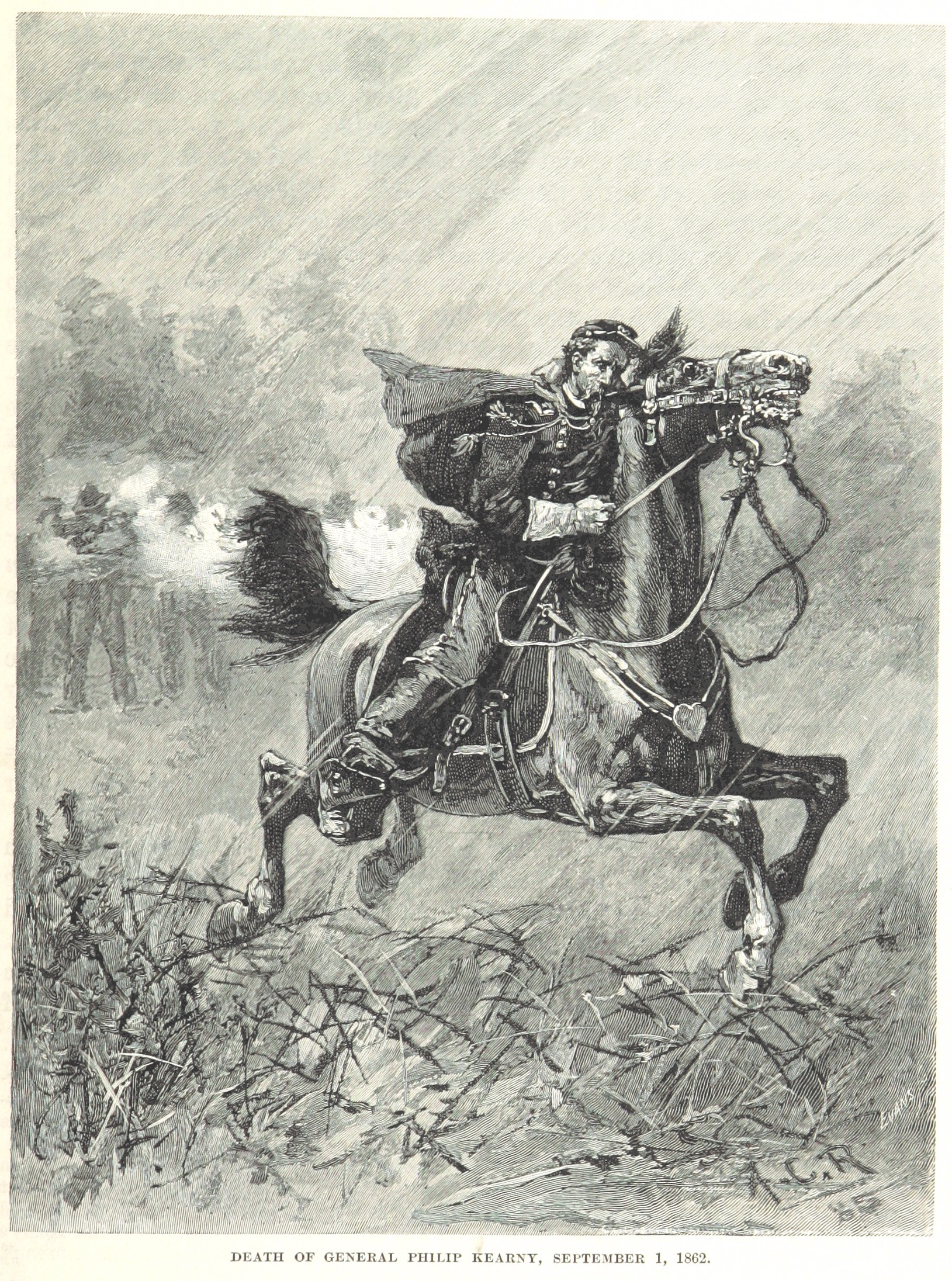
Death of General Philip Kearny

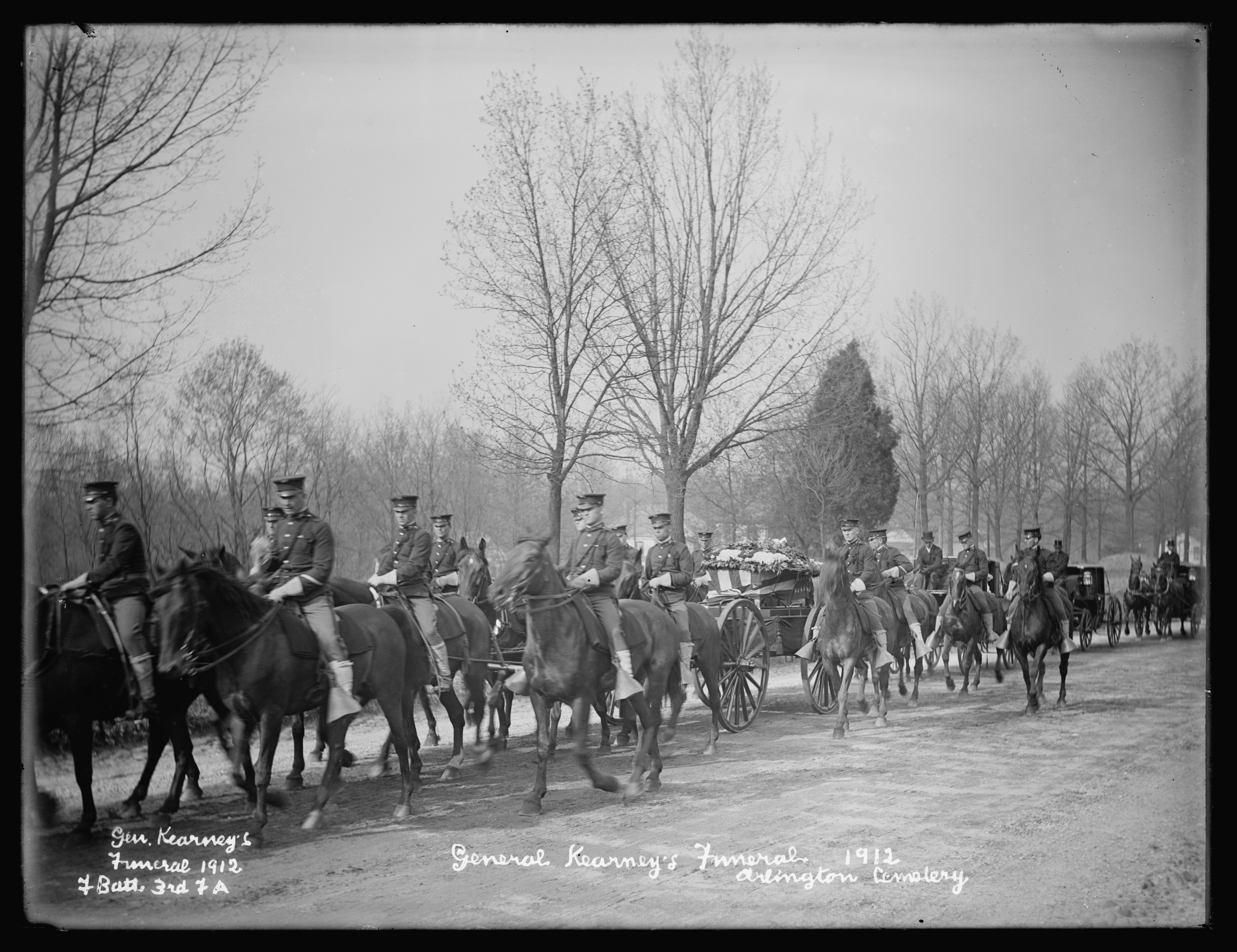
Kearny's funeral at Arlington National Cemetery (April 12, 1912)

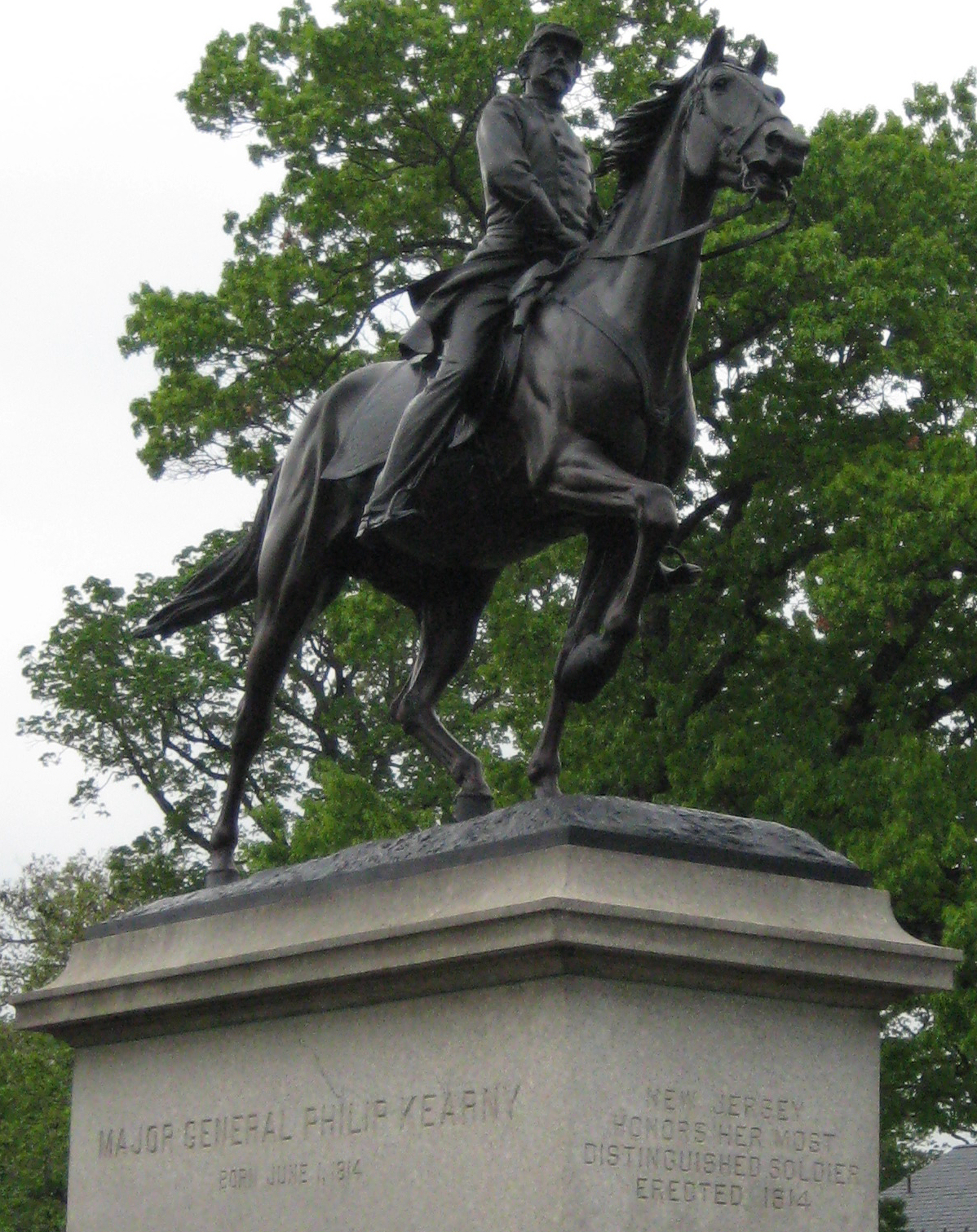
Dedicated in 1914, an equestrian statue by Edward Clark Potter marks Kearny's grave in Arlington National Cemetery.

By the end of August 1862, General Kearny led his division at the disastrous Second Battle of Bull Run, which saw the Union Army routed and nearly destroyed by Gen. Robert E. Lee's Confederate Army of Northern Virginia. The Union army retreated toward Washington and fought with the pursuing Confederate corps under Stonewall Jackson on September 1, 1862, at the Battle of Chantilly. In a violent storm with lightning and pouring rain, Kearny decided to investigate a gap in the Union line. Responding to warnings of a subordinate, he said, "The Rebel bullet that can kill me has not yet been molded." Encountering Confederate troops, Kearny ignored a demand to surrender and, while he tried to escape on horseback, a "half dozen muskets fired" and he was shot with a Minié ball that entered his hip and came out his shoulder, killing him instantly. Confederate Maj. Gen. A.P. Hill, upon hearing the gunfire, ran up to the body of the illustrious soldier with a lantern and exclaimed, "You've killed Phil Kearny! He deserved a better fate than to die in the mud."

Kearny's body was borne to the rear after the Confederates realized that a general officer had been killed. Confederate soldiers quickly proceeded to strip Kearny's body of his coat, boots, pocket watch, papers, and other items of value. However, after it was realized who the deceased was, Robert E. Lee ordered all of his belongings returned over the objections of poorly clad soldiers who protested that a dead man no longer needed a warm coat and boots. Kearny's papers were given to Lee for examination, but they merely consisted of personal letters to his wife and contained no useful military documents; Lee quickly burned them. General Lee sent his body back to the Union forces with a condolence note.

At the time of Kearny's death, there were rumors in Washington that President Abraham Lincoln was contemplating replacing George B. McClellan with "Kearny the Magnificent".

Kearny was buried at Trinity Churchyard in New York after his remains were transported from his residence in East Newark, New Jersey. In 1912, his remains were exhumed and re-interred at Arlington National Cemetery, where there is a statue by Edward Clark Potter in his honor, one of only two equestrian statues at Arlington. The re-interment drive was spearheaded by Medal of Honor recipient Charles F. Hopkins, who had served under General Kearny in the First New Jersey Brigade. The statue was dedicated by President Woodrow Wilson in November 1914. It was refurbished in 1996 by the General Philip Kearny Memorial Committee, a New Jersey nonprofit corporation.

== Legacy and honors ==
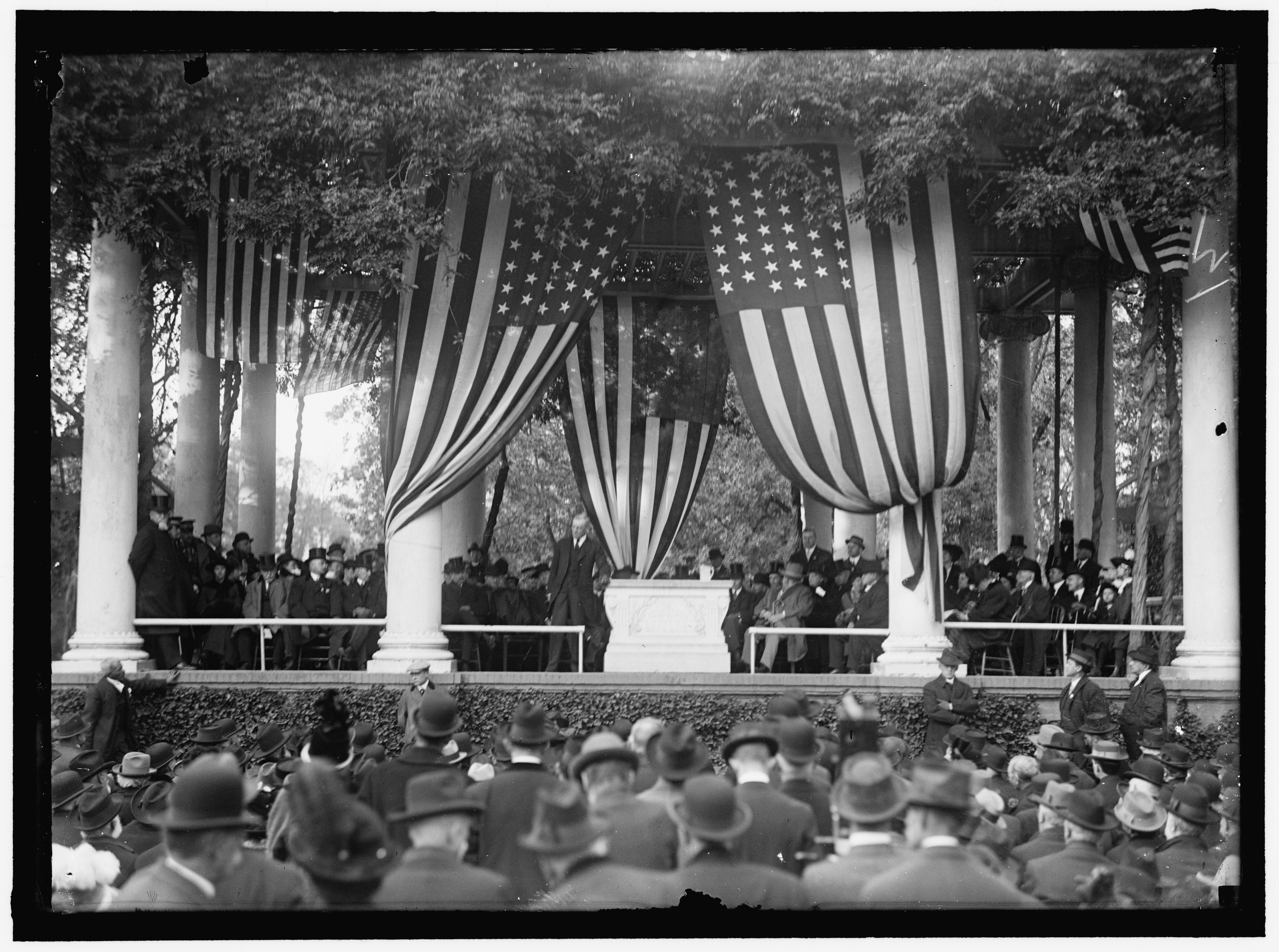
President Woodrow Wilson spoke at the dedication of the statue marking Kearny's grave in Arlington National Cemetery (November 11, 1914).

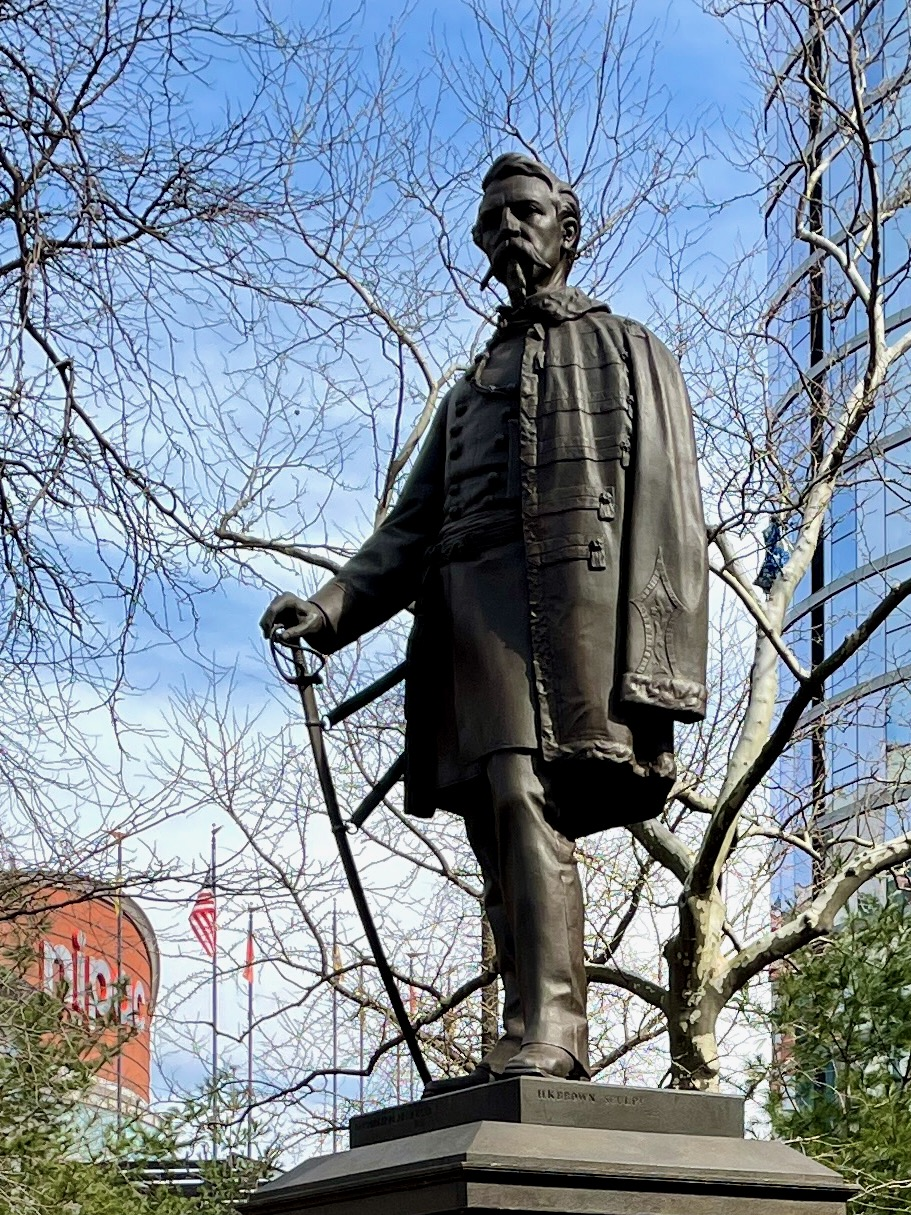
Statue in Military Park, Newark, New Jersey

- The town of Kearny, New Jersey, is named in his honor. A statue honoring him was erected outside the main branch of the Kearny post office. The Kearny Museum contains a display of furniture from his Belle Grove home, donated by his granddaughter and second wife, as well as other Kearny memorabilia.
- Fort Kearny, near Tenleytown, D.C., was named in his honor. It was part of the ring of defenses protecting the city of Washington, D.C.
- Fort Phil Kearny in Wyoming was named for him; it existed only two years.
- A statue of Kearny represents New Jersey in the National Statuary Hall Collection in the U.S. Capitol.
- Kearny Memorial Park in Muskegon, MI features a statue of Kearny and a fountain donated in his honor
- A statue of Kearny stands in Military Park, Newark, New Jersey.
- A small monument in Ox Hill Battlefield Park commemorates Kearny's death.
- A bas-relief on the First New Jersey Brigade monument at Gettysburg commemorates Kearny's leadership, although he was killed prior to that battle.
- The General Philip Kearny Public School in Philadelphia was named for him when built in 1921.
- During World War II, the United States Navy named a Liberty Ship the SS Philip Kearny.
- Kearny County, Kansas, is named for him.
- In 2017, Kearny was inducted into the New Jersey Hall of Fame.

== See also ==
- List of American Civil War generals (Union)
- Kearny Cross
- Battle of Solferino, decisive Franco-Sardinian victory of Napoleon III, Emperor of the French
