= Jermantown, Virginia =

Unincorporated community in Virginia, United States

- Unincorporated community
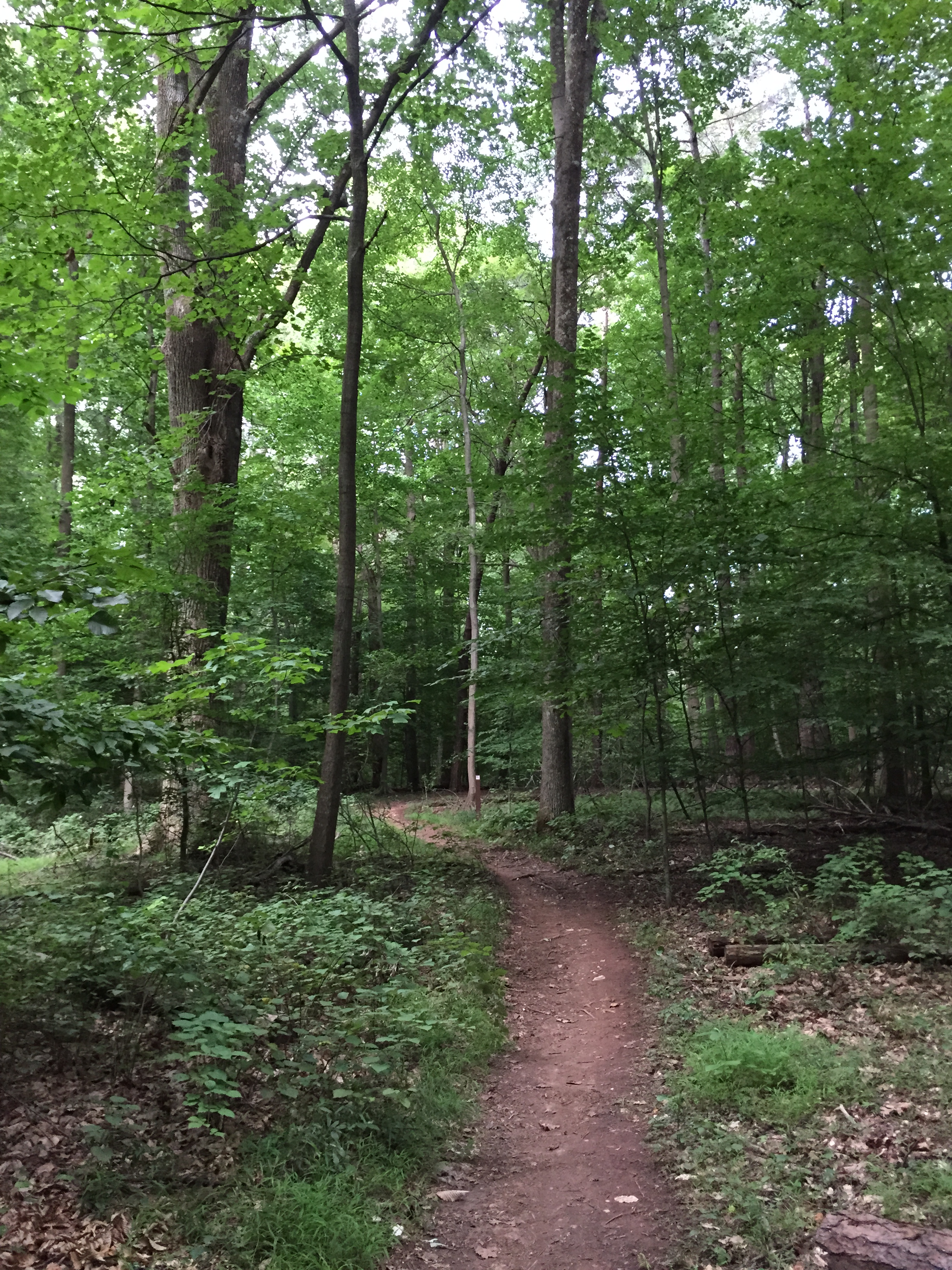
- View east along the Gerry Connolly Cross County Trail between Miller Heights Road and Jermantown Road in Fairfax County

- Location within Northern Virginia Location within Virginia Location within the United States
- Coordinates: 38°51′25″N 77°19′56″W
- Country: United States
- State: Virginia
- County: Fairfax
- Time zone: UTC−5 (Eastern (EST))
  - Summer (DST): UTC−4 (EDT)
- GNIS feature ID: 1495006

Jermantown is an unincorporated community in Fairfax County, Virginia, United States. Various parts of Jermantown are included within the independent city of Fairfax to its south and east. Today, this once rural community is centered at the intersection of Jermantown Road and Lee Jackson Memorial Highway (U.S. Route 50). The Old Jermantown School was located at the present site of Providence Elementary School.

== History ==
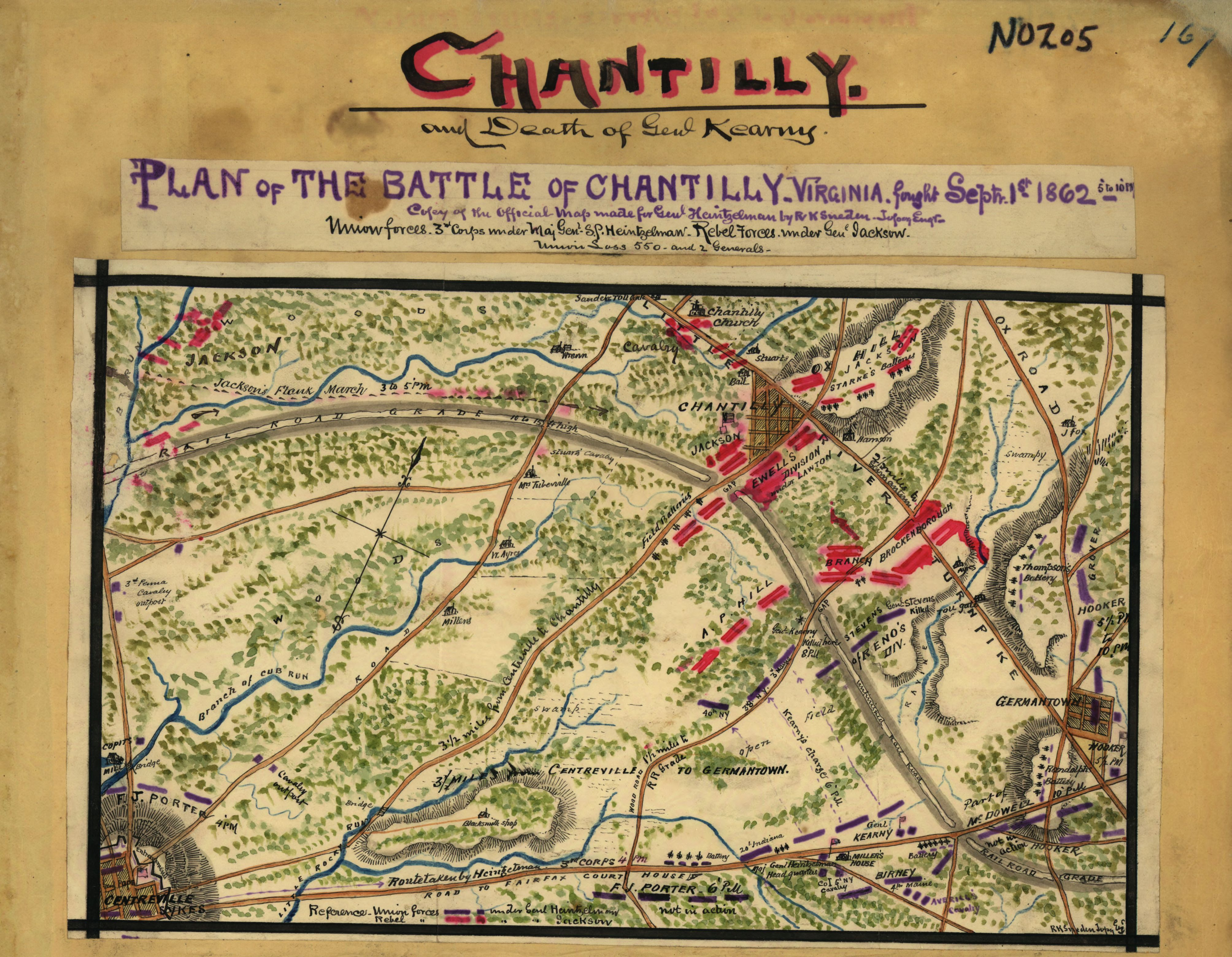
Map of Ox Hill battle

Jermantown/Germantown, located near the critical intersection of the Little River Turnpike (today Route 50) and Warrenton Turnpike (today Route 29), was part of the Ox Hill battlefield on September 1, 1862, and was held by Union troops under General Joseph Hooker.
