= Luana Reyes =

Native American activist (1933–2001)

- Reyes in 2000
- Born: February 20, 1933; Portland, Oregon
- Died: November 5, 2001 (aged 68)
- Occupation: Health care administrator

Luana Reyes (February 20, 1933 – November 5, 2001) was an American Indian health care administrator. As executive director of the Seattle Indian Health Board (SIHB) 1972–1982, she grew that institution from a staff of five to nearly 200 and made it a model for urban Indian institutions; subsequently, she worked for the federal Indian Health Service, eventually becoming deputy director of that 14,000-person institution.

On October 10, 2001, shortly before her death from aplastic anemia at the age of 68, she received the Presidential Rank Meritorious Award.

== Life ==
Reyes was born in Portland, Oregon. Her mother, born Mary Christian, was Sin Aikst (now known as Lakes tribe, one of the Confederated Tribes of the Colville Reservation); her father, Julian Reyes, was Filipino, but had largely assimilated to an Indian way of life. Her mother's father, Alex Christian, was known as Pic Ah Kelowna, "White Grizzly Bear"; her great-uncle (brother of her maternal grandmother) was Chief James Bernard, a Sin Aikst leader in the early 20th century.

Reyes' early childhood was spent largely on the Colville Indian Reservation in Washington. In 1935–1937, during the period of construction of the Grand Coulee Dam, her parents had moved to the Coulee and started a Chinese restaurant even though "[n]either of them could prepare Chinese food except for simple dishes such as pork fried rice, egg foo-yung, and chop suey". They soon acquired an ethnically Chinese partner and cook, Harry Wong; Wong bought them out of the restaurant in 1937. Her parents separated in 1939 and subsequently divorced; her mother would later work again for Wong in Tacoma, Washington, and eventually marry him.

From 1940 to 1942, Reyes and her older brother Lawney were students at the Chemawa Indian School five miles north of Salem, Oregon After graduating at the head of her class from Okanogan High School (Okanogan, Washington) in 1951, she moved to Tacoma, Washington, living with her mother, working in a department store and for Harry Wong's restaurant. She worked over the next twenty years in the private sector in San Francisco, Hawaii, and Seattle before succeeding her younger brother, activist Bernie Whitebear, as executive director of the Seattle Indian Health Board, which, over the next decade she transformed from a tiny organization with a staff of five into "a comprehensive community health care center with a multimillion-dollar budget and over 190 full-time health professionals and support staff." During this time, she helped to found the American Indian Health Care Association, now known as the National Council on Urban Indian Health. Subsequently, after a brief stint as executive director of the Puyallup Nation Health Authority community health program, she worked at the headquarters of the federal Indian Health Service (Rockville, Maryland), eventually becoming director of headquarters operations, chief financial officer, and deputy director of that 14,000-person institution.

== Family ==
She had one child, a daughter, Kecia, born in 1985. Reyes' brother, Bernie Whitebear (1937–2000), was a prominent activist, not only founder of SIHB, but co-founder of the United Indians of All Tribes Foundation, and the Daybreak Star Cultural Center; her older brother Lawney Reyes is a sculptor, designer, curator, and memoirist.

== Legacy ==
There is now a Luana Reyes Leadership Award named in her honor.

The Reyes Building located at 801 Thompson Avenue, Rockville, Maryland is named in her honor.
