= Samuel B. McKinney =

American Christian pastor and civil rights leader (1926–2018)

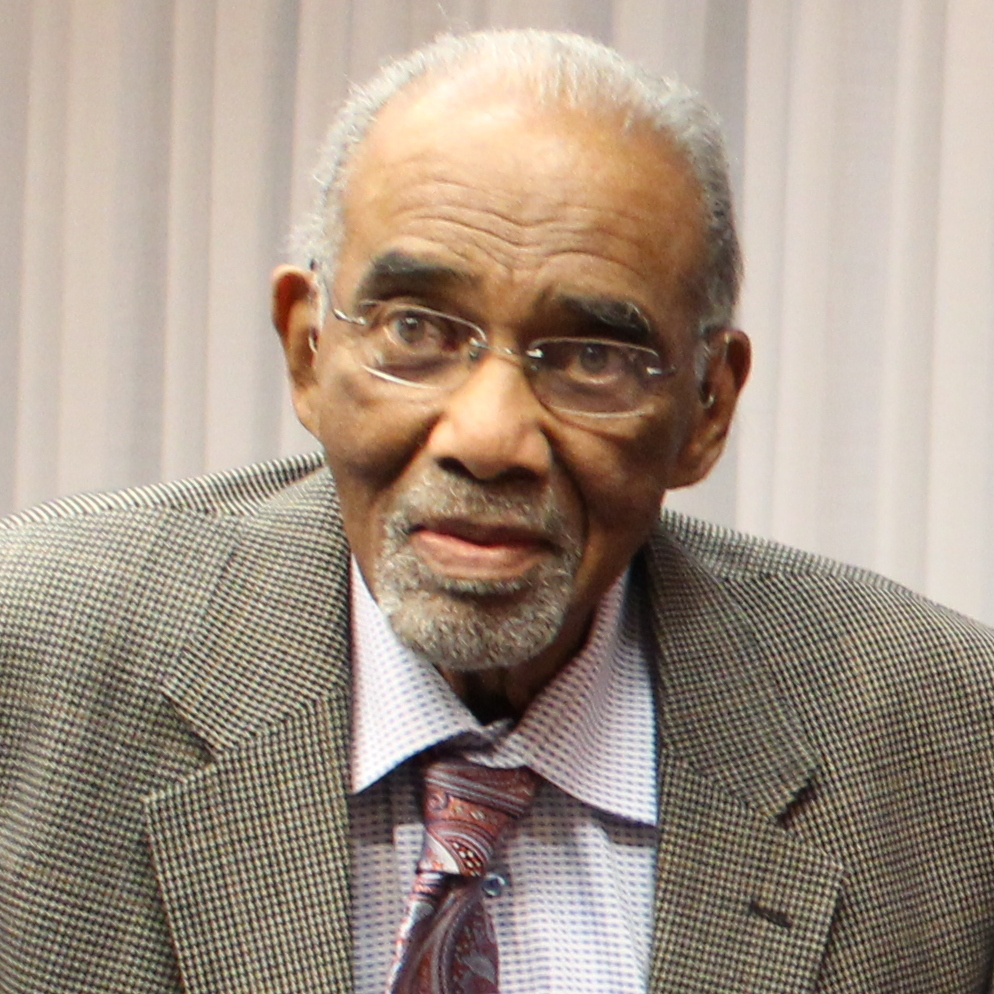
- Civil rights leader Reverend Dr. Samuel B. McKinney, a noted on the occasion of Seattle honorarily naming a section of 19th Ave after him.
- Born: December 28, 1926; Flint, Michigan, U.S.
- Died: April 7, 2018 (aged 91); Seattle, Washington, U.S.
- Education: Morehouse College; Colgate Rochester Crozer Divinity School
- Occupations: Pastor, civil rights leader
- Spouse: Louise Jones
- Children: Dr. Lora-Ellen McKinney and Rhoda Eileen McKinney-Jones
- Parent(s): Wade Hampton McKinney; Annie Ruth Berry

Samuel Berry McKinney (December 28, 1926 – April 7, 2018) was an American Christian pastor and Civil Rights leader. He was the pastor of Mount Zion Baptist Church in Seattle for four decades. He attended the Selma to Montgomery marches in 1965, and he served on the Seattle Human Rights Commission.

== Early life ==
Samuel Berry McKinney was born on December 28, 1926, in Flint, Michigan, to Ruth Berry and Wade Hampton McKinney. He grew up in Cleveland, Ohio, where his father was a pastor. Samuel had an older brother, Wade, and two twin sisters, Virginia Ruth and Mary Louise.

The older Wade's father was a sharecropper in Georgia, and Wade and his siblings worked in the fields as well. When Wade's brother George got in a fight with the landowner, Andrew Thompson, he was attacked by a posse and fled to Ohio. Wade soon left to go to Atlanta Baptist College, followed by Rochester Theological Seminary. He married Ruth Berry, who was the daughter of a Baptist minister.

Wade pushed against racial discrimination and hosted civil rights leaders like Thurgood Marshall, Walter White, and A. Philip Randolph at his church, and Samuel heard them as a child. Ruth became the president of the Greater Cleveland Council of American Baptist Women, and was named second vice-president of the American Baptist Convention, the first Black woman to hold that role. McKinney said his mother was loving and involved, but used frequent physical discipline.

== Education and Army service ==
McKinney was drafted in 1945, during his freshman year at Morehouse College. He served in the Army Air Forces during World War II before graduating in 1949. He wanted to become a civil rights lawyer, but Morehouse president Benjamin Mays convinced him to switch to ministry. McKinney later said that a professor told him that law can combat injustices once they are committed, but religion can change people and institutions before they commit injustices.

McKinney's time at college was his first time in the Deep South, which had deeper segregation and more hostile racism than he had experienced before. His parents warned him about keeping quiet to avoid trouble, but he also saw how black workers in the South could covertly retaliate against their patrons' racism. At Morehouse, McKinney also deepened his friendship with Martin Luther King Jr., who he had befriended at religious conventions as children.

During World War II McKinney grew outraged at the racism he and other African-Americans encountered. The American Red Cross held a heavily publicized national blood drive, but initially banned blood donations from Black people, and later segregated their blood when public outcry forced a policy change. Then when McKinney was drafted in 1945, the U.S. Army remained segregated. He recalled one dining experience as he traveled through Texas, when all Black diners ate from cardboard plates with wooden knives in a small room, while white diners, including German prisoners-of-war, ate with a tablecloth, silverware, and cut glass stemware.

McKinney earned a divinity degree from Colgate Rochester Crozer Divinity School in 1952.

== Church leadership ==
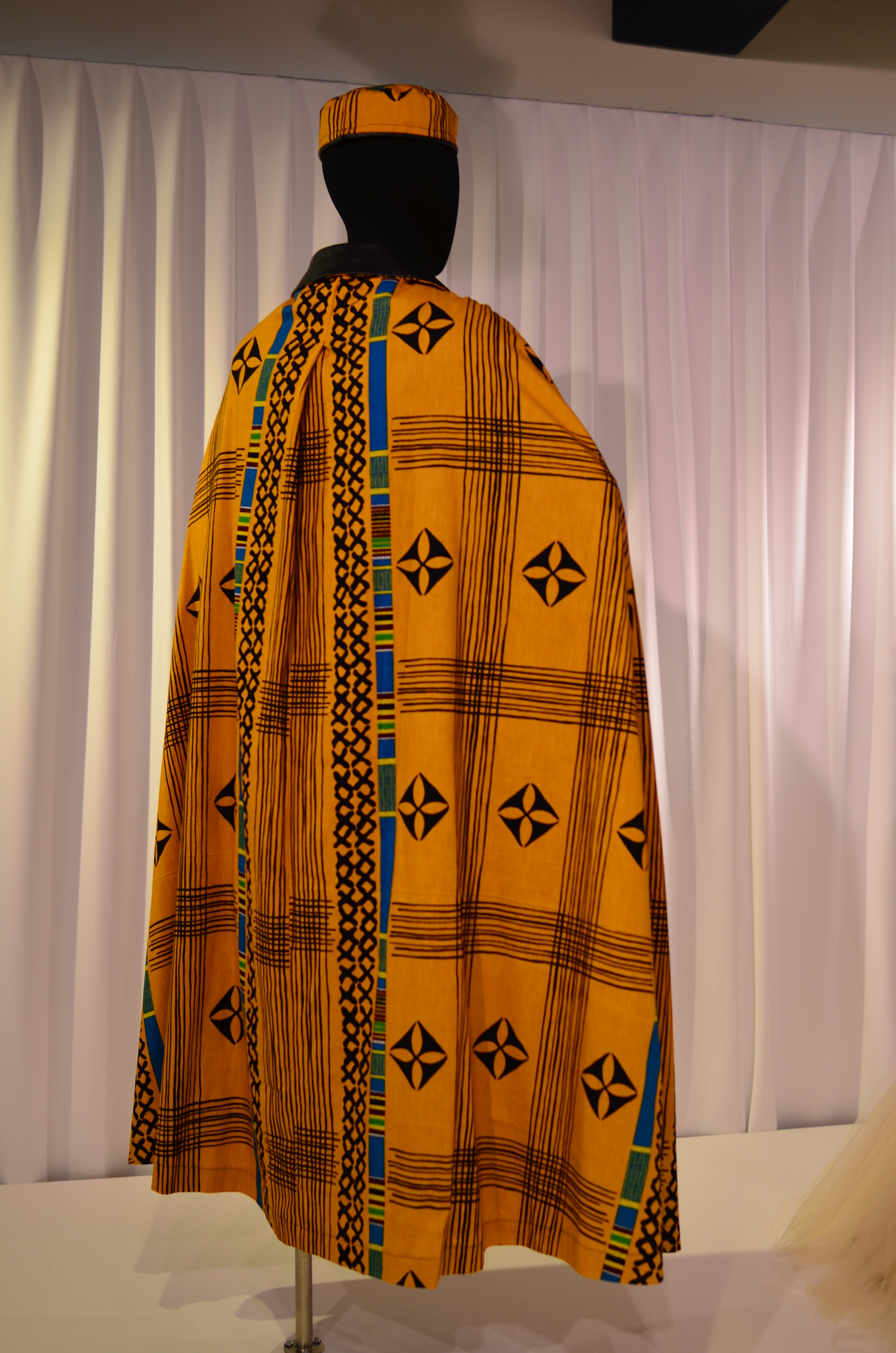
Church robe and hat worn by McKinney in the 1970s and 1980s.

McKinney began his ministry in Providence, Rhode Island, where he was the pastor of Olney Street Baptist Church from 1955 to 1958. He moved to Seattle, Washington in 1958, where he served as the pastor of Mount Zion Baptist Church from 1958 to 1998, and from 2005 to 2008.

Mount Zion was one of the oldest Black churches in Seattle, located in the Central District. It was also one of Washington's oldest and largest Black churches. Seattle's Black population had quadrupled after World War II, when wartime jobs were abundant. Most of Seattle's Black residents lived in the Central District because they were blocked from living anywhere else, due to racial restrictive covenants.

In 1958 McKinney helped found Mount Zion Baptist Church Credit Union, the first protestant credit union in the Pacific Northwest. He later saw the church found a preschool and kindergarten, as well as the Ethnic School, later renamed the Louise Jones McKinney Learning Center. In 1975, Mount Zion built a new sanctuary inspired by African influences. McKinney also led the church as it started a $20,000 annual academic scholarship fund.

McKinney made the church the largest Black church in Washington, growing it from 800 members to over 2,500 during his tenure.

=== Academia ===
McKinney returned to the Colgate Rochester Crozer Divinity School to earn a Doctor of Ministry degree in 1975.

With Floyd Massey Jr., McKinney co-authored Church Administration in the Black Perspective. According to The Los Angeles Times, "The book outlined the need for strong, charismatic ministers in urban black churches and remains an important reference work in church organization."

The 2004 anthology Words? Words! Words., edited by Georgia S. McDade and sharing the poetry of the African-American Writers' Alliance, features a foreword by McKinney. In it, he writes: "Prose and poetry permit persons to speak, write, sing, and play out of the depths of their soul. Much of what you will encounter within this document–in the words of James Weldon Johnson–'hammered out on the anvil of adversity.' "

== Civil Rights activism ==
McKinney invited Civil Rights leader Martin Luther King Jr. to Seattle in 1961, and he attended the Selma to Montgomery marches in 1965. McKinney shaped a major role in Seattle's civil rights movement, along with other religious leaders like John Hurst Adams, Mance Jackson, Lemuel Petersen, Thomas Connolly, Raphael Levine, and Peter Raible.^{:70} McKinney sought spiritual and practical solutions to institutional racism, combating redlining and financial exclusion.

=== Fair employment ===
In 1961, the Baptist Ministers Alliance and the local Congress of Racial Equality (CORE) decided to protest the unfair hiring practices of local grocery stores, which employed very few Black workers. That August, volunteers handed out boycott leaflets in the Central District that said "Don't Shop Where You Can't Work...Quit buying discrimination". They targeted Safeway first, and McKinney represented the Baptist Ministers Alliance during negotiations with CORE and the store before calling for a boycott of a Central District location. In less than a month Safeway agreed to hire Black workers and create a branch employment office in the neighborhood, and negotiations soon proceeded successfully with other managers of local grocery stores.^{:57}

In 1963, CORE decided to protest Downtown Seattle businesses that did not hire Black workers. They began with the Bon Marché because it employed none except for its cleaning staff and waiters. Following unsuccessful negotiations, Jackson, McKinney, and Reginald Alleyne led a march of over 1,000 people on June 15 from Mount Zion to downtown. McKinney told the Seattle Times that "we are serving notice in a peaceful, Christian way that segregation and discrimination must go". The store tried to avert a protest by hiring 25 Black employees days before the march, and while the march went ahead, CORE decided to cancel picketing the store.^{:57-58}

=== Fair housing ===
On June 24, 1963, McKinney, Adams, Jackson, and Petersen spoke to Seattle's other clergy at a meeting inside Mount Zion, committing the audience to join a march for open housing. Days later, 84 religious leaders signed a strong statement in support of the civil rights movement.^{:55} McKinney and Jackson led a march on city hall, where many youth activists staged a daylong sit-in of the mayor's office. That year, Mayor Clinton had proposed creating a city human rights commission to monitor housing discrimination rather than creating an ordinance, which was opposed by real estate and business interests. Two weeks after the sit-in, the city council decided to create the commission rather than pass an ordinance. McKinney was one of the two Black members of the inaugural 12-person committee.^{:59-60} However, as part of the Seattle Human Rights Commission, he eventually helped pass Seattle's first fair-housing act.

=== Education and financial opportunity ===
McKinney also marched for other civil rights causes, and advocated for equal treatment in jobs, housing, and education alongside the local CORE, NAACP, and Urban League leadership. He helped to desegregate schools and participated in boycotts of hotels, businesses, and the civil service to change their discriminatory employment practices. The Central Area Civil Rights Committee formed in 1962 in pursuit of desegregating Seattle Public Schools, led by Jackson and later Adams.^{:63} McKinney served on the committee along with Walt Hundley, Charles Johnson, and E. June Smith, with Mineo Katagiri joining later.^{:63}

McKinney was a co-founder of Liberty Bank, "the first black-owned bank in Seattle." He started it because local banks would deny loans to Black applicants. In 1966 he co-founded the Seattle Opportunity Industrialization Center (SOIC) and was its first president and CEO. The SOIC was a nonprofit that provided vocational training. It was inspired by Leon Sullivan's Opportunities Industrialization Center, started two years earlier in Philadelphia. In its first few years, it trained and found employment for over 900 students, and it became a key training opportunity for Black residents in Seattle during the 1970s.^{:59}

=== Other activism ===
McKinney continued his civil rights activism throughout his career. In 1985, he was arrested at a protest against apartheid outside the South African consul's house. He was the first Black president of the Church Council of Greater Seattle, chaired the Washington State Rainbow Coalition, and was a board member for the Meredith Mathews East Madison YMCA, Fred Hutchinson Cancer Research Center, and Washington Mutual Savings Bank.

McKinney spoke at a Seattle prayer vigil for Trayvon Martin.

== Personal life and death ==
McKinney married Louise Jones; they had two daughters. Jones directed Seattle Public Schools' early childhood education program and died in 2012.

McKinney died on April 7, 2018.

== Legacy ==
In 1998, the Samuel Berry McKinney Manor was built across the street from the Mount Zion church, with 40 affordable housing units.

McKinney was chosen as Seafair's King Neptune for 2003, alongside Rita Ryder as Queen Alcyone. Two more activists were chosen in the following years, as outsider selections that surprised the activists themselves: Roberto Maestas and Bob Santos of the Gang of Four.

In 2014, the Seattle City Council named a street after McKinney, naming 19th Avenue in front of the Mount Zion Baptist Church the "Rev. Dr. S. McKinney Avenue". Senator Maria Cantwell honored McKinney at the floor of the U.S. Senate on May 7, 2018.

== Works ==
- McKinney, Samuel B.; Massey, Floyd (1976). Church Administration in the Black Perspective. Valley Forge, Pennsylvania: Judson Press. ISBN 9780817014537.
