= El Centro de la Raza =

Service agency in Seattle, Washington, U.S.

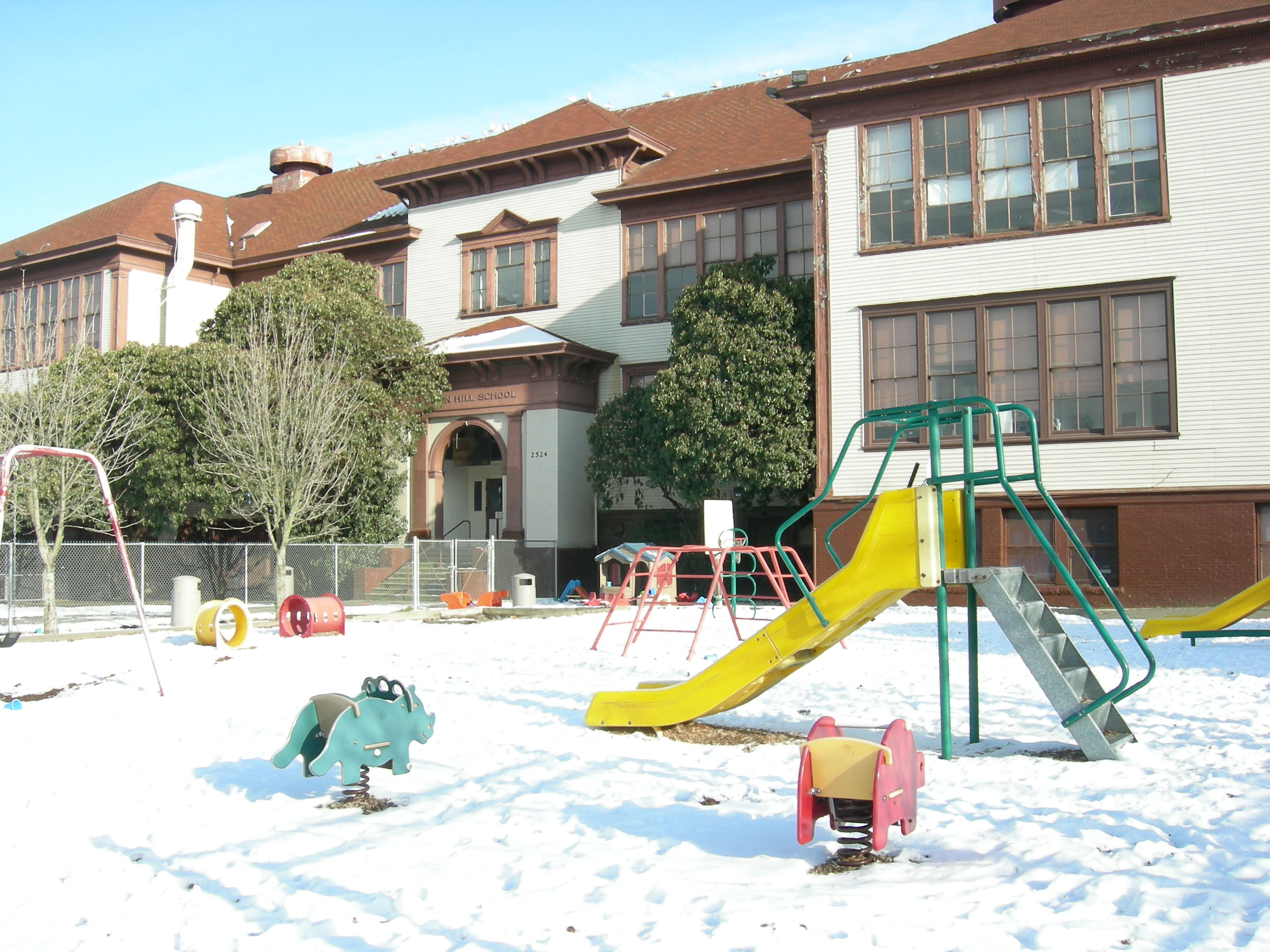
El Centro de la Raza, 2007

El Centro de la Raza in Seattle, Washington, United States, is an educational, cultural, and social service agency, centered in the Latino/Chicano community and headquartered in the former Beacon Hill Elementary School on Seattle's Beacon Hill. It was founded in 1972 and continues to serve clients in Seattle, King County and beyond. It is considered a significant part of civil rights history in the Pacific Northwest.

== History ==
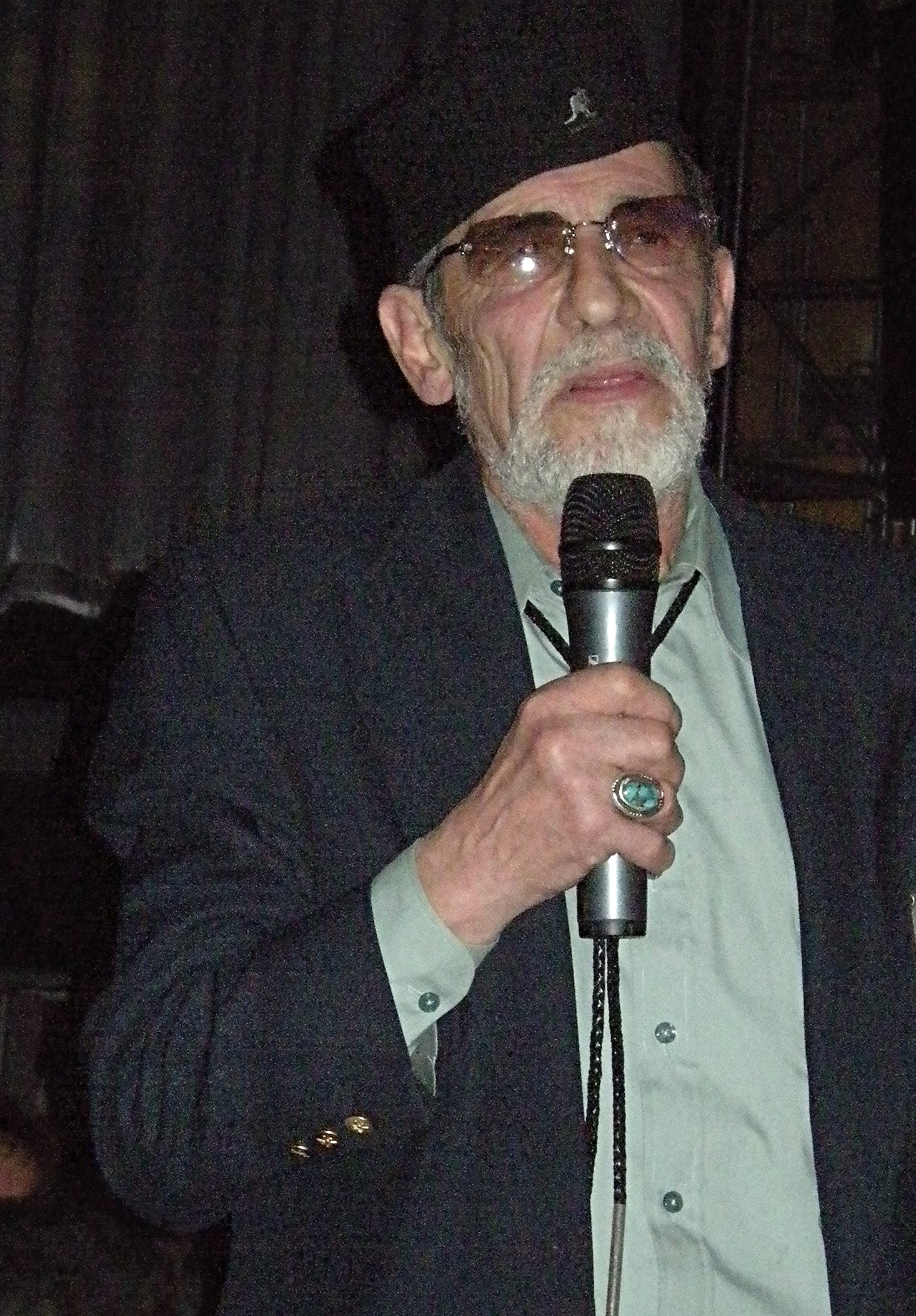
Roberto Maestas, 2008

In the early 1960s thousands of Latinos in Seattle, nearly all of whom were seeking employment, found themselves lacking a traditional community center: a barrio, with a Latin American-style plaza. In early 1972, the ESL Program at South Seattle Community College suddenly found themselves without a physical home. Inspired by the 1970 occupation by Native Americans of the decommissioned Fort Lawton in Seattle's Magnolia neighborhood, which resulted in the founding of the Daybreak Star Cultural Center, members of the ESL program occupied an empty school building originally built in 1904 in Seattle's Beacon Hill neighborhood that had been closed due to declining student enrollment. On October 11, 1972 the group established itself as El Centro de la Raza.

Leaders of the building takeover quickly won a pledge from Seattle Public Schools superintendent Forbes Bottomly that no effort would be made to evict them by force. The school district even arranged to open a back door for fire safety. The school had a sprinkler system, but its water long had been cut off. After three months of occupying the building and numerous rallies, petitions and letters, the Seattle City Council agreed to hear their case. At one point, pressing for an audience, supporters of the occupation had laid siege to the City Council's chambers. The people who occupied the building joked that they were simply implementing advice from Washington governor Dan Evans, "advocating use of empty schools for community needs, such as child care". The City Council finally approved the lease, but mayor Wes Uhlman vetoed the action. Supporters then occupied the mayor's office and were arrested. An accord was finally reached with a five-year lease signed January 20, 1973 at $1 rent annually.

Cofounder Roberto Maestas, executive director until 2009, worked with community leaders Larry Gossett, Bob Santos, and Bernie Whitebear, also known as the Gang of Four as they established a unique ethnic alliance that lead to the founding of El Centro de la Raza.

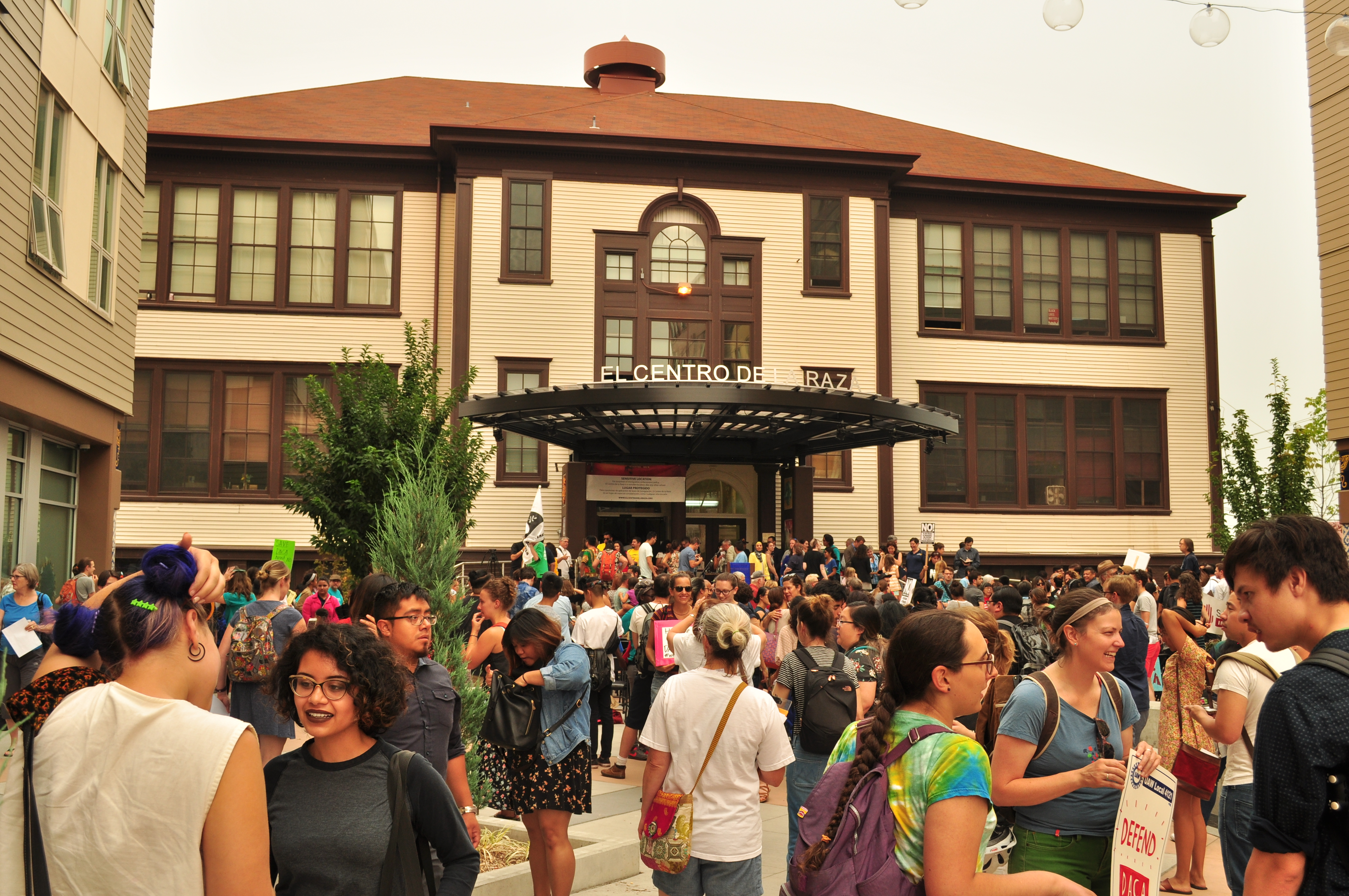
El Centro (south façade) and Plaza Roberto Maestas, September 2017

More than 20 years later, Maestas would remark, "I found that the only way to get things done in this city is to do it -- and then work it out... It took five to six years for the building to become up to code. Everything had to be repaired, replaced or installed. With the help, love and dedication of the community, the organization's building was refurbished piece by piece. Money was donated. Grants were awarded. Materials were donated, as well. Laborers volunteered time. Plumbers gave services. Heating and plumbing were installed. The roof was fixed. Vinyl siding was put in place. The classrooms were spruced up."

In 2007, El Centro celebrated its 35th anniversary with a gathering of nearly 1,000 people at the Washington State Convention and Trade Center in Seattle.

== Social activism ==
During the early 1980s, when the Reagan Administration was supporting the Nicaraguan Contras, El Centro played a major role in convincing the Seattle City Council to adopt Managua as a sister city, despite strong initial opposition from Seattle City Council. El Centro's bond with Nicaragua was forged before the Sandinistas took power in 1979. The relationship between El Centro and Managua began following the 1972 Nicaragua Earthquake and El Centro was able to coordinate relief efforts in the Seattle area.

The organization continued to practice direct action. When the Washington Natural Gas Company cut off El Centro's heat, the teachers and children of the child-development center sat in the office of the CEO of Washington Natural Gas until the gas was restored.

== Affordable housing ==
Since 2015, El Centro de la Raza has developed several buildings with affordable housing and community services in Seattle and the surrounding region. The organization's first project, Plaza Roberto Maestas, opened in 2015 with 112 apartment rental units designated for low-income households of under $49,000 annually. The building is adjacent to the Beacon Hill light rail station and El Centro de la Raza's main offices; it also has retail space, a commissary kitchen for food trucks, and a childcare center. El Centro de la Raza opened their second project, Four Amigos in the Columbia City neighborhood, in 2025. The building has office space and 87 residential units, including three-bedroom units, designated for households with 30% to 60% of the area's median income.

The organization acquired a roller skating rink in Federal Way in 2022 as part of preparations for a new development and continues to operate the facility. In 2024, El Centro de la Raza and Mercy Housing Northwest were awarded the rights to redevelop a University of Washington laundry facility adjacent to Mount Baker station by the Seattle city government. The development is planned to include 431 mixed-income residential units in four buildings, each eight stories tall, with a childcare center and public plaza space. The project is anticipated to cost $152 million and was awarded $9.2 million in funding from the Washington State Department of Commerce. A seven-story building in Beacon Hill with 70 units and retail space began construction in 2025; it was financed with a bank loan, government funding, and donations from Amazon and Microsoft.
