= Roberto Maestas =

Latino activist

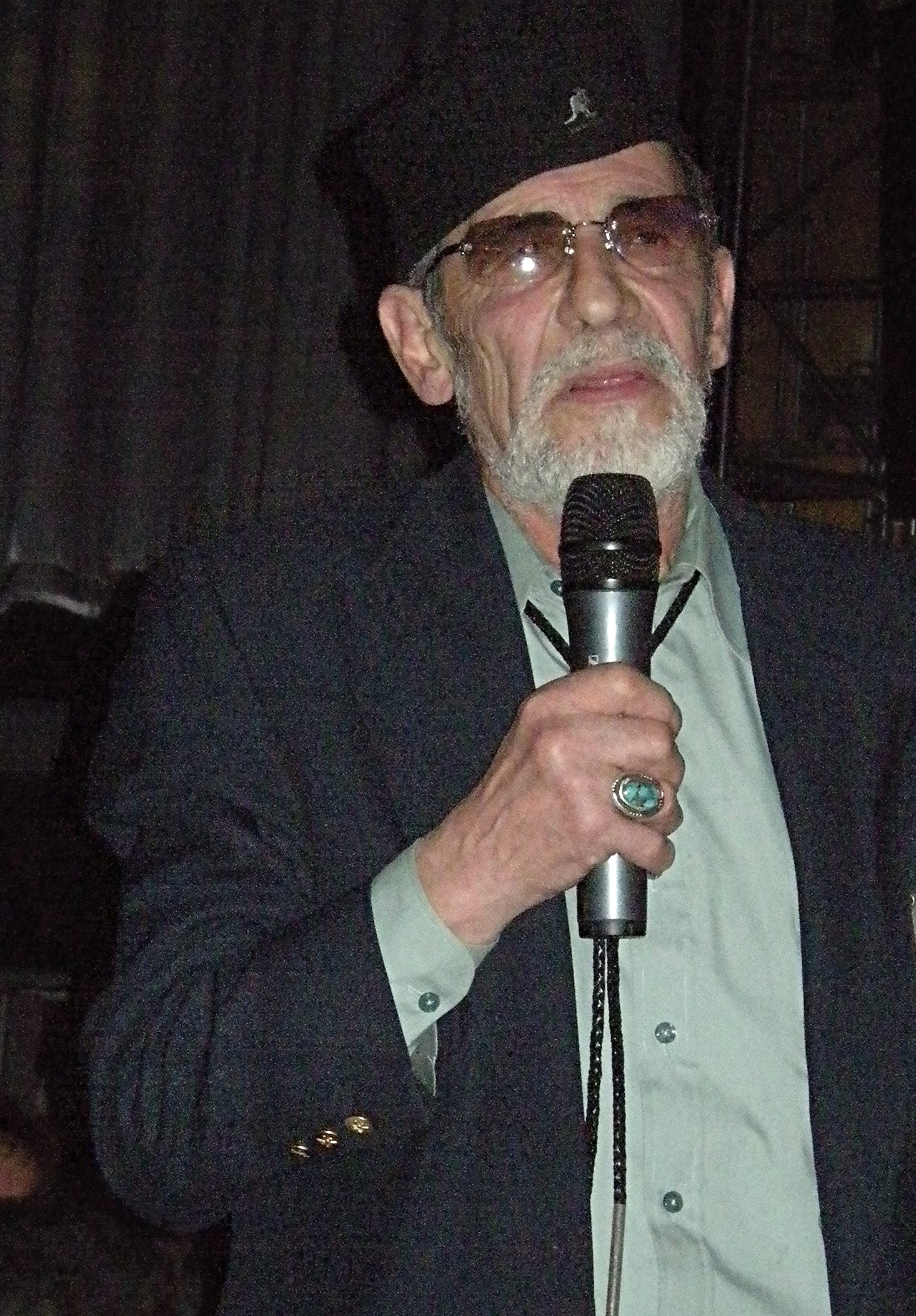
- Roberto Maestas, 2008

Personal details
- Born: July 9, 1938 New Mexico
- Died: September 22, 2010 (aged 72) Seattle, Washington
- Spouse(s): Janet Tassin, Estela Ortega
- Occupation: Social activist
- Known for: Community leader of Seattle

Roberto Maestas (July 9, 1938 – September 22, 2010) was an American social activist who was prominent between the 1960s and the 1990s in Seattle, Washington. Maestas was a member of the Gang of Four and one of the founders of El Centro de la Raza.

== Biography ==
Maestas was born in rural New Mexico and raised by his grandparents; his father had left the household before he was born, and his mother died of tuberculosis within a year of his birth. After they lost their subsistence farm in San Augustin del Valle de Nuestra Señora (near Las Vegas, New Mexico, the teenage Maestas worked as a migrant worker throughout the Western United States, and eventually settled in Seattle in the 1950s. In Seattle, he was one of the first Chicanos to attend Cleveland High School; he had to drop out to earn money, eventually receiving a high school diploma through an adult education program.

Maestas earned his bachelor's degree from the University of Washington in 1965 and became a high school teacher at Franklin High School. The school's racial tensions sparked his awareness of Seattle's racial and class divides, and he began participating in local organizing for the Civil Rights Movement, as well as protests against the Vietnam War.

Maestas enrolled in a graduate degree program back at the University of Washington in 1968, where he pushed to diversify the campus. He participated in Chicano student activism, the black freedom movement, and helping farm workers organize in the Yakima valley.

In the early 1970s he helped begin an ESL program at South Seattle College. In 1972, funding to the program was abruptly cut off which led to Maestas and a number of other activists to occupy an abandoned school building in Seattle's Beacon Hill neighborhood which eventually became El Centro de la Raza. As of 2026 his widow, Estela Ortega, is executive director of the organization.

With Bernie Whitebear, Larry Gossett, and Bob Santos of the Gang of Four, Maestas created the Minority Executive Director's coalition in 1982. By 2005, the organization coordinated the leaders of 120 nonprofits for minority communities, helping them organize funding.

== Legacy ==
Maestas was chosen as Seafair's King Neptune for 2004, a choice that surprised him and caused fellow activist Bob Santos to laugh uncontrollably. Maestas was the first Latino Seafair King, had never been to a Seafair Torchlight Parade, and disliked Seafair's use of the Blue Angels. Seafair's vice president said they selected him for his long history of community service, and Maestas said he would participate in honor of "the people". He took the role alongside Jeannie Nordstrom, of the Nordstrom family, as Queen Alcyone. Another activist, Reverend Samuel B. McKinney, had been chosen as King Neptune the year before. In 2007, Santos was selected as King Neptune as well.

Maestas, along with the rest of the Gang of Four and the executive director of the Minority Executive Directors Coalition, received the 2005 Bridge Builders Award from Partners for Livable Communities.

On April 25, 2011, the Seattle City Council voted unanimously to rename the segment of South Lander Street between 16th Avenue South and 17th Avenue South (immediately south of El Centro de la Raza) as South Roberto Maestas Festival Street.

There have been several attempts to rename El Centro de la Raza in his honor, all of them deflected by his widow, who is quite clear that "I know for a fact that he would not want that to happen."
