= Bob Santos (activist) =

Minority-rights activist

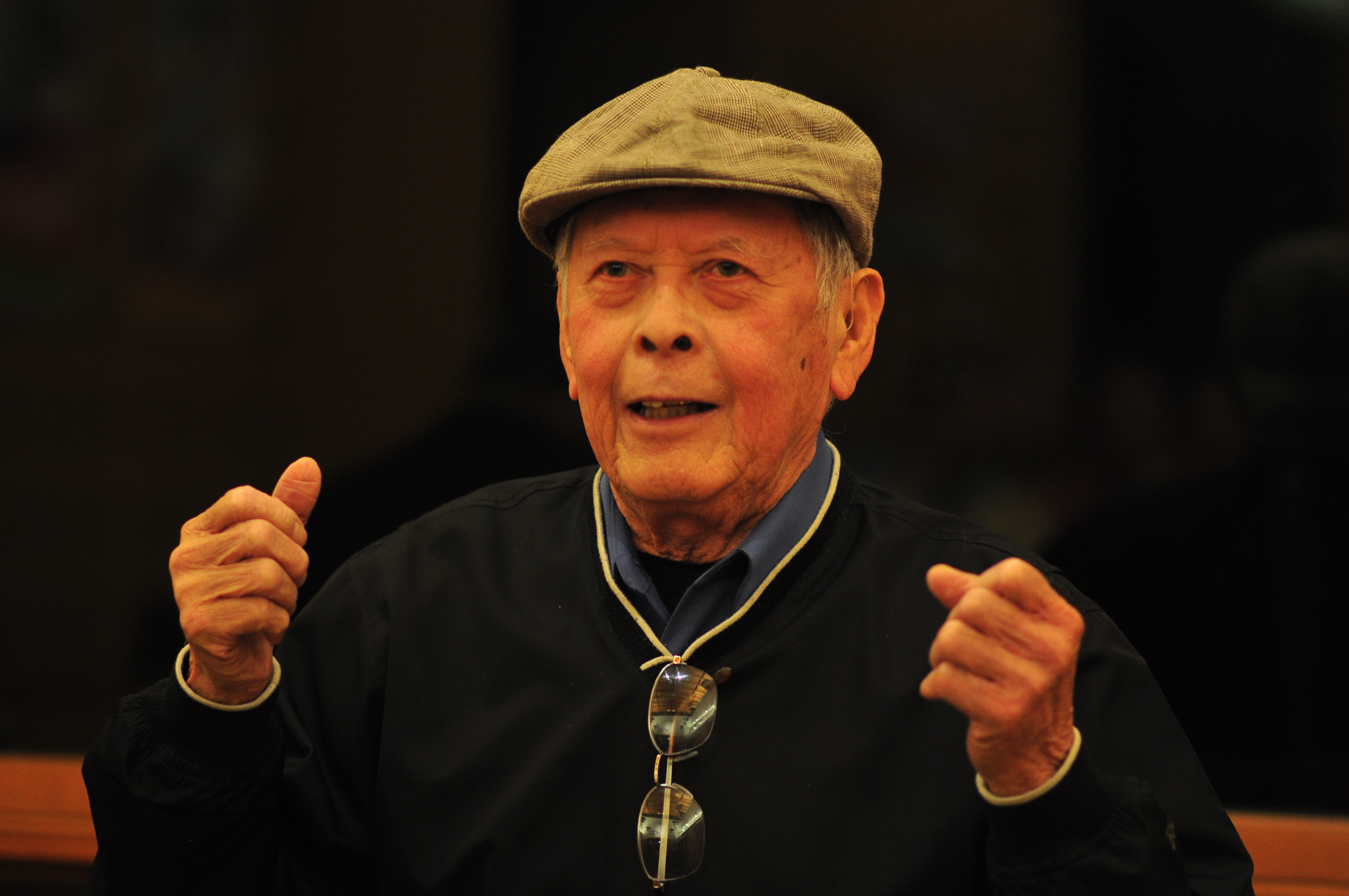
- Born: February 25, 1934; Seattle, Washington
- Died: August 27, 2016 (aged 82); Seattle, Washington
- Other name: "Uncle Bob"
- Spouse: Sharon Tomiko Santos

Bob Santos (February 25, 1934 – August 27, 2016) was an American minority-rights activist from Seattle who worked to preserve Seattle's Chinatown and International District (CID). Santos was a member of the Gang of Four and a prominent member of the Filipino American community of Seattle. He was involved in civil rights activism and mentorship, the creation of the Minority Executive Director's Coalition, the creation of InterIm, and the expansion of services for the CID.

== Early life ==
Robert Nicholas "Bob" Santos was born in the Chinatown-International District in Seattle, Washington on February 25, 1934. His parents were Virginia Nicol Santos and Marcario "Sammy" Santos, who married in 1931, and Bob's older brother Sammy Jr. was born in 1932.

Virginia was born around 1912. She was Indipino, the daughter of a Filipino Canadian lumber worker and a Native American-French Canadian. After her mother died, Virginia's family moved to Seattle. Virginia attended Broadway High School, then the University of Washington while working as a waitress at the Rizal Cafe. Sammy was born in 1902 in San Mateo, Rizal. The U.S. had annexed the Philippines in 1898, sparking warfare there, and Sammy joined the U.S. Navy in search of economic opportunity. Sammy then became a boxer in the U.S., adopting the name "Sockin' Sammy", and eventually moved to Seattle as a local celebrity.

In 1935, Virginia died from tuberculosis. Bob and Sammy Jr. were sent to live with different relatives, visiting their father on weekends at the Northern Pacific Hotel at 6th and Jackson. Sammy Sr. lived in the hotel until 1952, going blind in 1945 from his boxing injuries. Bob recalled that almost all of the hotel's occupants were men, mostly Filipinos. His father lived in a 9 by 13 foot room, and had many visitors, from prostitutes who dined with the family at dinnertime to drunk men grieving breakups or gambling losses. The family cooked on a hot plate in the room, and kept their belongings in the room's closet. Bob also lived with his aunt Toni and uncle Joe Adriatico in the Central District. Toni was heavily involved in charity work. Joe, a political refugee from the Philippines, discussed revolutionaries and unions with Bob, nurturing his political consciousness.

Santos attended Maryknoll School until it closed in 1942 because most of its students were Japanese American and they had all been incarcerated in concentration camps. Seeing other students disappear to these camps was an early influence for Santos' activism. Santos recalled that this was the first time he recognized racism around him, and he and other Filipino and Chinese Americans wore badges stating their ancestry to avoid assault by white people. He then switched to Immaculate Conception School, followed by O'Dea High School, graduating in 1952. In high school, Santos played sports, worked delivery and restaurant jobs, and spent two summers at an Alaska fish cannery. He experienced racism at O'Dea, where Filipino non-athletes were ostracized, and at the cannery, where white workers received better quarters and food than Filipinos did. Santos also learned about the strength of the Cannery Workers Union Local 7 to shape worker options.

Santos joined the U.S. Marines after graduation, returning to Seattle in 1955 to work as an engineer in Boeing's hammer shop. He later worked for the Knights of Columbus as an insurance salesman.

== Career ==
Santos later managed a construction supply company in Everett, Washington and coached students for the Presidential Fitness Test with the Knights of Columbus for over a decade.

=== Catholic civil rights activism ===
During the Civil Rights Movement, Seattle's archbishop, Thomas Connolly, promoted the involvement of local Catholic clergy. He supported Walter Hubbard's creation of the Catholic Interracial Council of Seattle, which was the church's unofficial civil rights organization. Hubbard and Santos were drinking buddies, and in the mid-1960s Hubbard invited Santos to join a council march to St. James Cathedral for open housing. At the time, houses in many Seattle neighborhoods had racial restrictive covenants banning them from being sold to people of color and Jews. Hubbard asked Santos to hold a banner for the march, and Santos said he was pleasantly surprised to find his photograph on the front page of a Catholic newspaper the next day. Santos began attending council meetings at the St. Peter Claver Center afterwards. This was the same building that had hosted his first elementary school, Maryknoll.

Santos continued to attend nonviolent civil rights demonstrations. He protested in marches against the sale of Class H liquor licenses to white-only clubs like the Rainier Club, Elks and Moose, and he joined the United Farm Workers' grape and lettuce boycott pickets outside Safeways. He joined Filipino-Americans Concerned for Equality and became a board member for Project Equality. In 1969, Santos was chosen to join Seattle's Human Rights Commission.

Hubbard became Santos' mentor in civil rights activism. Santos succeeded Hubbard as chair of Seattle's Catholic Interracial Council, elected in 1969, and later became the executive director of CARITAS (Community Action Remedial, Instruction, Tutoring Assistance and Service). CARITAS was a state-funded program for students in remedial classes to get one-on-one tutoring from college students and high school seniors. The program also met at the St. Peter Claver Center and served mostly Black students, as well as some Asian and white students. Santos managed the program from the center and visited schools to recruit tutors.

Eventually Father Harvey McIntyre, manager of the St. Peter Claver Center, asked Santos to manage the center's room rentals for different community groups. Santos offered free rooms to local civil rights groups, which fostered multiracial civil rights coordination. One of these was the free breakfast program run by the Black Panthers, headed by Aaron and Elmer Dixon. Other groups included Coalition Against Discrimination, Asian Coalition for Equality, United Farm Workers, Radical Women, and the Central Area Contractors Association, run by Tyree Scott.

=== InterIm and protests for the CID ===
By 1965, the Chinatown-International District, Seattle had high vacancy and crime rates and poor governmental support. Much of this was due to the city and state-level decision to build I-5 through the heart of the neighborhood in the 1950s. Residents of the CID vehemently opposed the decision but were ignored, and many businesses, homes, and churches were destroyed. Violent crime was frequent and Santos called the neighborhood a ghetto. By 1968, residents formed the International District Improvement Association (also known as InterIm or Inter*im) to revitalize the area. Santos joined the board in 1970 and served as executive director from 1972 to 1989.

As head of InterIm, Santos focused on supporting the residents of the CID, providing culturally aware services to residents, adding affordable housing, and supporting small businesses. He spent decades fighting gentrification and erosion of the CID and its community. After King County Council decided to build the Kingdome next to the CID in 1972, he joined community members in protesting and suing to stop the construction. Protestors argued that the stadium would force five nearby hotels to close, which housed many of the CID's Chinese immigrant families and elderly Filipino men. After a year of lawsuits and organizing, the neighborhood was not able to stop the construction, so they pivoted to pushing for social services and support for the neighborhood that had never previously existed, along with representation during the stadium's construction and management.

Santos led protests at the groundbreaking ceremony for the Kingdome on November 2, 1972, and days later more protestors marched from Hing Hay Park to the office of the U.S. Department of Housing and Urban Development, asking for neighborhood housing support. Some activists formed the Committee for Corrective Action and marched to the office of John Spellman, the King County Executive, with a list of demands that he verbally agreed to. Santos also attended Seattle City Council hearings with Elaine Ko, Nemesio Domingo, and Mayumi Tsutakawa. In Santos' first statement, on September 9, 1975, he argued that the city needed to support affordable housing, health, and public services for the CID, concluding that "if we fall victim once again to the blind racist economics, the opportunity to preserve this unique part of the City will be lost to all of us forever."

Spellman followed up on some of the activist demands, starting the process of researching healthcare needs in the CID, which led to funding for the volunteer-run Asian Community Health Clinic. It was able to move into a one-room space across from Hing Hay Park, and grew into the present-day International Community Health Services organization. Spellman also appointed Santos to the hiring committee for the Kingdome's manager, and Santos played a key role in selecting Ted Bowsfield. The CID also added key services in this time with some support from various levels of local government, including a legal clinic, community center, food bank, and other food services. Santos helped locate the space for the health clinic, recruiting architect Joey Ing to design the space, and later supported the Asian Counseling and Referral Service.

=== Advocacy ===
In 1974, Santos and InterIm clashed with King County Councilwoman Ruby Chow and the Chong Wa Benevolent Association. They had different visions of the CID, coming to a head over their plans to create a Preservation and Development Authority for the neighborhood. Santos envisioned a multicultural coalition across the Asian American communities in the neighborhood, and InterIm drafted plans for a new International District Preservation and Development Authority (PDA). Chow had always referred to the area as Chinatown, and argued for the same group's creation under the name of the Chinatown PDA. Seattle chose to create the group under a merged name, but Santos eventually decided to run against Chow for her council seat in 1984. Chow instead stepped down for that race, and Ron Sims gained the seat, becoming the first Black elected county official in Washington. However, Santos ran the Seattle Chinatown/International District PDA from 1989 to 1993.

Santos continued to focus on development and support for the CID. He worked on parking issues, child care, and historic preservation and development. He led successful campaigns to block the addition of a McDonald's to the neighborhood, as well as a prison and a garbage-burning plant. Santos became known as the unofficial mayor of the CID for his dedication to the neighborhood.

Santos also cultivated organizing connections across communities in Seattle. He formed the Gang of Four with Bernie Whitebear, Larry Gossett, and Roberto Maestas, and mentored younger Asian American activists as "Uncle Bob". The Gang of Four planned direct actions in the pursuit of housing, employment, education, and healthcare equality. Santos often joked that the Gang of Four and their fellow protestors "were really good at occupying buildings": these sit-ins directly led to the creation of El Centro de la Raza and the Daybreak Star Cultural Center. The Gang of Four felt that working together to create support across different communities was a powerful method for forcing city officials to take their demands seriously, because the usual strategy of those in power was to divide people by race. Because the four men were best friends and activist leaders for their communities, they were able to coordinate effective protest campaigns against Seattle's white community structures from the 1960s until the 1980s.

The Gang of Four created the Minority Executive Director's Coalition in 1982. The coalition helps coordinate funding for social services, and by 2005 coordinated the leaders of 120 nonprofits serving minority communities.

He worked as regional director of the United States Department of Housing and Urban Development from 1994 to 2001.

== Personal life ==
Santos met Anita Agbalog at Boeing: they married in 1956 and had six children. In 1992, he married Sharon Tomiko Santos who was elected to the Washington House of Representatives in 1998.

Santos sang karaoke at Bush Garden, perhaps the first karaoke bar in the U.S., every Tuesday. People used this time as office hours for him, to ask for advice and favors. Tuesdays reportedly became known as "Bob Santos' Night".

Santos was also known for wearing a panama hat.

== Legacy ==
The Gang of Four and the executive director of the Minority Executive Directors Coalition received the 2005 Bridge Builders Award from Partners for Livable Communities.

Santos was chosen as Seafair's King Neptune in 2007, alongside Mona Locke as Queen Alcyone. When Santos' fellow activist Roberto Maestas had been chosen as an outsider King Neptune in 2004, Santos had laughed uncontrollably before Maestas decided to take the role for the sake of "the people".

InterIm CDA built an affordable housing complex called Uncle Bob's Place, which his family named after him in his honor. his son John Santos created the building's logo.

After Bush Garden closed in 2021, Karen Akada Sakata, its owner, decided to move it into the first floor of Uncle Bob's Place. InterIm CDA designed a panama hat to mount on Bush Garden's relocated sign, and it was created by Haskett Works for a December 2025 mounting. The hat was placed in honor of Santos' history of advocacy for the neighborhood and his devotion to karaoke and meetings at Bush Garden.

== Works ==
- Santos, Bob; Iwamoto, Gary (June 16, 2015). The Gang of Four: Four Leaders, Four Communities, One Friendship. Chin Music Press Inc. ISBN 978-1634059527.
- Santos, Bob (September 8, 2018). Hum Bows, Not Hot Dogs: Memoirs of a Savvy Asian American Activist (2nd ed.). Chin Music Press Inc. ISBN 978-1634050050.
