= John Hurst Adams =

American activist and pastor (1927–2018)

Bishop John Hurst Adams
- Born: November 27, 1927
- Died: January 10, 2018 (aged 90)
- Education: Johnson C. Smith University, BA; Boston University School of Theology, MA
- Occupation: Pastor
- Years active: 1956-2005

John Hurst Adams (November 27, 1927 - January 10, 2018) was an American civil rights activist and Bishop in the African Methodist Episcopal Church. He also served as a college president.

== Early life and education ==
Adams was born on November 27, 1927, in Columbia, South Carolina. His father, Eugene Adams, was a reverend in the African Methodist Episcopal Church and a civil rights activist active in Columbia's Black community. Adams attended Booker T. Washington High School, and earned a Bachelor's in History from Johnson C. Smith University, graduating in 1947. While an undergraduate student, Adams served as chapter president of Alpha Phi Alpha fraternity. Adams completed his postgraduate education at the Boston University School of Theology, where he met Martin Luther King Jr. He also briefly attended Harvard University and Union Theological Seminary. His eldest sister, Charity Adams Earley was the first African-American woman to become an officer in the Women's Army Auxiliary Corps.

== Career ==
In 1956, Adams was made president of Paul Quinn College, a position he held for six years. While president of the college, Adams lived in Waco and quickly became a target of the local branch of the Ku Klux Klan. Waco was where Adams began his civil rights activism in earnest. He supported students in their protest efforts and engaged in them himself, participating in sit-ins and marching on picket lines. Despite being re-appointed as president, in 1962 he moved to Seattle, accepting a position as lead pastor of First African Methodist Episcopal Church.

=== Civil rights activism in Seattle ===
While in Seattle, Adams acted as chairman of the Central Area Civil Rights Committee, a group dedicated to promoting civil rights in Seattle. In that role, he advocated for an open housing ordinance to ban housing discrimination in the city. On June 24, 1963, he, Samuel B. McKinney, and Mance Jackson spoke to Seattle's clergymen at a meeting in the Mount Zion Baptist Church, committing many in the audience to join a march for the ordinance. Days later, 84 religious leaders in the city issued a strong statement in support of the civil rights movement. Seattle City Council ultimately recommended the policy be voted on by the people, where it lost by a two-to-one margin.

Beginning in 1963, Adams committed to desegregating Seattle Public Schools, attending every Seattle School Board meeting to talk about the de facto segregation of Seattle schools and how Brown v. Board of Education prohibited this. Frances Owen, past head of the school board, was not sure how Adams changed their minds, but attributed their eventual decision in favor of integration to Adams wearing them down and convincing them that something had to change.

He also helped found the Central Area Motivation Program (CAMP), the first government agency explicitly created as part of Lyndon B. Johnson's War on Poverty. CAMP aimed at providing support services, job training, and university recruitment options. It hired and trained hundreds of unemployed people to remodel old homes in the Central District. By 2013, then named Centerstone, it had become the oldest independent organization created for the war on poverty.

=== Bishop and activist ===
In 1968 Adams was transferred to a church in Los Angeles where he served for four years. In 1972, he was elected a bishop and appointed to the Tenth Episcopal District in Texas. While there, Adams returned to Paul Quinn College to serve as the chairman of the board of trustees. In 1980 Adams became Bishop of the Second Episcopal District in Washington, D.C. He founded the Congress of National Black Churches, a coalition of historically African-American denominations, in 1982 and acted as its first chairman. The organization had a collective membership of seventeen million members across seven denominations. In D.C. he renewed his activism, protesting Ronald Reagan's military budget and organizing voter registration drives across the country.

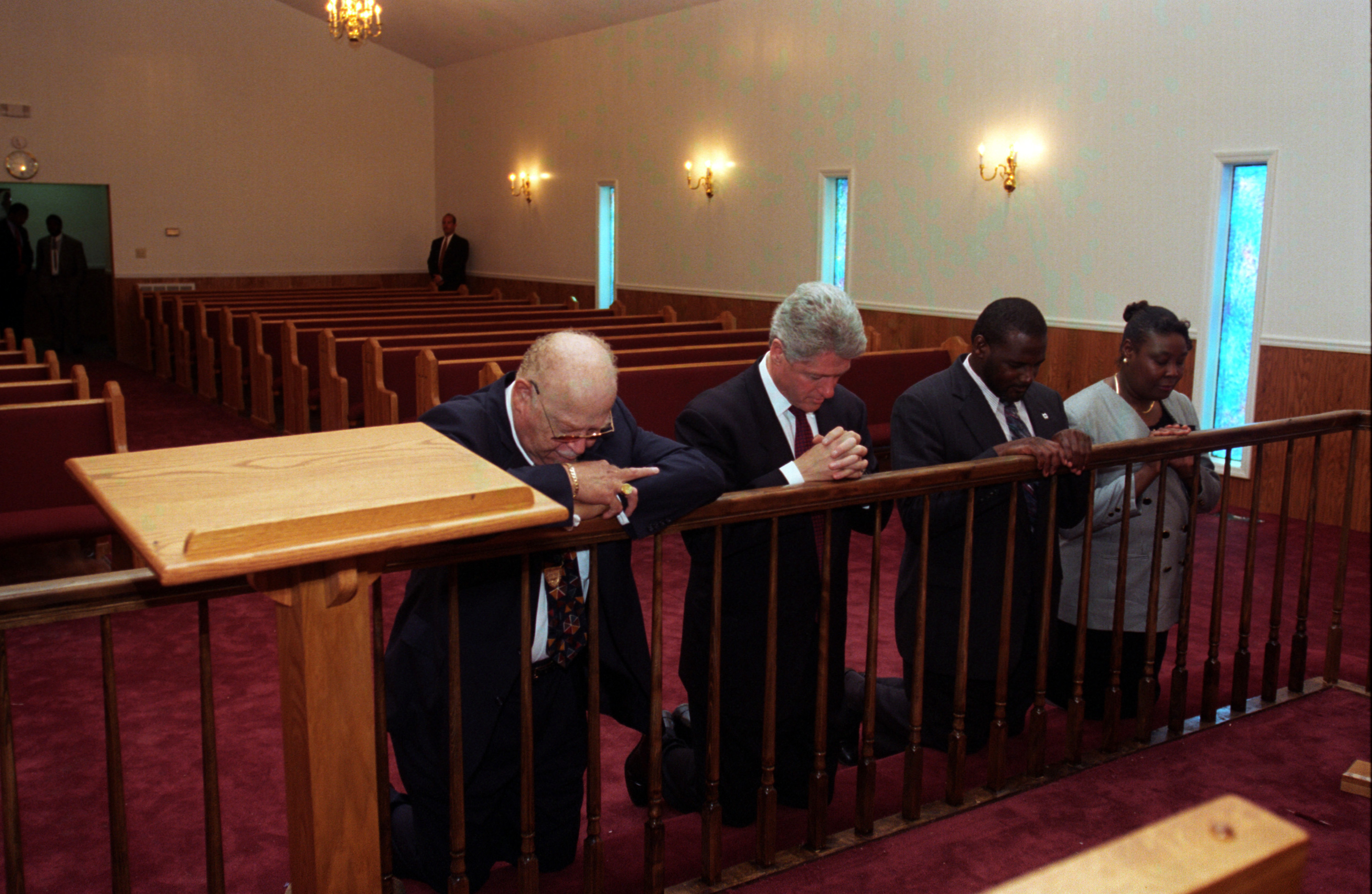
Adams (left) praying with Bill Clinton in 1996

In 1988 he began serving as Bishop for the Sixth Episcopal District, in Georgia. He was a heavy critic of Ralph Abernathy's 1989 book And the Walls Came Tumbling Down, which made controversial claims about Martin Luther King Jr.'s private life. In 1992 Adams was named Bishop of the Seventh Episcopal District in South Carolina. The following year, he was ranked alongside Jesse Jackson as one of the top Black preachers in the United States by Ebony and advocated against Bill Clinton's endorsement of Chuck Robb in his Senate campaign. In 1994, he began speaking out against the South Carolina State House's flying of the Confederate battle flag, working with the NAACP and Christian interdenominational groups to organize a protest at the State House against the flag. On the subject of the flag, Adams said that it "says the same thing to me that the swastika says to my Jewish brothers." The group accepted a compromise which would move the flag from the dome of the capitol to a less visible place, however, the compromise did not go into effect. Adams continued his activism through the end of his of time in South Carolina.

Adam's final placement as Bishop was made in 2000, when he transferred to the Eleventh Episcopal District in Florida. He retired in 2005 and returned to his hometown of Columbia, South Carolina.

== Later life and death ==
Adams and his wife had three children. After his retirement, Adams became a professor at Emory University. He died on January 10, 2018, in Atlanta. His grandson Malcolm Brogdon is a professional basketball player for the Washington Wizards.
