= Lawney Reyes =

American Sin-Aikst artist (1931–2022)

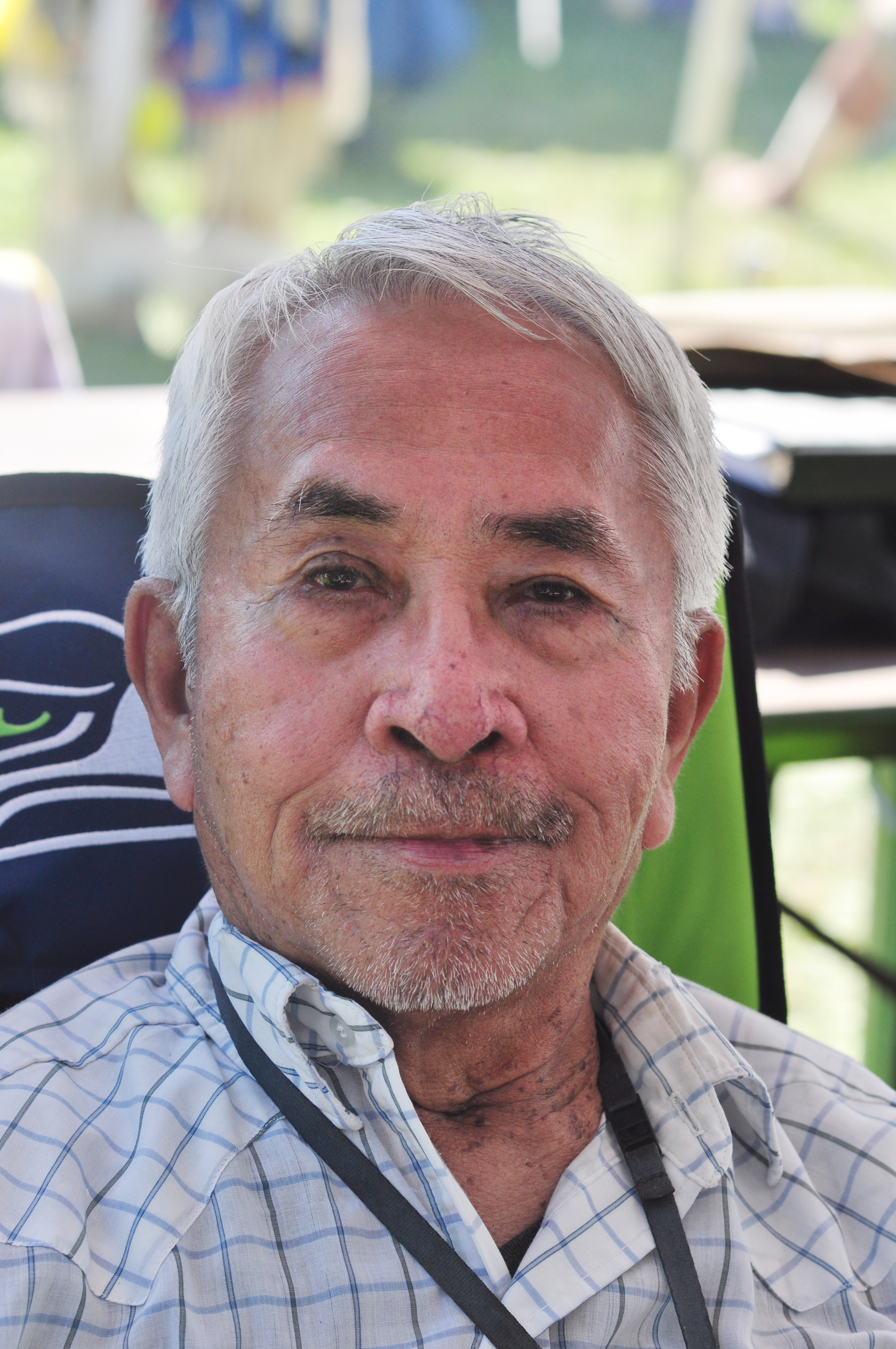
- Reyes in 2016
- Born: 1931; Bend, Oregon, U.S.
- Died: August 10, 2022 (aged 91)

Detail from Reyes' 1972 sculpture Blue Jay.The eye of the blue jay, depicted here — a roughly 0.25 meter detail in this 9.15 meter-wide sculpture — is a depiction of a bear holding a white man, in tribute to Reyes' activist brother, Bernie Whitebear. The sculpture is modeled on Coast Salish tradition, although Reyes and Whitebear were (inland) Sin-Aikst.

Reyes' Dreamcatcher sculpture, installed at 32nd Avenue and Yesler Way in Seattle, is a public memorial to his brother Bernie Whitebear and sister Luana Reyes. The sculpture also relates to cultural diffusion among Native American tribes/nations. As noted on the plaque, dreamcatchers are originally an Ojibwa cultural artifact, but have now been adopted by Native Americans throughout the United States and Canada.

Lawney L. Reyes (1931 – August 10, 2022) was an American Sin-Aikst artist, curator, and memoirist, based in Seattle, Washington.

== Biography ==
Lawney Reyes was born in 1931 to Mary Christian, Sin-Aikst (now known as the Sinixt). Historically her people were known as the Senjextee ("the Lake") and they now make up one of the Confederated Tribes of the Colville Reservation. His father was Julian Reyes, a native Filipino who largely assimilated to an Indian way of life after his marriage. Lawney's maternal grandfather, Alex Christian, was known as Pic Ah Kelowna, (White Grizzly Bear); his great-uncle (brother of his maternal grandmother) was Chief James Bernard, a Sin Aikst leader in the early 20th century. Lawney's siblings included Luana Reyes and Bernie Whitebear.

Reyes' early childhood with his family was largely lived on the Colville Indian Reservation in Washington. In 1935–1937, during the period of construction of the Grand Coulee Dam, his parents moved to Grand Coulee and started a Chinese restaurant, even though "[n]either of them could prepare Chinese food except for simple dishes such as pork fried rice, egg foo-yung, and chop suey". They soon acquired an ethnically Chinese partner and cook, Harry Wong whom later bought them out of the restaurant in 1937. His parents separated in 1939 and subsequently divorced. His mother later worked again for Wong in Tacoma, Washington and she eventually married Wong.

From 1940 to 1942, Reyes was a student at the Chemawa Indian School, a boarding school five miles north of Salem, Oregon. He would later write that his consciousness of being "Indian" was largely formed through his conversations there with other students. The rest of his childhood and youth was spent living with his father, variously on the Colville Reservation and in Okanogan, Washington.

After graduating from Okanogan High School in 1949, Reyes moved to Tacoma, Washington, where he lived again with his mother and her second husband. He moved back east across the mountains and attended the Wenatchee Junior College, where he obtained a two-year degree. He met Joyce Meacham, a Yakama and Warm Springs Indian and they were married in 1955. She later had a career in social work and especially in Indian Health programs.

Reyes served in the U.S. Army which gave him the opportunity to see much of Europe which confirmed his interest in working in a field related to "architecture design, and art". Upon his return he attended the University of Washington, studying painting and sculpture and majoring in interior design. He graduated in 1959.

He worked for Seafirst Bank, initially as a designer, eventually collecting and curating the Seafirst Corporate Art Collection. During this time, he also used his nights and weekends to work at sculpture (mainly in wood) and as a freelance interior designer.

He took early retirement from Seafirst Bank in 1984, and traveled North America visiting various Indian tribes. He wrote two books, his memoir White Grizzly Bear's Legacy: Learning to be Indian (2002), and a biography of his brother Bernie Whitebear: An Urban Indian's Quest for Justice.

=== Death ===
Reyes died on August 10, 2022, at the age of 91.

== Writings ==
Reyes' 2002 memoir White Grizzly Bear's Legacy: Learning to be Indian combines his own memories and research with notes from library and field research (including taped interviews) done by his mother before her death in a traffic accident in May 1978. Among other things, it describes traditional tribal fishing at Kettle Falls on the Columbia River and living in Inchelium, Washington at its old site. Both Kettle Falls and Old Inchelium were later flooded by the rising waters after the construction of Grand Coulee Dam. His book also described the forced changes of life for the Sin Aikst/Lakes as conditions forced them away from traditional patterns and how they worked to preserve elements of their traditions. He explored the ambiguous effect of institutions such as the Chemawa Indian School circa 1940, which simultaneously acculturated natives to the majority American culture while inspiring a sense of "Indianness," rather than affiliation with only individual tribes.

His second book, Bernie Whitebear: An Urban Indian's Quest for Justice (2006), is a biography of his brother Bernie Whitebear (1937–2000). He was one of the so-called "Gang of Four" or "Four Amigos" who founded Seattle's Minority Executive Directors' Coalition.

Reyes' third book, B Street: A Gathering of Saints and Sinners (2008), is an exploration of the Grand Coulee area between 1933 and 1941, during the construction of the Dam. It was published by the University of Washington Press.

== Sculpture and design ==
Reyes' works are prominent in Seattle. He helped design the Daybreak Star Cultural Center at Fort Lawton in the Magnolia section of Seattle. His sculpture Blue Jay (which measures 30 feet (9 m) wide and 12 feet (3.7 m) high) was hung prominently for over 30 years at the Bank of California building in downtown Seattle. After a bank merger in 2004, the piece was transferred to the Daybreak Star Center. His Dreamcatcher, installed at the corner of 32nd Avenue and Yesler Way in Seattle, honors the memory of his brother Bernie and his sister Luana. He also designed the logo for the Seattle Indian Health Board.

== Awards and honors ==
- Commissioner of the Seattle Arts Commission and a member of the (Washington) Governor's Task Force for the state's arts appropriation budget.
- Washington State Arts Commission Governor's Arts Award in 1971.

== Bibliography ==
- White Grizzly Bear's Legacy: Learning to be Indian, University of Washington Press, 2002. ISBN 0-295-98202-0.
- Bernie Whitebear: An Urban Indian's Quest for Justice, University of Arizona, 2006. ISBN 0-8165-2521-8. ISBN 978-0-8165-2521-8.
- B Street: A Gathering of Saints and Sinners, University of Washington Press, 2008. ISBN 978-0-295-98853-5.

== Notes ==
=== Sources ===
- Lawney Reyes, Seattle Civil Rights and Labor History Project, University of Washington. Includes extensive video of interviews with Reyes.
