= Bernie Whitebear =

American Indian activist

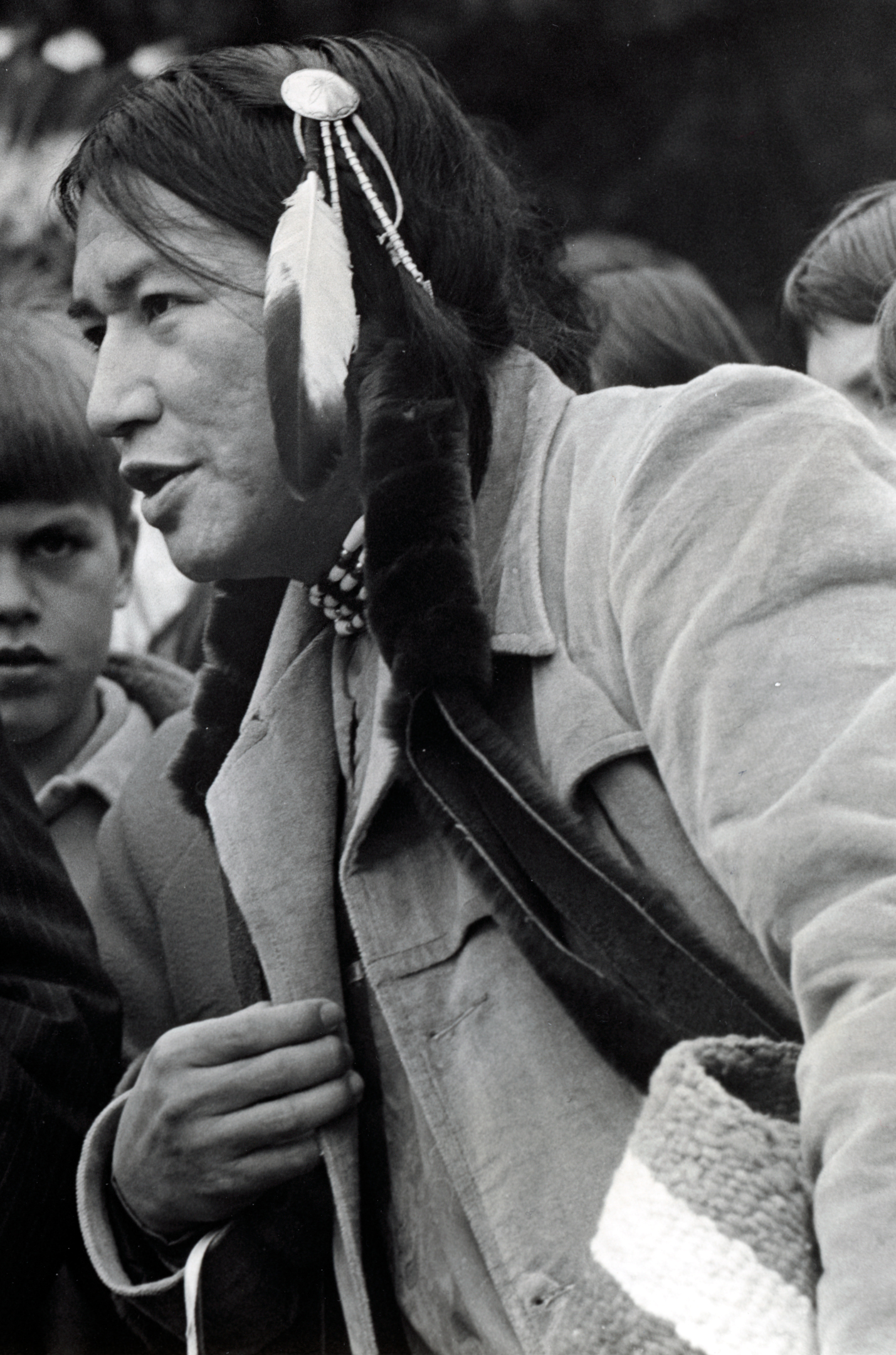
- Whitebear in 1971
- Born: Bernard Reyes; September 27, 1937; Nespelem, Washington
- Died: July 16, 2000 (aged 62)
- Occupation: Activist
- Known for: American Indian activism
- Spouse: Jessica King
- Children: 6

Bernie Whitebear (September 27, 1937 – July 16, 2000), birth name Bernard Reyes, was an American Indian activist in Seattle, Washington, a co-founder of the Seattle Indian Health Board (SIHB), the United Indians of All Tribes Foundation, and the Daybreak Star Cultural Center, established on 20 acres of land acquired for urban Indians in the city.

== Youth ==
He was born Bernard Reyes to Mary Christian (Sin Aikst, now known as Lakes tribe, one of the Confederated Tribes of the Colville Reservation) and Julian Reyes, a Filipino who largely assimilated to an Indian way of life. Born in the Colville Indian Hospital in Nespelem, Washington, the young Reyes was named "Bernard" after a great-uncle (brother of his maternal grandmother), Chief James Bernard, a Sin Aikst leader in the early 20th century. Around 1970, as Reyes became an activist, he changed his name to honor his mother's father, Alex Christian, known as Pic Ah Kelowna (White Grizzly Bear).

His early childhood was spent largely on the Colville Indian Reservation in Washington. His parents separated in 1939 and subsequently divorced; his mother would later marry Harry Wong, with whom she and Bernie's father had run a Chinese restaurant in 1935–1937, during the construction of the Grand Coulee Dam. While his older brother Lawney Reyes and sister Luana Reyes went away to attend boarding school, Chemawa Indian School in 1940–1942, Bernard was too young to do so. He lived with foster grandparents, the Halls.

For the rest of his childhood and youth, Reyes lived with his father, variously on the Colville Reservation and in Okanogan, Washington, where he graduated from high school in 1955. Being from a musically inclined family, Reyes took up the trumpet. He eventually advanced to lead trumpet of the Okanogan High School band. He was popular in his otherwise all-white high school, although some of his classmates' parents didn't approve of them socializing with (or, especially, dating) an Indian.

After attending one year of classes at the University of Washington, Reyes lived with his mother in Tacoma, Washington for about a year. There he first met, and fished with, Bob Satiacum, another Native American. Drift netting for salmon in Tacoma's Commencement Bay and the rivers that fed into it, they were repeatedly harassed by white sport fishermen and the Coast Guard. In September 1957 Reyes enlisted in the United States Army, where he served in the 101st Airborne Division as a Green Beret paratrooper.

== Forging a contemporary Indian identity ==
After leaving the army in 1959 and returning to the Seattle-Tacoma area of Washington State, Reyes took a job at Boeing, the major employer, and remained in the Army Reserve. He soon changed his name to "Bernie Whitebear" and renewed his friendship with Satiacum and others who were fighting for native fishing rights on the Puyallup River and elsewhere in Western Washington. They had these rights affirmed in the United States Supreme Court ruling known as the Boldt Decision (1974), which made the Washington's tribes co-managers of the state's fisheries.

Through the fishing rights struggle, Whitebear developed a deeper sense of historic conflicts between Indians and the white population than he had attained growing up around Okanogan. During this period, the struggle over the rights to fish for salmon occasionally reached the level of physical violence. Satiacum was prominent among those who continually upped the ante, deliberately netting fish in places where he knew it would provoke anger from sports fishermen. According to his brother and biographer Lawney Reyes, Whitebear, Satiacum, and a few other of their friends "spent a lot of time together partying and drinking" and styled themselves as a "fraternal organization" called the "Skins", with three Tacoma taverns as their "lodges". "When the Skins gathered," Reyes wrote, "others gave them a wide berth." According to the older Lawney Reyes, through this period, Whitebear was "learning much about the problems of urban Indians" and developing an anger that he would soon put to constructive use. Through the early 1960s, Whitebear began searching for a way to change the dominant American culture's perception of Indians. He also wanted to support the recovery and retention of culture that was becoming lost as Indians adapted to a changing world and sometimes lost specific tribal knowledge and traditions.

In the summer of 1961, along with his various family members, Whitebear raised opposition to a federal government proposal to "terminate" the relationship of the federally recognized Colville Reservation. Under the termination program, the government proposed to pay US$60,000 to each tribal member to relinquish their rights as American Indians. The reservation would be disbanded and the tribal members essentially assimilated to majority culture.

== Pow wows and performances ==
As early as 1961, Whitebear organized a pow-wow at Seattle's Masonic Temple; in 1966 he moved to the city. Throughout this period, he retained his job at Boeing (and even played Sitting Bull in a Boeing employees' production of Annie Get Your Gun.) He also became involved with young Indians in learning the songs and dances of the Plateau Indians (including the Colville), and those of the Plains, as well as more about specific tribes. Whitebear tracked down Indians knowledgeable in these various traditions, and he taught himself many of the traditional songs and dances of Native cultures.

In 1968, Whitebear put together a Native American dance group to tour Southeastern Europe along with the Balkan-style Koleda Dance Ensemble. They later made a second trip, performing in France and Germany. According to his brother Reyes, Whitebear's experiences in Europe helped him "realize his calling in life", to "make Indians more visible to white people" and to help "the various tribes… forge a united front."

After returning home, Whitebear organized a series of pow wows larger than any that Seattle had ever seen, to take place at the Mercer Arena at Seattle Center. He brought together some of the leading singers, dancers, and drummers of Plateau and Plains traditions, as well as of the regional Northwest Coast Indians.

== Activist and leader ==
During this same period, Whitebear became particularly interested in health issues among Seattle's Indians. At this time, Seattle's estimated 25,000 urban Indians had "no health services, no organization, no money and no meeting place except an old church on Boren Avenue". Alaskan Native Bob Lupson had helped to organize a free clinic for Indian People at Seattle's Public Health Hospital (later the Pacific Medical Center); other key figures in the clinic were Lyle Griffith, an Oglala Sioux who was then a medical resident at the University of Washington, and his wife Donna Griffith, and later New Yorkers Peter and Hinda Schnurman, Jill Marsden from England, and pharmacist Eveline Takahashi.

Whitebear left Boeing to help operate the clinic. In 1969 it established itself as a separate non-profit, the Seattle Indian Health Board (SIHB). In 1970, Whitebear became the group's first executive director. Lawney Reyes characterizes the SIHB as "the first major achievement for the Indian community in Seattle," and said that his brother became executive director not because he knew anything in particular about healthcare but "because he was Indian and well spoken." Jill Marsden increasingly acted as the true administrator of the group. After about a year Whitebear resigned, in order to focus on acquiring a land base for Seattle's urban Indians.

After a national search, Luana Reyes, Whitebear's sister, was hired as executive director after a business career in San Francisco. Over the next decade, she developed SIHB as a 200-employee institution recognized as a national model. She was later appointed as the deputy director of the federal Indian Health Service (a political appointee position).

Shortly after this, Whitebear became deeply involved in a movement for Seattle Indians to acquire a share of the land to be declared surplus at Fort Lawton, as the government downsized this army post. The group was influenced by the Indians of All Tribes (IAT), a mostly student group of activists who had occupied Alcatraz Island, site of a federal prison, in San Francisco Bay. Initially, the Seattle movement called themselves Kinatechitapi, Blackfoot for "All Indians". Their first efforts to open discussions with the City of Seattle in advance of the turnover of the land failed. The City said it would not open discussions until it acquired the land, and referred them to the Bureau of Indian Affairs (BIA). As Whitebear later wrote, "This action displayed their ignorance of both the BIA's restricted service policy, which excluded urban Indians, and also the disregard and disfavor urban Indians held for the BIA."

The Kinatechitapi split between a faction that called for direct action and one that preferred to wait until the land was in city hands and then attempt negotiation. Prominent among those who preferred to wait was Pearl Warren, founder of the American Indian Women's Service League, who was concerned that a militant attitude would undercut the existing city-funded services. It was peaceably agreed that those who wished to take more extreme action would not use the name "Kinatechitapi", but the resulting tensions led to Warren losing the next election for the Service League presidency to Joyce Reyes.

The more militant faction soon adopted the name "American Indian Fort Lawton Occupation Forces". Some of the Indians of All Tribes came in from Alcatraz, including Richard Oakes, leader of that action; other activists came from Canada. A plan was formed to invade the base. Another arrival was Grace Thorpe, daughter of athlete Jim Thorpe. Meanwhile, ongoing protests around nearby Fort Lewis, including by American Indian soldiers, were tying native rights to opposition to the Vietnam War. At the behest of the Fort Lewis coalition, Jane Fonda was in town when the invasion took place. According to Whitebear, her presence "captured the imagination of the world press. American Indians were attacking active military forts along with one of the nation's leading opponents of United States involvement in the Vietnam War." Her presence transformed "an effort to secure a land base for urban Indians" into "a bizarre, ready-for-prime-time, movie scenario, complete with soldiers, modern-day Indians, and anti-war activists. Without really appreciating it at the time, the Indian movement had achieved, through Jane Fonda's presence, a long-sought credibility which would not have been possible otherwise."

On March 8, 1970, Whitebear was among the leaders of about 100 "Native Americans and sympathizers" who confronted military police in riot gear at the fort. The MPs ejected them from the fort, but they were able to establish an encampment outside the fort. Organizing as the United Indians of All Tribes Foundation (UIATF), they used tactics ranging from politicking to occupation of land to celebrity appearances. Some of the key politicking came at the federal level: UIATF, like the city, filed to directly acquire land that the federal government was releasing, and the federal government ultimately insisted that the two come up with a joint plan. Negotiations, confrontation and even a Congressional intervention combined in November 1971 to give them a 99-year lease on 20 acres (81,000 m^{2}) in what would become Seattle's Discovery Park, with options for renewal without renegotiation. In addition, the City gave $600,000 to the American Indian Women's Service League for a social services center.

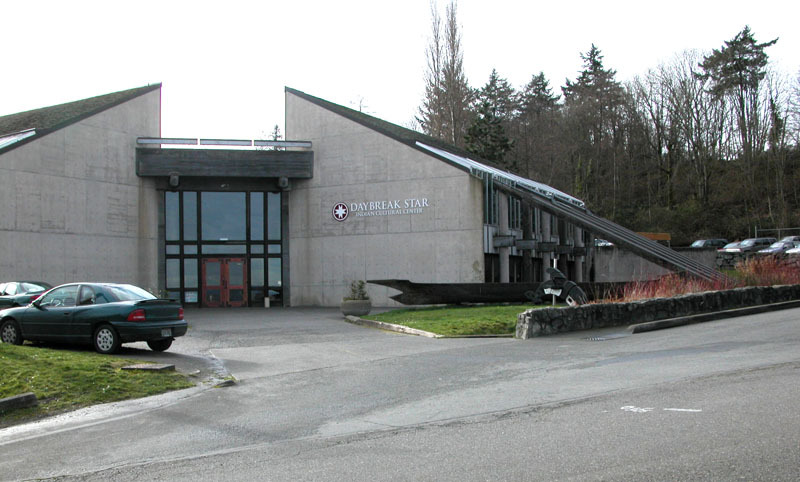
Daybreak Star Cultural Center

Whitebear was soon elected CEO of the UIATF. At UIATF, he successfully oversaw fundraising (including a million dollar grant from the state) and construction for what would become the Daybreak Star Cultural Center. His brother Lawney Reyes, a sculptor and designer — joined with architects Arai Jackson to design the facility, which opened in 1977. Reyes later became a curator of art and author, writing a personal memoir and a biography of his brother (Bernie Whitebear: An Urban Indian's Quest for Justice, 2006).

Along with Bob Santos, Roberto Maestas, and Larry Gossett, Whitebear became one of Seattle's so-called "Gang of Four" or "Four Amigos" who founded Seattle's Minority Executive Directors's Coalition. He continued to build the UIATF as an institution, with programs ranging from the La-ba-te-yah youth home in the Crown Hill neighborhood to the Sacred Circle Art Gallery at Daybreak Star. The center also operated a pre-school, family support programs, and sponsored a large annual pow-wow every July. It supports a "social-service agency with more than 100 staffers, an annual budget of $4 million, and eight federally funded programs serving Indians - infants to elderly." In addition, UIATF has acquired other land in Seattle outside Daybreak Star, including a quarter-block downtown at Second and Cherry.

In the same era when Daybreak Star was being constructed, Whitebear served on the Seattle Arts Commission. In 1995, he was appointed to the board of the National Museum of the American Indian, and was involved in the planning for the new museum that opened September 21, 2004 on the National Mall in Washington, D.C.

Whitebear died of colon cancer, July 16, 2000.

== Personal life ==
Whitebear married Jessica King. He had six children. Marilyn Sieber of the Nit Nat tribe was his "constant companion" for more than a decade in the 1970s and '80s, and the two were at one point engaged. He acted like a parent to "every Indian kid in Seattle", according to his brother. He gave away most money that came his way to those he considered needier, sometimes borrowing money from his siblings to do so.

== Legacy and honors ==
- In 1997 Washington governor Gary Locke declared Whitebear to be the state's first "Citizen of the Decade." After Whitebear's death he said Whitebear should have been designated as citizen "of the Century". Activist and author Vine Deloria, Jr. called him the most important Indian of the last century.
- In 2000 Whitebear's death was front-page news in the Seattle Times and Seattle Post-Intelligencer. The Times ran front-page stories on him for two successive days.
- The Bernie Whitebear Memorial Ethnobotanical Garden was established in his honor next to the Daybreak Star Cultural Center.
- Lawney Reyes memorialized Whitebear and his sister Luana in the public sculpture Dreamcatcher, at the corner of Yesler Way and 32nd Street in Seattle.
- The eleventh floor of King County's Chinook Building, completed in 2008 at Fifth and Jefferson, was named in his honor.
