= United Indians of All Tribes =

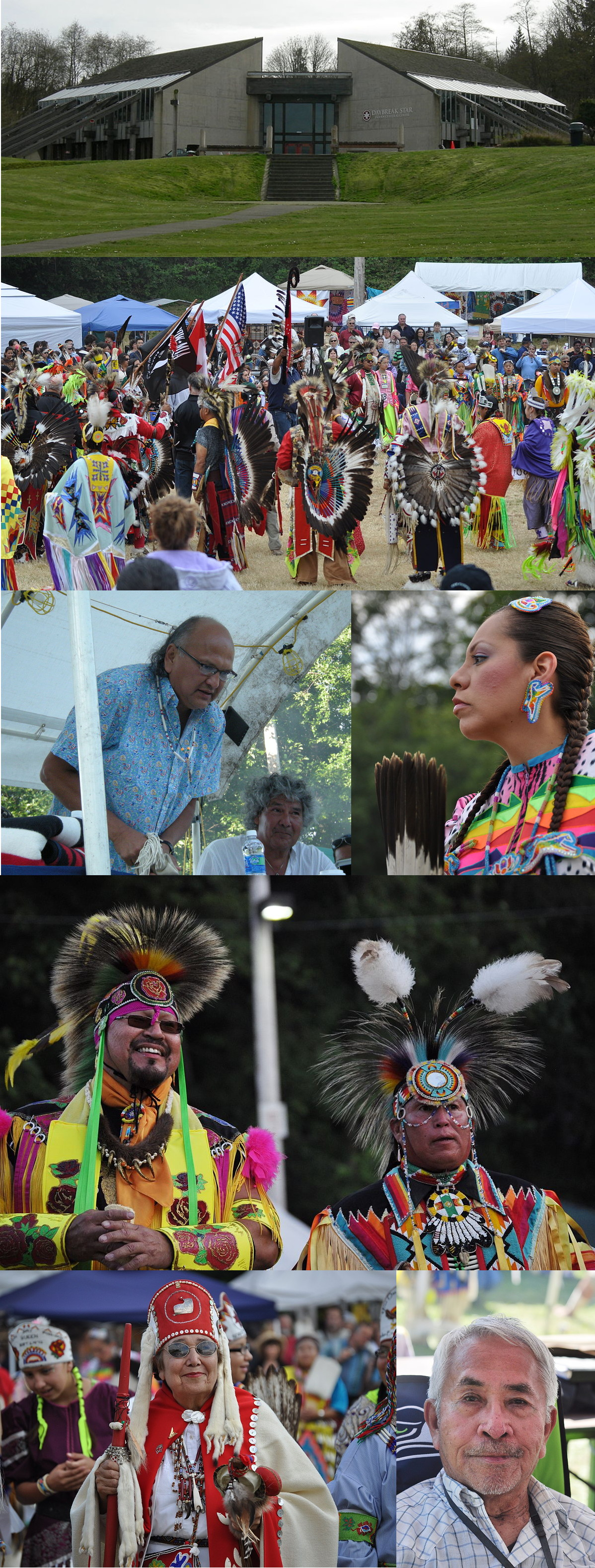
From top, reading left to right: • Daybreak Star Cultural Center • Seafair Indian Days / UIATF Pow-Wow, hereafter "UIATF Pow-Wow" (2010) • Diné / Navajo musician Arlie Neskahi and Marty Bluewater, then executive director of UIATF, at UIATF Pow-Wow (2009) • Woman participating in Saturday Grand entry, UIATF Pow-Wow (2009) • Dancers in regalia, UIATF Pow-Wow (2009) • Woman participating in UIATF Pow-Wow (2009) • Lawney Reyes attending UIATF Pow-Wow (2016)

United Indians of All Tribes (also known as the United Indians of All Tribes Foundation, or UIATF) is a non-profit foundation that provides social and educational services to Native Americans in the Seattle metropolitan area and aims to promote the well-being of the Native American community of the area. The organization is based at the Daybreak Star Cultural Center in Seattle, Washington's Discovery Park. UIATF has an annual budget of approximately $4.5 million as of 2013.

== History of Native Americans in the Seattle area ==
Many tribes historically inhabited the Seattle area and, to a greater extent, the surrounding Puget Sound area, because of the rich resources of food and fish. Major groups of local contemporary native peoples or tribes include the Suquamish, Duwamish, Nisqually, Snoqualmie, and Muckleshoot (Ilalkoamish, Stuckamish, and Skopamish) tribes. Many Alaskan Natives and Native Americans from the Inland Northwest have also come to live in Seattle. As a result, the city has a large and very diverse urban Indian population. According to the 2000 U.S. census, there are 86,649 American Indians/Alaskan Natives living in the Seattle, Tacoma, and Bremerton area. The Seattle area has become a nexus of many different tribal cultures from all over the country, with large influences from Coast Salish, Tlingit, Haida, and Plateau Indian cultures.

== History of Daybreak Star ==
UIATF was established in 1970 during the struggle by Northwest Natives to gain ownership or control of a portion of Fort Lawton, as the United States Army had shrunk its base there. Bernie Whitebear emerged as the group's CEO, a position he held until shortly before his death from cancer in 2000. After winning the concession of a renewable 99-year lease on 20 acres (81,000 square meters) in what was to become Discovery Park, Whitebear led the fund-raising for Daybreak Star. Whitebear's brother, the designer and sculptor Lawney Reyes, set forth the "philosophy, nomenclature, and organizational needs of UIATF," working with Northwest architect Arai Jackson to design the center. Whitebear negotiated with then-governor Daniel J. Evans for a $1 million construction grant from Washington State; he also obtained an $80,000 grant for artwork for the building's interior from the Seattle Arts Commission, of which he became a member. Further donations came from tribes and corporations, including many of the materials used in the building.

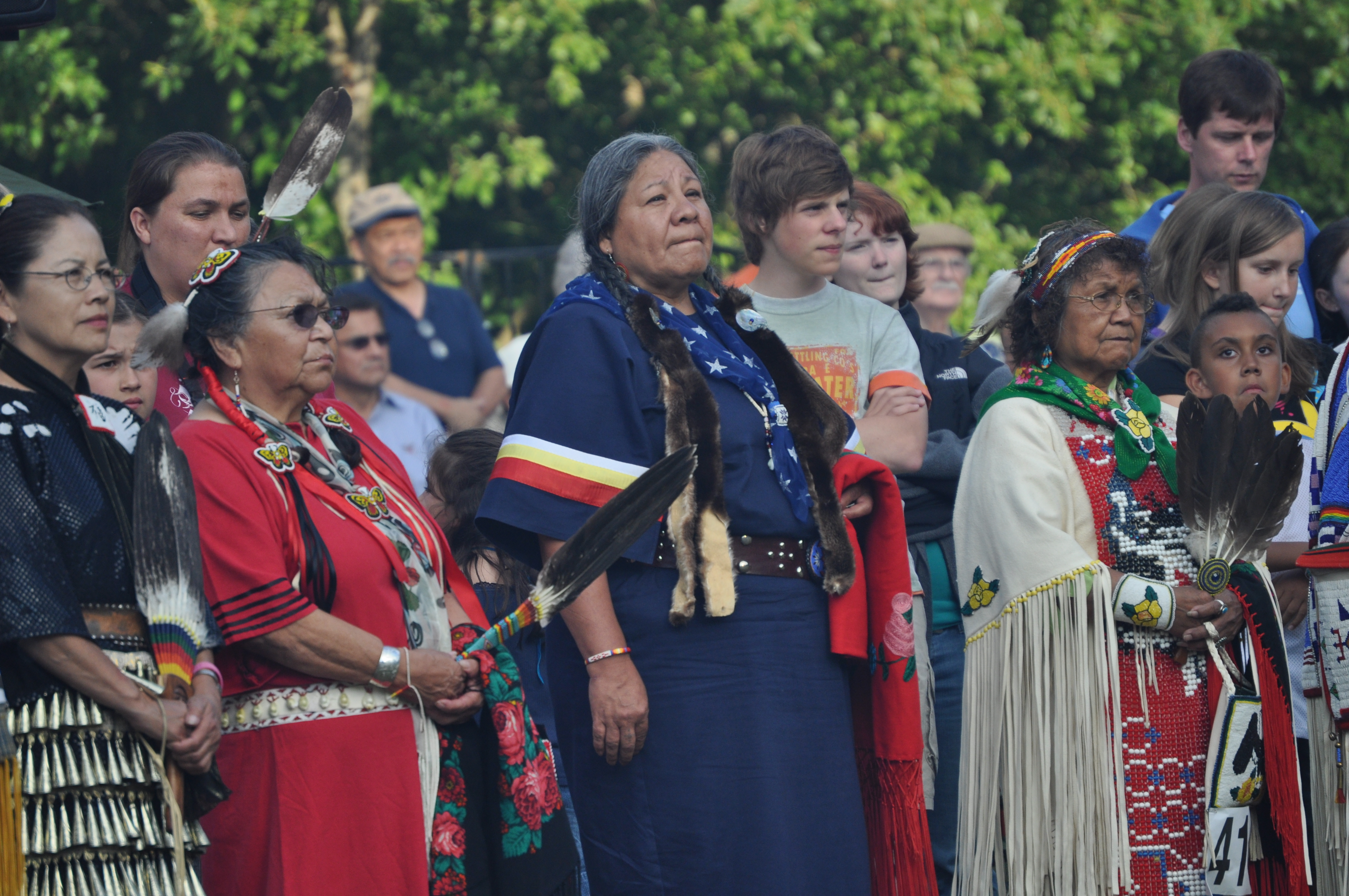
Attending Seafair Indian Days / UIATF Pow-Wow (2009)

Beginning in 1975 with the grant for artwork, the foundation opened the Sacred Circle Art Gallery at Daybreak Star. The Sacred Circle Art Gallery features both a permanent collection as well as a temporary exhibit space. Until 2001, the gallery featured contemporary art by renowned Native artists such as James Lavadour, Edgar Heap of Birds, and Marvin Oliver. After Whitebear's death, a new group of leaders made changes to the gallery, such as changing its name from the Sacred Circle Art Gallery to the Daybreak Star Indian Art Gallery, whittling two viewing rooms down to one, and shifting the focus away from contemporary Native American art. The gallery carries some contemporary work and continues to rebrand itself. Daybreak has also put on several art markets throughout the year.

== Other initiatives ==
The United Indians of all Tribes Foundation also provides programs such as Indian child welfare services, therapy, and treatment; elder services, including a lunch program; a GED education program; and youth services, including advocacy, substance abuse treatment, and housing for homeless youth. Other programs have included the Ina Maka family program, education and employment services, a child development center, and the ECEAP (Early Childhood Education & Assistance Program) preschool. The foundation also organizes the annual Seafair Indian Days, one of the larger pow-wows in the Northwest, held in conjunction with the city's festival called Seafair. The pow-wow draws tribal members from across the state, Oregon, Idaho, Montana, and Canada.

Youth services include the 25-bed home Labateyah Youth Home (sometimes written La-ba-te-yah) at 9010 13th Avenue NW, near Holman Road in Seattle's Crown Hill neighborhood. Since 1992, Labateyah has offered transitional and state group housing to youth between the ages of 18 and 24. The name Labateyah is Lushootseed for "the transformer". The program is not exclusively for Native American youth, who compose about a quarter of the facility's clients.

Another initiative contemplated by Whitebear was the People's Lodge at Daybreak Star, intended to include a Hall of Ancestors, a Potlatch House, a theater, and a museum, later called the "Daybreak Star Village" proposal, a project now indefinitely postponed for financial reasons. There is also the Pacific Northwest Indian Canoe Center, intended as part of the ongoing development at South Lake Union, just north of downtown,—for which ground was broken February 28, 2007. Both the People's Lodge and the Canoe Center were conceived by Whitebear but left in the planning phases at the time of his death.

Current UIATF initiatives include:

- The Community Story, a program to facilitate assisting the local indigenous community through input from the Native community and integrating the input into the foundation's programming and to identify their needs.
- Pathways to Prosperity, a program aimed to alleviate poverty by providing the necessary tools and knowledge to break this cycle in the Native community.

Proposed UIATF initiatives include:

- Daybreak Star College, a primary and secondary preparatory school.
- Bernie Whitebear Center for Human and Community Development, in White Center, an unincorporated neighborhood between Seattle and Burien, an area where there are an increasing number of Native Americans.
- Daybreak Star Youth Summer Camp.

A $3.5 million grant received October 2007 from the Northwest Area Foundation should allow the Bernie Whitebear Center, Daybreak Star College—two of the proposed projects—and the Northwest Canoe Center to proceed. The Canoe Center will be on South Lake Union. The grant will also fund various economic development activities focused on employment and small business development.
