= Gang of Four (Seattle) =

American minority activists

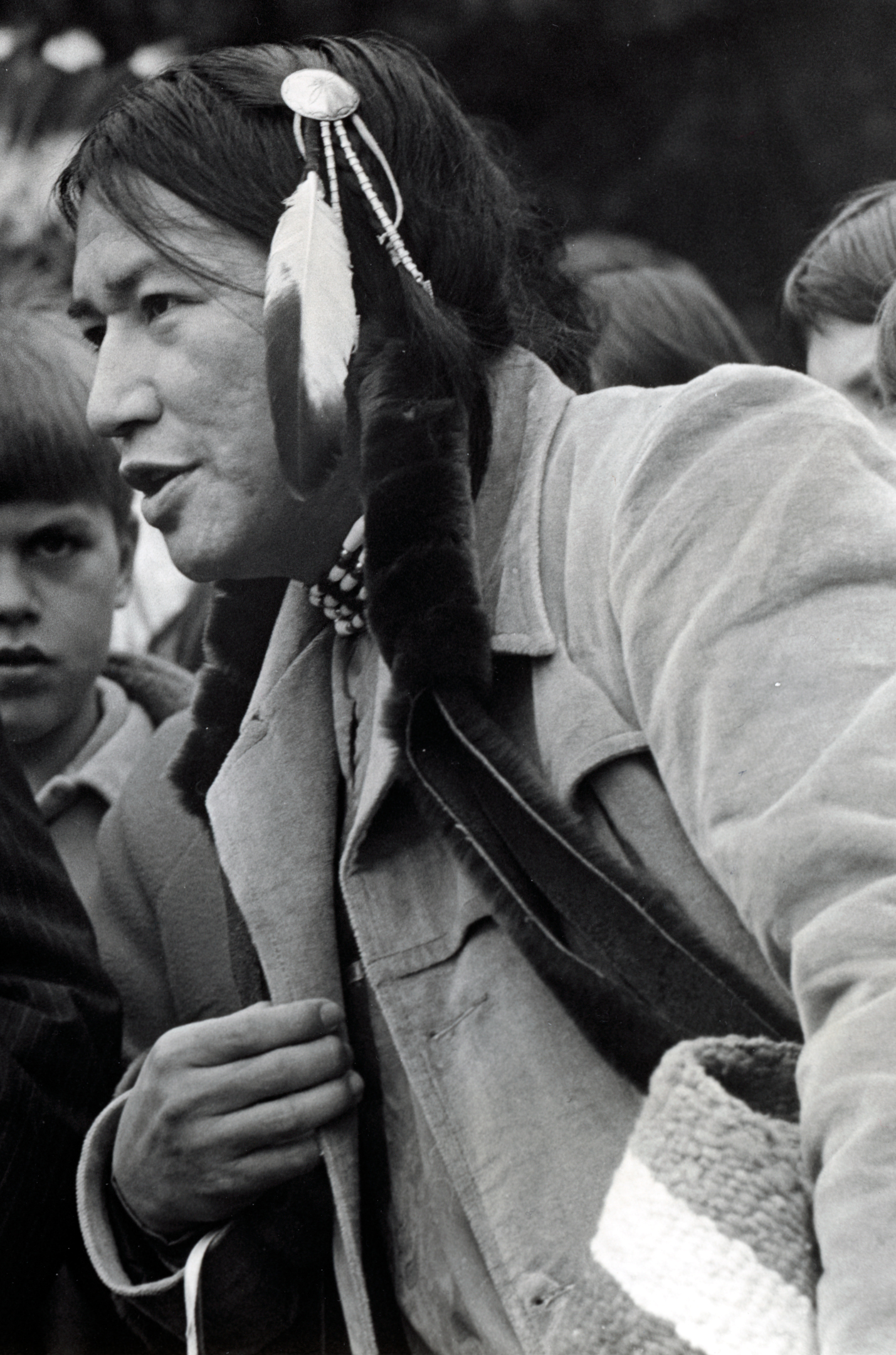
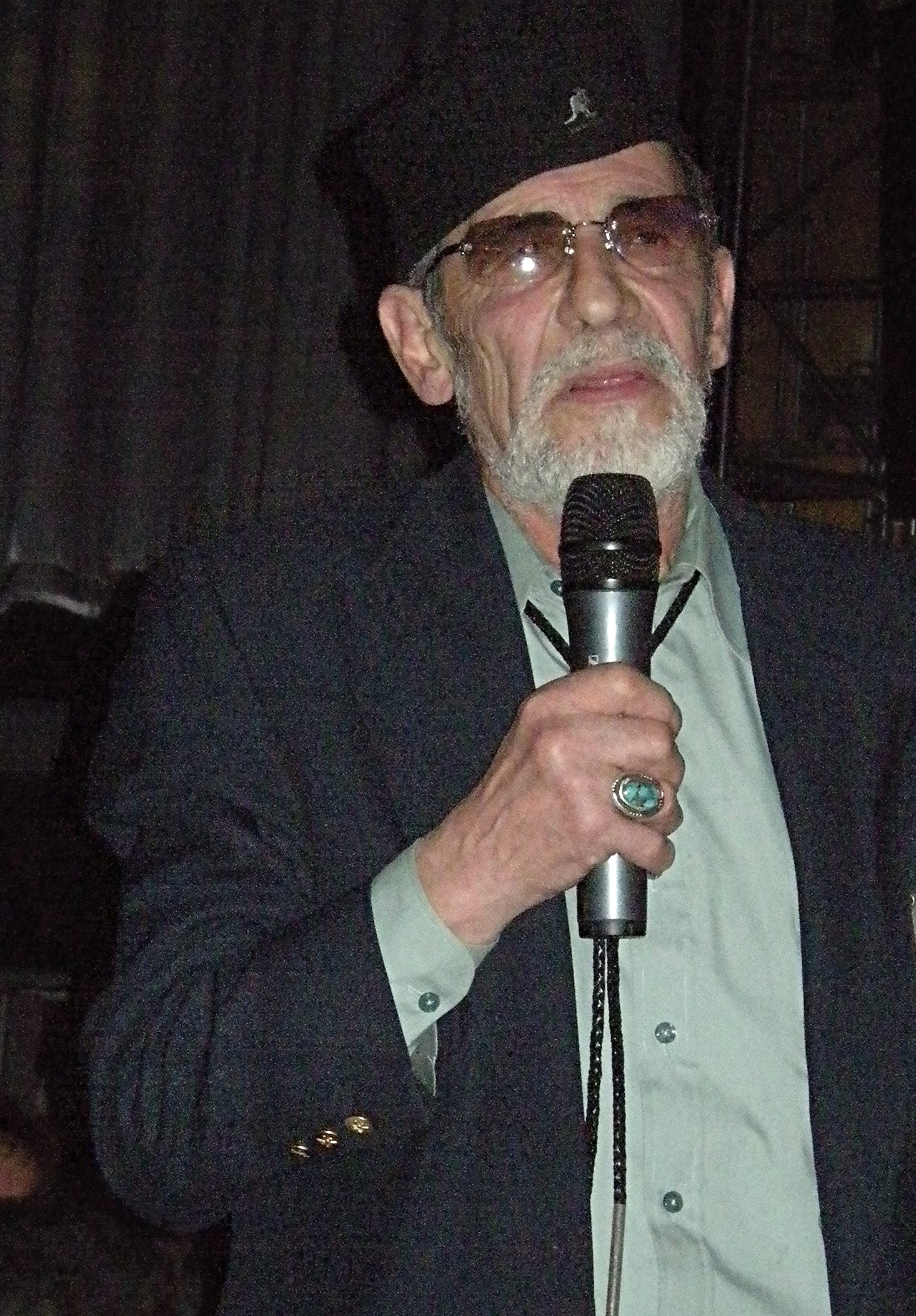
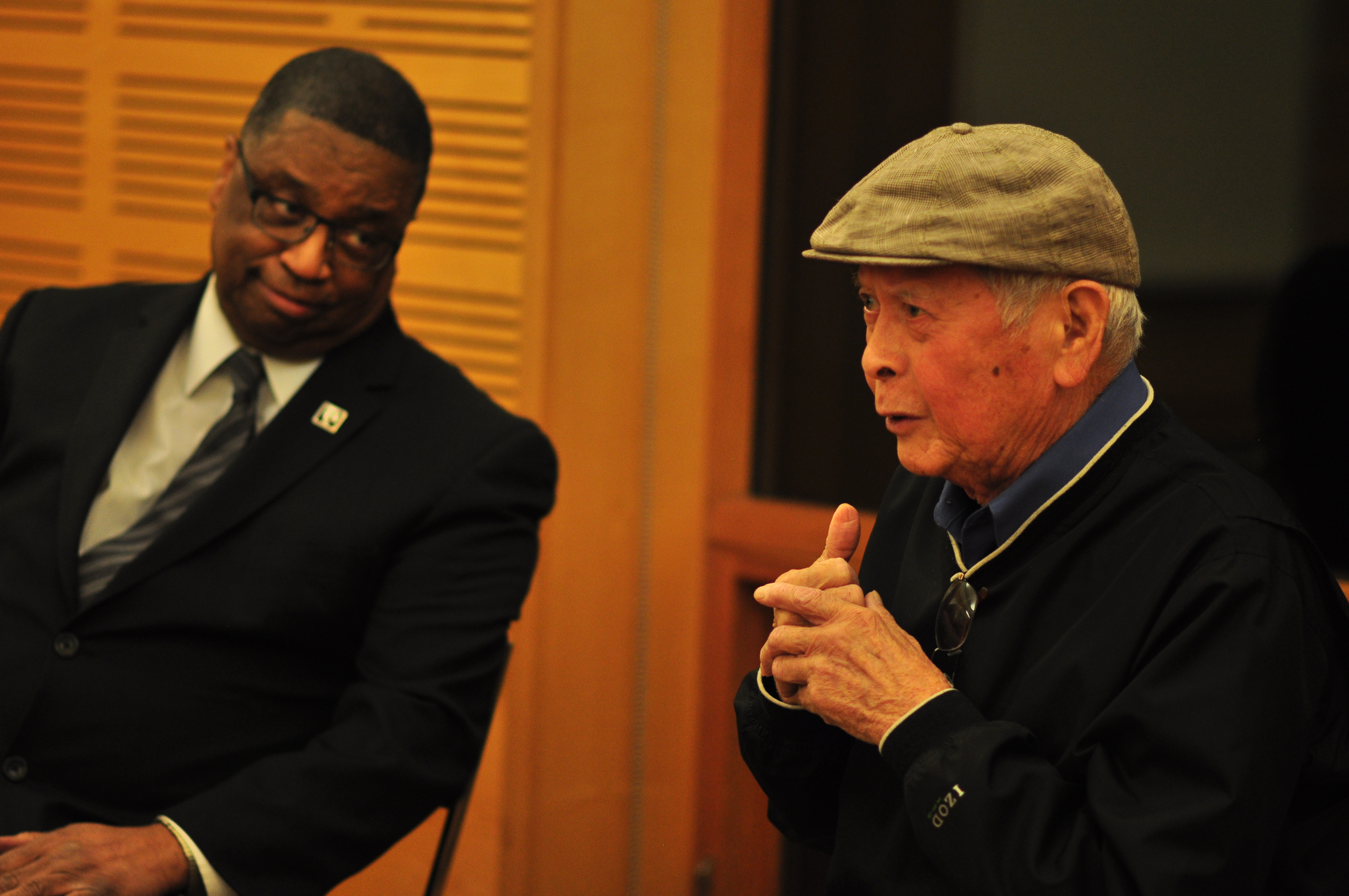
The Gang of Four, clockwise: Bernie Whitebear (1971); Roberto Maestas (2008); Bob Santos and Larry Gossett (2016)

In the politics of Seattle, Washington in the United States, "Gang of Four" (also, sometimes "The Four Amigos") refers to Bernie Whitebear, Bob Santos, Roberto Maestas, and Larry Gossett. They were leaders in the civil rights movement in Seattle and good friends, bringing together their communities for mutually supportive protests and direct actions. In 1982 they founded Seattle's Minority Executive Directors's Coalition, which helped nonprofit leaders coordinate across the city.

All four were associated with radical minority rights activism in the late 1960s and early 1970s, and all went on to leadership roles. Whitebear founded the Seattle Indian Health Board and the United Indians of All Tribes Foundation. Santos was a prominent leader among Seattle's Asian Americans, director of the Asian Coalition, and executive director of the Inter*Im in the International District; Maestas was the founder and director of El Centro de la Raza. While studying at the University of Washington, Gossett founded a Black Student Union. He later created Central Area Motivation Program and went on to public office as a member of the King County Council.

== History ==
=== St. Peter Claver Center coalitions ===
In the late 1960s, Bob Santos ran a tutoring program at the St. Peter Claver Center, a community center managed by Immaculate Conception Church. Father Harvey McIntyre, who Larry Gossett described as a "revolutionary pastor", asked Santos to manage room rentals to different groups. Santos rented it for free to activist groups that couldn't pay, including the Central Area Civil Rights Committee, Tyree Scott and construction worker activists, Roberto Maestas and United Farm Worker staff, and Bernie Whitebear and Native American activists planning the occupation of Fort Lawton.

These activists began supporting each others' direct actions, meeting to coordinate across groups and joining each others protests and City Council meeting appearances. Santos got to know Whitebear and Maestas' wife Stella during this early period of coordination.

=== Franklin sit-in ===
On March 29, 1968, three Black students were expelled from Franklin High School. Two girls had worn natural hair to school and were given notes to their mothers saying they could not return until their hair looked "ladylike", implying it should be straightened in the style of white people's hair. A black boy, the president of the school's Black Student Union, was expelled for fighting with a white student, and was not given the opportunity to explain his side of the story to administrators. Black students at the school were ready to protest. E.J. Brisker and Gossett, then a student activist at the University of Washington, helped them channel their energy into a peaceful sit-in of the principal's office. Gossett, Aaron Dixon, and Carl Miller were arrested for unlawful assembly due to the sit-in.

Maestas was a Spanish teacher at Franklin at the time. He was the only teacher to talk with the students and ask them about the sit-in. They vouched for him to Gossett, and the activists talked for two hours. Maestas credited this action for heightening his political consciousness, and the next day, he announced in the school teachers lounge that he only wanted to be referred to as Roberto, not Bob or Robert.

Maestas then attended the University of Washington for a graduate degree and was committed to further activism, including Native fishing rights, job access for Black construction workers, and farmworker organizing in Yakima valley. Seattle's coalition of multiracial activism continued to grow during this time, from supporting Scott's construction workers and the Black student association, to decentralizing the school district in 1971.

=== Occupation for El Centro de la Raza ===
Since 1970, Maestas was the director of English as a Second Language programs and helped develop adult education classes at South Seattle Community College. He would invite activists to come speak to his classes, including Santos, Gossett, and Scott.

In Fall 1972, funding for Maestas' programs was abruptly revoked, and Maestas led teachers, students, and activists across the Latino, Black, Asian, and Native American communities in occupying an abandoned school building on Beacon Hill. They began the sit-in on Columbus Day, 1972. After 73 days of occupation, rallies, and petitions, the city of Seattle agreed to convert the building into a community center, El Centro de la Raza. Maestas served as its director for 36 years.

=== Further organizations ===
In 1973, they founded the first Third World Coalition, building solidarity across international and domestic causes for people from the Third World. It was headquartered at El Centro de la Raza and involved many of the prior activists, as well as those from Polynesian and Filipino communities. They supported liberation movements for Africa, Latin America, and some parts of Asia, and fought for funding for domestic programs for people of color when President Nixon began cutting funding won in the civil rights movement.

In 1977, they founded Making Our Votes Effective (MOVE), prodding their communities to vote for Charlie Royer, the more progressive candidate, in the 1977 Seattle mayoral race. He won, in large part due to the votes MOVE drew out for him. In response, Royer hired many MOVE members for his first administration.
