= Larry Gossett =

American politician

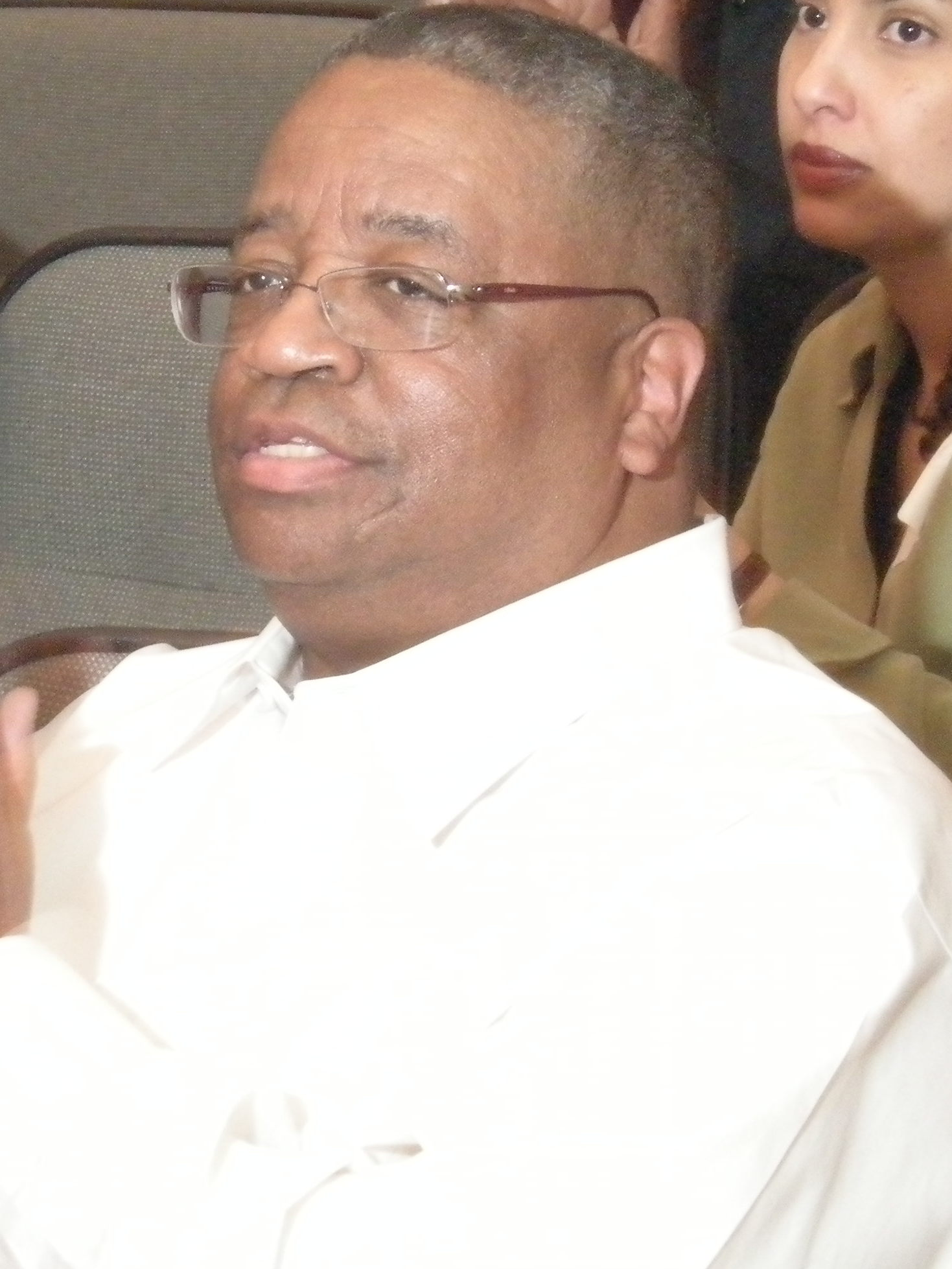
- Gossett in 2008

Chair of the King County Council
- In office January 16, 2013 – January 1, 2014
- Preceded by: Bob Ferguson
- Succeeded by: Larry Phillips
- In office January 1, 2007 – January 7, 2008
- Preceded by: Larry Phillips
- Succeeded by: Julia Patterson

Member of the King County Council
- In office January 1, 1994 – January 8, 2020
- Preceded by: Constituency established
- Succeeded by: Girmay Zahilay
- Constituency: District 10 (1994–2006); District 2 (2006–2020)

Personal details
- Born: Lawrence Edward Gossett; February 21, 1945 (age 81) Seattle, Washington, U.S.
- Party: Democratic
- Children: 2
- Education: University of Washington (BA)
- Occupation: Politician; activist

Lawrence Edward Gossett (born February 21, 1945) is an American politician and activist who served as a member of the nonpartisan King County Council, representing District 10 from 1994 to 2006 and District 2 from 2006 to 2020. Gossett served as chair of the council in 2007 and 2013. He is also a member of the Gang of Four, a coalition of influential Seattle activists.

== Early life and education ==
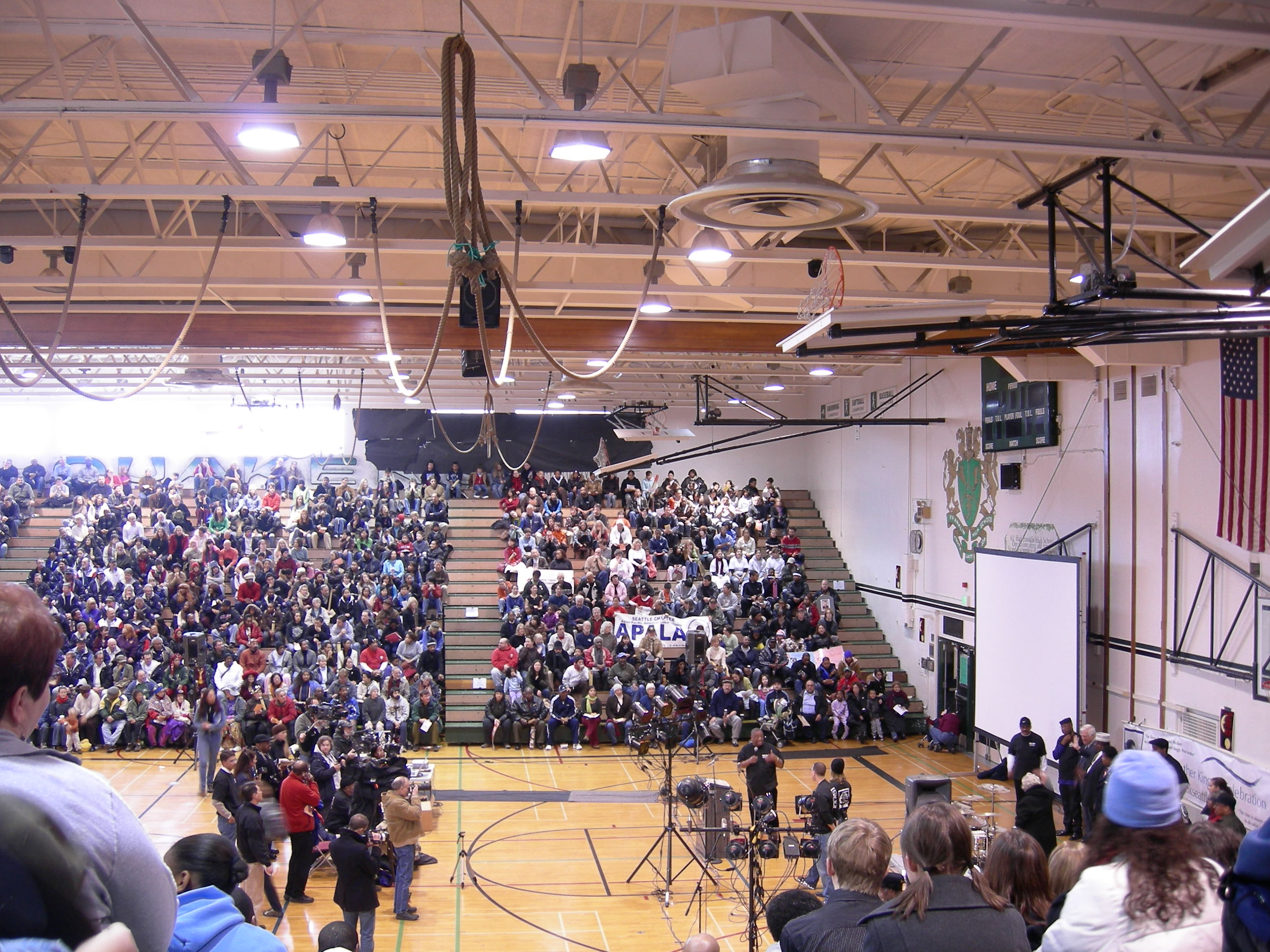
Gossett addressing a Martin Luther King Jr. Day rally at the Franklin High School gymnasium (2006).

Gossett was born in Seattle to two sharecroppers who had emigrated from Nigton, Texas, to the Central District. He graduated Franklin High School in 1963 and later graduated from the University of Washington. In 1966 and 1967, he was a VISTA volunteer in Harlem. He initially joined VISTA for the draft deferment; his time in Harlem politicized and radicalized him.

== Career ==
Returning to Seattle, he became a founder of the Black Student Union on the UW campus and helped to organize nearly a dozen high school and middle school Black Student Unions throughout Seattle. As a student activist, he was instrumental in bringing about the UW's Educational Opportunity Program minority recruitment program. He also played a role in the discrimination of black track athletes from Oregon State University, resulting in their early departure from a track meet. He graduated from the UW in 1970, receiving the university's first-ever degree in African American studies. Before he had even formally received his BA, he became the first supervisor of the Black Student Division in the university's Office of Minority Affairs. The Seattle Civil Rights and Labor History Project describes him as having been, in the late 1960s, "one of Seattle’s best known young black radicals."

A former member of Student Nonviolent Coordinating Committee, he worked as a community organizer in Seattle. While still working for the University of Washington, he was involved in the occupation of a former Seattle public school that ultimately became El Centro de la Raza. His continued involvement in civil disobedience led to a request to "cool it", from the head of the Office of Minority Affairs, Samuel E. Kelly. Eventually, he left his position at the university. After working on the successful 1977 mayoral campaign of Charles Royer, he served briefly in the Royer administration, but felt that was taking him too far from his work as an activist. From April 1979 to December 1993, he was the executive director of Seattle's Central Area Motivation Program ("CAMP"). He eventually worked on Jesse Jackson's presidential campaigns.

=== Black Panthers ===
Several sources state that Gossett was a member of the Black Panthers. By Gossett's own account, he attended the founding meeting of Seattle's Panther chapter, and also attended Panther leader Bobby Hutton's 1968 funeral; he worked on several political actions with Panther Party members and has said positive things about their legacy. Gossett has admitted in recent years that he was a long time member of the Seattle chapter of the Black Panther Party.

=== King County Council ===
Gossett was elected to the Council in 1993. Gossett ran unopposed in 1999, 2003, 2007, 2011 and 2015.

Gossett's office in the King County Courthouse is in the same location that his prison cell was in 1968 when he was arrested for unlawful assembly during a sit-in at Franklin High School on March 29.

He was defeated by Girmay Zahilay in the 2019 election after serving six terms.

== Personal life ==
Gossett is Catholic, married, and has three children.

== See also ==
- Gang of Four (Seattle)
