= Daybreak Star Cultural Center =

Native American cultural center in Washington, US

Coordinates: 47°40′05″N 122°25′05″W

- Location: Seattle, Washington, United States
- Website: www.unitedindians.org

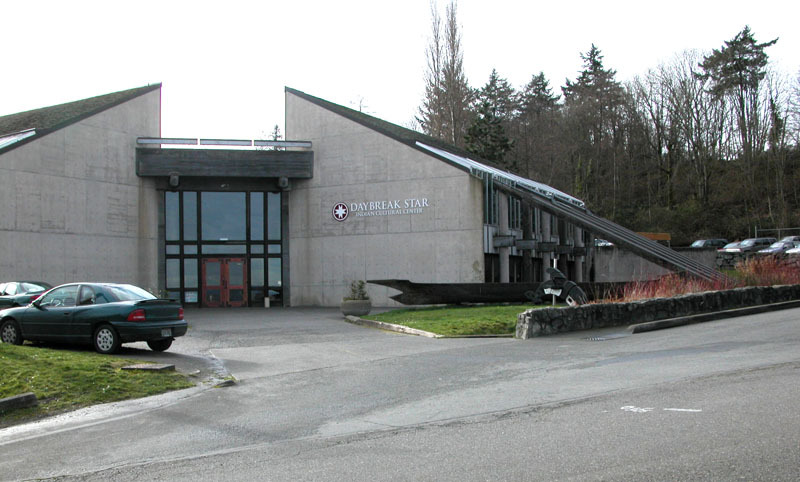
Daybreak Star Cultural Center

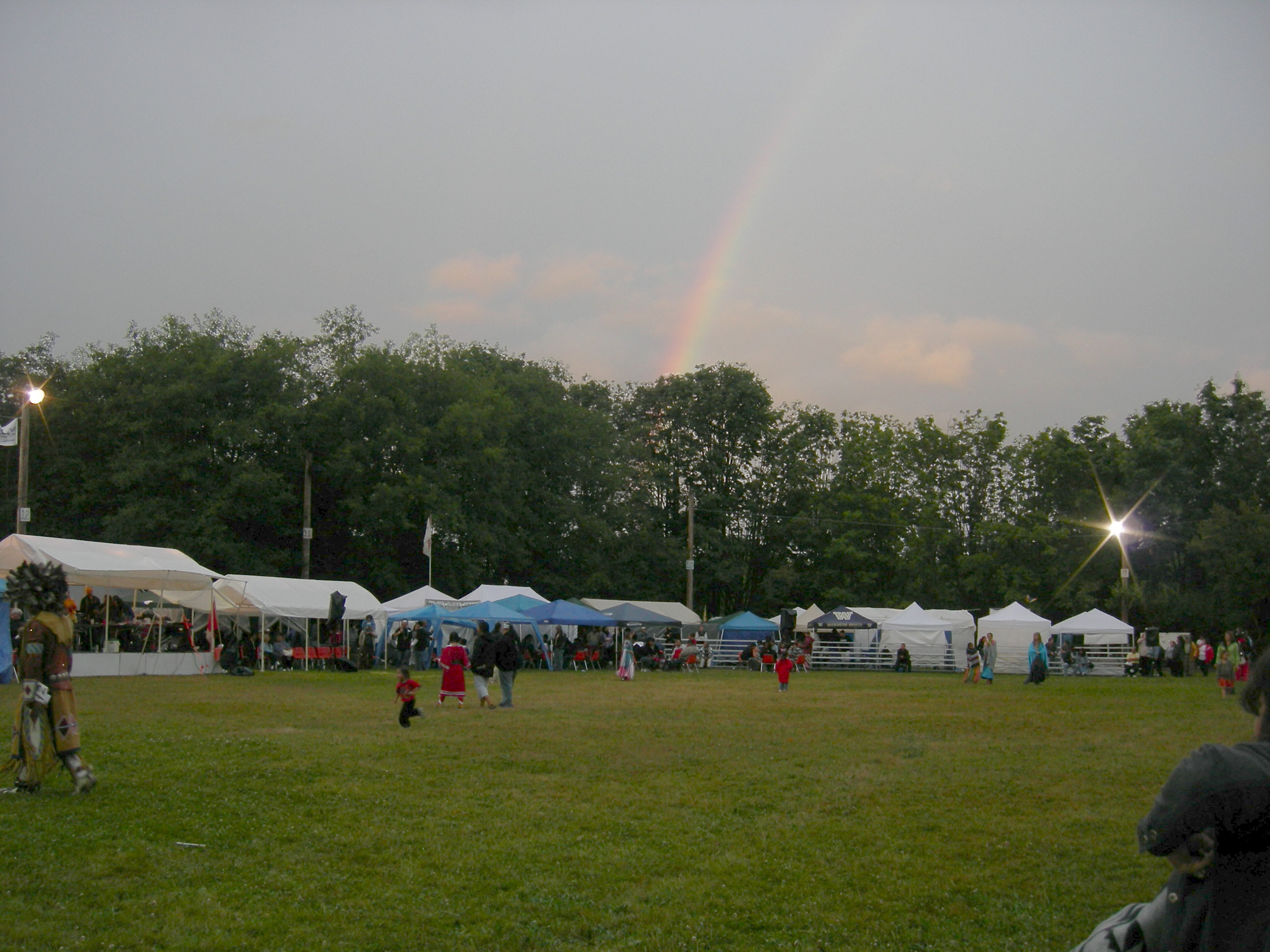
Early evening rainbow during 2007 Seafair Indian Days Pow Wow on the center's grounds

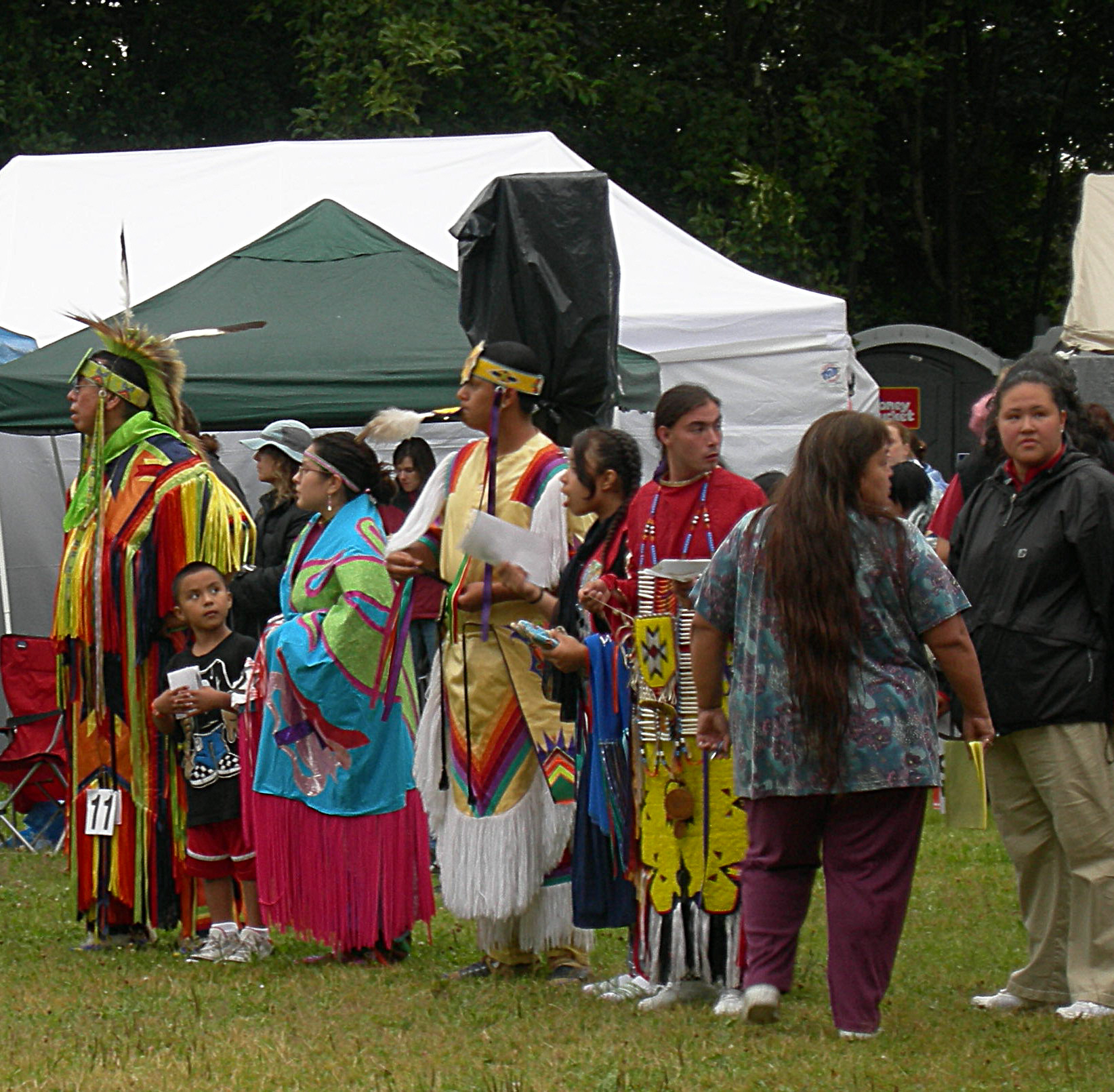
Dancers in regalia during the grand entry of the 2007 Seafair Indian Days Pow Wow

The Daybreak Star Indian Cultural Center is a Native American cultural center in Seattle, Washington, described by its parent organization United Indians of All Tribes as "an urban base for Native Americans in the Seattle area." Located on 20 acres (81,000 m^{2}) in Seattle's Discovery Park in the Magnolia neighborhood, the center developed from activism by Bernie Whitebear and other Native Americans, who staged a generally successful self-styled "invasion" and occupation of the land in 1970. Most of the former Fort Lawton military base had been declared surplus by the U.S. Department of Defense. "The claim [Whitebear and others made] to Fort Lawton was based on rights under 1865 U.S.-Indian treaties promising reversion of surplus military lands to their original owners."

The existing building, a work of modern architecture incorporating many elements of traditional Northwest Native architecture, was designed by Arai Jackson Architects and Planners and completed in 1977. In 2004, plans were approved to supplement it with a complex of three additional related buildings, to be known as the People's Lodge. This was Whitebear's final dream project before he died of cancer in 2000. But in 2006, after agreements had been reached between the tribes, the city and nearby residents on a reduced size for the new project, the Center decided to postpone construction indefinitely for lack of funds.

Daybreak Star, a major nucleus of Native American cultural activity in its region, functions as a conference center, a location for pow wows, the location for a Head Start school program, and an art gallery. The center's permanent art collection includes a variety of large art works by and about Native Americans, notably Blue Jay, a 30-foot (9 m) wide, 12 foot (3.7 m) high sculpture by Lawney Reyes, Whitebear's brother. It was commissioned by and hung prominently for more than 30 years at the Bank of California building in downtown Seattle. (After the Bank of California merged with Union Bank in 1996 to form Union Bank of California, the work was donated to the Daybreak Star Center.) Also included in that donation was a major oil painting by Guy Anderson, based on a traditional Northwest Native representation of a whale.

Bernie Whitebear is memorialized by the Bernie Whitebear Memorial Ethnobotanical Garden next to the Center building.

== History ==
In 1970, the U.S. federal government was in the process of reviewing military needs and planned to declare as surplus much of the grounds of Fort Lawton, located on Puget Sound in the northwestern section of the Magnolia neighborhood. The state's two U.S. Senators, Henry M. "Scoop" Jackson and Warren G. Magnuson amended the U.S. Land and Water Conservation Act of 1965, reducing the previous 50–100 percent cost of acquiring surplus federal government property to 0–50 percent, so that such property might be acquired by bodies other than real estate developers. The property would initially be transferred to the city but was not constrained in use. In that period of Indian activism, many of Seattle's urban Indians were concerned to gain a land base within the city. (As of the early 21st century, about 25,000 Indians from a variety of tribes live in the Seattle area.)

A group arose, initially identifying as Kinatechitapi, Blackfoot for "All Indians"; the name referred to the Indians of All Tribes (IAT), a group of mostly student activists then occupying Alcatraz Island in San Francisco Bay. Joe DeLaCruz, leader of the Quinault, conducted outreach to every tribe in Washington State to try to gain their support for gaining land in Seattle.

Kinatechitapi's first efforts to open discussions about the property with the City of Seattle, in advance of surplus land being transferred to the city, failed. The city, under mayor Wes Uhlman, said it would not open discussions until it had acquired the land, and referred the group to the Bureau of Indian Affairs (BIA). As Whitebear later wrote, "This action displayed their ignorance of both the BIA's restricted service policy, which excluded urban Indians, and also the disregard and disfavor urban Indians held for the BIA." The City said that the Indian Center in a former church near Stewart Street downtown was an adequate facility for Seattle's Indians. The members of the Magnolia Community Club, a group with significant political clout, were opposed to an Indian presence on the Fort Lawton land.

Kinatechitapi members split between a faction that called for direct action and one that preferred to wait until the city acquired the land, in order to conduct negotiations. Prominent among those who preferred to wait was Pearl Warren, founder of the American Indian Women's Service League, who was concerned that a militant attitude would result in the city's reducing its provision of services to urban Indians. Members agreed that those who wished to take more extreme action would not use the name Kinatechitapi. Warren lost the next election for presidency of the Service League to Joyce Reyes, who was aligned with those promoting direct action. All significant Seattle Indian organizations agreed on taking action.

=== Direct action ===
The more militant faction, led by Bernie Whitebear, soon adopted the name "American Indian Fort Lawton Occupation Forces". The faction included Bob Satiacum, initially a rival to Whitebear for the top leadership role. A group vote settled on Whitebear as leader. Some of the Indians of All Tribes traveled to Seattle from Alcatraz for the action, including Richard Oakes, leader of that action; other activists came from Canada. Grace Thorpe, daughter of athlete Jim Thorpe, also arrived to give support. Local activists Ella Aquino and Ramona Bennett helped plan the occupation. The group planned to invade the base from two directions, with one group scaling the bluffs from Elliott Bay while another scaled the fence near the Lawton Wood community on the north side of the base. The group committed to nonviolence in this action.

American Indian soldiers and others were protesting at Fort Lewis, near Tacoma, linking native rights to opposition to the Vietnam War. At the behest of the Fort Lewis coalition, actress Jane Fonda came to Seattle at the time of the invasion of Fort Lawton. According to Whitebear, her presence:

"captured the imagination of the world press. American Indians were attacking active military forts along with one of the nation's leading opponents of United States involvement in the Vietnam War." Her presence transformed "an effort to secure a land base for urban Indians" into "a bizarre, ready-for-prime-time, movie scenario, complete with soldiers, modern-day Indians, and anti-war activists. Without really appreciating it at the time, the Indian movement had achieved through Jane Fonda's presence, a long-sought credibility which would not have been possible otherwise."

On the evening of March 7, 1970, at a pow-wow held at the Filipino Community Hall in south Seattle, invasion plans were announced. The following day, March 8, 1970, about 100 "Native Americans and sympathizers" confronted military police in riot gear at the fort, while about 500 supporters staged a legal protest outside the gates. Some of the invaders reached the base chapel, where a Sunday service was in progress, but in general, skirmish lines were quickly formed and the military police contained the invasion. Some of the invaders failed to maintain non-violence, especially when confronted by what Whitebear characterized as "overly aggressive handling by the MPs". MPs (Military Police), aided by regular Army troops and Seattle Police, initially placed the invaders in the fort stockade, then ejected them from the fort. The Indian activists established a tipi encampment outside the fort. Mayor Uhlman and Senator Jackson held a press conference about the Fort Lawton property, promising a city park at the site above Puget Sound. They did not refer to the Indian action.

=== United Indians of All Tribes Foundation ===
Organizing as the United Indians of All Tribes Foundation (UIATF) with Whitebear as executive director, the Indians used tactics ranging from politicking to occupation of land to celebrity appearances to gain more support. For three months, activists engaged in what Whitebear later described as "Invasion, arrests, jailings, letters of expulsion from military property, physical escort off the fort, re-invasion." The Army cordoned off the fort with concertina wire, brought in two companies of troops from Fort Lewis to prevent incursions, and dug foxholes.

By this time more than 40 non-Indian organizations in King County supported the Indians' efforts. Gary and Beverly Beaver, Randy Lewis, Grace Thorpe, Douglas Remington, and Bernie Whitebear testified before a congressional committee chaired by Morris Udall, and received support from US congressman Brock Adams from Seattle. Whitebear forged a relationship with Tom McLaughlin, deputy regional director of the United States Department of Health, Education, and Welfare and through him with Buck Kelley, the regional director and top political appointee for HEW in the region. UIATF, which had previously avoided dealing with the BIA, now went through the National Congress of American Indians to approach the BIA and request a freeze on plans to transfer land at Fort Lawton until the issue between UIATF and the city was resolved. BIA commissioner Louis Bruce imposed such a freeze for a time, but eventually backed off at the behest of his boss, the Department of the Interior.

When the federal government officially put the surplus land up for offers, UIATF filed to acquire a portion of the fort directly from the federal government. Thanks to Whitebear's maneuvering, UIATF's application to acquire part of the land was technically filed prior to the city's application for the whole parcel. The federal General Services Administration, which handled the surplus process, ultimately insisted that the City and UIATF come up with a joint plan for the property. In November 1971, the parties agreed that the city would grant UIATF with a 99-year lease on 20 acres (81,000 m^{2}) in what would become Seattle's Discovery Park, with options for renewal without renegotiation. In addition, the City granted $600,000 to the American Indian Women's Service League for a social services center.

Whitebear was soon elected as CEO of the UIATF, and undertook fundraising (including a one million dollar grant from the state), and supervision of design and construction. Whitebear's brother Lawney Reyes joined with architects of Arai Jackson to design the facility, which used traditional Native American elements in a modern building. It opened in 1977.

In the same era when Daybreak Star was being constructed, Whitebear was appointed to the Seattle Arts Commission. The UIATF was granted an $80,000 arts grant for the center. The center has wireless Internet access ("UIATF-A").
