= List of shipwrecks in 1911 =

This list of shipwrecks in 1911 includes ships sunk, foundered, grounded, or otherwise lost during 1911.

table of contents
1911
Jan	Feb	Mar	Apr
May	Jun	Jul	Aug
Sep	Oct	Nov	Dec
Unknown date

== January ==
=== 1 January ===
List of shipwrecks: 1 January 1911
Ship	State	Description
Saint Anthony	United States	During a voyage to Metlakatla, District of Alaska, with seven passengers, three crewmen, and no cargo aboard, the 7-gross register ton, 31-foot (9.4 m) motor passenger vessel was wrecked on a reef in Nichols Passage in Clarence Strait in the Alexander Archipelago in Southeast Alaska about 2 nautical miles (3.7 km; 2.3 mi) northwest of Metlakatla and was destroyed by a fire that broke out when her gasoline tank exploded. All on board survived and were rescued by the motorboat Eagle (United States).

=== 2 January ===
List of shipwrecks: 2 January 1911
Ship	State	Description
Bamse	Norway	The 957-ton barque was swamped by a wave and sunk with all hands in a storm in the North Sea.

=== 7 January ===
List of shipwrecks: 7 January 1911
Ship	State	Description
Burton	United Kingdom	The ship was leaving Alderney Channel Islands harbour when it suffered steering problems and ran aground on the Grois Reef. Floating free she was anchored but broke up in a storm on 11 January and became a total loss.

=== 10 January ===
List of shipwrecks: 10 January 1911
Ship	State	Description
Treverton, Corbin, and Pine Forest	United States	The coal barges broke their tow from Lykens (United States) and were wrecked on Cape Cod. 17 killed.

=== 11 January ===
List of shipwrecks: 11 January 1911
Ship	State	Description
Mary E. Oyls	United States	The schooner went aground on Edgartown Flats off Edgartown, Massachusetts.

=== 25 January ===
List of shipwrecks: 25 January 1911
Ship	State	Description
Rosario di Giorgio	Norway	The 1,037 GRT cargo ship ran aground the reef at the northern end entrance to Manchioneal Harbour on her way from Baltimore, Maryland, to load a cargo of bananas. An attempt to refloat the vessel was attempted on 11 February, but proved to be unsuccessful, and she was abandoned.

=== 28 January ===
List of shipwrecks: 28 January 1911
Ship	State	Description
Stephen G. Hart	United States	The barkentine was wrecked on Cuttyhunk Island. Apparently salvaged and returned to service.

=== 29 January ===
List of shipwrecks: 29 January 1911
Ship	State	Description
Wiln	United Kingdom	The schooner was in collision with the steamship Irena (United Kingdom) in the Bristol Channel and foundered with the loss of four of her six crew. She was on a voyage from Devonport, Devon to Llanelli, Glamorgan.

=== Unknown date ===
List of shipwrecks: Unknown date January 1911
Ship	State	Description
Ardencraig	United Kingdom	The vessel was wrecked off the Gunners, Isles of Scilly.
Ella M. Goodwin	United States	The fishing schooner probably lost in a gale later in the day after leaving the Bay of Islands on 21 January. All ten crew were killed.
Knocker	United States	With no one on board, the 9-gross register ton motor vessel burned on the Atchafalaya River at Morgan City, Louisiana.

== February ==
=== 2 February ===
List of shipwrecks: 2 February 1911
Ship	State	Description
Allegheny	Germany	The steamer was wrecked 100 miles (160 km) off Norfolk, Virginia in a heavy snowstorm. All crew were rescued from her boats after four hours.

=== 6 February ===
List of shipwrecks: 6 February 1911
Ship	State	Description
Glenbank	Russia	A cyclone wrecked the Finnish-owned steel-hulled sailing ship off Legendre Island on the Pilbara Coast with the loss of 19 of her 20 crew. The ship was rediscovered in 2022.

=== 10 February ===
List of shipwrecks: 10 February 1911
Ship	State	Description
Atlas	United Kingdom	The salvage tug foundered off Venetikos islet, south of Chios, on a voyage from Smyrna to Piraeus.

=== 15 February ===
List of shipwrecks: 15 February 1911
Ship	State	Description
Czarina	United States	The 230-gross register ton, 116-foot (35.4 m) schooner was wrecked during a gale on the east coast of Nagai Island in the District of Alaska's Shumagin Islands. Her crew of ten survived.

=== 18 February ===
List of shipwrecks: 18 February 1911
Ship	State	Description
Laura Sutcliffe	United States	The 42-gross register ton sternwheel paddle steamer burned on the Atchafalaya River at Berwick, Louisiana. All six people on board survived.

=== Unknown date ===
List of shipwrecks: Unknown date 1911
Ship	State	Description
Weatherall	United Kingdom	The Mousehole lugger sank about 4 nautical miles (7.4 km) off the Longships, Cornwall, United Kingdom, when she collided with the Lowestoft sailing trawler Trevone (United Kingdom). All but one of the crew scrambled aboard the trawler.

== March ==
=== 2 March ===
List of shipwrecks: 2 March 1911
Ship	State	Description
Cingetorix	Belgium	The vessel was wrecked one nautical mile (1.9 km; 1.2 mi) south of Hartland Point, Devon.

=== 3 March ===
List of shipwrecks: 3 March 1911
Ship	State	Description
Blue Bonnett	United States	The barge, under the tow of Sarah E. McWilliams (United States), went aground on Crane's Reef in Long Island Sound.
Blue line	United States	The barge, under the tow of Sarah E. McWilliams (United States), went aground on Crane's Reef in Long Island Sound.
Cap Spartel	Belgium	The vessel departed Swansea, Glamorgan, United Kingdom bound for Palermo, Italy. No further trace.
Jewel	United States	The 32-gross register ton sternwheel paddle steamer was lost when she struck a snag on Bayou Macon in Louisiana. All 13 people on board survived.
Sarah E. McWilliams	United States	The tugboat went aground on Crane's Reef in Long Island Sound.

=== 14 March ===
List of shipwrecks: 14 March 1911
Ship	State	Description
Hope	United States	The schooner was sunk in a collision with schooner Hattie S. Heckman in Gloucester, Massachusetts Harbor. Four crewmen killed.

=== 15 March ===
List of shipwrecks: 15 March 1911
Ship	State	Description
Silver Spray	United States	The fishing tug foundered on the breakwater at Cleveland, Ohio in a snowstorm. Refloated by June. Repaired and returned to service as Charlotte. All nine crew froze to death in the water.

=== 20 March ===
List of shipwrecks: 20 March 1911
Ship	State	Description
Bessie Smith	United States	The 127-gross register ton sternwheel paddle steamer burned at Parkersburg, West Virginia. All four people on board survived.

=== 22 March ===
List of shipwrecks: 22 March 1911
Ship	State	Description
Bruce	Canada	While en voyage from Channel-Port aux Basques, Newfoundland to Louisbourg, Nova Scotia, the vessel was driven on the rocks by ice, off Portnova Islands, (Main-a-Dieu Passage), southwest of Scatarie Island. Two crew members died.
USS San Marcos	United States Navy	The target ship, a former battleship, was sunk as a gunnery target in shallow water in Tangier Sound off Tangier Island in Chesapeake Bay by the battleship USS New Hampshire (United States Navy).

=== 23 March ===
List of shipwrecks: 23 March 1911
Ship	State	Description
Yongala	(United Kingdom) Australia	The passenger ship sank without trace off the Whitsunday Islands in a cyclone with the loss of all 122 passengers and crew, on a voyage from Melbourne to Cairns. The wreck was found in 1958.

=== 24 March ===
List of shipwrecks: 24 March 1911
Ship	State	Description
Sechelt	United States	The steamboat sank in Strait of Juan de Fuca during a gale with the loss of 24 passengers and crew.

=== 29 March ===
List of shipwrecks: 29 March 1911
Ship	State	Description
Buteshire	United Kingdom	The barque foundered whilst on a voyage from Pisagua, Chile to Hamburg, Germany.

== April ==
=== 4 April ===
List of shipwrecks: 4 April 1911
Ship	State	Description
Lewiston	United States	The 11-gross register ton motor vessel burned in Port Madison in Puget Sound off the coast of Washington. All four people on board survived.
O. D. Witherell	United States	O. D. Witherell aground on 21 April 1911. The schooner ran aground on the coast of Delaware 3 1/2 miles (5.6 km) south of Bethany Beach, 1.5 miles north of the Fenwick's Island Life-Saving Station.

=== 7 April ===
List of shipwrecks: 7 April 1911
Ship	State	Description
Jabez Howes	United States	The 1,648-gross register ton, 218.8-foot (66.7 m) three-masted sloop, operating as a cannery tender, dragged her anchor during a storm and was stranded in Anchorage Bay (56°19′N 158°23′W) near Chignik, District of Alaska. All on board – a ship′s crew of 37 and a cannery crew of 87 Chinese men – survived. Jabez Howes later slipped into deeper water and sank, becoming a total loss.

=== 8 April ===
List of shipwrecks: 8 April 1911
Ship	State	Description
Azor	Spanish Navy	The Azor-class torpedo boat was sunk in a collision with Orión (Spanish Navy) off Cádiz, Spain.

=== 10 April ===
List of shipwrecks: 10 April 1911
Ship	State	Description
Iroquois	Canada	SS Iroquois The steamer sank in the Strait of Georgia off Sidney, British Columbia after her cargo, having been poorly stowed, shifted when she encountered a squall. Twenty-one people died as a result of the accident and her captain was charged with, but acquitted of, manslaughter.

=== 21 April ===
List of shipwrecks: 21 April 1911
Ship	State	Description
Scow #2	United States	The Boston Sanitary Department scow capsized and sank in the main ship channel at Boston, Massachusetts.

=== 23 April ===
List of shipwrecks: 23 April 1911
Ship	State	Description
Doric	United Kingdom	The ocean liner ran aground in foggy conditions and was wrecked in the East China Sea near Taichow Islands, Wenzhou, China. Once all of the crew and passengers had been safely rescued, the ship was looted by local fishermen, who subsequently burnt its remains.

=== 27 April ===
List of shipwrecks: 27 April 1911
Ship	State	Description
The North Erin	United States	The steamer went ashore in fog on Long Island between the Tiana and Quoque Lights.

=== 29 April ===
List of shipwrecks: 29 April 1911
Ship	State	Description
Craigoswald	United Kingdom	Struck the Low Lee Rock, off Mousehole, Cornwall. While on a journey from Barry Docks to Venice, with 4,000 tons of coal, she took a detour to drop off in Penzance the chief engineer who was ill. Later refloated.

=== 30 April ===
List of shipwrecks: 30 April 1911
Ship	State	Description
Sadie Willcut	United States	The 365-gross register ton schooner was lost in a collision with the schooner George D. Edmands (United States) off Cape Cod, Massachusetts. All six people on board survived.

=== Unknown date ===
List of shipwrecks: Unknown date April 1911
Ship	State	Description
Helena F	United States	The 11-gross register ton schooner was lost after she collided with the New Orleans and Northeastern Railroad bridge in Lake Pontchartrain in Louisiana. All three people on board survived.

== May ==
=== 3 May ===
List of shipwrecks: 3 May 1911
Ship	State	Description
Rex	United States	The barge sank seven miles (11 km) west of Point Judith, Rhode Island.

=== 5 May ===
List of shipwrecks: 5 May 1911
Ship	State	Description
Wm. Edenborn	United States	The 239-gross register ton sternwheel paddle steamer sank off Naples, Louisiana. All 10 people on board survived.

=== 12 May ===
List of shipwrecks: 12 May 1911
Ship	State	Description
Koyukuk	United States	The 260-gross register ton, 120.9-foot (36.9 m) sternwheel paddle steamer sank in the Tanana River in the District of Alaska. All 14 people on board survived.
Merida	United States	The Ward Line liner was in collision in dense fog with American fruit steamship Admiral Farragut and sank 55 miles (89 km) off Cape Charles, Virginia in 210 feet (64 m) of water with the rumored loss of $2,000,000 of Mexican gold, silver, copper and jewels. All 319 people were saved by Admiral Farragut, with only one serious injury. Various attempts to salvage the treasure were attempted.

=== 16 May ===
List of shipwrecks: 16 May 1911
Ship	State	Description
Shawnee	United States	The schooner barge sank near the west breakwater at Cleveland, Ohio. The wreck removed 14 October 1914.

=== 18 May ===
List of shipwrecks: 18 May 1911
Ship	State	Description
Tampico	United States	The steamer sprung a leak at the Pacific Coast Coal Company dock in Elliott Bay, Seattle, Washington. She was towed away from the deep water slip and sank in shallow water off the Stetson-Post Lumber Mill around midnight on 18/19 May or just after midnight on 19 May. Refloated on 25 June.

=== 20 May ===
List of shipwrecks: 20 May 1911
Ship	State	Description
Nettie A. Ruark	United States	The 14-gross register ton motor vessel burned in the Chesapeake Bay off Poplar Island off the coast of Maryland. All four people on board survived.

=== 26 May ===
List of shipwrecks: 26 May 1911
Ship	State	Description
Angler	United States	The 93-gross register ton schooner was stranded on Duck Island in Long Island Sound off the coast of Connecticut. Both people on board survived.

=== Unknown date ===
List of shipwrecks: Unknown date May 1911
Ship	State	Description
Unknown derrick	United States Navy	The 75-ton floating crane/derrick sank at the Boston Navy Yard some time in May. Later raised.

== June ==
=== 1 June ===
List of shipwrecks: 1 June 1911
Ship	State	Description
Fly Away	United States	The 159-gross register ton schooner was stranded on Spruce Island in off the coast of New Brunswick in Canada. All seven people on board survived.

=== 3 June ===
List of shipwrecks: 3 June 1911
Ship	State	Description
North West	United States	The passenger ship caught fire at dock in the City Ship Canal at the foot of Tifft Street, Buffalo, New York. Most everything made of wood in the iron-hulled ship burned. The ship filled by water being pumped onto her by firefighters and sank in shallow water with most of the hull above water. Refloated on 15 June.

=== 6 June ===
List of shipwrecks: 6 June 1911
Ship	State	Description
Bayard	United Kingdom	The sailing ship, in use as a coaling ship in Ocean Harbour, South Georgia, lost her mooring during a severe gale and ran aground on the southern side of the harbor, where her wreck was abandoned.

=== 7 June ===
List of shipwrecks: 7 June 1911
Ship	State	Description
Alida B	United States	The 118-gross register ton canal boat sank in Long Island Sound off Great Captain Island on the coast of Connecticut. The only person on board survived.

=== 9 June ===
List of shipwrecks: 9 June 1911
Ship	State	Description
Plumie E. Smith	United States	The 16-gross register ton schooner was lost in a collision with the screw steamer City of Milford (United States) on the Potomac River off Alexandria, Virginia. Both people on board survived.

=== 10 June ===
List of shipwrecks: 10 June 1911
Ship	State	Description
P. R. R. 720	United States	The barge ran aground in the Taunton River near Dighton, Massachusetts. Later raised and taken to Fall River, Massachusetts

=== 18 June ===
List of shipwrecks: 18 June 1911
Ship	State	Description
Governor Andrew	United States	The 495-gross register ton sidewheel paddle steamer burned at East Boston in Boston, Massachusetts, killing two of the 23 people on board.

=== 22 June ===
List of shipwrecks: 22 June 1911
Ship	State	Description
Bertha	United Kingdom	Coronation of King George V: The out of service 67-foot (20 m), 52-ton auxiliary pilot tender and wreck light vessel was filled with highly flammable materials, towed to the middle of the harbour at Bangor, and burned as part of the local celebrations.

=== 28 June ===
List of shipwrecks: 28 June 1911
Ship	State	Description
Signal	United States	The 475-gross register ton screw steamer was stranded at San Francisco, California. All seven people on board survived.

=== 29 June ===
List of shipwrecks: 29 June 1911
Ship	State	Description
Catherine and Ellen	United States	The 145-gross register ton schooner was lost in a collision with the screw steamer Nacoochee (United States) off Cape Cod, Massachusetts. All 23 people on board survived.

=== Unknown date ===
List of shipwrecks: Unknown date June 1911
Ship	State	Description
Edward Harrigan	United States	The 107-gross register ton canal boat was lost in a collision with an unidentified vessel off Sorel, Quebec. The only person on board survived.

== July ==
=== 1 July ===
List of shipwrecks: 1 July 1911
Ship	State	Description
USS Samar	United States Navy	The gunboat ran aground in mud in the Yangtze off Kichau, China. She broke free of the mud two weeks later without damage and returned to service.
Sonoma	United States	The 1,063-gross register ton schooner sank off Point Reyes, California. All nine people on board survived.

=== 3 July ===
List of shipwrecks: 3 July 1911
Ship	State	Description
Juno	United States	The 13-gross register ton motor vessel burned at Lindenhurst, Long Island, New York. Both people on board survived.

=== 4 July ===
List of shipwrecks: 4 July 1911
Ship	State	Description
Julia and Martha	United States	The 117-gross register ton schooner was stranded at Cuttyhunk, Massachusetts, a total loss. Cargo and some gear was salvaged. All five people on board survived.
Mary	United States	The 27-gross register ton screw steamer burned on the James River in Virginia. All five people on board survived.

=== 5 July ===
List of shipwrecks: 5 July 1911
Ship	State	Description
Uriah Timmons	United States	The 24-gross register ton schooner sank off Springfield Bluff, Georgia. All three people on board survived.

=== 7 July ===
List of shipwrecks: 7 July 1911
Ship	State	Description
Grayling	United States	The 121-gross register ton schooner was stranded on Cape Amalia on the coast of Greenland. All 18 people on board survived.
Lady Ilka	United States	The 25-gross register ton schooner burned at Bay St. Louis, Mississippi. All four people on board survived.
Santa Rosa	United States	The 2,416-gross register ton iron-hulled screw steamer was wrecked at Point Arguello, California in fog, a total loss. A boat overturned with the loss of four lives. There were 278 survivors.

=== 8 July ===
List of shipwrecks: 8 July 1911
Ship	State	Description
Harriet E. Ford	United States	The 50-gross register ton schooner was stranded in the Chesapeake Bay at Love Point Light on the coast of Maryland with the loss of two lives. There was one survivor.
River Queen	United States	The 578-gross register ton sidewheel paddle steamer burned at Washington, D.C. All 15 people on board survived.

=== 9 July ===
List of shipwrecks: 9 July 1911
Ship	State	Description
John Mitchell	United States	The 4,468-gross register ton steel-hulled screw steamer was lost in a collision with the screw steamer W. H. Mack (United States) on Lake Superior off Vermilion Point on the coast of Michigan. Three of the 28 people on board lost their lives.
Kershaw	United States	The steamer went aground on Shovelfull Shoal off Cape Cod.

=== 14 July ===
List of shipwrecks: 14 July 1911
Ship	State	Description
Robert T. Graham	United States	The 70-gross register ton schooner was destroyed by an explosion and fire off Fire Island on the coast of Long Island, New York. All 12 people on board survived.

=== 16 July ===
List of shipwrecks: 16 July 1911
Ship	State	Description
Maine	United States	The 332-gross register ton screw steamer burned at Marine City, Michigan. All 11 people on board survived.

=== 18 July ===
List of shipwrecks: 18 July 1911
Ship	State	Description
Tampa	United States	The 1,972-gross register ton screw steamer was lost in a collision with the screw steamer John W. Gales (United States) on the Detroit River off Walkerville, Ontario, Canada. All 16 people on board survived.

=== 19 July ===
List of shipwrecks: 19 July 1911
Ship	State	Description
Roebuck	United Kingdom	The rail car ferry ran aground after leaving St. Helier. Refloated on 28 July, repaired and returned to service four months later.

=== 20 July ===
List of shipwrecks: 20 July 1911
Ship	State	Description
Magnolia	United States	The 12-gross register ton motor vessel burned on the Delaware River at Paulsboro, New Jersey. Both people on board survived.
Theresa	United States	The 18-gross register ton motor vessel sank off Pico Island in the Azores. All three people on board survived.

=== 22 July ===
List of shipwrecks: 22 July 1911
Ship	State	Description
Alice	United States	The 19-gross register ton schooner sank off Punta de Caballitos, Yabucoa, Puerto Rico. All four people on board survived.

=== 23 July ===
List of shipwrecks: 23 July 1911
Ship	State	Description
Brilliant	United States	The 319-gross register ton barge sank off Fort Adams at Newport, Rhode Island. Both people on board survived.
Dredge Hester	United States	The 206-gross register ton sternwheel paddle steamer burned at Clearwater, Florida. All 19 people on board survived.
Vencedor	United States	The 18-gross register ton sloop-rigged yacht was stranded in Lake Michigan on Fisherman Island off the coast of Michigan. All 10 people on board survived.

=== 24 July ===
List of shipwrecks: 24 July 1911
Ship	State	Description
Elva	United States	The 69-gross register ton schooner was stranded in Sturgeon Bay on the coast of Wisconsin. All four people on board survived.
Romania	United States	The 24-gross register ton motor yacht was stranded at Yarmouth, Nova Scotia, Canada. All five people on board survived.

=== 25 July ===
List of shipwrecks: 25 July 1911
Ship	State	Description
Rappahannock	United States	The 2,380-gross register ton screw steamer sank in Jackfish Bay on the coast of Ontario, Canada, off Lake Superior. All 18 people on board survived.

=== 27 July ===
List of shipwrecks: 27 July 1911
Ship	State	Description
Mersing	Straits Settlements	The 64-ton passenger/cargo ship was sunk in a collision with Kheng Seng (Straits Settlements) in the Strait of Malacca off Pulau Pahat, 30 miles (48 km) north of Singapore. Several survivors were rescued by Kheng Seng from her masts and 31 from the island. Three crew and four passengers were killed. The vessel was declared a total loss at the time she was salvaged in November 1911. She was scheduled to be repaired and returned to service.

=== 28 July ===
List of shipwrecks: 28 July 1911
Ship	State	Description
Almeda Willey	United States	The 547-gross register ton schooner was abandoned off Swan's Island, Maine. All seven people on board survived.
Catawamteak	United States	The schooner ran aground on Peaked Hill bars near Provincetown, Massachusetts.
Henry Chase	United States	The 44-gross register ton schooner was stranded at Port Clyde, Maine. All three people on board survived.
Lewie Warren	United States	The 17-gross register ton motor vessel sank off Cape Cod, Massachusetts, with the loss of all five people on board.
Nokomis	United States	The 32-gross register ton motor vessel sank off Nantucket, Massachusetts, with the loss of five lives. There were four survivors.
Tyre	United States	The 13-gross register ton motor vessel burned at Jacksonville, Florida. Both people on board survived.

=== 29 July ===
List of shipwrecks: 29 July 1911
Ship	State	Description
Eugene H. Cathrall	United States	The 42-gross register ton schooner sank at Ship John Shoal in Delaware Bay. All three people on board survived.
Mary A. Downs	United States	The 12-gross register ton motor vessel was stranded on Vinalhaven Island off the coast of Maine. All five people on board survived.

=== 31 July ===
List of shipwrecks: 31 July 1911
Ship	State	Description
Abbie A. Morton	United States	The 9-gross register ton sloop was stranded on Vinalhaven Island on the coast of Maine. All three people on board survived.

=== Unknown date ===
List of shipwrecks: Unknown date July 1911
Ship	State	Description
Cup Hunter	United States	The 9-gross register ton sloop was stranded on Parris Island on the coast of South Carolina. All three people on board survived.
Virginia C	United States	The 102-gross register ton canal boat was lost in a collision with an unidentified vessel in the Saint Lawrence River off Chambly, Quebec, Canada. The only person on board survived.

== August ==
=== 1 August ===
List of shipwrecks: 1 August 1911
Ship	State	Description
Sirius	United States	The 22-gross register ton screw steamer sank in the Saint Lawrence River off Massena, New York, with the loss of seven lives. There were 48 survivors.

=== 2 August ===
List of shipwrecks: 2 August 1911
Ship	State	Description
Susie	United States	The 25-gross register ton motor paddle vessel sank in the Missouri River at LeBeau, South Dakota. All five people on board survived.

=== 3 August ===
List of shipwrecks: 3 August 1911
Ship	State	Description
Frau Mini Peterson	Norway	The 180-ton schooner was wrecked, after a collision, near the Seven Stones Reef, off the Isles of Scilly, United Kingdom.
Jessie Minor	United States	Carrying a cargo of 200 tons of salt and empty barrels and a crew of 11, the 261-gross register ton, 129-foot (39.3 m) schooner was blown ashore during a gale and wrecked without loss of life in Nelson Lagoon on the Alaska Peninsula in the District of Alaska.

=== 5 August ===
List of shipwrecks: 5 August 1911
Ship	State	Description
Rena	United States	The 42-gross register ton schooner was stranded in Boston Harbor on the coast of Massachusetts. Both people on board survived.

=== 8 August ===
List of shipwrecks: 8 August 1911
Ship	State	Description
F. H. Prince	United States	The 2,047-gross register ton screw steamer burned on Lake Erie off Kelleys Island, Ohio. All 17 people on board survived.
Stephen E. Babcock	United States	The 46-gross register ton screw steamer burned at Bridgeport, Connecticut. All four people on board survived.

=== 9 August ===
List of shipwrecks: 9 August 1911
Ship	State	Description
Eleazer Boynton	United States	The 88-gross register ton schooner was lost in a collision with the screw steamer Camden (United States) in the harbor at Rockland, Maine. All four people on board survived.
Fifeshire	United Kingdom	The ocean liner ran aground 20 nautical miles (37 km) south of Cape Guardafui, Italian Somaliland. Six of her crew took to a lifeboat to seek assistance. They were rescued five days later by Ardandearg (United Kingdom). The 99 passengers and crew later abandoned ship in four lifeboats, the last leaving on 11 August. Survivors from two of the boats were rescued by Adour (France). Twenty-four lives were lost.

=== 10 August ===
List of shipwrecks: 10 August 1911
Ship	State	Description
Sarah D. Fell	United States	The 578-gross register ton schooner was abandoned in the Atlantic Ocean near Cape Fear on the coast of North Carolina. All seven people on board survived.

=== 11 August ===
List of shipwrecks: 11 August 1911
Ship	State	Description
Frances and Louisa	United States	The 27-gross register ton schooner was stranded on Crooked Isle off the coast of Florida. All six people on board survived.
Theresa Wolf	United States	The 307-gross register ton schooner was stranded on Cape Cod on the coast of Massachusetts. All seven people on board survived.

=== 12 August ===
List of shipwrecks: 12 August 1911
Ship	State	Description
Henry H. Stanwood	United States	The 44-gross register ton screw steamer was lost in a collision with the British screw steamer Stephans (United Kingdom) at New York City. All nine people on board survived.
San Giorgio	Regia Marina	The armored cruiser ran aground on a reef in the Tyrrhenian Sea off Naples-Posillipo, Italy and was badly damaged. She was eventually refloated and repaired, but did not rejoin the fleet until June 1912.

=== 15 August ===
List of shipwrecks: 15 August 1911
Ship	State	Description
Priscilla	United States	The 26-gross register ton motor vessel burned at Texas City, Texas. All three people on board survived.

=== 16 August ===
List of shipwrecks: 16 August 1911
Ship	State	Description
SMS T21	Imperial German Navy	The torpedo boat sank after colliding with the torpedo boat SMS T38 (Imperial German Navy).

=== 17 August ===
List of shipwrecks: 17 August 1911
Ship	State	Description
Jennie	United States	The 10-gross register ton sloop was destroyed by an explosion at Staten Island in New York City. Both people on board survived.
Willie H. Child	United States	The 626-gross register ton schooner was stranded on Beach Gull Shoal on the coast of North Carolina. All eight people on board survived.

=== 18 August ===
List of shipwrecks: 18 August 1911
Ship	State	Description
Tourist	United States	The 66-gross register ton sternwheel paddle steamer burned on the Calumet River at Riverdale, Illinois. All four people on board survived.

=== 19 August ===
List of shipwrecks: 19 August 1911
Ship	State	Description
Bertha	United States	The whaling bark went aground on Sow and Pigs Reef off Cuttyhunk Island, Massachusetts.
F. S. Redfield	United States	Carrying a crew of 23 and a cargo of 350 tons of general merchandise, the 469-gross register ton, 159.6-foot (48.6 m) motor cargo vessel was wrecked without loss of life on the coast of the District of Alaska 3 nautical miles (5.6 km; 3.5 mi) east of Cape Prince of Wales after she dragged her anchors during a gale. The revenue cutter USRC Bear ( United States Revenue Cutter Service) rescued her crew on 22 August.

=== 20 August ===
List of shipwrecks: 20 August 1911
Ship	State	Description
J. W. Swayze	United States	The 86-gross register ton sternwheel paddle steamer sank at Jonesville, Louisiana. The only person on board survived.
Wild Duck	United States	The 15-gross register ton motor vessel was lost in a collision with the screw steamer Archie Crossman (United States) in Newark Bay off the coast of New Jersey. All 41 people on board survived.

=== 21 August ===
List of shipwrecks: 21 August 1911
Ship	State	Description
Warrington	United States	The 375-gross register ton screw steamer was stranded at Charlevoix, Michigan. All 12 people on board survived.

=== 24 August ===
List of shipwrecks: 24 August 1911
Ship	State	Description
Lyndhurst	United Kingdom	The full-rigged ship's crew abandoned her off Port Elizabeth, South Africa, after she caught fire. The cruiser HMS Pandora (Royal Navy) subsequently sank her with gunfire.
Tacora	Norway	The schooner was wrecked off Gorontalo, Celebes, Netherlands East Indies.

=== 25 August ===
List of shipwrecks: 25 August 1911
Ship	State	Description
Albert	United States	With no one on board, the 135-gross register ton barge sank in Atchafalaya Bay in Louisiana.
J. N. Harbin	United States	The 142-gross register ton sternwheel paddle steamer was stranded at Lake Landing in the Mississippi River. All 23 people on board survived.
Massachusetts	United States	The 501-gross register ton schooner departed Wiggins, South Carolina, bound for Philadelphia, Pennsylvania, with seven people on board and was never heard from again.

=== 26 August ===
List of shipwrecks: 26 August 1911
Ship	State	Description
Edwina	United States	Charleston-Savannah hurricane: The 459-gross register ton schooner was stranded at Charleston, South Carolina. All seven people on board survived.
James Davidson	United States	Charleston-Savannah hurricane: The 451-gross register ton schooner sank off Charleston, South Carolina. All six people on board survived.
Margaret A. May	United States	Charleston-Savannah hurricane: The 536-gross register ton schooner sank off Kiawah Island on the coast of South Carolina. All 10 people on board lost their lives.
Vixen	United States	The 14-gross register ton motor vessel burned at Silver Springs, Florida. All seven people on board survived.

=== 27 August ===
List of shipwrecks: 27 August 1911
Ship	State	Description
Advance	United States	Charleston-Savannah hurricane: The 27-gross register ton sloop sank off Charleston, South Carolina. All four people on board survived.
Alice	United States	Charleston-Savannah hurricane: With no one on board, the 13-gross register ton motor vessel was stranded at Charleston, South Carolina.
Daniels Island	United States	Charleston-Savannah hurricane: With no one on board, the 18-gross register ton screw steamer sank at Charleston, South Carolina.
Dora	United States	Charleston-Savannah hurricane: The 13-gross register ton sloop sank off Charleston, South Carolina. Both people on board survived.
Emma Sheppard	United States	Charleston-Savannah hurricane: With no one on board, the 8-gross register ton sloop sank at Charleston, South Carolina.
F. S. Redfield	United States	The 469-gross register ton motor vessel was stranded at Cape Prince of Wales on the coast of the District of Alaska. All 23 people on board survived.
Fannie E	United States	Charleston-Savannah hurricane: With no one on board, the 10-gross register ton schooner sank at Charleston, South Carolina.
Franklin Pierce	United States	Charleston-Savannah hurricane: With no one on board, the 36-gross register ton screw steamer sank at Charleston, South Carolina.
Imp	United States	The 20-gross register ton motor yacht sank at Charleston, South Carolina. All three people on board survived.
Janie	United States	Charleston-Savannah hurricane: With no one on board, the 9-gross register ton motor vessel sank at Charleston, South Carolina.
Marietta	United States	Charleston-Savannah hurricane: The 7-gross register ton sloop sank off Charleston, South Carolina. Both people on board survived.
Malcolm B. Seavey	United States	Charleston-Savannah hurricane: On passage from Port Tampa, Florida, to Baltimore, Maryland, with a cargo of phosphate rock, the 1,247 GRT four-masted schooner encountered a hurricane off Cape Romain, South Carolina, on 26 August and foundered on 27 August in 36 ft (11 m) of water. One crew member was swept off the deck and drowned, but the other nine members of the crew were saved by the steamer Mohawk (United States) on 29 August.
Our Fritz	United States	Charleston-Savannah hurricane: With no one on board, the 16-gross register ton sloop sank at Charleston, South Carolina.
S. B. Latham	United States	Charleston-Savannah hurricane: With no one on board, the 10-gross register ton sloop sank at Charleston, South Carolina.
Samuel Brush	United States	Charleston-Savannah hurricane: With no one on board, the 20-gross register ton motor vessel sank at Charleston, South Carolina.
Sophie Amelia K	United States	Charleston-Savannah hurricane: The 47-gross register ton sloop sank off Charleston, South Carolina. All five people on board survived.
Susie Magwood	United States	Charleston-Savannah hurricane: The 19-gross register ton screw steamer sank at Charleston, South Carolina. All five people on board survived.
Thomas Morgan	United States	Charleston-Savannah hurricane: With no one on board, the 52-gross register ton screw steamer sank at Charleston, South Carolina.
Transport	United States	The 164-gross register ton screw steamer sank in Washington Sound off the coast of Washington with the loss of one life. There were 16 survivors.

=== 28 August ===
List of shipwrecks: 28 August 1911
Ship	State	Description
George T. Clark	United States	The 20-gross register ton screw steamer sank off Savannah, Georgia. All four people on board survived.
Ruth E. Godfrey	United States	The 597-gross register ton schooner departed Tocopilla, Chile, bound for Port Townsend, Washington, with nine people on board and was never heard from again.

=== 29 August ===
List of shipwrecks: 29 August 1911
Ship	State	Description
Charles H. Valentine	United States	The 639-gross register ton schooner was stranded on Cape Fear on the coast of North Carolina. All seven people on board survived.
Fannie E. Moffat	United States	The 14-gross register ton motor vessel was stranded at Chadwick, New Jersey. All six people on board survived.
John Rose	United States	The 626-gross register ton schooner was abandoned in the Atlantic Ocean at 33°12′N 77°00′W. All eight people on board survived.

=== 30 August ===
List of shipwrecks: 30 August 1911
Ship	State	Description
Comet	United States	The 429-gross register ton schooner was stranded on San Miguel Island in the Channel Islands off the coast of California with the loss of one life. There were seven survivors.
Josie R. Burt	United States	The 760-gross register ton schooner sank off Barnegat, New Jersey. All nine people on board survived.

=== 31 August ===
List of shipwrecks: 31 August 1911
Ship	State	Description
Rye	United States	The 392-gross register ton barge sank off Point Judith, Rhode Island. The only person on board survived.
W. D. Brimmer	United States	The 334-gross register ton barge sank in Narragansett Bay off the coast of Rhode Island. The only person on board survived.
William D. Brinnier	United States	The barge sank near Saunderstown, Rhode Island, (could be same barge listed above).

== September ==
=== 3 September ===
List of shipwrecks: 3 September 1911
Ship	State	Description
David Faust	United States	The 216-gross register ton schooner was stranded at Port Clyde, Maine. All six people on board survived.

=== 4 September ===
List of shipwrecks: 4 September 1911
Ship	State	Description
Tidy Adly	United States	The 13-gross register ton motor vessel burned in Boston Harbor off the coast of Massachusetts. All three people on board survived.
Tucapel	Chile	The steamship ran aground about 20 miles south of Lima, Peru, killing about 32 people.

=== 5 September ===
List of shipwrecks: 5 September 1911
Ship	State	Description
Papanui	United Kingdom	Papanui The steamship caught fire in the Atlantic Ocean. She was beached at Saint Helena on 11 September. All on board survived.

=== 6 September ===
List of shipwrecks: 6 September 1911
Ship	State	Description
Mary F. Smith	United States	The 33-gross register ton motor vessel was stranded on Green Island in the Tusket Islands off the coast of Nova Scotia, Canada. All nine people on board survived.

=== 8 September ===
List of shipwrecks: 8 September 1911
Ship	State	Description
Iron City	United States	The 118-gross register ton sternwheel paddle steamer was stranded on the Laurie Bar in the Ohio River. All 14 people on board survived.

=== 9 September ===
List of shipwrecks: 9 September 1911
Ship	State	Description
Stephen G. Hart	United States	The barkentine was abandoned in a gale off Cape Henry, Virginia. Reported floating half submerged off the coast of Canada on 24 September. The crew were rescued by Bermudian (flag unknown).

=== 10 September ===
List of shipwrecks: 10 September 1911
Ship	State	Description
Ramona	United States	During a voyage from Hunter Bay in the District of Alaska to Seattle, Washington, with 23 passengers, 52 crewmen, and 405 tons of salmon and general cargo on board, the 1,061-gross register ton, 195-foot (59.4 m) passenger screw steamer went off course in fog and was wrecked on an uncharted reef off Middle Spanish Island (55°57′N 134°07′W) in Christian Sound in Southeast Alaska. All on board survived and were rescued by the steamers Grand, Northwestern, and Delhi (flags unknown).

=== 14 September ===
List of shipwrecks: 14 September 1911
Ship	State	Description
Capt. C. W. Howell	United States	The US Army Corps of Engineers dredge was lost at sea off Texas.
Pontiere	Italian Royal Navy	The Soldato-class destroyer ran aground on a rock off Sardinia. She was refloated, repaired, relaunched on 1 November 1913, and returned to service.

=== 15 September ===
List of shipwrecks: 15 September 1911
Ship	State	Description
Hastings	United States	The 84-gross register ton schooner was lost in the harbor at Rockland, Maine. All three people on board survived.
Youtsey	United States	The 8-gross register ton motor paddle vessel was destroyed by an explosion and fire on the Ohio River at Chilo, Ohio. The only person on board survived.

=== 16 September ===
List of shipwrecks: 16 September 1911
Ship	State	Description
Peggy	United States	The yacht sank on the west side of the Connecticut River off Old Saybrook, Connecticut. Later raised.

=== 18 September ===
List of shipwrecks: 18 September 1911
Ship	State	Description
Harmony	United States	The 96-gross register ton sternwheel paddle steamer was lost when she struck a pier at Lock No. 5 on the Ohio River. All nine people on board survived.
Jessie Minor	United States	The 261-gross register ton schooner was stranded at Nelson Lagoon on the Alaska Peninsula in the District of Alaska. All 11 people on board survived.
Stella B. Kaplan	United States	The 1,078-gross register ton schooner was stranded in the Chesapeake Bay on the coast of Virginia. All nine people on board survived.

=== 19 September ===
List of shipwrecks: 19 September 1911
Ship	State	Description
Eustathius	Imperial Russian Navy	The destroyer ran aground off Constanţa, Romania. She was refloated and taken in to Sevastopol.
Panteleimon	Imperial Russian Navy	The destroyer ran aground off Constanţa. She was refloated and taken in to Sevastopol.

=== 22 September ===
List of shipwrecks: 22 September 1911
Ship	State	Description
Joliet	United States	The 1,935-gross register ton steel-hulled steam screw cargo ship sank while she was anchored off Port Huron, Michigan, in the St. Clair River on the United States-Canada border between Michigan and Ontario, after the steam screw cargo ship Henry Phipps (United States) accidentally rammed her in dense fog. She sank almost directly over the railway tunnel between Sarnia, Ontario, and Port Huron. Wreck later blown up with dynamite to provide clearance for navigation. Remaining wreckage removed by U.S. Army Corps of Engineers in 1963. All 20 people on board survived.

=== 23 September ===
List of shipwrecks: 23 September 1911
Ship	State	Description
Naulahka	United States	With no one on board, the 16-gross register ton motor vessel burned on the Guadalupe River in Texas.

=== 24 September ===
List of shipwrecks: 24 September 1911
Ship	State	Description
Ana Rita	United States	The 7-gross register ton sloop sank off Piñones, Cabo Rojo, Puerto Rico. All four people on board survived.
Séduisante	United Kingdom	All hands lost at Nottingham Island in Arctic Canada.

=== 25 September ===
List of shipwrecks: 25 September 1911
Ship	State	Description
Helen W. Martin	United States	The schooner went aground on Eastern Point near Gloucester, Massachusetts. Later salvaged.
Liberté	French Navy	Liberté The Liberté-class battleship was destroyed by a magazine explosion in Toulon harbor, killing about 300 people.
Stephen G. Hart	United States	The 605-gross register ton schooner was abandoned in the Atlantic Ocean 25 nautical miles (46 km; 29 mi) west of Bermuda. All eight people on board survived.
Thomas Cranage	United States	The 2,219-gross register ton screw steamer was stranded on Watcher Island in Georgian Bay off the coast of Ontario, Canada. All 17 people on board survived.

=== 26 September ===
List of shipwrecks: 26 September 1911
Ship	State	Description
Edna Mae	United States	The 6-gross register ton motor vessel was destroyed by an explosion at Manteo, North Carolina. All 10 people on board survived.
Oliver Mitchell	United States	The 320-gross register ton schooner was lost in a collision with the screw steamer Millinocket (United States) in Long Island Sound near Plum Island off the coast of Long Island, New York. All six people on board survived.
PCS Co. #1 (or P. C. S. Co. No.1)	United States	While under tow from Nome to Cripple River (64°32′N 165°48′W) along the Bering Sea coast of the District of Alaska, the empty 40-gross register ton barge sank about 2 nautical miles (3.7 km; 2.3 mi) offshore in Norton Sound southwest of Cripple River after her towline parted. All four people on board survived.

=== 27 September ===
List of shipwrecks: 27 September 1911
Ship	State	Description
Three Brothers	United States	The 583-gross register ton steam screw cargo ship sprang a leak in heavy weather and sank in Lake Michigan off South Manitou Island. All 14 of her crew were saved.

=== 29 September ===
List of shipwrecks: 29 September 1911
Ship	State	Description
Despatch	Australia	The lighthouse tender struck the pier at Lakes Entrance, Victoria, Australia, and consequently foundered.
Itinerant	United States	The 38-gross register ton schooner was lost in a collision with the barge Keystone (United States) on the Great Wicomico River in Maryland. All four people on board survived.
Morgan	United States	The 51-gross register ton sternwheel paddle steamer burned at Haddux Ferry, Kentucky. All nine people on board survived.
Tokat	Ottoman Navy	Italo-Turkish War: Battle of Preveza: The torpedo boat was shelled, beached, and destroyed by Italian destroyers near Nicopolis, Greece. Nine of the crew were killed, including the captain.
W. C. Kirwan	United States	The 39-gross register ton schooner sank in the Chesapeake Bay off Sandy Point, Maryland. All three people on board survived.

=== 30 September ===
List of shipwrecks: 30 September 1911
Ship	State	Description
Alpagot	Ottoman Navy	Italo-Turkish War: Battle of Preveza: The Akhisar-class torpedo boat was shelled and sunk by Artigliere and Corazziere (both Regia Marina) in the harbour of Preveza, Greece.
Hamidiye	Ottoman Navy	Italo-Turkish War: Battle of Preveza: The Hamidiye-class torpedo boat was shelled and sunk by Artigliere and Corazziere (both Regia Marina) in the harbour of Preveza, Greece.
Swarland	Denmark	The cargo ship disappeared while steaming from Rostock, Germany, to Rotterdam, the Netherlands, with the loss of all 15 crew members.
Trablus	Ottoman Navy	Italo-Turkish War: The armed yacht was lost.

== October ==
=== 1 October ===
List of shipwrecks: 1 October 1911
Ship	State	Description
Ixion	Netherlands	The cargo ship caught fire and sank off the coast of the Netherlands East Indies, killing 24 crew members. Good Hope (United Kingdom) rescued the 24 survivors.

=== 2 October ===
List of shipwrecks: 2 October 1911
Ship	State	Description
A. L. Hopkins	United States	Bound from Bayfield, Wisconsin, for Buffalo, New York, with a crew of 13 and a cargo loaded both in her hold and on deck of 360,000 board feet (850 m^{3}) of lumber and 300,000 board feet (710 m^{3}) of lath, the 174-foot (53 m), 639-gross register ton screw steam barge nearly capsized and became waterlogged when she encountered heavy seas and a rain squall on Lake Superior off Ontonagon, Michigan. One man was washed overboard and one man was alone aboard the ship's lifeboat when it was washed away while the crew attempted to abandon ship, but both survived and managed to get back aboard the partially submerged A. L. Hopkins. The ore carrier Dinkey (United States) rescued the entire crew on 3 October about 15 nautical miles (28 km; 17 mi) northeast of Michigan Island in the Apostle Islands. A. L. Hopkins did not sink for at least two weeks, and was last sighted about 50 nautical miles (93 km; 58 mi) east of Michigan Island by the steamer William F. Corey (United States) on 17 October 1911. Her wreck lies in Lake Superior off Iron County, Wisconsin, at 46°52.463′N 090°18.499′W.
No. 4	Ottoman Navy	Italo-Turkish War: The No. 1-class motor gunboat was lost.

=== 3 October ===
List of shipwrecks: 3 October 1911
Ship	State	Description
Oliver J. Olson	United States	The 667-gross register ton schooner was stranded at Cape False on the coast of the Baja California Peninsula in Mexico. All 10 people on board survived.

=== 4 October ===
List of shipwrecks: 4 October 1911
Ship	State	Description
Jura	United States	The 227-gross register ton schooner was stranded in Lake Michigan near Cross Village, Michigan. All six people on board survived.

=== 6 October ===
List of shipwrecks: 6 October 1911
Ship	State	Description
Occidental	United States	The 22-gross register ton motor vessel burned in Holmes Harbor, an inlet of Saratoga Passage on the coast of Washington. All five people on board survived.

=== 7 October ===
List of shipwrecks: 7 October 1911
Ship	State	Description
Penn	United States	The 476-gross register ton barge sank in Long Island Sound off Race Rock Light. The only person on board survived.

=== 9 October ===
List of shipwrecks: 9 October 1911
Ship	State	Description
Wm. Nottingham	United States	The 1,204-gross register ton schooner was abandoned in the Pacific Ocean off Cape Disappointment, Washington. All 11 people on board survived.
William K. Park	United States	The 1,252-gross register ton schooner was abandoned in the Atlantic Ocean southeast of Newfoundland at 45°N 50°W. All nine people on board survived.

=== 10 October ===
List of shipwrecks: 10 October 1911
Ship	State	Description
M. H. Read	United States	The 160-gross register ton schooner was stranded at Boston, Massachusetts. All five people on board survived.
Perdita	United States	The 286-gross register ton motor vessel burned at the Ludlow Rocks in Washington. All 25 people on board survived.

=== 12 October ===
List of shipwrecks: 12 October 1911
Ship	State	Description
Freccia	Regia Marina	Italo-Turkish War: The Lampo-class destroyer was wrecked at the entrance to the harbor at Tripoli on the coast of Ottoman Tripolitania.

=== 13 October ===
List of shipwrecks: 13 October 1911
Ship	State	Description
E. Hempstead	United States	The 19-gross register ton schooner sank in East Pass on the coast of Florida. All five people on board survived.

=== 17 October ===
List of shipwrecks: 17 October 1911
Ship	State	Description
USLHT Lily	United States Lighthouse Service	The lighthouse tender struck a snag and sank, or was beached, near Washington, Missouri, or Wellington, Missouri, in the Missouri River. Raised, temporary repairs finished by 31 October.
McKinley	United States	The 66-gross register ton screw steamer burned in Wollochet Bay in Puget Sound off the coast of Washington. All four people on board survived.

=== 18 October ===
List of shipwrecks: 18 October 1911
Ship	State	Description
Arundel	United States	The 339-gross register ton iron-hulled screw steamer burned at Douglas, Michigan. All 24 people on board survived.
Mignon	United States	The 14-gross register ton screw steamer burned on the Mississippi River at Rock Island, Illinois. Both people on board survived.

=== 19 October ===
List of shipwrecks: 19 October 1911
Ship	State	Description
Elizabeth E. Vane	United States	The 405-gross register ton barge was lost in a collision with the screw steamer Columbia (United States) in Baltimore Harbor on the coast of Maryland. Both people on board survived.

=== 20 October ===
List of shipwrecks: 20 October 1911
Ship	State	Description
Majestic	United States	The 17-gross register ton motor vessel sank at New Orleans, Louisiana, with the loss of one life. There were eight survivors.

=== 21 October ===
List of shipwrecks: 21 October 1911
Ship	State	Description
Alice Latham	United Kingdom	The schooner was wrecked in a gale at Kilmore. Sold for scrap and later broken up.

=== 23 October ===
List of shipwrecks: 23 October 1911
Ship	State	Description
Western Belle	United States	The barge stranded on Race Rock, Fisher's Island, New York. Pumped out and repaired.

=== 24 October ===
List of shipwrecks: 24 October 1911
Ship	State	Description
Herald	United States	The schooner went on the rocks at the east end of Wicopesset near Fisher's Island. Later pumped out, pulled off and taken to Stonington, Connecticut and Stamford, Connecticut for repairs.

=== 25 October ===
List of shipwrecks: 25 October 1911
Ship	State	Description
George May	United States	The 654-gross register ton schooner was stranded in the Bahamas. All seven people on board survived.

=== 26 October ===
List of shipwrecks: 26 October 1911
Ship	State	Description
Oliver Mitchell	United States	The schooner was sunk in a collision with Millinocket (flag unknown) in Long Island Sound.
Star of the Sea	United States	The 967-gross register ton schooner was stranded on the Florida Reefs off the coast of Florida. All 11 people on board survived.

=== 27 October ===
List of shipwrecks: 27 October 1911
Ship	State	Description
George L. Bass	United States	The 53-gross register ton sternwheel paddle steamer was lost when she struck a snag at Sheppardstown, Mississippi. All 22 people on board survived.
Multnomah	United States	The 312-gross register ton sternwheel paddle steamer was lost in a collision with the screw steamer Iroquois (United States) off Seattle, Washington. All 19 people on board survived.
Winfield S. Shuster	United States	The 1,481-gross register ton schooner was stranded on Isaac Shoal off the coast of Florida. All 11 people on board survived.

=== 28 October ===
List of shipwrecks: 28 October 1911
Ship	State	Description
Willie Wallace	United States	The 22-gross register ton schooner was stranded on the Florida Reefs off the coast of Florida. All three people on board survived.

=== 30 October ===
List of shipwrecks: 30 October 1911
Ship	State	Description
Emily A. Staples	United States	The 86-gross register ton schooner was stranded at Port Clyde, Maine. Both people on board survived.
Flora Condon	United States	The schooner was abandoned after being rammed by schooner Jost (flag unknown) west of Point Judith. She drifted aground on Fisher's Island 29 August 1914.
Sicie	France	The brigantine foundered in the Bristol Channel 2 nautical miles (3.7 km) south of the Helwick Lightship (United Kingdom). She was on a voyage from Swansea, Glamorgan, United Kingdom to Lorient, Morbihan.
Sunbeam	United States	The 255-gross register ton bark was stranded on Sapelo Island on the coast of Georgia. All eight people on board survived.

=== 31 October ===
List of shipwrecks: 31 October 1911
Ship	State	Description
D. Leuty	United States	The 646-gross register ton screw steamer was stranded at Marquette, Michigan. All 13 people on board survived.
Florence	United States	The 14-gross register ton motor vessel was stranded on Annisquam Bar off Gloucester, Massachusetts. All three people on board survived.

== November ==
=== 1 November ===
List of shipwrecks: 1 November 1911
Ship	State	Description
Susan and Mary	United States	The 124-gross register ton schooner was stranded at Point Allerton on the coast of Massachusetts. All 18 people on board survived.

=== 2 November ===
List of shipwrecks: 2 November 1911
Ship	State	Description
Libbie Shearn	United States	The 59-gross register ton schooner was stranded in Aransas Pass on the coast of Texas. All 11 people on board survived.
Lois V. Chaples	United States	The 230-gross register ton schooner sank in Nantucket Sound off the coast of Massachusetts. All five people on board survived.

=== 3 November ===
List of shipwrecks: 3 November 1911
Ship	State	Description
Fairhaven	United States	Fairhaven The sternwheel passenger paddle steamer sank at her moorings in Seattle, Washington. She was refloated, repaired, and returned to service.

=== 5 November ===
List of shipwrecks: 3 November 1911
Ship	State	Description
Antalia	Ottoman Navy	Italo-Turkish War: The Antalya-class torpedo boat was scuttled at Preveze. Salvaged and put in service as Nikopolis (Hellenic Navy).
Tokad	Ottoman Navy	Italo-Turkish War: The Antalya-class torpedo boat was scuttled at Preveze. Salvaged and put in service as Totoi (Hellenic Navy).

=== 6 November ===
List of shipwrecks: 6 November 1911
Ship	State	Description
G. W. North	United States	The 9-gross register ton schooner was lost when she struck an obstruction in Baltimore Harbor on the coast of Maryland. All five people on board survived.

=== 7 November ===
List of shipwrecks: 7 November 1911
Ship	State	Description
Bassein	United Kingdom	The 106-foot (32 m), 153-ton steam trawler sank in a storm in the North Sea.
Dena H	United States	The 13-gross register ton motor vessel burned in Matagorda Bay off Alamo Beach, Texas. All four people on board survived.
Nellie	United States	With no one on board, the 14-gross register ton screw steamer burned at Mobile, Alabama.

=== 9 November ===
List of shipwrecks: 9 November 1911
Ship	State	Description
Eastern Light	United States	The 85-gross register ton schooner was stranded on Pumpkin Rock at Boothbay Harbor, Maine. All three people on board survived.

=== 10 November ===
List of shipwrecks: 10 November 1911
Ship	State	Description
Julia Howard	United States	The barge sank on the southwest side of Shelter Island, New York.

=== 11 November ===
List of shipwrecks: 11 November 1911
Ship	State	Description
City of Kalamazoo	United States	The 729-gross register ton screw steamer burned at Manistee, Michigan. All 22 people on board survived.
Della May	United States	The 7-gross register ton sloop was lost in a collision with the schooner Au Revoir (United States) in Baltimore Harbor off the coast of Maryland. Two of the five people on board lost their lives.

=== 12 November ===
List of shipwrecks: 12 November 1911
Ship	State	Description
A. R. Hall	United States	The 60-gross register ton screw steamer sank off Greenville, Mississippi. All five people on board survived.
Angele		The brigantine ran aground on the Doom Bar, Padstow, Cornwall, United Kingdom.
Bertha F. Walker	United States	The schooner was wrecked on Pasque Island, Massachusetts.
Genia	United States	The 14-gross register ton motor vessel was stranded at Brooklyn, New York. Both people on board survived.
Pottsville	United States	The 72-gross register ton screw steamer burned off Wilson Point, Connecticut. All nine people on board survived.
Samuel J. Goucher	United States	The 2,547-gross register ton schooner was stranded in the Isles of Shoals on Duck Island off the coast of New Hampshire. All 13 people on board survived. Later refloated and became lodged on a breakwater at the Mouth of the Merrimack River. She later broke up with pieces washing ashore on Plum Island where they were buried by wave and tidal action.
Searsport	United States	The 1,159-gross register ton iron-hulled barge sank 1 nautical mile (1.9 km; 1.2 mi) south of Fire Island off the coast of Long Island, New York. All five people on board lost their lives.
Witch Hazel	United States	The 251-gross register ton schooner was stranded outside the west breakwater at New Haven, Connecticut with the loss of three lives. There were three survivors. Later brought inside the breakwater and broken up.

=== 13 November ===
List of shipwrecks: 13 November 1911
Ship	State	Description
Eastern Light	United States	The schooner ran aground on Pumpkin Rock near Boothbay Harbor, Maine, probable total loss. The crew was saved.
Evening Star	United States	The 31-gross register ton motor vessel was stranded on the Missouri River at St. Joseph, Missouri. All seven people on board survived.
Good Templar	United Kingdom	The ketch foundered in a gale in Cardigan Bay. Three crew taken off before she sank by trawler "Lucerne" (United Kingdom).
Reliance	Canada	The schooner ran aground on Cape Fourchu, Yarmouth Sound, Nova Scotia. Refloated, stripped, and broken up. The crew was saved.
Sun	United States	The 8-gross register ton motor paddle vessel was lost in a collision with the sternwheel paddle steamer Katherine (United States) on the Tennessee River at Chattanooga, Tennessee. Both people on board survived.

=== 14 November ===
List of shipwrecks: 14 November 1911
Ship	State	Description
Jordan L. Mott	United States	The 138-gross register ton schooner was stranded and burned at the mouth of the Georges River in Maine. All five people on board survived.

=== 16 November ===
List of shipwrecks: 16 November 1911
Ship	State	Description
Samuel J. Goucher	United States	Carrying a cargo of coal, the 282-foot (86 m), 2,249-gross register ton five-masted schooner ran aground in fog without loss of life on the Northwest Ledges, a reef off Duck Island in the Isles of Shoals off the coast of New Hampshire. After her cargo was unloaded, she was refloated, towed into Portsmouth Harbor, and scrapped.

=== 17 November ===
List of shipwrecks: 17 November 1911
Ship	State	Description
Charles H. Wolston	United States	The 350-gross register ton schooner was stranded at Great Point, Nantucket, Massachusetts. All six people on board survived.
Lomie A. Burton	United States	The 203-gross register ton schooner was stranded in Lake Michigan on South Manitou Island off the coast of Michigan. All six people on board survived.
Wm. A. Young	United States	The 434-gross register ton schooner barge sank in Lake Huron off the coast of Michigan between Middle Island and Thunder Bay Island. All six people on board survived.

=== 18 November ===
List of shipwrecks: 18 November 1911
Ship	State	Description
Abbie and Eva Hooper	United States	The schooner was wrecked on Hedge Fence Shoal, in Vineyard Sound, near Vineyard Haven, Massachusetts. She was stripped by the owners. Removed under a US Army Corps of Engineers contract 22 April–5 May 1914. All three people on board survived.
Henry Willis	United States	The 80-gross register ton schooner sank off Menunketesuck Point, Connecticut, with the loss of two lives. There were two survivors.
Monguagon	United States	The 301-gross register ton schooner sank in the Detroit River in Michigan. Both people on board survived.
Vermont	United States	The 270-gross register ton barge sank in Long Island Sound off Plum Island off the coast of Long Island, New York with the loss of two lives. There was one survivor.

=== 19 November ===
List of shipwrecks: 19 November 1911
Ship	State	Description
Helen A. Wyman	United States	The 1,717-gross register ton schooner barge sank off Montauk Point, Long Island, New York. All four people on board survived.
Kuala	unknown	The cargo ship was wrecked on Ras Halaf Point, Socatra, in the Indian Ocean. Crew rescued by "Meteor" (Russian Empire) on 21 November

=== 20 November ===
List of shipwrecks: 20 November 1911
Ship	State	Description
Joel F. Sheppard	United States	The 567-gross register ton schooner burned at Harborton, Virginia. All seven people on board survived.

=== 21 November ===
List of shipwrecks: 21 November 1911
Ship	State	Description
Isaac Collins	United States	The 98-gross register ton schooner was stranded in Biscayne Bay on the coast of Florida. All nine people on board survived.

=== 23 November ===
List of shipwrecks: 23 November 1911
Ship	State	Description
USLHT Lily	United States Lighthouse Service	The lighthouse tender hit a snag and was beached, or sank, near St. Albans, Missouri 50 miles (80 km) above the mouth of the Missouri River, a total loss. The wreck silted up to the extent that an island has formed known as "Lily Island".
Lorene	United States	With no one on board, the 14-gross register ton sternwheel paddle steamer burned at Fort Snelling in Minnesota.
Minnesota	United States	With no one on board, the 22-gross register ton sidewheel motor paddle vessel burned at Fort Snelling in Minnesota.
Weasel	United States	The 8-gross register ton motor vessel was stranded on Cape Ann on the coast of Massachusetts. All four people on board survived.

=== 24 November ===
List of shipwrecks: 24 November 1911
Ship	State	Description
Hannah F. Carleton	United States	The 225-gross register ton schooner sank on Handkerchief Shoal off the coast of Massachusetts. All five people on board survived.
Joseph G. Ray	United States	The 1,253-gross register ton schooner was stranded in the Chesapeake Bay at Tail of Horseshoe, Virginia. All nine people on board survived.

=== 25 November ===
List of shipwrecks: 25 November 1911
Ship	State	Description
Edward Kelley	United States	The 776-gross register ton schooner was stranded in Lake Erie at Port Colborne, Ontario, Canada. All four people on board survived.
Silver Star	Canada	The schooner was wrecked on Goose Island, New York.

=== 27 November ===
List of shipwrecks: 27 November 1911
Ship	State	Description
Lizzie H. Partrick	United States	The 471-gross register ton schooner was stranded on the Cape Lookout Shoals off the coast of North Carolina. All six people on board survived.

=== 28 November ===
List of shipwrecks: 28 November 1911
Ship	State	Description
Alberta	United States	With no one on board, the 8-gross register ton motor vessel burned at Medleys Landing, Missouri.
Charles A. Gilberg	United States	The 485-gross register ton schooner was abandoned in the Atlantic Ocean 75 nautical miles (139 km; 86 mi) southeast of Cape Henlopen, Delaware. All eight people on board survived.
I. F. Co. No. 1	United States	The 138-gross register ton scow burned at Victoria, British Columbia, Canada. The only person on board survived.
Nautilus	United States	The 9-gross register ton motor vessel burned at Blanchard, Washington. Both people on board survived.
Vashon	United States	The 342-gross register ton sternwheel paddle steamer burned at Victoria, British Columbia, Canada. ALl 12 people on board survived.

=== 30 November ===
List of shipwrecks: 30 November 1911
Ship	State	Description
Hiawatha	United States	The 256-gross register ton sternwheel paddle steamer burned on the Ohio River at Louisville, Kentucky. Both people on board survived.
Raleigh	United States	The 1,205-gross register ton screw steamer sank off Port Colborne, Ontario, Canada, with the loss of three lives. There were 11 survivors.
Trilby	United States	The 80-gross register ton sternwheel paddle steamer burned at Oakland, California. All six people on board survived.

=== Unknown date ===
List of shipwrecks: Unknown date unknown November 1911
Ship	State	Description
Alice R. Lawson	United States	The 121-gross register ton schooner departed Bonne Bay, Newfoundland 18 November, bound for Gloucester, Massachusetts, with either three or eight people on board (sources provides both numbers) and was never heard from again, believed sunk in a gale on 29 December.
General	United States	The tug was rammed and sunk near Detour Village, Michigan in 50 feet (15 m) of water. Raised and repaired in 1919.
Hansy	Norway	The sailing ship was wrecked at Penolver on the eastern side of The Lizard on the coast of Cornwall, United Kingdom. Three men were saved by a lifeboat and the rest were taken off by rocket apparatus.
Southland	United States	With no one on board, the 261-gross register ton sternwheel paddle steamer was stranded on the Oconee River at Dublin, Georgia.

== December ==
=== 1 December ===
List of shipwrecks: 1 December 1911
Ship	State	Description
Carondelet	United States	The 1,368-gross register ton schooner sank off Prince Rupert, British Columbia, Canada. All six people on board survived.
Cometa	Mexico	The cargo-liner was wrecked at Tampico, Mexico. Raised in 1918.
Genevieve Loretta	United States	The 45-gross register ton schooner was stranded on Alacran Reef off the coast of Mexico. All eight people on board survived.
Nathaniel T. Palmer	United States	The 2,440-gross register ton schooner was abandoned in the Atlantic Ocean east-northeast of Bermuda at 32°50′N 062°45′W. All 13 people on board survived.

=== 3 December ===
List of shipwrecks: 3 December 1911
Ship	State	Description
Diamond	United States	The 84-gross register ton sternwheel paddle steamer was destroyed by an explosion on the Ohio River at Avalon, Pennsylvania. Five of the 15 people on board lost their lives.
Westfield	United States	The 458-gross register ton steel-hulled schooner was stranded at Havana, Cuba. All seven people on board survived.

=== 4 December ===
List of shipwrecks: 4 December 1911
Ship	State	Description
Maryland	United States	The 65-gross register ton barge, previously the sidewheel paddle steamer General Slocum, sank without loss of life in the Atlantic Ocean off Ludlam Beach on the southeast coast of New Jersey near Strathmere and Sea Isle City during a storm while carrying a cargo of coal. All four people on board survived.

=== 5 December ===
List of shipwrecks: 5 December 1911
Ship	State	Description
Madagascar	United States	The 112-gross register ton schooner was stranded at Plymouth, Massachusetts. All five people on board survived.
Mary Eliza	United States	The 13-gross register ton schooner was stranded on Garden Key in the Dry Tortugas. All three people on board survived.

=== 6 December ===
List of shipwrecks: 6 December 1911
Ship	State	Description
Chesapeake	United Kingdom	The tanker caught fire and was abandoned in the Atlantic Ocean (40°20′N 48°40′W). She was on a voyage from New York, United States to Algiers, Algeria and Venice, Italy.

=== 9 December ===
List of shipwrecks: 9 December 1911
Ship	State	Description
M. L. Thornton	United States	The 26-gross register ton sternwheel paddle steamer burned on the Ohio River at Letart Township, Ohio. All five people on board survived.
Templemore	United Kingdom	The cargo ship foundered in Ballycastle Bay.

=== 11 December ===
List of shipwrecks: 11 December 1911
Ship	State	Description
Ella May	United States	The 96-gross register ton schooner was stranded at York, Maine, with the loss of one life. There were two survivors.

=== 12 December ===
List of shipwrecks: 12 December 1911
Ship	State	Description
Mooween	United States	The 122-gross register ton schooner was stranded at Great Island, Lunenburg, Nova Scotia, Canada. All 18 people on board survived.
Silicon	United States	The 448-gross register ton bark was stranded on Colorado Reef off the coast of Cuba. All eight people on board survived.

=== 13 December ===
List of shipwrecks: 13 December 1911
Ship	State	Description
Saluto	Norway	The Christiansand barque was wrecked at Cudden Point in Mount's Bay, Cornwall, United Kingdom. The ship was a total loss but the Newlyn lifeboat saved the crew of 13 men. The ship was bound for the West Indies.

=== 15 December ===
List of shipwrecks: 15 December 1911
Ship	State	Description
Clarke Oil Tank No. 2	United States	The 382-gross register ton barge sank in Sabine Pass on the border between Louisiana and Texas. Both people on board survived.

=== 17 December ===
List of shipwrecks: 17 December 1911
Ship	State	Description
Katherine D. Perry	United States	The 1,125-gross register ton schooner was stranded on Cape Charles on the coast of Virginia. All nine people on board survived.

=== 19 December ===
List of shipwrecks: 19 December 1911
Ship	State	Description
J. C. Austin	United States	The canal boat sank at Belle Dock, New Haven, Connecticut.

=== 20 December ===
List of shipwrecks: 20 December 1911
Ship	State	Description
Lee	United States	The 5-gross register ton sloop was lost when she struck a pier at Galveston, Texas. Both people on board survived.

=== 22 December ===
List of shipwrecks: 22 December 1911
Ship	State	Description
Interboro	United States	The 122-gross register ton screw steamer burned at Mount St. Vincent, New York. All five people on board survived.

=== 23 December ===
List of shipwrecks: 23 December 1911
Ship	State	Description
Clarke Oil Tank No. 1	United States	The 304-gross register ton barge was stranded on the coast of Texas in Sabine Pass. Both people on board survived.

=== 26 December ===
List of shipwrecks: 26 December 1911
Ship	State	Description
Charles J. Dumas	United States	The 697-gross register ton schooner was stranded on Pea Island in the Outer Banks of North Carolina. All seven people on board survived.
Teal	United States	The 35-gross register ton sternwheel paddle steamer burned on the Mississippi River at Memphis, Tennessee. Both people on board survived.

=== 27 December ===
List of shipwrecks: 27 December 1911
Ship	State	Description
Grant	United States	The 327-gross register ton iron-hulled screw steamer was stranded in Hecate Strait in British Columbia, Canada. All 40 people on board survived.

=== 28 December ===
List of shipwrecks: 28 December 1911
Ship	State	Description
Madalene Cooney	United States	The 790-gross register ton schooner was lost in a collision with the destroyer USS Warrington (United States) in the Atlantic Ocean 12 nautical miles (22 km; 14 mi) north of Cape Hatteras, North Carolina. All nine people on board lost their lives.
Mary Adelaide Randall	United States	The 1,166-gross register ton schooner was stranded on Block Island off the coast of Rhode Island. Wreck later removed. All nine people on board survived.
Thistleroy	United Kingdom	The cargo ship wrecked off Cape Lookout, North Carolina a total loss.

=== 29 December ===
List of shipwrecks: 29 December 1911
Ship	State	Description
James B. Jordan	United States	The 722-gross register ton schooner departed Norfolk, Virginia, bound for Paramaribo, Surinam, with seven people on board and was never heard from again.

=== 31 December ===
List of shipwrecks: 31 December 1911
Ship	State	Description
Annabell King	United States	The 86-gross register ton sternwheel paddle steamer was lost when she struck a pier on the Tennessee River at Knoxville, Tennessee. All eight people on board survived.
Mary E. Eskridge	United States	The 378-gross register ton schooner was stranded at Big Kinnekeet, North Carolina. All six people on board survived.
Mary Farrow	United States	The 99-gross register ton schooner sank in Nantucket Sound off the coast of Massachusetts. All five people on board survived.

=== Unknown date ===
List of shipwrecks: Unknown date unknown December 1911
Ship	State	Description
Alice R. Lawson	United States	The 121-gross register ton schooner departed Bonne Bay, Newfoundland on 18 November, bound for Gloucester, Massachusetts, with either three or eight people on board (sources provides both numbers) and was never heard from again, believed sunk in a gale on 29 December.

== Unknown date ==
List of shipwrecks: Unknown date 1911
Ship	State	Description
HMS A1	Royal Navy	The A-class submarine sank in Bracklesham Bay off Sussex, England, while running submerged but unmanned under automatic pilot.
Amisia	Germany	The steamship was driven ashore at Sully Island, Glamorgan, United Kingdom. Her crew survived.
C. F. Bielman	United States	The steamer was abandoned at Port Huron, Michigan as unseaworthy, eventually sinking. Refloated in 1917 and converted into a barge.
Elanora	United States	The 11-gross register ton sidewheel motor paddle vessel burned on the Little Kanawha River in West Virginia. All three people on board survived.
HMS Ferret	Royal Navy	The decommissioned destroyer was sunk as a target.
Howard	United States	While attempting to conduct salvage operations on the wreck of the steamer Roda, the steam tug dragged her anchor during a gale and was wrecked off Jones Beach Island off the south coast of Long Island, New York. Her crew of nine survived.
Kings County	Canada	The four-masted barque was wrecked in the River Plate in South America.
LaFrance	United States	During a river voyage from Fairbanks, District of Alaska, to Dawson City, Yukon Territory, Canada, the steamer was lost when she struck a rock at Twelve Mile Point in central Alaska in the spring of 1911. A fire destroyed her soon afterward.
