= Dauntless (steamboat) =

Steamer in the Puget Sound mosquito fleet, USA

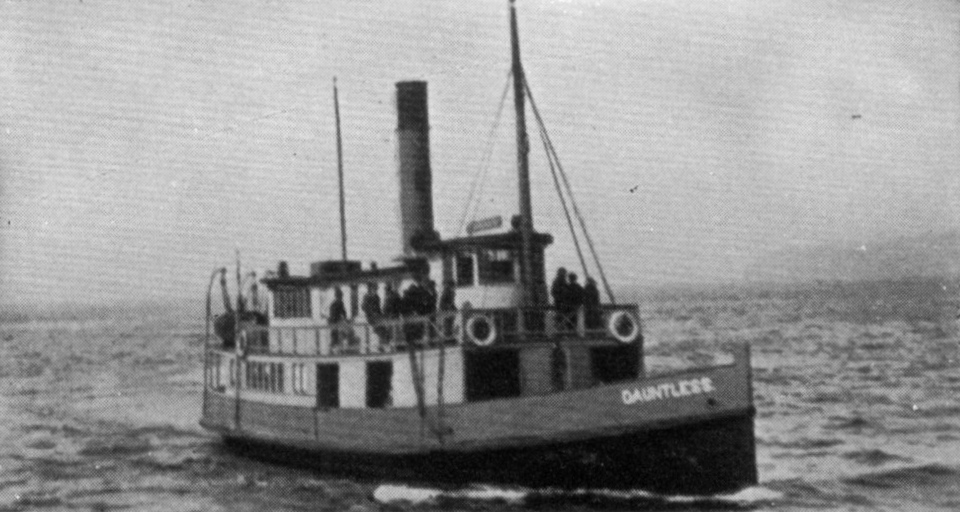
- Dauntless

History
- Name: Dauntless
- Owner: McDowell Trans. Co.; Moe Bros.
- Route: Puget Sound
- Completed: 1899
- Out of service: 1923
- Fate: Wrecked.

General characteristics
- Tonnage: 91
- Length: 93 ft (28.3 m)
- Installed power: steam engine
- Propulsion: propeller

The steamboat Dauntless operated in the early 1900s as part of the Puget Sound Mosquito Fleet.

== Career ==
Dauntless was built in 1899 by Matthew McDowell at Tacoma to replace the Defiance (I) on the Seattle-Tacoma-East Pass run. Dauntless was 93' long and rated at 91 tons.

In 1900, Captain McDowell built a newer and larger Defiance (II) at Tacoma, and sold Dauntless to the Moe Brothers, who put the vessel in the Bainbridge Island service.

In 1902, the Moe Brothers sold Dauntless to L.B. Hastings and Captain Mann, of Port Townsend. They put Dauntless on the Port Townsend-Irondale run. A steel mill at Irondale caused that town to boom, and Dauntless, still capable of 11-knot speed, made quick trips on this route.

On December 30, 1923, a storm caused Dauntless to break loose from her moorings at Appletree Cove. The vessel was blown across the sound and washed up on the beach at Meadow Point, breaking up on the beach.

== See also ==
- Matthew McDowell
