= Island Princess =

Island Princess may refer to:

- The Island Princess, a play by John Fletcher
- SS Island Princess, a steamboat operated by Canadian Pacific Railway in the early 1900s
- MS Island Princess (1971), a cruise ship operated by Princess Cruises from 1974 to 1999
- MS Island Princess (2002), a cruise ship operated by Princess Cruises starting in 2003.
- The Island Princess (film), a 1954 Italian-Spanish comedy film directed by Paolo Moffa
