= Glen Acres =

Glen Acres may refer to:

- Glen Acres, New Mexico, USA
- Glen Acres, Washington, USA
