= Matthew McDowell =

Steamboat owner and builder (1850–1944)

Matthew McDowell, at 94 years of age.

Matthew McDowell (1850-1944) was a steamboat owner and builder associated with the Puget Sound Mosquito Fleet which operated around Washington state, US.

== Background ==
McDowell was born on February 18, 1850, to Matthew McDowell and Mary Jane Young in Eden, County Antrim, Ireland, and was one of 9 siblings. He left home at age 15 to work as a coal passer for steamers on the Anchor Line.

He later had three sons and one daughter, all of whom were associated with his steamboat business. His three sons, Albert (George Alexander), Robert, and John served as engineers and eventually all qualified as masters. His daughter Mary acted as purser and later married Arthur Thompson, who became a well-known Puget Sound pilot.

== Early shipping activities ==
In the early 1890s, McDowell operated the propeller steamer Quickstep, built at Astoria, Oregon in 1877, as a towboat on Puget Sound.

McDowell's fleet was originally based in Tacoma, near the smelter. He often slept on one of his boats, especially if he was to be its captain the following morning. Once a vessel he was sleeping in was nearly run down by a large steamer.

== House and dock near Browns Point Lighthouse ==
In 1905 McDowell bought 80 acres (320,000 m^{2}) of land on Brown's Point, where he built a house and dock near the lighthouse. He called his new home Caledonia, after the poetic name for Scotland. His boats served landings Dumas Bay, Lakota, Adelaide, Redondo, Des Moines, Zenith, Maury, Portage, Chautauqua, Vashon Island, Tacoma and Seattle. As the permanent population and the summer vacationers increased, his business thrived. He later built a dance hall next to his dock, and transported patrons to it on the D fleet steamers.

== The D Fleet ==
In 1897, McDowell built his first boat. Defiance (I), at Caledonia, near Tacoma. She was 60.5 feet (18.4 m) long and rated at 85 tons.

Defiance (I) was the first of six steamboats launched by McDowell, all given names beginning with the letter "D" and all built at the Crawford and Reid shipyard. In each case, McDowell took personal charge of the construction.

Boats built or reconstructed by McDowell for his "D Fleet" included

- Defiance (I)
- Dove ex-Typhoon, built 1889, and later reconstructed following acquisition by McDowell;
- Dauntless, built 1899,
- Defiance (II), built 1901
- Daring, later Clinton, built 1909
- Dart, built 1911
- Daily later Island Princess and ferry Cy Peck, built 1912

The D Fleet also is reported to have operated Monticello (built 1906).

== Later years ==
Anticipating the decline in passenger business as the demand grew for automobile ferries, McDowell began selling his fleet in 1918 while steamers were still in demand. He retired from the steamer service in August 1919. He died in Tacoma on December 15, 1944 at the age of 94.
