= Quickstep (steamboat) =

19th-century American steamboat

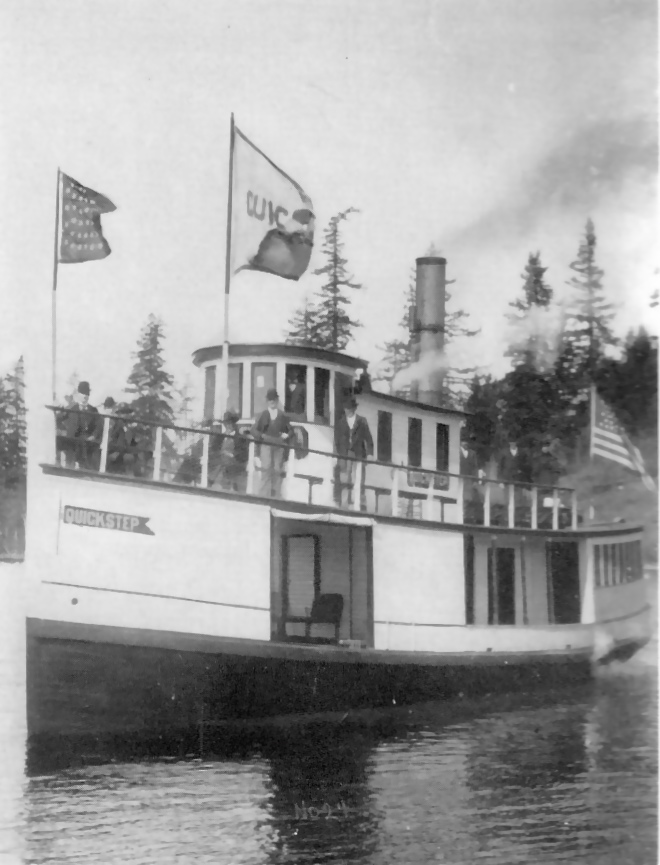
- Quickstep

History
- Name: Quickstep
- Owner: Hansen Trans. Co.; many others
- Route: lower Columbia River, coastal Washington Terr., Puget Sound, Lake Washington.
- Completed: 1877
- Out of service: 1897
- Fate: Burned, engines salvaged, installed in Lady of the Lake.

General characteristics
- Type: Inland and coastal steamboat
- Tonnage: 11.89 regist.
- Propulsion: propeller

Quickstep was a steamboat that operated from 1877 to 1897 in coastal, inland waters and rivers of the Pacific Northwest. This vessel should not be confused with a number of other vessels with the same name, some of which operated in the same area about the same time.

== Career ==
Quickstep was built at Astoria and completed in 1877. The vessel ran on the lower Columbia River for some time. There were many owners and operators of Quickstep and the vessel was run on many different routes.

In July 1883, Quickstep, under Capt. Thomas Doig, was brought north from the Columbia River to Puget Sound. Apparently Quickstep had been returned to the Columbia River after that, as it is reported that about 1885, under Capt. George A. Whitcomb (1854–1939), a member of a prominent maritime family, the vessel was running between Astoria and Grays Harbor.

Quickstep is reported to have been transferred to Puget Sound in 1887, or as early as 1885, by being purchased by Capt. J.J. Hansen (later to form Hansen Transportation Company, who had moved from Minnesota to Tacoma, and decided to enter the steamboat business, with Quickstep being his first vessel.

For a short time in the early 1890s, Quickstep is reported to have been operated by Matthew McDowell for towing operations in the Tacoma area. There is also a report that Quickstep was sold by the Hansens in 1893 so they could replace it with a newer vessel, the Hattie Hansen.

In 1894, Capt. Charles F. Kraft (b. 1831) bought Quickstep and brought the vessel to Lake Washington. In 1896, Capt. John L. Anderson bought Quickstep for $1,600 as a replacement for his steamer Winnifred, which had burned in early 1896.

== Loss by fire ==
On 3 January 1897 Quickstep in turn was lost by fire. Anderson was able to salvage the machinery and install it in a new steamer which he built himself, Lady of the Lake and launched in 1897.
