= Steamboats of Grays Harbor and Chehalis and Hoquiam Rivers =

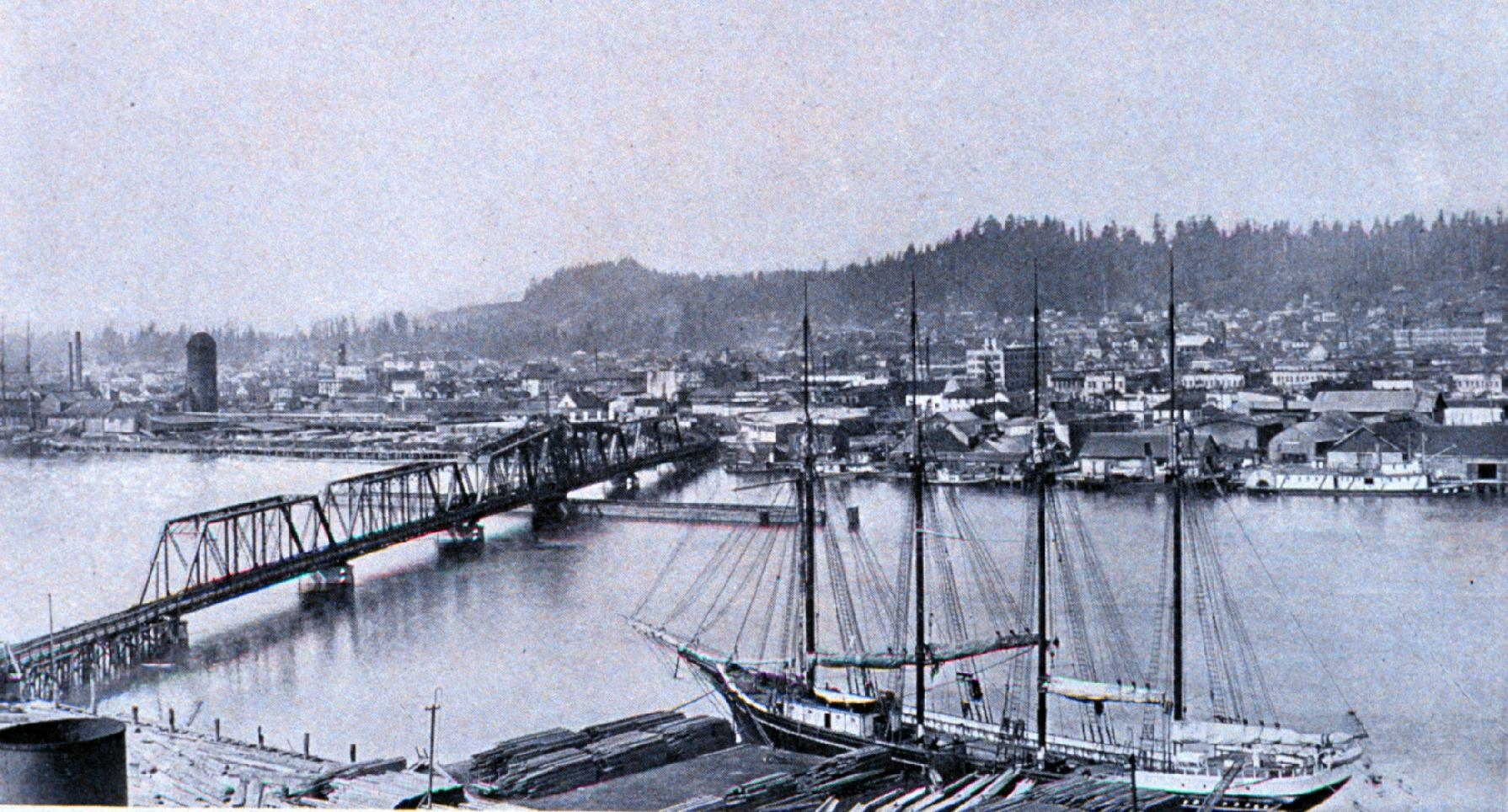
Waterfront of Aberdeen, Washington in 1912, along the Chehalis River, showing a four-masted schooner loading lumber, and on the north side of the river, a sternwheeler moored at a dock

Steamboats operated on Grays Harbor, a large coastal bay in the State of Washington, and on the Chehalis and Hoquiam rivers which flow into Grays Harbor near Aberdeen, a town on the eastern shore of the bay.

== Establishment of operations ==
The first riverine steamboat to operate in the Grays Harbor area was the Enterprise, originally built in 1855 above Willamette Falls, at Canemah (now a part of Oregon City). Enterprise served on the Willamette River until 1858, when she was sent to the Fraser River in British Columbia where gold had been discovered. The Fraser Canyon Gold Rush was short-lived but lucrative for steamboat operators (Enterprise once made $25,000 in a single day), and when it ended, Enterprise was brought to Grays Harbor, where she was wrecked in 1862 on the Chehalis River.

In 1887, Henry H. McDonald, originally from Nova Scotia, arrived in the area and entered the steamboat business. Steamboats owned by Captain McDonald included the tug Pilot and the sternwheeler Clan McDonald. Another sternwheeler operating in these waters was the T.C. Reed.

In about 1891, Dove served briefly on Grays harbor under George Emerson before being sold to Puget Sound interests.

== Photo gallery ==
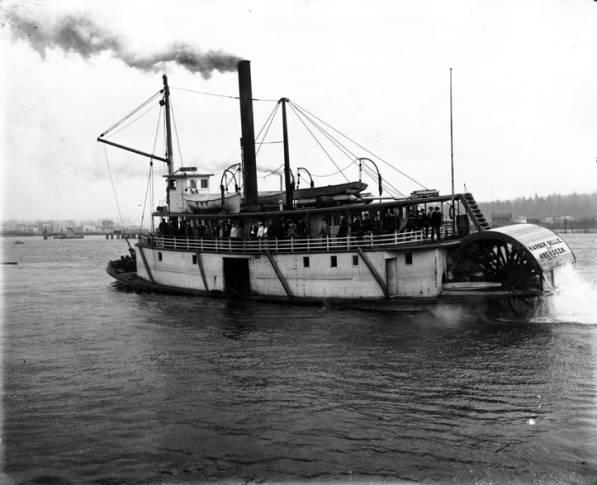
Harbor Belle, sternwheeler, c. 1902.

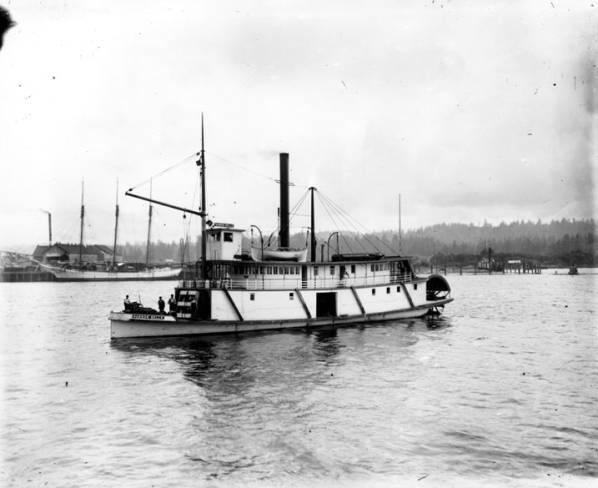
Another view of Harbor Belle

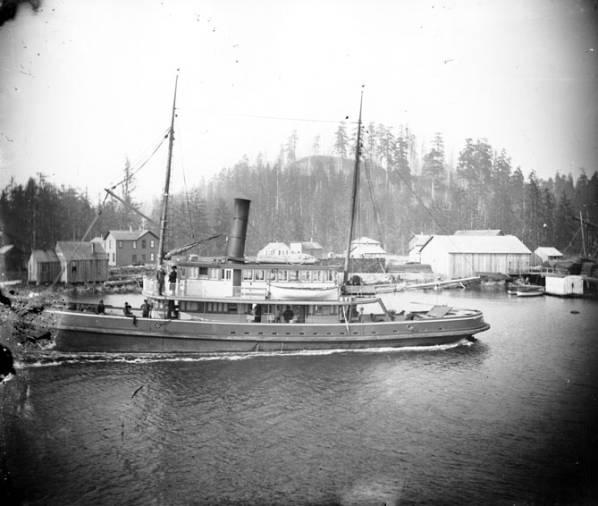
Cruiser, Grays Harbor propeller steamer, c. 1900.

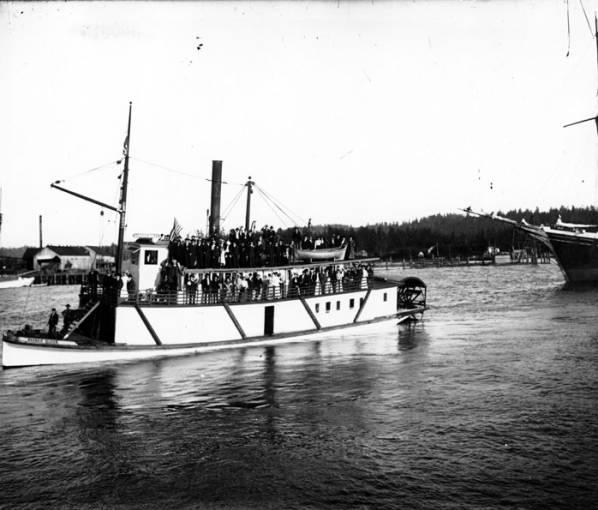
Harbor Queen, c. 1900.

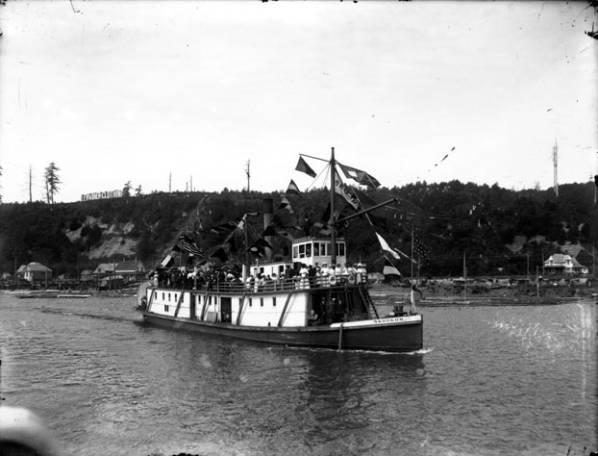
Skookum, sternwheeler c. 1907.

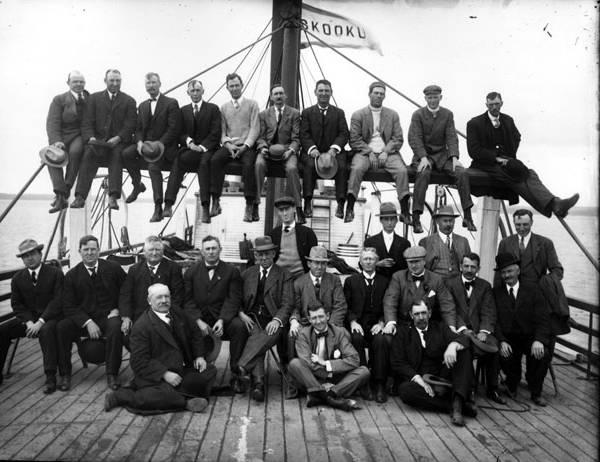
Excursion of sawmill and logging convention attendees on Skookum, 1911.

== See also ==
- Steamboats of Willapa Bay
