= Defiance (steamboat) =

Steamboat in Puget Sound mosquito fleet

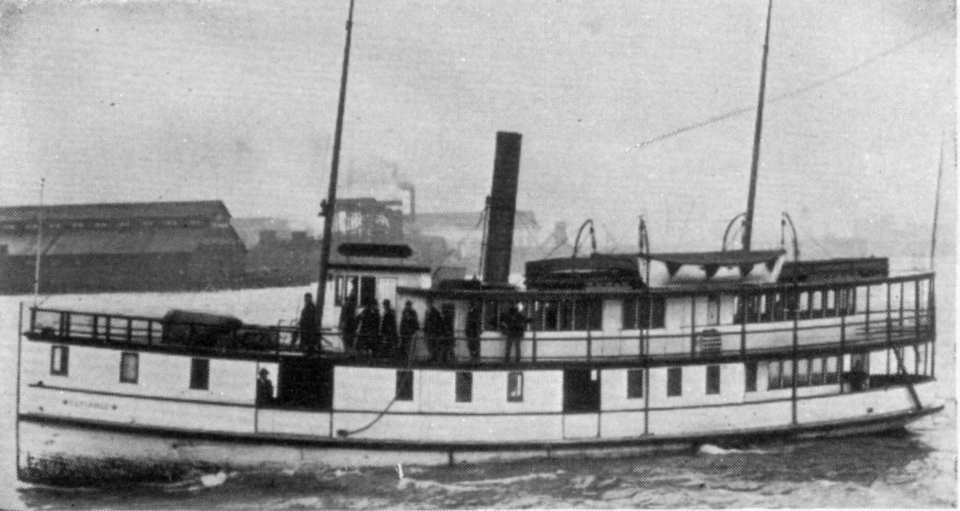
- Defiance (later Kingston)

History
- Name: Defiance (Kingston)
- Owner: McDowell Trans. Co.; others
- Route: Puget Sound
- Completed: 1901
- Out of service: 1933
- Fate: Wrecked.

General characteristics
- Tonnage: 91
- Length: 93 ft (28.3 m)
- Installed power: steam engine; diesel in 1933
- Propulsion: propeller

The steamboat Defiance operated in the early 1900s as part of the Puget Sound Mosquito Fleet. In later years this vessel was called Kingston.

== Career ==
Defiance was built in 1901 by Matthew McDowell at Tacoma to replace the Dauntless on the Seattle-Tacoma-West Pass run. (McDowell sold Dauntless to the Moe Brothers to run on their Bainbridge Island route.). Defiance was 93' long.

Defiance originally ran in the Seattle-Tacoma-West Pass route. The steamer Glide also served this route as did later the Virginia V. In about 1913, Defiance was sold to the Kingston Transportation Company, which renamed her Kingston and put her on a route between Ballard, Washington and Kingson.

By about 1923, Kingston (ex-Defiance) had come under the ownership of the Whidby Island Transportation Company, run by Captain F.G. Reeve and associates, and doing business as the Washington Route. The Washington Route operated Kingston and another steamer, F.G. Reeve, from Seattle to Chico, Silverdale and other points on the Kitsap Peninsula and Bainbridge Island. Captain Reeve also placed Kingston and another steamer, Atalanta, on the Seattle-Coupeville route, this was in the fall of 1923. In 1932, Kingston was sold by the Washington Route to Captain Charles West and others.

In 1933, Kingston was converted to diesel and outfitted with refrigerated compartments to run in the southeastern Alaska trade. On May 20, 1933, on her first voyage north, Kingston (ex-Defiance) was wrecked in the Whitestone Narrows near Sitka and became a total loss.

== See also ==
- Matthew McDowell
- Puget Sound Mosquito Fleet
