= Daring (1909 steamboat) =

American steamboat

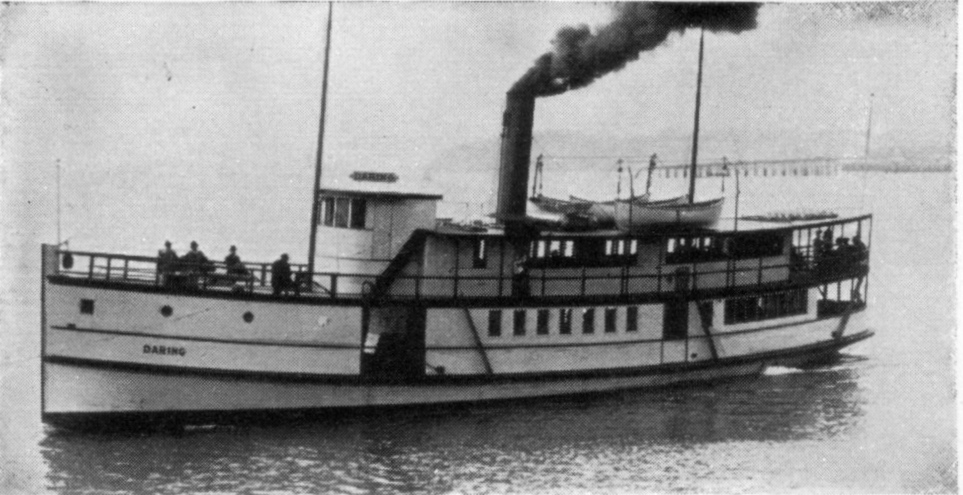
- The steamboat Daring operated in the early 1900s as part of the Puget Sound Mosquito Fleet and was later converted into a tug.

History
- Name: Daring
- Operator: Chesley Tug Co.
- Route: Seattle-Tacoma-East Pass
- Builder: Crawford and Reid
- Laid down: 1909
- Launched: 1909
- Out of service: 15 January 1922
- Fate: Sunk in collision 15 January 1922

General characteristics
- Type: Tugboat
- Tonnage: 163 GRT
- Length: 98 ft (29.9 m)

Daring was a steamboat constructed in Tacoma, Washington in 1909. The vessel was later renamed Clinton and used as a tugboat. Clinton was rammed and sunk in 1922 in Burrard Inlet.

== Construction ==
Daring was built at Tacoma in 1909 by the shipyard of Crawford and Reid for Matthew McDowell's Seattle-Tacoma-East Pass route. Daring was 98 feet (30 m) long and rated at 163 gross register tons (GRT).

== Later operations ==
From 1916 to 1918, Daring was operated as a tug by Chesley Tug Co. out of Seattle, and was then sold to Pacific Great Eastern Railway, Victoria, British Columbia and renamed Clinton. On 15 January 1922 the tug Clinton was rammed and sunk by Canadian Pacific Railway ferry Princess Royal in Burrard Inlet.
