= Dart (steamboat) =

Ship in the Puget Sound Mosquito Fleet

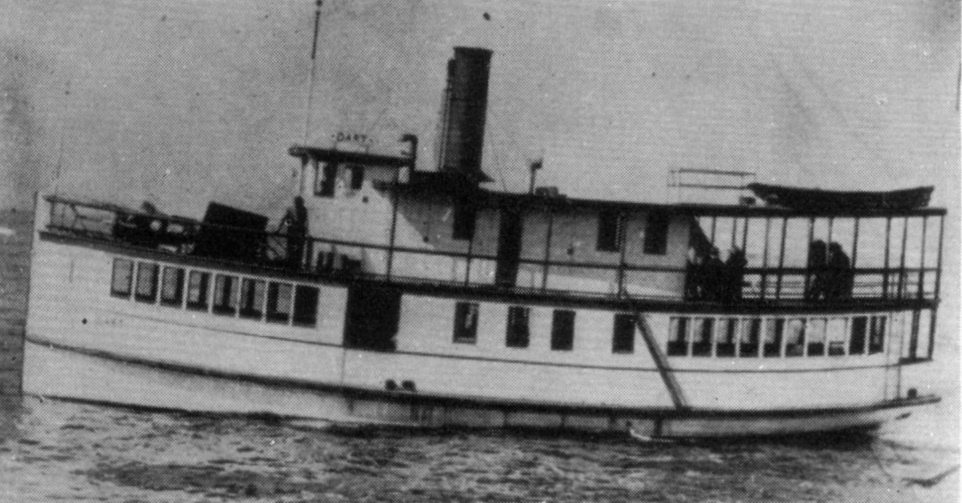
- Dart

History
- Name: Dart
- Operator: McDowell Trans. Co.; Anderson Tug; others.
- Route: Puget Sound
- Completed: 1911

General characteristics
- Tonnage: 74
- Length: 57 ft 4 in (17.5 m)
- Beam: 17 ft 4 in (5.3 m)
- Depth: 5 ft 2 in (1.6 m) depth of hold
- Installed power: steam engine
- Propulsion: propeller

The steamboat Dart operated in the early 1900s as part of the Puget Sound Mosquito Fleet.

== Career ==
Dart was built in 1911 by Matthew McDowell at Tacoma for his steamboat line's Seattle-Tacoma-East Pass run. Dart a small vessel even by Mosquito Fleet standards.

Dart ran on the Seattle-Tacoma-East Pass route until about 1918, when Captain McDowell sold her to the Wrangell concern of W.T. Hale and P.C. McCormick, who converted Dart to a motor vessel to run mail between Wrangell and Prince of Wales Island. Later, he sold Dart to Paul S. Charles of Ketchikan interests.

In 1925 the Anderson Tug Company purchased Dart and returned her to Puget Sound to operate as a tug. In 1928 Dart burned on the Sound while awaiting scrapping. Her engines were salvaged and placed in the ferry City of Mukilteo. Her hull, still good apparently, was rebuilt as a diesel freighter and sent to work routes out of Juneau.

== See also ==
- Matthew McDowell
- Puget Sound Mosquito Fleet
