= Echo (steam tug) =

Steam tugboat

- Steam tugboat Echo

History

United States
- Name: Echo
- Owner: 1900: Captain O. G. Olson; 1916: Foss Launch and Tug Company
- Builder: Crawford and Reid, Tacoma
- Out of service: 3 January 1938
- Identification: USA official number 136791

General characteristics
- Type: Tugboat
- Tonnage: 56 GT; 38 NT
- Length: 66.5 ft (20.3 m)
- Beam: 18.2 ft (5.5 m)
- Depth: 7.3 ft (2.2 m)
- Installed power: 175 ihp
- Propulsion: 1 × screw; 1 × marine steam engine

The steam tug Echo operated in the early 1900s on Puget Sound.

== Construction ==
Echo was built at Tacoma in 1900 by Crawford and Reid for Captain O. G. Olson. Echo was propeller-driven and 66.5' long.

== Operation ==
On August 16, 1906, the Foss gasoline-powered launch Lion caught fire in Commencement Bay, when a fuel valve mistakenly left open had spilled 30 gallons of gasoline into her bilges, which was ignited by the engine backfiring. Echo pumped water on board Lion until the fire was out, while a boat from the cutter Grant took off her crew and passengers.

== Purchase by Foss Launch & Tug Co. ==
In 1916, Foss Launch and Tug Company bought Captain O.G. Olson's Tacoma towing business, including the steam tugs Echo, Elf, and Olympian. In 1921, Perry Moore became Echo ‘s chief engineer. Foss continued to operate Echo until 1930, when she was laid-up at the company's yard in Seattle. In 1938, Echo was described as unfit for further service, her documentation was abandoned, and she was reported to have been burned for scrap near Shilshole Bay.

== See also ==
- Echo (sternwheeler 1865)
- Echo (sternwheeler 1901)
