= USS Locust (1910) =

Tugboat of the United States Navy

History

United States
- Name: USS Locust
- Namesake: Locust
- Builder: Crawford & Reid, Tacoma, Washington
- In service: 5 April 1910
- Out of service: 6 January 1912
- Stricken: 6 January 1912
- Fate: Sold 6 January 1912

General characteristics
- Type: Tugboat
- Length: 80 ft 9 in (24.61 m)
- Beam: 16 ft 3 in (4.95 m)
- Propulsion: Marine steam engine

USS Locust was a tugboat built for the United States Navy in 1910 and served on the U.S. West Coast for several years towing coal barges from Tiburon, California to naval activities where the coal was needed.

== Service history ==
The first ship to be so named by the Navy, Locust—a wooden tug—was built for the Navy by Crawford & Reid.Tacoma, Washington, and placed in service on 5 April 1910. Attached to the Naval Coal Depot, Tiburon, California, the tugboat served at that place, towing coal barges to naval installations along the northwest Pacific Ocean coast. Locust was struck from the Naval Vessel Register on 6 January 1912 and sold.
