= Monticello (steamboat) =

1906 steamboat in United States

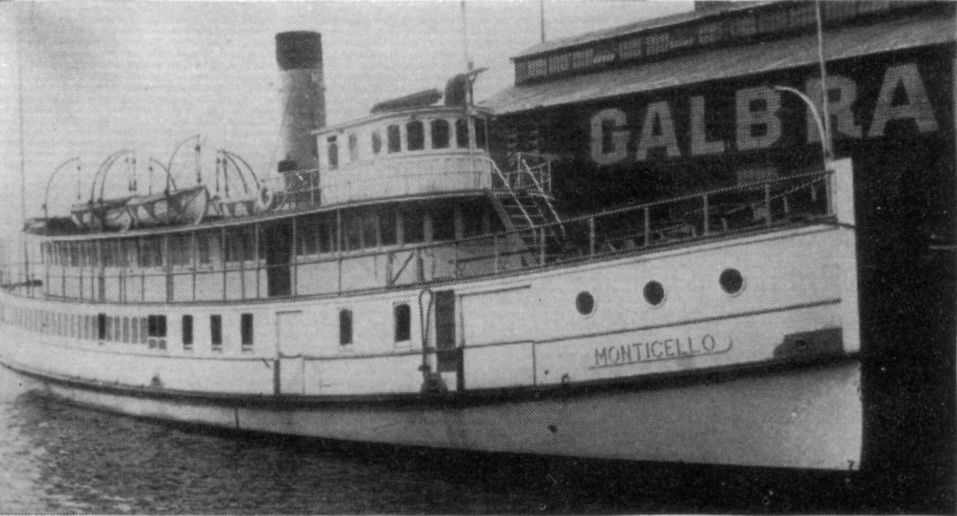
- Monticello, steamship built 1906.

History
- Name: Monticello (2)
- Owner: Moe Bros., Port Blakeley Mill Co., Kitsap County Trans. Co.; Peninsula Transportation Co.; McDowell Trans. Co.
- Operator: Matthew McDowell for a time
- Route: Puget Sound and Strait of Juan de Fuca (after 1936 conversion to freighter)
- Builder: Crawford and Reid shipyard at Tacoma
- Completed: 1906
- In service: 1906
- Out of service: 1962
- Fate: Foundered off Aleutian Islands
- Notes: Renamed Penaco in 1936

General characteristics
- Tonnage: 196 tons
- Length: 125 ft (38 m)
- Beam: 21 ft (6 m)
- Depth: 6.3 ft (2 m) depth of hold
- Installed power: steam engine
- Propulsion: propeller-drive
- Notes: Converted to diesel power 1936

The steamboat Monticello (2) operated in the early 1900s as part of the Puget Sound Mosquito Fleet. The vessel went through several reconstructions and remained in service until 1962, when she was lost in Alaska waters. Her later names were Penaco and Sea Venture. This Puget Sound steamer should not be confused with the smaller Monticello (1), which also ran on Puget Sound, but was built in 1895 for Captain Z.J. Hatch of the Monticello Steamship Company.

== Construction ==
Monticello was built in 1906 by the Crawford and Reid shipyard at Tacoma for the Moe Brothers to run her with their other boat, Advance, in opposition to the Kitsap County Transportation Company’s boats on the Seattle-Poulsbo route. Monticello was 125' long, 21 on the beam, drew 6.3 feet (1.9 m) and was rated at 196 tons.

== Operations ==
Late in the year 1906, Monticello under the command of Capt. Chris Moe, collided with her chief rival, Kitsap, under Captain Alf Hostmark. Following an investigation, both masters were censured by marine inspectors Whitney and Turner (who, apparently coincidentally, had been present in Portland, Oregon earlier that year at the launching of Kitsap.) Monticello seems to have been operated out of Seattle from the Galbraith Dock (Pier 3), the so-called "Mosquito Fleet" dock.

=== Sale to Port Blakely Mill Co. ===
In January 1907, Moe Bros. sold both Monticello and Advance to the Port Blakeley Mill Co., which used them to replace the Sarah M. Renton. In 1908, the company put Monticello on the popular Navy Yard (Seattle-Bremerton)route, running in opposition to the Puget Sound Navigation Company’s steamers Athlon, Tourist, and Inland Flyer. Gasoline-engined vessels were mounting a serious challenge to steam power at about this time, and gasoline power seemed to be vindicated when in 1912 Monticello broke down and had to be towed into Seattle by the gasoline tug Klickitat.

=== Operation with D Fleet ===
One source reports that Monticello was operated by Capt. Matthew McDowell as part of his D Fleet of steamers, but provides no further information.

=== Sale to Kitsap County Transportation Co. ===
In 1922, Port Blakeley Mill sold Monticello to their former competitor Kitsap County Transportation Company with the objective of forming a jointly-operated fast passenger ferry from Seattle to Bainbridge Island, where the mill company's owners, D.E. Skinner and John W. Eddy, owned 1,600 acres (6.5 km^{2}) which they were hoping to develop. Monticello was replaced on the Seattle-Port Blakeley route in 1923 with the automobile ferry Liberty.

=== Later career and union charter ===
In 1930, Puget Sound Freight Lines obtained an option on Monticello to operate her on the Bellingham-San Juan Islands-Seattle route with the steamer Mohawk, but the business wasn't sufficient to sustain two large passenger vessels, so the diesel vessel Suquamish was assigned to run from the San Juans to Bellingham where travelers bound for Seattle could board the Mohawk for Seattle.

For eleven months in 1932 to 1933, Monticello was chartered by maritime unions during a long wage dispute so that union men could ride on a union boat from Seattle to their jobs at the Navy Yard and still boycott the Puget Sound Navigation Company, then the biggest private inland shipping concern on the Sound. Virginia V also was chartered by the unions for a similar role. By this time, Monticello’s steam power plant was in a state of deterioration. Her boiler tubes were leaking, and the engineering crew hit on the idea of putting horse manure in the feedwater to stop the leaks. This actually worked, although one of her all-union crew had to carry the burden of collecting horse manure along the waterfront and bringing it back to the boat.

== Conversion to motor freighter ==
In 1936, Monticello was converted to diesel power using a Fairbanks-Morse power plant and rebuilt as the freighter Penaco. As Penaco, she ran between Tacoma, Seattle, Port Townsend, Port Angeles and way ports under the ownership of the Peninsula Transportation Co., a firm consisting of Capts. O. Joyce, E.M. Fosse, and others.

== Loss ==
Penaco (ex Monticello) lasted a long time. By 1962, she was in service out of Seattle as the crab fishing vessel Sea Venture, and under that name in March 1962 she foundered off the Aleutian Islands.
