= Dove (steamboat) =

Historic steamboat in United States

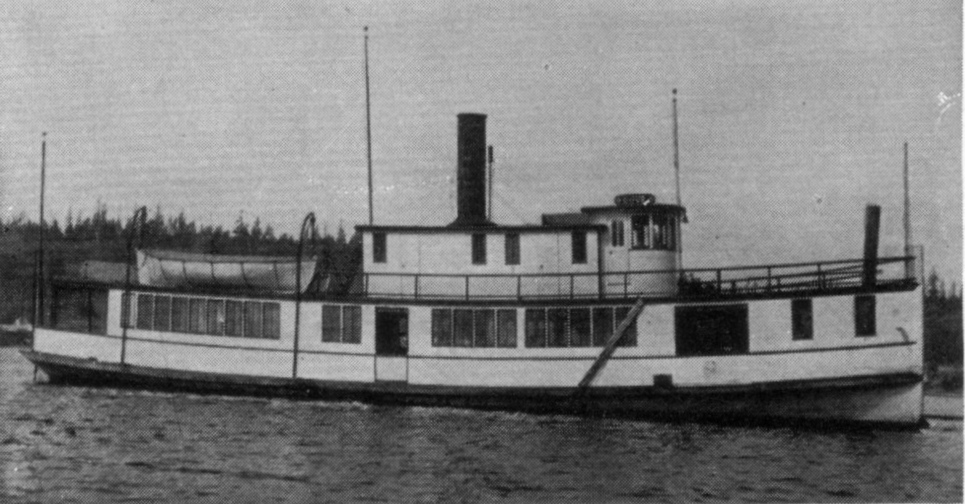
- Dove

History
- Name: Typhoon (1889–1903); Dove (1903–
- Owner: J. B. Montgomery (1889–1891); George Emerson; C. O. Lorenz; McDowell Trans. Co. (1903–1916)
- Route: Columbia River – Grays Harbor – Puget Sound
- Completed: 1889
- In service: 1889
- Fate: Uncertain

General characteristics
- Tonnage: 196 tons
- Length: 93.0 ft (28.3 m)
- Installed power: steam engine
- Propulsion: propeller-drive

Dove was a 196-ton propeller-driven steamboat built in Portland, Oregon in 1889. Launched as Typhoon, she operated in the late 1890s and early 1900s as part of the Puget Sound Mosquito Fleet and also for a time on Grays Harbor. She was later converted into a tug.

== Construction and career ==
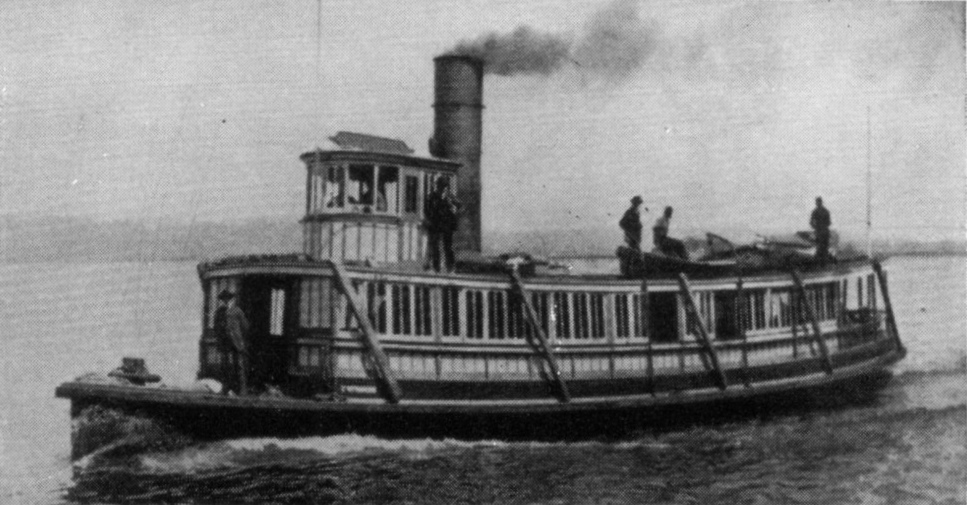
Typhoon, c. 1889

Dove was originally built in 1889 in Portland, Oregon for ferry service under J. B. Montgomery, and launched under the name Typhoon. In 1891, J. B. Montgomery sold Typhoon to George Emerson at Grays Harbor, who in turn sold the vessel a short time later to C. O. Lorenz, who brought her to Puget Sound and placed her on the Tacoma–Henderson Bay route. In 1903, she was acquired by Matthew McDowell, who rebuilt the vessel and placed her on the Seattle–Tacoma–East Pass route under the name Dove.

Around 1916, McDowell sold Dove to Washington Tug & Barge Co. of Seattle, and Dove thereafter served as a tug.
