= Sechelt (steamboat) =

1893 steamship built in Washington, United States

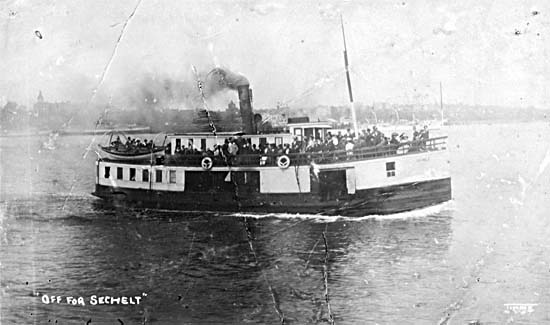
- Sechelt ex Hattie Hansen ca 1910

History
- Name: Sechelt (ex Hattie Hansen)
- Owner: Hansen and Sons (1894 to 1903); J.F. Curtis & Sons (1903 to circa 1909); Sechelt Towage Co. (circa 1909 to 1911); British Columbia Steamship Co. (1911)
- Route: Lake Washington, Seattle-Dogfish Bay, Hood Canal, Seattle-Poulsbo, Everett-Coupeville, Vancouver, BC-Sechelt, Victoria-Sooke
- Builder: Lee Shipyard, Sand Point, Lake Washington
- Launched: 1893, in Lake Washington
- In service: 1893
- Fate: Sank March 24, 1911

General characteristics
- Type: inland steamboat, passenger/freighter
- Length: 83 ft (25 m)
- Beam: 15 ft (5 m)
- Depth of hold: 6.5 ft (2 m)
- Installed power: steam engine
- Propulsion: propeller
- Notes: Insured for $9,000 on date of loss

Sechelt was an American steamship which operated from 1893 to 1911 on Lake Washington, Puget Sound and the Strait of Georgia, mostly as a passenger ferry with routes between Washington state and British Columbia. For most of her career, she was called Hattie Hansen. She became well known following her unexplained sinking with no survivors near Race Rocks Lighthouse in 1911.

== Construction ==
Hattie Hansen was built in 1893 on Lake Washington by the Edward F. Lee Shipyard at Sand Point. She was ordered by Capt. J.C. O'Connor for service on the lake. Before construction was complete, O'Connor sold her to Ole L. Hansen (1875–1940), one of the Hansen family which operated steamboats on Puget Sound.

== Operations ==
=== Puget Sound and Hood Canal service ===
Later in 1893 Hattie Hansen was brought out to the sound through the Duwamish River, which at that time connected to Lake Washington. Her new owners, the Hansen family, put her on the route from Seattle to Dogfish Bay (or Liberty Bay as local residents prefer). Captain J.J. Hansen served as her master. In 1898 she was switched over to the Hood Canal mail route for a time, later returning to the Seattle–Poulsbo route, where she stayed until 1902. Her last master on the Poulsbo run was Captain Alf Hostmark (1875–1953). J.F. Curtis and Sons bought Hattie Hansen in 1903 and put her on the Everett–Coupeville route, under Captain A.H. Curtis, where she ran until the ferry Whidby was placed on the route, and she was sold to a Canadian firm.

=== Strait of Georgia service ===
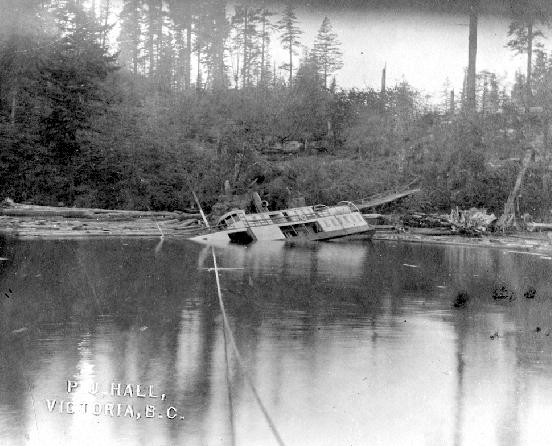
Sechelt sunk at Bowen Island, BC, November 1910

The new Canadian owners renamed the vessel Sechelt, after the town, peninsula and inlet in British Columbia, all ultimately named after the Shishalh people, one of the First Nations of British Columbia. Sechelt was first placed on the Vancouver–Sechelt route up the Strait of Georgia, under the command of Captain Robert Reginald Clarke. Captain Leopold Arther Bernays also commanded Sechelt from June to about the end of September or October. In 1910 Sechelt had some difficulties on this route, striking a reef at the Vancouver harbor entrance in August and going ashore at Bowen Island in November.

== Transfer to Strait of Juan de Fuca ==
=== Purchase by James and Jarvis ===
In January 1911, Captain H.B. James, of Victoria, together with his lifelong friend and former shipmate Harold Gray Jarvis, a marine surveyor, bought Sechelt at Vancouver, formed the Sechelt Towage Company, and then brought the vessel over to Vancouver Island. Although he had had experience as an officer on oceangoing vessels, Captain James had not long operated inland steamships, having arrived in British Columbia only in late 1909. James and Jarvis then set up business as the British Columbia Steamship Company. In 1910 or early 1911, they chartered the small steel-hulled twin-propeller steamer Tasmanian for a month to run on the route from Victoria to Sooke as a test to see if the business warranted the purchase of a larger vessel. Both James and Jarvis had licenses as master mariners. They then put Sechelt on the Victoria–Sooke route, and she made her first run on March 1, 1911, under Captain Caral Stromgren.

=== Sooke harbor route ===
Sooke was a town with a sheltered small harbor near the southern end of Vancouver Island, and the route there from Victoria required Sechelt to cross the eastern part of the Strait of Juan de Fuca, a notoriously dangerous body of water, which had in 1904 claimed the then-new steamboat Clallam, a much larger, newer, and stronger-built vessel than Sechelt. Clallam's sinking in nearly the same waters was well known in shipping circles and there was talk that Sechelt was not fit for the route. The vessel ran in the narrow passage between Race Rocks Lighthouse and the mainland, which was often hazardous in any conditions, but particularly on an ebb tide. As a condition of her insurance, just before James and Jarvis bought the vessel, her underwriters had required a thorough overhaul out of the water, which cost $6,000, the entire vessel having an insured value of $9,000.

=== First run to Sooke ===
On her first trip to Sooke, on March 1, 1911, Sechelt carried only four passengers and two tons of freight. The weather was good and all went well. On her return on March 2, she was laid up for some alteration work to her cabins. It also appears that she had lost a propeller blade on the trip to Sooke. Although in theory Captain Stromgren was the "regular master" of Sechelt, he in fact only made one trip in Sechelt–this first run–and, due in part to Stromgren's illness, James made 18 trips on the Sooke run in Sechelt.

== Loss of vessel ==
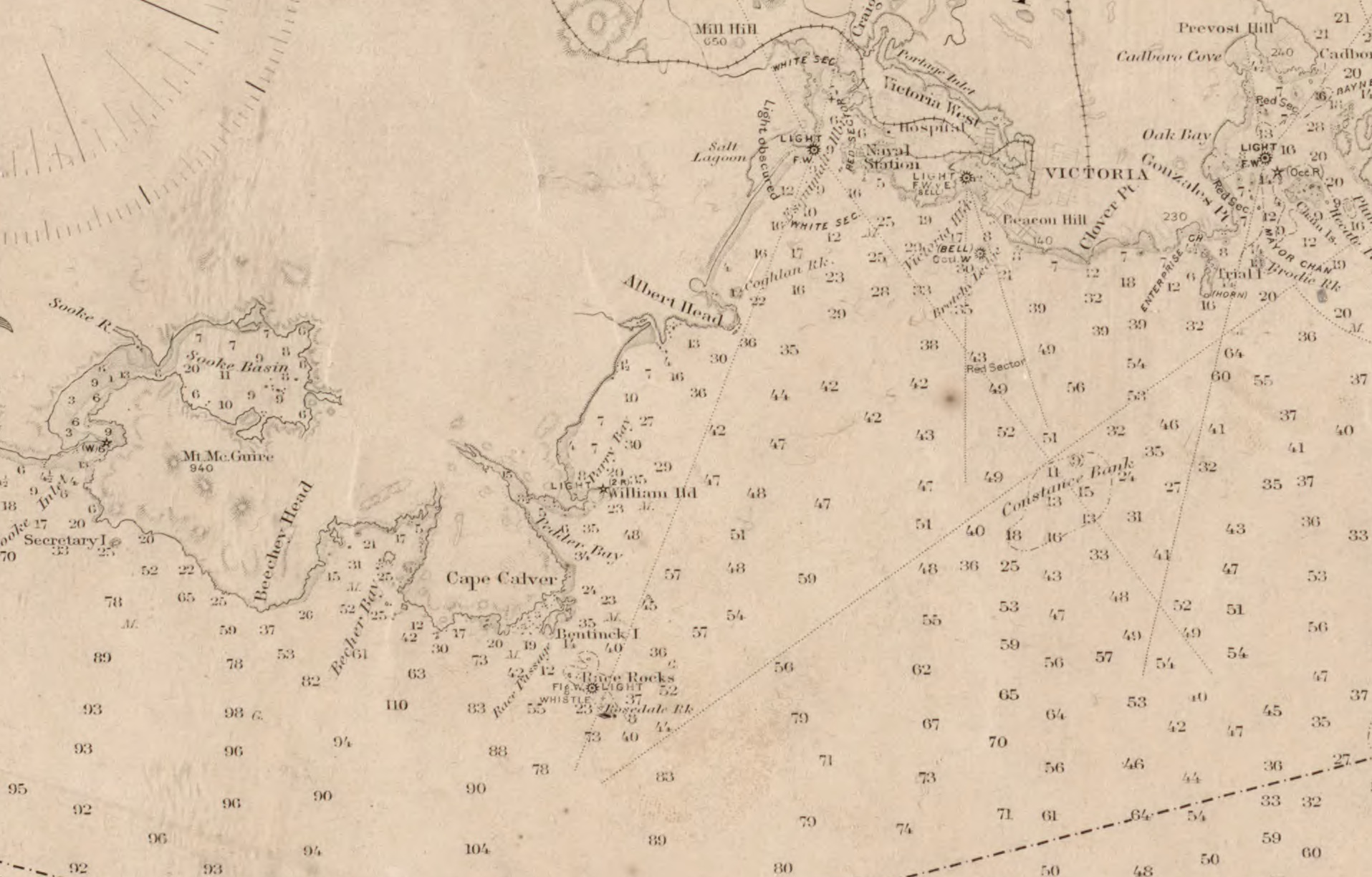
1906 nautical chart showing area of last run and sinking of Sechelt

=== Last run to Sooke ===
On Friday, March 24, 1911, with Captain H.B. James in command, Sechelt departed Victoria harbor at 2:30 PM. Aboard were her crew of four, an estimated 33 passengers, mostly workers on the Canadian Northern, and about 12,240 pounds of freight, including steel rails. She reached the government quarantine station dock at William Head, discharged about 13 passengers and freight, then left the quarantine dock at 3:58 PM.

=== Sinking ===
As she steamed around Beechy Head she was hit by high wind and seas in the Strait of Juan de Fuca. What happened next remains uncertain. Either her engine or steering gear failed, or Captain James decided to turn back.

The only witnesses to the sinking were Henry Charles and his wife Anna Charles, people of the First Nations living on Beacher Bay Reserve. Henry Charles had substantial sea experience working as a fisherman and on schooners. In later testimony, he described the sinking as follows:

A week before last Friday (March 24th) about 5 p.m. I was sitting in my house looking out of the window to seaward when I saw a small steamer coming around Church Point going west. It was blowing hard from the west and big sea on into which the steamer was bucking. There was a strong ebb tide and heavy tide rips. The steamer was about 500 yards (460 m) off the small island when she was going southwesterly (South Bedford Island). When she had passed about 100 yards (91 m) west of the island she changed her course towards the American side about south straight. She was rolling then the sea being on her side. She still kept on going off for about five minutes. Then the first big sea struck her on the side (the right side) and made her lie on her left side about that much (indicating about 45̊) She still kept going towards where the big seas were, big breakers, when the second sea struck her and laid her over more. Then a third sea struck her and laid her over on her side. About two minutes after she came back on an even keel. I could only see the house then, I could not see any of the black part of the steamer's hull. She was then heading to westward. About a minute after that she sank down and I did not see any more of her; she sank quick. ...I have been here all of my life and know the waters well in this vicinity. A strong gale and the rips are very dangerous. The last I saw of the steamer was her smoke stack as she went down. I ran 2 ½ miles to the post office and told of the disaster by telephone.

From this account, given by Henry Charles at his house, the examiner concluded that Sechelt had sunk about 1.5 miles (2.4 km) southeast of South Bedford Island (a bare rock) in 40 fathoms (240 ft) of water. All aboard were lost.

=== Rescue efforts fail ===
Having seen the disaster, Henry Charles ran to Rocky Point, where there was a telephone link to the quarantine station at William Head. The quarantine station received the call at 7:56 PM. They blew the emergency whistle, and five minutes later Captain Thomas Riley took out the government steamer Madge to go to the scene (Madge, a quarantine vessel, was chosen because she always had steam up, as a ship might arrive at any time.) When they got there, they cruised around in the dark for about two hours looking for bodies or wreckage, but found none.

The station also sent a launch to Victoria. The tug William Joliffe went out to the wreck scene, but could recover only one or two bodies. (This is according to McCurdy; Jarvis in testimony given shortly after the event stated that no bodies were ever recovered.) Wreckage washed up on nearby beaches, including both her two lifeboats still in their davits. All aboard were presumed drowned, an estimated 20 people.

== Inquiry into wreck ==
A thorough official inquiry was launched as to the causes of the wreck. The preliminary inquiry was conducted by Captain Charles Eddie, Examiner of Masters and Mates, of the Port of Vancouver.

=== Complaints about mechanical condition ===
On March 30, 1911, Augustus Charles Kick, an experienced man who had served as Sechelt's chief engineer from about March 4 to 17, 1911, testified that her bilge pumps were inadequate and she tended to ship a lot of water when the engine was working, apparently being the result of the loss of two of her propeller blades. The engineer considered Sechelt unstable unless she were well-ballasted, and if cargo were carried only on the main deck (instead of in the hold, which was entirely used for a coal bunker except for some ballast forward), in his opinion her instability would increase. The engineer testified that he had left Sechelt for this reason. Kick described the weather conditions on the day of the sinking but ascribed the accident entirely to the vessel's instability.

[A] heavy gale prevailed the whole of the day and would cause a heavy sea in the Straits, dangerous to most small craft even in thorough good working order and stability, which the Sechelt was not in my opinion.

=== Concern about weather conditions ===
Captain Caral Stromgren, Sechelt's "regular" captain, stated that he had been ill, so Captain James had relieved him. (Jarvis testified later that he and James had fired Stromgren, apparently related to his unawareness that he had lost a propeller blade and the possibility it posed for damage to the ship.) In any case, Stromgren had wanted to talk with Captain James on March 24, so he went down to the Grand Trunk Pacific dock, where he found that Sechelt had been shifted over to the Canadian Pacific Railway dock. It was blowing hard and raining, so he did not think Sechelt would go out and decided to speak with Captain James later. He did not learn until the next day that Sechelt had gone out and been lost. Had he been in command he would never had taken her out. With some exceptions, he considered Sechelt to have been in good condition.

=== Owners claim vessel in good condition ===
Harold Brown, who had been acting as booking agent for Sechelt, disagreed with Engineer Kick, testifying that he thought a vessel of Sechelt's type could have handled the sea conditions on the Strait and he had never at any time seen Sechelt out of trim.

=== Recent repair work and inspection ===
William Turpel, owner of a marine railway in Victoria, testified that his company had hauled Sechelt out of the water ten days before the sinking, on March 14, to repair her propeller, which, because one blade had been lost, required the removal of the opposite blade to keep the shaft in balance. In his opinion, without plenty of ballast, the boat was too tall and narrow to be a good sea boat. Harold G. Jarvis, her surviving owner, testified to the contrary, that he felt, as an experienced seaman, that Sechelt was perfectly suitable for the Victoria–Sooke run and that when he and Captain James had inspected her when she was hauled out at Turpel's yard, they both found her to be in "first-class" condition. He did not consider the vessel top-heavy, and stated she had made several trips just before her loss in worse weather conditions, which on the 24th he characterized as "fresh" but not a gale. He said that on March 24, 1911, he had been aboard the vessel before she sailed. All the cargo was stowed as low as possible on the main deck, and no cargo was carried on the upper deck, nor did they ever carry cargo on the upper deck. He could not give an opinion as to the cause of the loss of the vessel, but thought it must have been due to a sudden accident or mechanical problem which caused her to veer out of control broadside to the wind.

=== Conclusion ===
There is no record of the inquiry's decision readily to hand. One authority states no clear determination could be made as to the cause of sinking.

== Similar wrecks ==
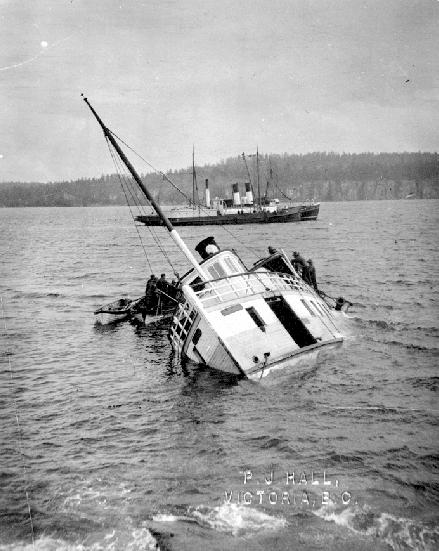
Wreck of Iroquois, a steamer similar to Sechelt which sank under similar circumstances, off Sidney, BC, April 1911

Less than three weeks later, on April 10, 1911, the steamer Iroquois sunk in similar circumstances in the Strait of Georgia. In that case, the ship's cargo, having been poorly stowed, shifted when the vessel encountered a squall. This time there were survivors, including the captain, who was convicted of manslaughter. The same tug, William Joliffe, that went out to Sechelt also went to the wreck of the Iroquois. The much larger steamer Clallam was lost in January 1904 in waters near the site of the sinking of Sechelt in somewhat similar weather conditions, and its loss was mentioned in the proceedings investigating the Sechelt disaster. In 1906, Dix, a similar vessel to Sechelt, capsized and sank quickly following a collision in Elliott Bay, and although there were survivors, like Sechelt, no lifeboats could be launched and many people were trapped inside and dragged down with the vessel.

== See also ==
- Clallam (steamboat)
- Dix (steamboat)
- SS Iroquois (1900)
