= Glen Acres, Washington =

Glen Acres
- Unincorporated community
- Steamer Daily at Glen Acres dock, 1916.

- Location within the state of Washington
- Coordinates: 47°28′58″N 122°27′36″W
- Country: United States
- State: Washington
- County: King
- Time zone: UTC-8 (Pacific (PST))
  - Summer (DST): UTC-7 (PDT)

Glen Acres is a community on Vashon Island located about two miles north of the town of Vashon.

== History ==
There was a post office at Glen Acres in 1917. The area was previously known as "Vermontville" and "Aquarium". The post office changed its name to "Glen Acres" in 1914. There was a dock at Glen Acres which was served in 1916 by the steamer Daily.
