= Crawford and Reid =

Ship building company

The firm of Crawford and Reid was a ship building company that had a shipyard at Tacoma, Washington in the first half of the 1900s. Vessels constructed by the yard included the passenger steamships Daring, Dix, Monticello , the sternwheeler S.G. Simpson, and the steam tugs Echo and USS Locust.

== See also ==
- Category:Ships built by Crawford and Reid
