= Moe Brothers =

American shipping firm

- Industry: shipping, logging
- Founded: Poulsbo, Washington, circa 1900
- Area served: Puget Sound, Kitsap County

Moe Brothers was a shipping firm that operated in Puget Sound and also a logging firm that operated in Kitsap County. The company was based in Poulsbo, Washington.

== Business ==
The two brothers, Albert Moe and Chris Moe (d. 1966), were the sons of Iver B. Moe (1840–1927), who came from Paulsbo, Norway. They were among the first settlers of the town of Poulsbo, Washington. The family was mainly in the logging business, but also branched out into steamboats when they purchased the Dauntless and later other steamboats. They were rivals of the Hansen steamboat family, who, like the Moes, had also come from Norway.

== Ships owned ==
The Moe brothers owned a number of vessels at various times, including Reliance, Athlon, Dauntless, the 1906 Monticello, and Advance.
