= Dix (steamboat) =

American steamboat built in 1904

Coordinates: 47°35′31.2″N 122°25′12″W

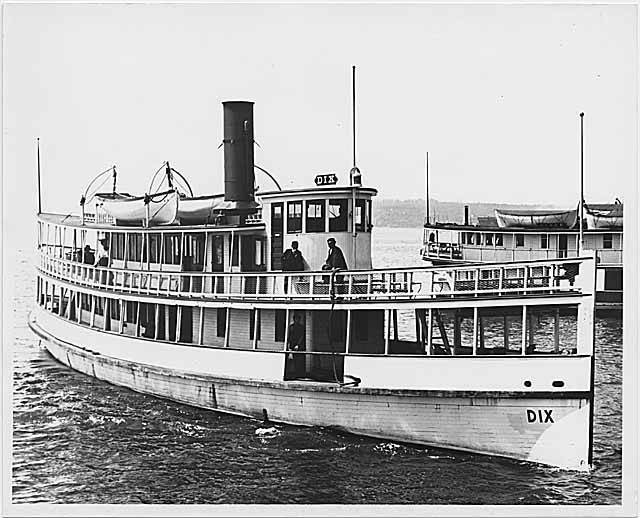
- Dix

History
- Name: Dix
- Owner: Seattle and Alki Point Transportation Company
- Route: Seattle - Alki Point, Seattle - Port Blakely
- Builder: shipyard of Crawford and Reid Tacoma
- Completed: 1904
- Fate: Sunk in collision, November 18, 1906

General characteristics
- Type: Inland passenger dayboat
- Tonnage: 130 tons
- Length: 102.5 ft (31.2 m)
- Beam: 20.5 ft (6.2 m)
- Depth of hold: 7.5 ft (2.3 m)
- Installed power: steam engine
- Propulsion: propeller-drive

The steamboat Dix operated from 1904 to 1906 as part of the Puget Sound Mosquito Fleet in the U.S. state of Washington. She was sunk in a collision which remains one of the most serious transportation accidents in the state of Washington to this day.

In May 2011, it was erroneously reported that wreckage likely to be that of the Dix had been confirmed off Seattle's Alki Point. What they believed to be the wreckage was soon acknowledged to not be the Dix.

The true discovery of the Dix was announced on November 17, 2023 by the Northwest Shipwreck Alliance. Working with Rockfish Inc., the Alliance revealed to reporters that they had been studying the wreck site for years and testing their equipment on it. Their hope is to bring legal protection to the site to prevent disturbance of the gravesite.

== Construction ==
Dix was built in 1904 at the Tacoma yard of Crawford and Reid. Dix was 102.5 ft (31.2 m) long, 20.5 ft (6.2 m) on the beam, 7.5 ft (2.3 m) depth of hold, and rated at 130 tons. Later, given her tragic end, it was recalled, perhaps superstitiously, that the launching of Dix was a failure. The vessel had simply refused to move down the ways at Crawford and Reid, and had to be hauled into the water the next day by Captain Sutter in command of Tacoma Tug and Barge's Fairfield.

Dix was purpose-built for one route only, the run across Elliott Bay from Seattle to Alki Point, then the main recreation area for Seattle. Her owners were A.B.C. Dennison and W.L. Dudley, doing business as the Seattle and Alki Point Transportation Company. She was lightly built and apparently top-heavy, as the steamboat inspectors twice refused to issue her a seaworthiness certificate. They relented only when her builders installed 7 tons of gravel ballast in her hull and bolted 5 tons of iron weights to her keel. Even so, she was said to be difficult to handle.

== Operations ==
Dennison and Dudley put Dix on the intended Seattle-Alki route. In summer service with their other steamer Manette, the two boats made nineteen trips daily. During the legislative session in early 1905, Dix was placed on the Olympia-Tacoma route. The fast sternwheeler Greyhound was already on that run and there wasn't much business left over, so in January 1905 Dix was returned to the Alki run.

== Sinking ==
On November 18, 1906, Dix was acting as a relief boat for Monticello on the Seattle-Port Blakely run. She left Seattle with about 77 passengers. Her captain, Percy Lermond, tasked with collecting fares, was absent from the pilot house, leaving the mate Charles Dennison in charge. Theoretically fare collection was a job for the purser, but on the smaller vessels, it was customary for the master to perform this function.

The evening was calm and somewhat clear, and as the vessel steamed west past Alki Point into the open Sound, Captain Lermond went to his quarters behind the pilot house to tally the fares. Off Duwamish Head, Dix approached near the Alaska Coast Company steamer Jeanie and then mate Dennison (who it turns out was unlicensed) inexplicably turned the vessel directly into Jeanie's path. Jeanie was ten times the size of Dix and loaded with iron ore. Even though Jeanie had already reversed her engines, and was barely under steerage way, the impact was sufficient, given the much greater weight of Jeanie, to cause Dix to heel sharply over on her port side. She quickly filled with water, rolled over, and sank in 103 fathoms (188 m). Captain Lermond described the terrifying scene:

The sight fascinated me by its horror. Lights were still burning and I could see people inside of the cabin. The expressions on the faces were of indescribable despair. ... There were cries, prayers, and groans from men and women, and the wail of a child and the shouts of those who were fighting desperately to gain the deck.

== Impact of sinking ==
The first vessel on the scene was Florence K, whose master, Capt. Cyprian T. Wyatt (1877-1952) and chief engineer, E.L. Franks, picked up the first survivors and took them to Port Blakely. The shock of the survivors was great, as a newspaper account of the time showed:

"Tottering and shaking with tearless sobs ... (Adeline) Byler was led from the steamboat unable to walk unassisted," the Daily Times reported. " 'Have you seen my boys? Oh, my boys!' was the consoless question that Mrs. Byler put to every man. As nothing definite was heard, nor either of them put in an appearance, Mrs. Byler collapsed."

Reports of the number of passengers lost vary; The New York Times, having received a dispatch from Portland, Oregon about the sinking, reported the number lost as 40. Years later, in a 1913 story about Jeanie's loss off Calvert Island, the Times reported the number of passengers lost by the sinking of Dix as 54. A 2011 Seattle Times article said the number was "as many as 45", when another source has it as over 45 people, including Charles Dennison. Mrs. Byler's sons, Charles and Christian, and their sister, Lillian, were all trapped below deck and taken down when the ship sank.

The chief engineer, George F. Parks, also drowned. The wreck was sunk so deep that salvage operations were impossible. No bodies were ever recovered; the people were trapped inside and went down with her. Most of the Dix victims were from Port Blakely, and the place was hit hard, that night in the little town being described as "running of a gauntlet of shrieks and moans of grief-stricken wives and mothers ..." Work stopped briefly at the huge Port Blakely Lumber Mill for the first time in the mill's history.

Captain Lermond was one of the survivors, indeed he died only in 1959, at the age of 90 years. Following the Dix sinking, his master's and pilot licenses were revoked. The Steamboat Inspection Service found Dix totally at fault for failure to keep an efficient lookout; the captain, who had been acting as both master and fare collector at the time of the accident, was found to have negligently relinquished his control of the steamer to an unqualified person. Captain Lermond had apparently failed to protest the requirement he collect fares for fear of his job.

Although his license was reinstated a year later, Captain Lermond served exclusively in command of tugs for the rest of his career until 1933, never again commanding a passenger vessel.

Though the fault was placed with Dix and captain Lermond it was found during the investigation that Jeanie was navigating in violation of law with only one engineer, the first assistant, on the engine; without the knowledge of the ship's master. Up until then, with the significant exception of Clallam, the steamboats had enjoyed a good reputation for safety, at least by the standards of the time. The circumstances of the loss of Dix were all the more shocking to the people on the Sound, who depended on the steamboats for their basic transportation.

In 1973, a memorial to Dix was dedicated in a small park at Duwamish Head.
