= SS Ixion =

History

United Kingdom
- Name: Ixion
- Namesake: Ixion
- Owner: Alfred Holt & Co
- Operator: Blue Funnel Line (1892–1902)
- Port of registry: (United Kingdom) Liverpool (1892–1902)
- Ordered: September 1891
- Builder: Scott & Company
- Cost: £51,690
- Yard number: 304
- Launched: 23 November 1892
- Completed: 29 December 1892
- Acquired: 29 December 1892
- Out of service: September 1902
- Identification: UK official number 102068
- Fate: Transferred to Netherlands 1902

Netherlands
- Name: Ixion
- Namesake: Ixion
- Operator: Nederlandsche Stoomvaart Maatschappij Oceaan (1902–1911)
- Port of registry: (Netherlands) Amsterdam (1902–1911)
- Acquired: September 1902
- Out of service: 1 October 1911
- Fate: Burned and sank 1 October 1911

General characteristics
- Type: Cargo ship
- Tonnage: 3,489 GRT
- Length: 108.1 metres (354 ft 8 in)
- Beam: 13 metres (42 ft 8 in)
- Depth: 8.1 metres (26 ft 7 in)
- Installed power: Triple expansion steam engine
- Propulsion: Screw propeller
- Speed: 11 knots
- Crew: 47

SS Ixion was a Dutch cargo ship that caught fire and sank near the coast of the Netherlands East Indies in 1911. Built in 1892 and originally operated by the Blue Funnel Line, she was transferred to the company's Dutch subsidiary, Nederlandsche Stoomvaart Maatschappij Oceaan, in September 1902.

== Construction ==
Ixion was launched on 23 November 1892 and completed the following month at the Scotts & Company shipyard in Greenock, United Kingdom.

The ship was 108.1 metres (354 ft 8 in) long, with a beam of 13 metres (42 ft 8 in) and a depth of 8.1 metres (26 ft 7 in). The ship was assessed at 3,489 GRT. She had a triple expansion steam engine driving a single screw propeller. The engine was rated at 2285 indicated horsepower.

== Sinking ==
On 1 October 1911, one of Ixion's coal bunkers caught fire off the coast of the Netherlands East Indies, causing her to sink with the loss of 24 of her 47 crew members. Her 23 survivors were rescued by the British steamer Good Hope. At the time, she was carrying a cargo that included copra and tobacco from Tanjung Priok to Amsterdam. The ship's name was revived when another vessel of the same name was launched only 14 months after her loss.
