= SS Island Princess =

1900 cruise ship of all time

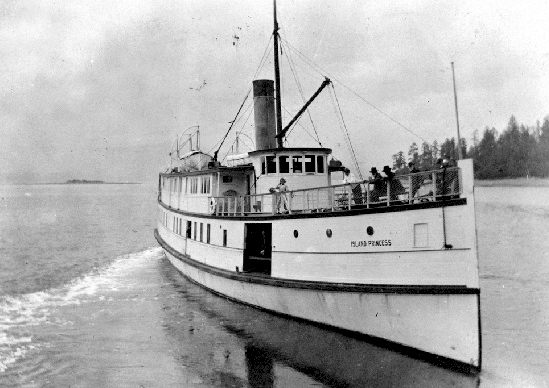
- Island Princess

History
- Name: Island Princess (originally Daily and later Cy Peck)
- Owner: Matthew McDowell, Canadian Pacific Railway Coast Service, Gulf Islands Ferry Company
- Route: Puget Sound (Vashon and Maury Islands); Gulf Islands
- Builder: Matthew McDowell, at shipyard in Tacoma
- Completed: 1913
- In service: 1913
- Out of service: c. 1980
- Identification: IMO number: 5083241
- Fate: Sunk as reef near Saltspring Island
- Notes: Built as Daily, ran on Puget Sound 1913-1918, then sold to CPR

General characteristics
- Tonnage: 254-tons
- Length: 168 ft (51 m)
- Beam: 35 ft (11 m)
- Draft: 8.0 ft (2 m)
- Installed power: steam engine
- Propulsion: propeller-drive
- Notes: Converted to auto ferry 1930, still afloat in 1970s as fishing dock

The steamboat Daily operated in the early 1900s as part of the Puget Sound Mosquito Fleet. In later years, Daily was renamed Island Princess and later Cy Peck.

== Construction ==
Daily was built in 1913 by Matthew McDowell at his yard at Caledonia, near Tacoma. Daily was one of the larger vessels built by Captain McDowell, 116' long, 25' on the beam, 8' depth of hold and rated at 254 tons. Daily was the seventh Puget Sound passenger and freight vessel built by Captain McDowell. Daily was a classic example of a mixed-used Puget Sound mosquito fleet vessel, as shown by photos published and drawings prepared by Professor Turner.

== Operations ==
Daily was placed on the Seattle-Tacoma route, running via points on Vashon and Maury islands.

== Sale to Canadian Pacific Railway ==
In 1918, Daily was sold to the coastal service of the Canadian Pacific Railway, who renamed her Island Princess. CPR put her in the Gulf Islands service, where she made a significant improvement. She was the smallest vessel in the CPR Fleet. Island Princess (ex Daily) ran for CPR from 1918 to 1930. She served points on North Pender, South Pender, Mayne, Galiano, and Saltspring Islands.

== Sale to Gulf Islands Ferry Co. ==
CPR's Gulf Island service was proving successful, so Captain Troup, the head of CPR's steamship division, decided to replace Island Princess with the old CPR steamer Charmer in 1927. Unlike Island Princess, Charmer had been rebuilt to carry automobiles. In 1930, CPR sold Island Princess to the Gulf Islands Ferry Company which renamed her Cy Peck after British Columbia war hero and politician Cyrus Wesley Peck. The new owners rebuilt her to carry automobiles.

== Later career ==
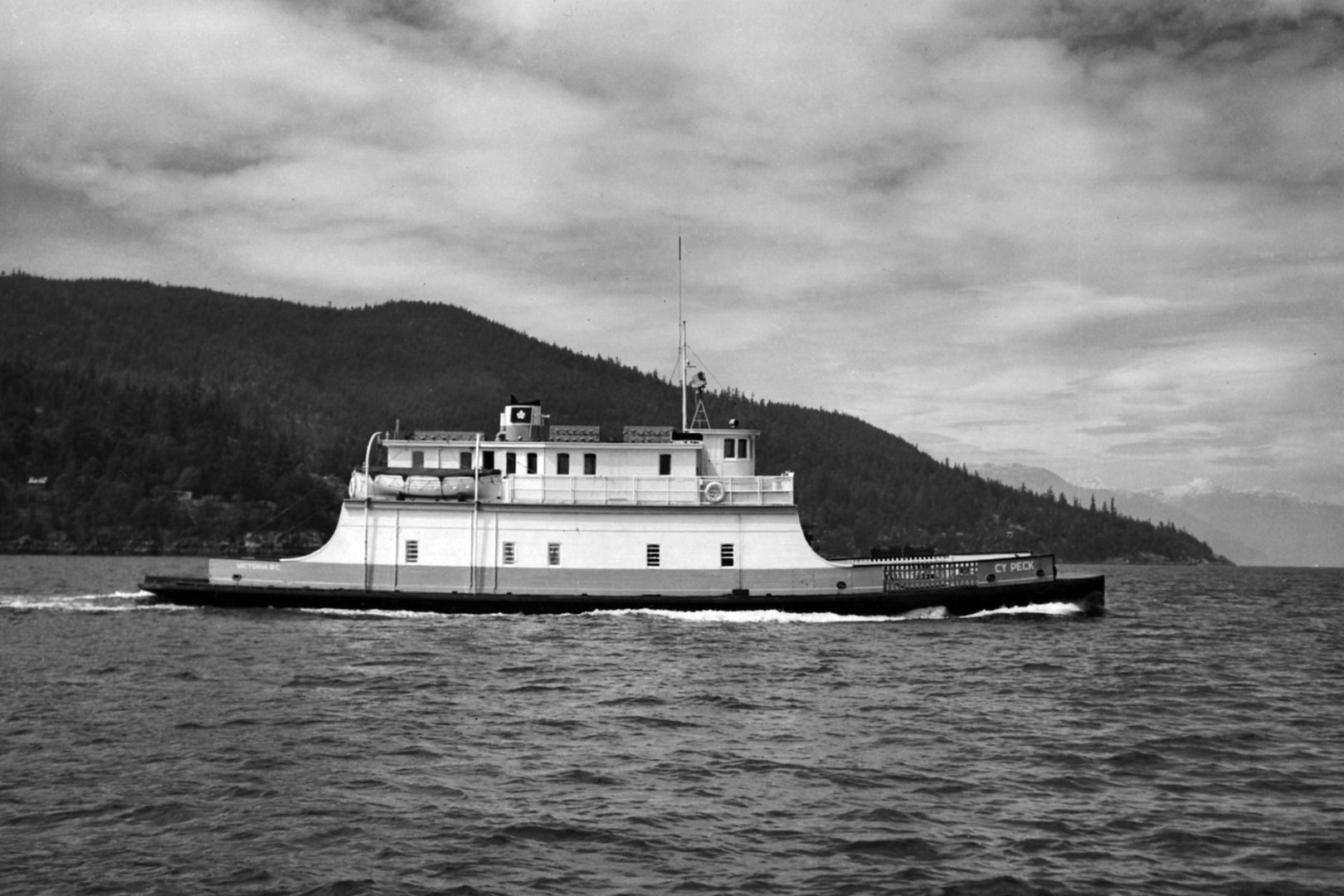
Cy Peck in BC Ferries livery (1962)

Cy Peck (ex Island Princess ex Daily) was still in regular operation in British Columbia waters (on the Fulford Harbour-Swartz Bay crossing) as late as 1956. In 1961, BC Ferries purchased the Cy Peck along with other Gulf Island ferries, keeping her as a relief vessel at Fulford Harbour. In 1966, she was sold to J.H. Todd & Sons for use as a floating fishing camp. In 1975, she was reported still extant in private use on Saltspring Island at the town of Ganges. A replica of the ship's wheelhouse can be found on the Ganges waterfront.

== See also ==
Matthew McDowell
