= SS Iroquois (1900) =

Coordinates: 48.641°N 123.392°W

History
- Owner: T.W. Paterson
- Launched: 19 February 1900
- Fate: Sank 10 April 1911

General characteristics
- Type: Steamboat ferry
- Length: 82 ft (25 m)
- Speed: 12 knots (22 km/h; 14 mph)
- Capacity: 100 tons

SS Iroquois was a Canadian steamboat ferry active in British Columbia, Canada. She was launched on 19 February 1900 at Port Moody. She ran from Sidney to Nanaimo, making stops at the southern Gulf Islands. In 1902, she was taken out of service, replaced by Strathcona. Three months later, Strathcona broke down, and Iroquois was returned to service.

On 10 April 1911, Iroquois was overloaded with poorly secured cargo and sank in a heavy storm when the cargo shifted as she left Sidney. At least 21 people were killed and Iroquois′ captain was charged with, but acquitted of, manslaughter.

In 1980, Iroquois′ propeller was salvaged. It is part of a memorial in Iroquois Park, a municipal park in Sidney.
