= Rosalie (steamship) =

Puget Sound steamboat from 1893 to 1918

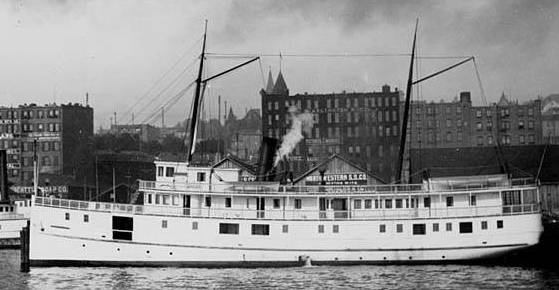
- Rosalie in Seattle, 1894

History
- Name: Rosalie
- Owner: Northwestern Steamship Co.; Puget Sound Navig. Co.
- Route: Puget Sound, Strait of Georgia, Admiralty Inlet, Strait of Juan de Fuca, Alaska
- In service: 1893
- Out of service: 1918
- Fate: Burned

General characteristics
- Type: inland steamship
- Tonnage: 473
- Length: 136 ft (41 m)
- Beam: 27 ft (8 m)
- Depth: 9 ft (3 m) depth of hold
- Decks: three (freight, passenger, boat)
- Installed power: steam engine
- Propulsion: propeller

The steamboat Rosalie operated from 1893 to 1918 as part of the Puget Sound Mosquito Fleet, also operating out of Victoria, B.C. In 1898, Rosalie went north with many other Puget Sound steamboats to join the Klondike Gold Rush.

== Construction ==
Rosalie was built at Alameda, California in 1893 originally for the Alameda ferry service. She was 136 ft (41 m) long, 27 ft (8 m) on the beam, with 9 ft (3 m) depth of hold. The vessel was powered by a compound steam engine.

== Opposing the Southern Pacific Railroad ==
Oakland merchant John L. Davie utilized the Rosalie in 1894 to demonstrate that monopolistic and corrupt practices by the Southern Pacific Railroad's Big Four could be resisted. He employed the vessel as a ferryboat competing against the established monopoly service across San Francisco Bay, but at first was blockaded by Southern Pacific ships. In one incident, as the Southern Pacific's Alameda entered its namesake estuary and ignored her whistle, the Rosalie crashed into the rear end of the Alameda. The railroad relented and the Rosalie continued freely competing with the Southern Pacific ferries.

== Puget Sound service ==
Rosalie was brought north from California to run from Puget Sound to Alaska. After two Alaska voyages, Rosalie was purchased by Capt. D.B Jackson, then doing business as the Northwestern Steamship Company, to serve on Puget Sound with the older sidewheelers George E. Starr and Idaho. Rosalie was then placed on the Tacoma-Seattle-Victoria route, under Capt. Charles W. "Big" Ames as master and Capt. William Williamson as pilot. When news of the Klondike gold strike hit Seattle, Rosalie was pulled from service (this on July 25, 1897) for some reconstruction to prepare to go north again with the gold seekers. Capt, George T. Roberts (b. 1849) replaced Captain Ames, and George Lent, a partner in the Alaska Steamship Company, took over as engineer. Charles E. Peabody (1857–1926) assumed the all-important financial position of purser.

== Return to Alaska ==
By 1898, Rosalie was controlled by the Washington & Alaska Steamship Company in which among others, Peabody, then acting as Rosalie's purser, was interested,. The company ran six sailings a month from Seattle, to Mary Island, Metlakatla, Ketchikan, Wrangell, Juneau, Dyea, Haines Mission and Skagway with the Rosalie among other vessels.

== Return to Puget Sound as boom fades ==
Rosalie ran in on the Alaska route from 1897 to 1900. By 1900, the extreme boom for transport to the Klondike golf fields had faded, and Rosalie was returned to Puget Sound, this time as the first vessel in the ownership of Joshua Green. Green had secured six mail route contracts on Puget Sound and was looking to buy other vessels in addition to Rosalie to serve the contracts. Green set Rosalie running between Puget Sound and British Columbia points. In 1903, Captain Roberts was appointed master of the new inland steamship Clallam which soon thereafter sank in the Strait of Juan de Fuca with the loss of 54 lives, including all the women and children on board.

On January 11, 1907, Rosalie assisted at the wreck of the Alice Gertrude which in a fog had run around on Clallam Reef. In 1908, Rosalie managed to ram the then new steam ferry West Seattle. Also in 1908, the Puget Sound Navigation company, which had purchased the steel steamer Chippewa found the newly acquired ship expensive to operate, and so Rosalie replaced Chippewa on the Victoria run in the off-season. Rosalie was standing by at Colman Dock on May 19, 1912, when Flyer had extended her gangplank improperly, causing it to collapse and throw people that had been on it into the water. The crew of Rosalie lowered a boat to assist the fireboat Snoqualmie and the launch Skeeter in rescuing the people. Despite these efforts, two passengers drowned.

== Out of service and destruction by fire ==
By 1918, Rosalie had been taken out of service and laid up in the West Waterway in Seattle. On June 22, 1918 the vessel was destroyed by fire. No one was injured.
