= T. W. Lake =

- T.W. Lake at Pier 3, Seattle, 1915 or earlier.

History
- Name: T.W. Lake
- Owner: La Conner Trading & Trans. Co., others later
- Builder: T.W. Lake
- Completed: 1896
- Out of service: 1923
- Identification: US registry #145700
- Fate: Lost with all hands in Rosario Strait.

General characteristics
- Type: Inland steamboat
- Tonnage: 191 gross tons
- Length: 96.5 ft (29.41 m)
- Beam: 24.9 ft (7.59 m)
- Depth of hold: 6.8 ft (2.07 m)
- Installed power: Twin compound steam engines, developing about 100 hp (75 kW); later 45 hp (34 kW) twin diesel engines.
- Propulsion: Twin propellers
- Notes: Reconstructed from hulk of steamer Annie M. Pence

T.W. Lake was a steamboat that ran on Puget Sound in the early 1900s. This vessel was lost with all hands on December 5, 1923 in one of the worst disasters of the Puget Sound Mosquito Fleet.

== Career ==
T.W. Lake was built in 1896 by the T.W Lake shipyard for the firm of Joshua Green and associates, who had incorporated as the La Conner Trading and Transportation Company (LCT&T). The vessel had a wooden hull and works, and was intended to operate as a freighter. The hull was salvaged from the sternwheeler Annie M. Pence, which had burned in 1895. In 1903, the vessel passed into the control of the Puget Sound Navigation Co. ("PSN") after that company purchased LCT&T. In 1905 PSN sold the freighter to the Merchants Transportation Company. In 1916 T.W. Lake was fitted with Barlow freight elevator. In 1918 the vessel was completely reconstructed from the boiler room forward. The steam engines were removed and were replaced by two Fairbanks-Morse 45 horsepower (34 kW) diesel engines.

== Lost with all hands ==
On December 5, 1923, operating in the San Juan Islands, T.W. Lake was en route from Roche Harbor to Anacortes, Washington with a cargo of 700 barrels of lime, under Capt. Elmore Ellsworth Mason and chief engineer Joseph Larsen. Crossing Rosario Strait, at 7:15 p.m., the freighter encountered wind speeds of 72 miles per hour, and foundered off Lopez Island. All fourteen (14) men aboard were lost. News clippings state 15 Men, after some research one crew member did not board the vessel.(T.Hughes)
