= Pier 2, Seattle =

Former shipping terminal in Washington State, US

Coordinates: 47°36′06″N 122°20′12″W

- A crowd at Pier 2.
- Type: Shipping pier and warehouse
- Location: Seattle, Washington
- Owner: Northern Pacific Railway

Characteristics
- Total length: 770 ft (234.7 m)
- Width: 120 ft (36.6 m)

Pier 2 in Seattle, Washington (after May 1, 1944, Pier 51) was an important shipping terminal.

== Location ==
Pier 2 was located at the foot of Yesler Way. Pier 2 was immediately to the north of Pier 1 and immediately to the south of Colman Dock.

== History ==
Pier 2 and Pier 1 to its south were built between 1901 and 1904, replacing Yesler's Wharf. In 1904, Joshua Green's La Conner Trading, by then a subsidiary of the Puget Sound Navigation Company, was operating jointly with businessman H.B. Kennedy as the Navy Yard Route on the Seattle – Bremerton run. Disposing of three vessels, including the Inland Flyer, Athlon, and the sternwheeler Port Orchard, the Navy Yard route ran six sailings a day from Pier 2 to and from Bremerton, Washington.

In 1917, like Pier 1, Pier 2 was owned by the Northern Pacific Railway, although in the case of Pier 2 it was operated by the Alaska Steamship Company. Pier 2 measured 770 by 120 feet (235 by 37 m), with 1,400 feet (430 m) of berthing space. Pier 2 had a warehouse measuring 750 by 100 feet (229 by 30 m), with a cargo capacity of 17,000 tons. Track capacity at Pier 2 was 18 rail cars. Like Pier 1, Pier 2 had adjustable slips. In 1917 Pier 2 had an electric crane, with a capacity 25 tons.

As with Pier 1/50, Alaska Steamship Company left in the late 1940s. The pier had various uses over the next three decades. Washington State Ferries moored ships there; eventually the pier lost its shed and became mainly a parking lot. In the early 1960s, the restaurant Polynesia was built there. The pier was also home to Ye Olde Curiosity Shop., In 1971, it was owned and/or operated by Seattle Piers, Inc. and, along with Pier 1/50, was the proposed site for a World Trade Center, which was ultimately built elsewhere. The pier was torn down early 1980s to expand the Washington State Ferries terminal at Pier 52 (Colman Dock).
