= Pier 54, Seattle =

Pier in Seattle, Washington, US

Pier 54
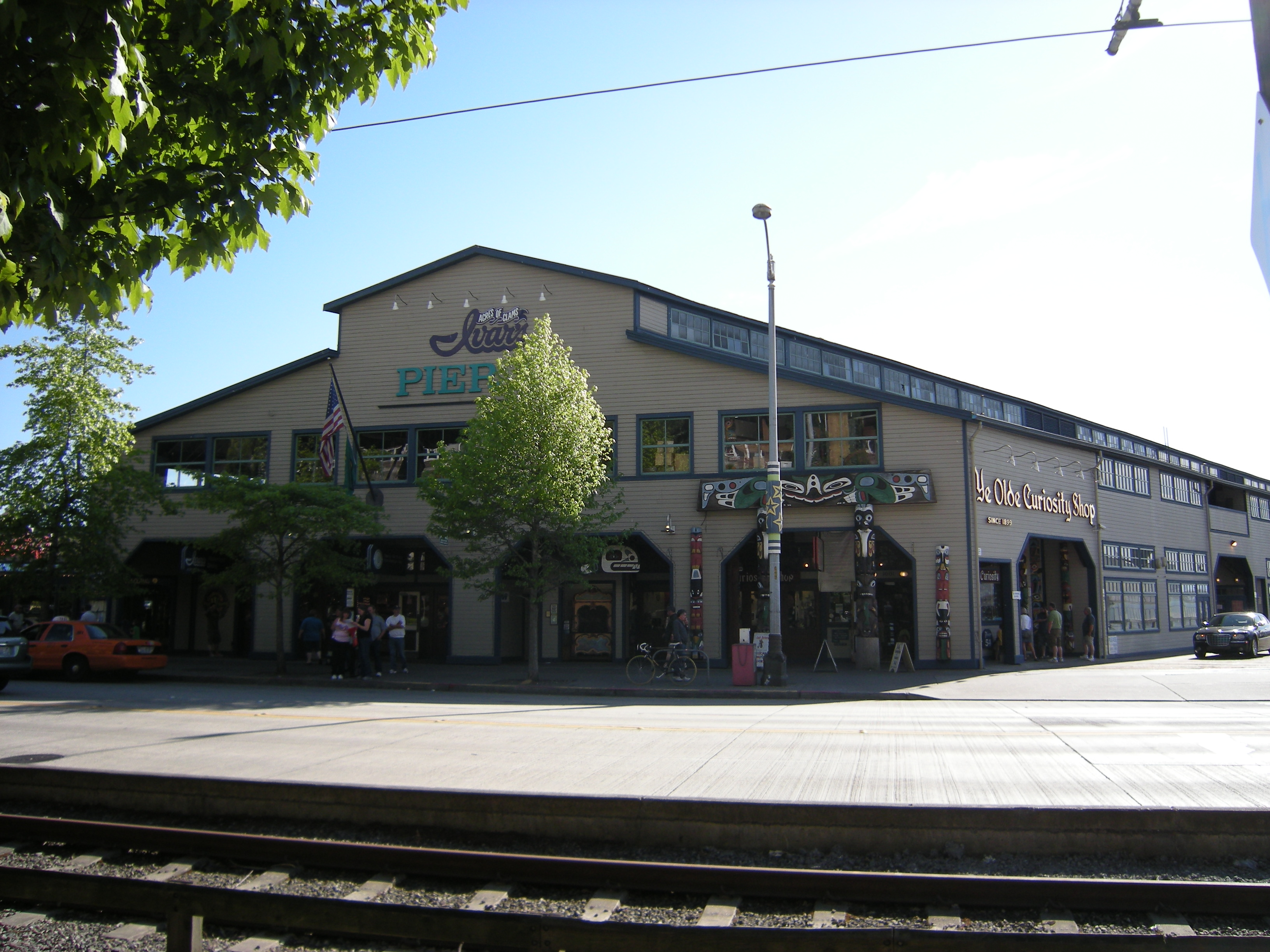
- Pier 54 from Alaskan Way, 2009
- Type: tourist pier; former shipping pier and warehouse
- Location: Seattle, Washington
- Coordinates: 47°36′15″N 122°20′22″W
- Owner: 1900–1944: Northern Pacific Rwy., others later.

Characteristics
- Total length: 300 ft (91.4 m)
- Width: 150 ft (45.7 m)

History
- Opening date: 1900

Pier 54 is a tourist pier in Seattle, Washington. Previously an active shipping pier and warehouse, Pier 54 was originally known as Pier 3 until it was renumbered during World War II. This pier was also known as Galbraith dock and the Galbraith Bacon dock. Because of the large number of smaller local steamships, generally built of wood, that used the pier up until the 1930s, the pier was also known as the “Mosquito Fleet dock”.

== Location ==
Pier 54 is located at the foot of Spring Street. The current dock for the fireboats of the Seattle Fire Department is located immediately to the south of Pier 54. Pier 55 is the next pier to the north.

== Construction ==
Pier 3 measured 300 by 150 feet (91 by 46 m), and had a cargo warehouse measuring 284 by 130 feet (87 by 40 m) with a storage capacity of 10,000 tons. There were two spur railway tracks on the pier. Depth of water at the pier was 25 to 40 feet (7.6 to 12.2 m).

== History ==
Pier 54 (then Pier 3) circa 1901, with steamer T.W. Lake alongside.

Starting in 1900, Pier 3 was leased by Galbraith, Bacon & Co. The principals of this firm were James Galbraith and Cecil Bacon. They were wholesale dealers in grain, hay, plaster, concrete, and building materials. In 1910, the pier narrowly escaped destruction in the Belltown fire, although the nearby Galbraith, Bacon warehouse was destroyed. 36 of their horses burned to death. Two horses, named Don and Frank, were rescued by workers who had been sleeping in the building at the time.

In 1917, like Pier 1 and Pier 2, Seattle, Pier 3 was owned by the Northern Pacific Railway.

Pier 3 was the terminal for Island Transportation Co., Merchants Transportation Co., Puget Sound Naval Station Route, Kitsap County Transportation Company, Pollard Steamship. Co., and other Puget Sound local shipping lines. The Kitsap County Transportation Company, run by James Galbraith's son Walter Galbraith, competed against the Puget Sound Navigation Company running from the Colman Dock. As such it was home pier for wooden steamships such as the Kitsap, the Utopia, the Reliance and the Hyak. Other Puget Sound steamers known to have called at Pier 3 included Magnolia, Mohawk, Florence K, Dode, and Monticello 2. Pier 3 was within walking distance of Pike Place Market where much of the local groceries brought in by the steamers were sold. Typically this would have been done by the farmers themselves or their wives, who would ride the steamers into Pier 3 in the morning and depart in the evening. Live hens, slaughtered poultry, eggs, milk in galvanized cans, sacks of potatoes, rhubarb in bundles and fruit in crates. Dockside travel facilities offered few comforts then, but Pier 3 was one of the first to offer a small waiting room.

From 1929 to the mid-1930s Pier 3 was general headquarters for Gorst Air Transport, who operated a seaplane service from there, using Keystone-Loening planes. They also operated out of Bremerton across the Sound. Through this period, the Northern Pacific still owned the pier, but by 1944 the Washington Fish and Oyster Company (now Ocean Beauty Seafoods) had purchased the pier and was its main tenant. Engineering firm Reese and Callender Associates helped them reinforce the pier and to adapt it to its new use.

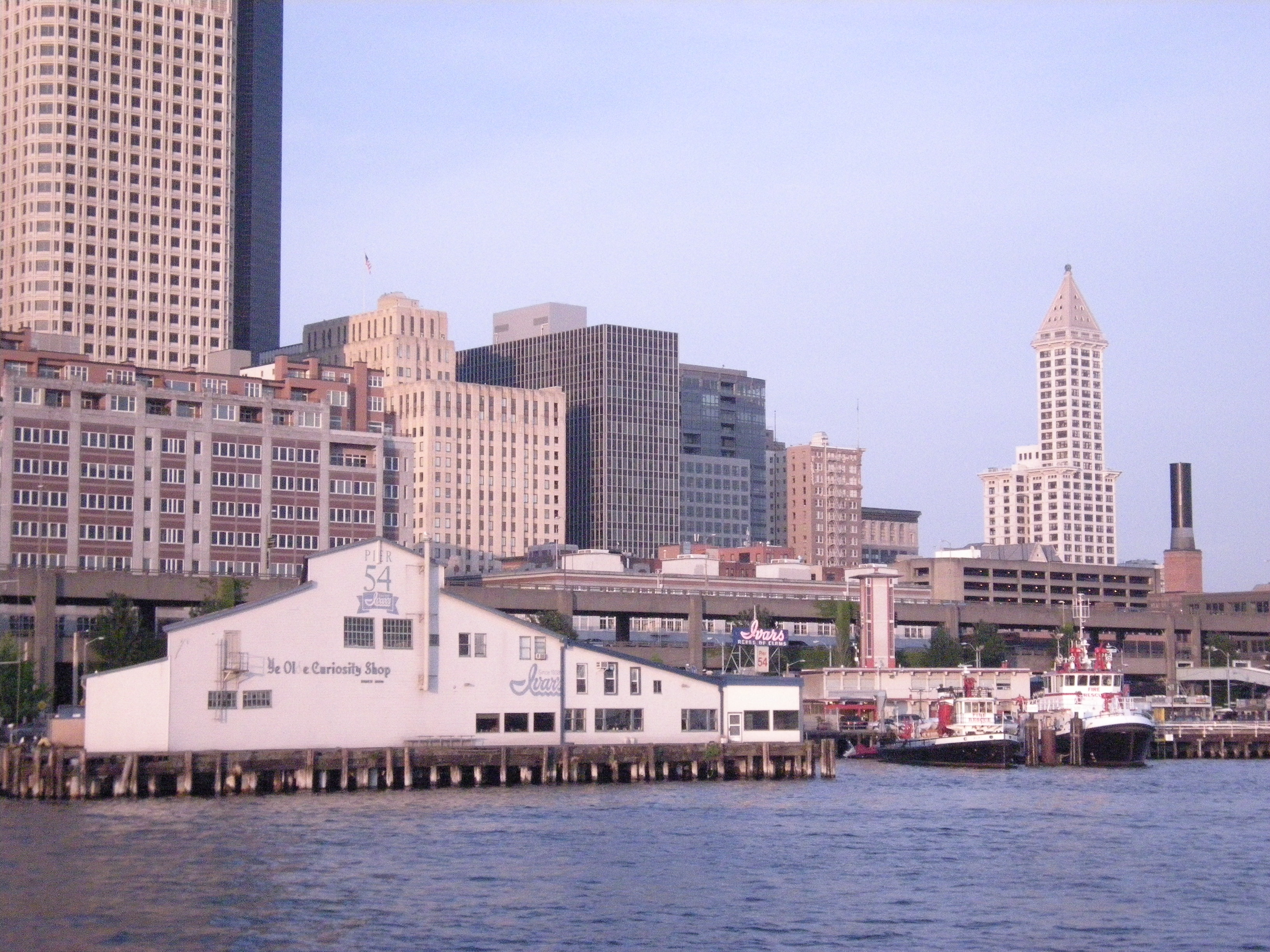
Pier 54 from water, 2009

In 1938 Ivar Haglund rented the northeast corner of the pier shed for a one-room aquarium, which included a small fish and chips stand, later known as Ivar's Acres of Clams. The aquarium closed around 1945, at which time the restaurant moved to the southeastern corner and was redesigned in Streamline Moderne style.

During World War Two, Pier 3 was renumbered as Pier 54. In June 1966 Haglund bought Pier 54 for $500,000. Washington Fish and Oyster Company then became Haglund's tenant. The restaurant was repeatedly redesigned and expanded over the years, achieving more or less its present configuration before Haglund's death in 1985.

== Current status ==
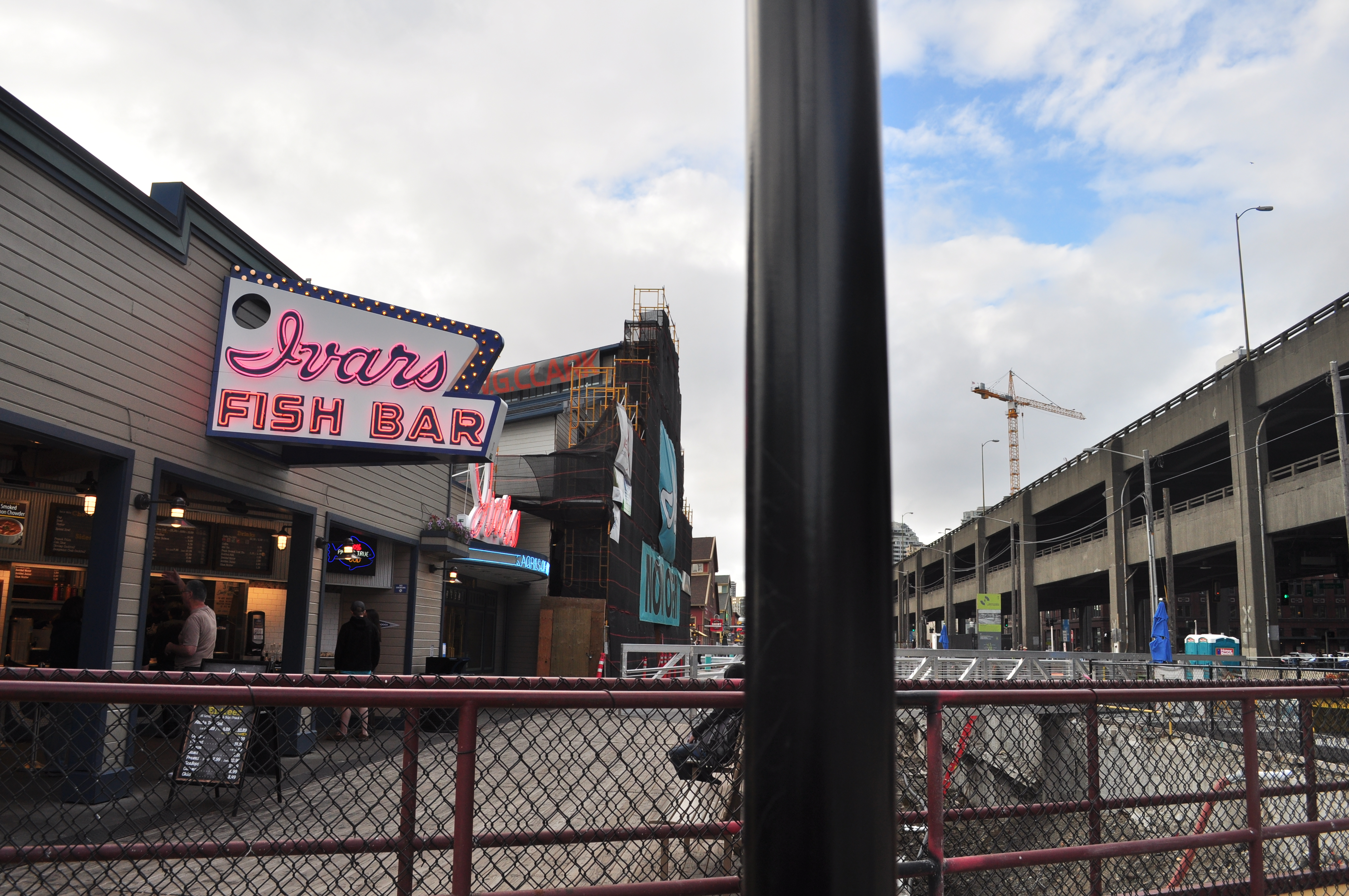
Ivar's Fish Bar during 2015 replacement of the Alaskan Way Seawall. Ivar's Acres of Clams and Ye Olde Curiosity Shop are in the shrouded pier shed at center. Alaskan Way Viaduct is at right.

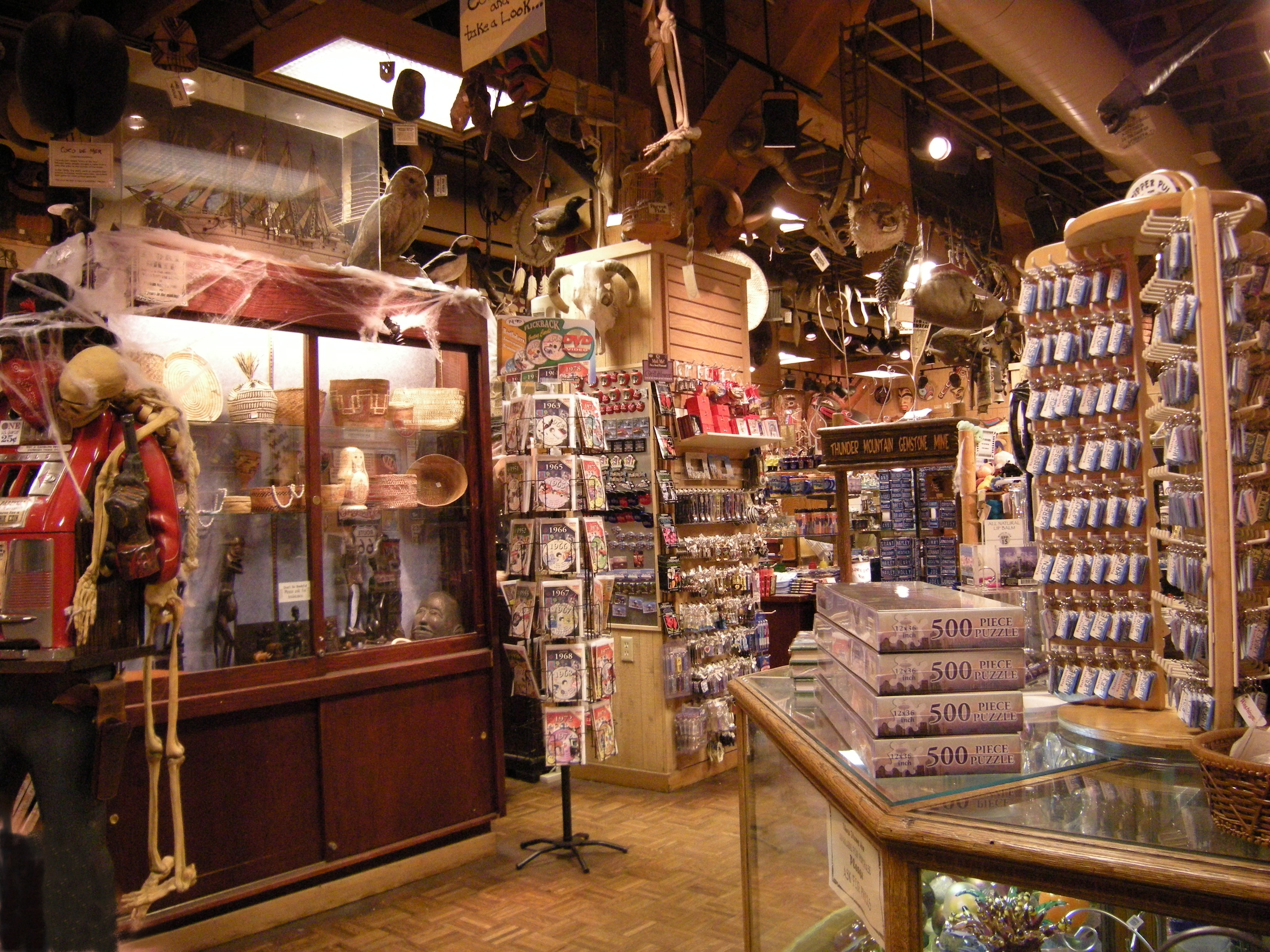
Interior of Ye Olde Curiosity Shop, 2008

Since 1988, Pier 54 has been home not only to Ivar's Acres of Clams, but also to Ye Olde Curiosity Shop. Founded in 1899, Ye Olde Curiosity Shop is one of the Seattle waterfront's oldest existing businesses.

== See also ==
- Central Waterfront, Seattle
