= Grand Trunk Pacific dock =

Wharf in Seattle (1910–1964)

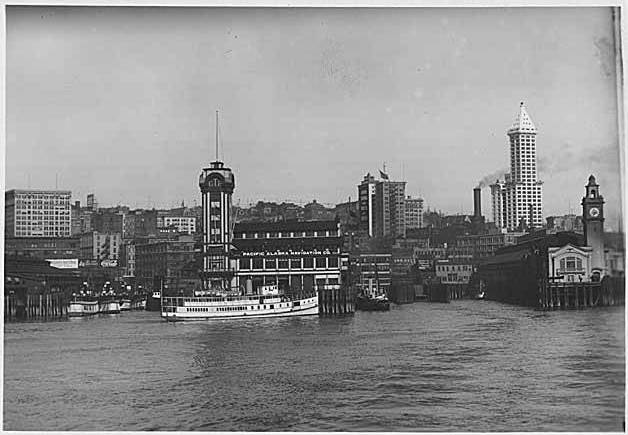
- Grand Trunk Pacific dock (tower on left), circa 1913.
- Type: shipping pier and warehouse
- Location: Seattle, Washington
- Coordinates: 47°36′13″N 122°20′20″W
- Owner: Grand Trunk Pacific Railway

Characteristics
- Total length: 605 ft (184.4 m)
- Width: 116 ft (35.4 m)

History
- Opening date: 1910
- Closure date: 1964

The Grand Trunk Pacific dock was a shipping pier in Seattle, Washington. The original pier was built in 1910 and was destroyed in a fire in 1914. The pier was then rebuilt and continued in existence until 1964, when it was dismantled. The area where the pier stood is now part of the Seattle terminal of the Washington State Ferry system.

== Location ==
The Grand Trunk Pacific dock was located at the foot of Madison Street. The dock area had previously been used a wharf for the steamship Flyer. The Grand Trunk Pacific dock was located immediately to the north of Colman Dock, with the small U-shaped dock for the West Seattle ferry in between. Immediately to the north of the Grand Trunk dock was used by the Seattle fire department's fireboat Duwamish. The next pier north of the Seattle fire boat dock was the still existing Pier 54, previously known as Pier 3 or the Galbraith dock.

== Construction ==
The Grand Trunk Pacific Railway dock stood just north of Colman Dock at the foot of Marion Street. The original dock was built in 1910 as the largest wooden pier on the West Coast. Construction of the dock required 5,000 timber pilings and 3,700,000 board feet of lumber. As built, the dock had a prominent tower on the water end that was 130 ft (39.6 m) high. The upper story of the dock was used for offices.

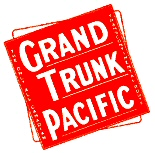

The dock was built by the Grand Trunk Pacific Railway, a Canadian company that built the second Canadian transcontinental railway and that also had interests in steamship lines. In 1910, the company had two new steamships built, the Prince Rupert and the Prince George, which used the Grand Trunk dock as their Seattle terminal. The Prince Rupert and the Prince George each could carry 1,500 day passengers, and also had 220 staterooms for longer runs. The Grand Trunk Railway employed them in competition with the steamships of the Canadian Pacific Railway on the "Triangle Route", which ran between Seattle, Victoria, and Vancouver, British Columbia. The Grand Trunk liners also ran from the dock to the railway line's western terminus in Prince Rupert, British Columbia. The liners arrived in 1910, even though the first train did not reach Prince Rupert until 1914.

== Destruction by fire ==
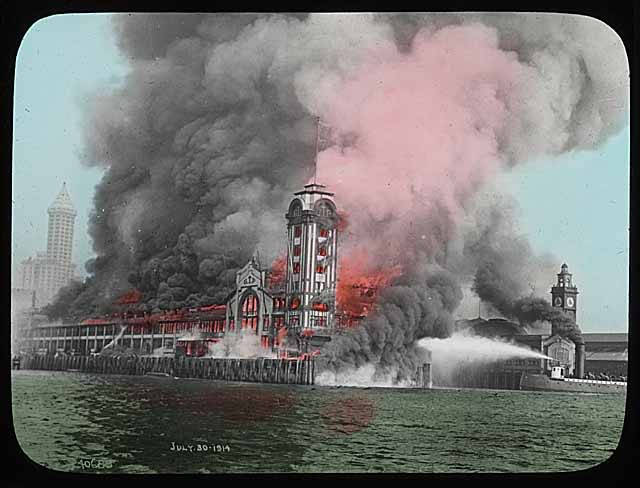
Grand Trunk Pacific dock on fire. Fireboat Duwamish at right fighting fire. Hand-tinted photograph.

On July 30, 1914, the dock was destroyed by an explosion and massive fire. One source reports that the cause was a spark from a cigarette or cigar landing in a pile of sawdust. When the fire broke out, two vessels were moored alongside, the wooden inland steamboat Athlon and the coastal steamship Admiral Farragut. According to one source, Athlon's engineer first noticed the fire at about 3:00 pm. He alerted the Seattle Fire Department. Another source says that it was the wharfinger who noticed the fire at about 3:40 pm and raised the alarm.

Although the fire spread rapidly through the dock, fueled by the creosote-saturated piers and timbers of the pier, both Athlon and Admiral Farragut were brought off the dock without damage.

Engine Company No. 5 of the Seattle Fire Department responded to the alarm and drove out on the dock. According to the Seattle Post-Intelligencer, "'they said they were just standing there – and the very air around them seemed to turn to flame. The fire engine's fuel tank, holding fifty gallons of gasoline, exploded, burning many of the firemen. Two firemen, Patrick Cooper and John Stokes, were trapped in the fire. Badly burned, both had to jump into the water to safe themselves. Cooper died three days later and Stokes was never able to return to full duty as a fireman.

Fire companies responded from all around the city. The fireboats Duwamish and Snoqualmie fought the fire, and, with the aid of the revenue cutter Unalga they were able to keep the fire from destroying the adjacent Colman Dock, although that dock did sustain $10,000 in damages.

Five people died and 29 more, including 10 firemen, were injured. The fire burned for two hours, and attracted a large number of onlookers, including the mayor of Seattle. Some people took advantage of the fire to loot nearby businesses, including Ye Olde Curiosity Shop, a business still in existence as of 2014, which was then located at Colman Dock.

== Later history ==
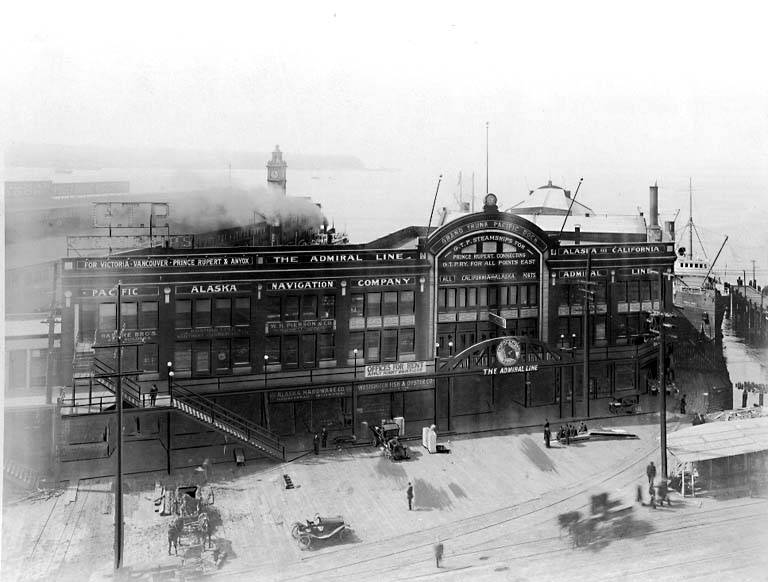
The rebuilt Grand Trunk Pacific dock, circa 1920.

A replacement dock, without a watchtower, was promptly built, and survived until 1964, when it was replaced by waiting area for automobiles boarding ferries at the new ferry terminal.

In 1917, the new dock measured 605 by 116 feet, with 1,200 feet of berthing space, with a cargo storage capacity of 12,000 tons. There was a storage room on the second floor of the warehouse which was served by an elevator with a 400 ton capacity. The wharf as it existed in 1917 was said to have been "semi-fireproof." There were adjustable passenger slips and a depressed railway track for loading freight cars. There were offices and waiting rooms on the street end. Like Colman Dock, the Grand Trunk dock had an overhead bridge to the Seattle business district. Depth of water alongside the dock was 55 feet.

Heavy construction costs and economic dislocation during World War I caused the bankruptcy of the Grand Trunk Pacific in 1920. The line was taken over by the government of Canada and operated as a division of the Canadian National Railway. In 1927, the Kitsap County Transportation Company (KCTC) and Puget Sound Freight Lines (PSFL) formed a joint venture company called the Ferry Dock Company, which took out a long-term lease on the Grand Trunk Pacific dock, which was then in a rundown condition. The dock became the main terminal and for both lines. In 1929, the stockholders of KCTC and PSFL reached agreement with Wilbur B. Foshay (b. 1887) to sell their companies, including the Ferry Dock Company, to Foshay, who was then assembling a utility and transportation business empire. Foshay however was financially ruined in the October 1929 stock market crash and the transaction never went through.

In August 1930, the Canadian Pacific Railway began using the Grand Trunk Pacific dock as the Seattle terminal for their ships on the Seattle-Victoria-Vancouver, British Columbia route.

In 1959 the Grand Trunk dock was used by the Black Ball Freight Service. In the early 1960s the dock was dismantled and the area where it stood became part of the Washington State Ferry terminal.

== See also ==
- Central Waterfront, Seattle
