= Inland Flyer =

Puget Sound passenger steamboat

- Inland Flyer backing away from a landing, circa 1904.

History
- Name: Inland Flyer
- Owner: La Conner Trading & Trans. Co.; Puget Sound Nav. Co.
- Route: Puget Sound, Hood Canal
- Completed: 1898
- Identification: US registry #100660
- Fate: Dismantled, machinery reused, hull converted to fish barge 1916

General characteristics
- Type: inland steamboat
- Tonnage: 151 gross; 103 regist.
- Length: 105.5 ft (32.16 m)
- Beam: 32.1 ft (9.78 m)
- Depth: 4.8 ft (1.46 m) depth of hold
- Installed power: triple expansion compound steam engine
- Propulsion: propeller
- Crew: fifteen (15)

Inland Flyer was a passenger steamboat that ran on Puget Sound from 1898 to 1916. From 1910 to 1916 this vessel was known as the Mohawk. The vessel is notable as the first steamer on Puget Sound to use oil fuel. Inland Flyer was one of the most famous vessels of the time on Puget Sound.

== Design and construction ==
Inland Flyer was built in 1898 at Portland, Oregon, and was originally intended to run between Portland, Astoria, and The Dalles. Capt. John Anderson, who later became closely linked with steamboat operations on Lake Washington, discovered Inland Flyer engineless and still under construction at the shipyard of Joseph Supple in Portland, and recommended her purchase to Joshua Green.

Anderson bought the hull, and sold it to Green and his associates who were doing business as La Conner Trading and Transportation Company. Anderson then installed the engines and the upper works himself in Portland, and brought the ship himself down the Columbia River and around the Olympic peninsula.

== Conversion to oil burner ==
On May 21, 1904 plans were announced in the press to convert Inland Flyer and Athlon from coal to oil fuel. The decision was reached after officials of the Puget Sound Navigation Company, including its president, Charles Peabody, had taken a test trip on the Northern Commercial Company's sidewheeler Sadie, which was intended for use in Alaska and had been fitted with oil fuel tanks and burned oil rather than wood or coal. Oil was thought to be both cleaner and as cheap or cheaper than coal. The conversion was planned to be complete in thirty days. Inland Flyer thus became the first steam vessel on Puget Sound to use oil fuel, rather than wood or coal, and was the first steamer operating on Puget Sound to use oil fuel.

== Operations ==
In 1901, La Conner Trading reached a joint operating agreement with H.B. Kennedy to run their steamers in alliance on the profitable Seattle-Bremerton route, which they called the Port Orchard Route. In 1902 Inland Flyer was on the Seattle – Port Orchard route, running with the Athlon, which was owned by H.B. Kennedy. There was a brief period of competition on this route in 1902 when the Manette, a boat owned by Tacoma interests, with businessman Fred H. Marvin acting as agent, was placed on the route. Manette was soon transferred to the Seattle – Alki run, and the competition ended.

In 1903 Inland Flyer came under the control of the Puget Sound Navigation Company when that company merged with La Conner Trading. Capt. Peter Falk (d.1924) one of the major shareholders of Puget Sound Navigation Co. served as one of masters of the Inland Flyer. Another captain was the veteran steamboat man William Mitchell (b. 1879). On May 23, 1903, Inland Flyer was among the steamboats that greeted President Theodore Roosevelt when he toured the Seattle and the Bremerton naval yard. In 1907 Inland Flyer was placed on the run from Seattle to Bremerton.

By 1904, La Conner Trading, by then a subsidiary of PSN, was operating jointly with H.B. Kennedy as the Navy Yard Route on the Seattle – Bremerton run. Disposing of three vessels, including Inland Flyer, Athlon, and the sternwheeler Port Orchard, the Navy Yard route ran six sailings a day from Seattle's Pier 2 to and from Bremerton.

== Rate wars ==
In 1905, the Puget Sound Navigation Company was engaged in a rate war on the Hood Canal route. There were only two steamers at that time that ran on Hood Canal, one was the Perdita, operated by Capt. W.W. McKenzie, and the other was PSN's Garland. PSN arranged to have McKenzie and Perdita bought off with an anti-competitive subsidy agreement, but this did not last, and McKenzie and Perdita were soon back on Hood Canal, driving down rates on Garland from $2.00 to 50 cents ton, with passengers carried from Seattle to any landing on the canal for 25 cents. In addition, PSN was forced to put the Inland Flyer on the Hood Canal route. Considered a speedy vessel, Inland Flyer, together with Garland brought the best steamboat service ever effected on Hood Canal. However, by the end of 1905, PSN resolved the problem of competition from Perdita by purchasing the rival vessel.

The first decade of the 1900s was probably the high point of steamboat operations in Puget Sound. The vessels would never been as profitable as they were then. During 1907, when the Puget Sound Navigation Company was involved in a rate war with the Kitsap County Transportation Company, Inland Flyer was shifted to the Seattle – Poulsbo route as part of the business maneuvers in the competition. Greene, who was by then a millionaire, and owned more steamboats than any other person on Puget Sound, was criticized in at least one newspaper for his supposed ruthlessness in dealing with Warren L. Gazzam, the chief of the Kitsap County Transportation Co.

In 1908, the Port Blakely Mill Company decided to run its steamer Monticello 2 in competition with the Navy Yard Route's steamers, including Inland Flyer. On July 9, 1909, at the wreck of the Yosemite, Inland Flyer stood by with other vessels to assist, helping make sure there was no loss of life when the big excursion sidewheeler went on the rocks near Bremerton. In 1910 the Navy Yard Route sold Inland Flyer to Capt. F.G. Reeve, who was doing business as the Port Washington Route. He renamed the vessel Mohawk.

== Disposition ==
Wooden steamboats had a useful life of about 20 years, although their components could be reused, sometimes for much longer. In 1916, Mohawk (ex Inland Flyer) was dismantled. The engine was placed in a new vessel, the steamer F.G. Reeve, with the hull going to Neah Bay to serve as a fish-receiving barge.
