= Alice Gertrude =

US wooden steamship (1898–1907)

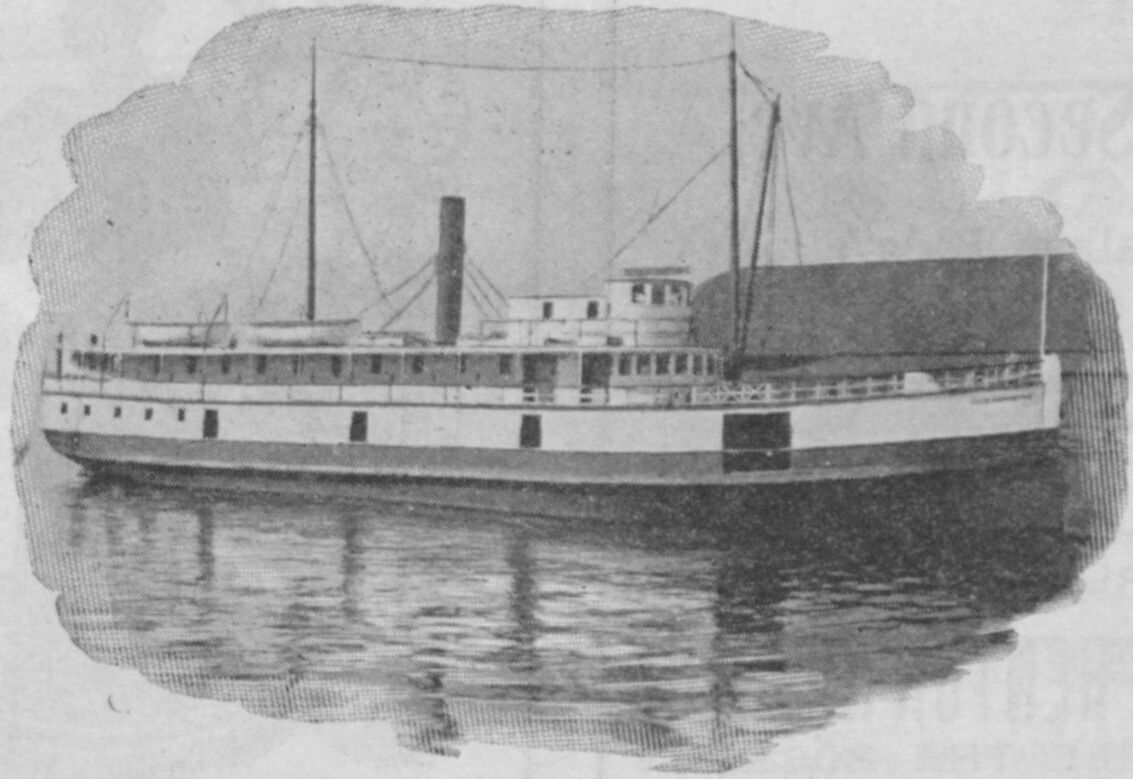
- Alice Gertrude

History
- Name: Alice Gertrude
- Namesake: Alice Thompson and Gertrude Thompson
- Owner: Thompson Steamboat Co.
- Route: Strait of Juan de Fuca, Puget Sound
- In service: 1898
- Fate: Wrecked January 11, 1907

General characteristics
- Type: Coastal steamship
- Tonnage: 413 GRT
- Length: 131 ft (39.93 m)
- Beam: 26 ft (7.92 m)
- Installed power: fore and aft compound steam engine, generating 500 hp (370 kW).
- Propulsion: propeller

Alice Gertrude was a wooden steamship which operated on the Strait of Juan de Fuca and Puget Sound from 1898 to January 1907, when she was wrecked at Clallam Bay in Washington.

== Career ==
Alice Gertrude was a freight and passenger steamship built in 1898, either at Seattle, Washington, according to one source, or at Port Angeles. Washington, according to another source. The ship was built either by or for the brothers John Rex Thompson and Fred Thompson, who were prominent citizens of early Port Angeles doing business as the Thompson Steamboat Company. The Thompsons ran steamboats to Neah Bay from Port Angeles, and Alice Gertrude was built for this route. The vessel was named for two cousins, Alice Thompson, the daughter of Fred Thompson, and Gertrude Thompson, the daughter of John Rex Thompson.

On January 8, 1902, Captain J. Rex Thompson sold his interest in the Thompson Steamboat Company, which included Alice Gertrude and five other steam vessels, to the La Conner Trading and Transportation Company. In 1903, the La Conner Trading and Transportation Company merged with the Puget Sound Navigation Company (PSN), and Alice Gertrude became part of the PSN fleet.

In 1904, Alice Gertrude and another PSN ship, Rosalie, ran on alternate days, six days a week, from Pier 1 in Seattle, which was at the foot of Yesler Street, for Port Townsend, Washington, and the ports on the Strait of Juan de Fuca. Rosalie's route ended at Clallam, Washington, with Alice Gertrude proceeding further to Neah Bay.

== Wreck ==
On January 11, 1907, under the command of Captain Charles Kalstrom, a well-known and popular captain, Alice Gertrude was wrecked while trying to enter Clallam Bay. Kalstrom, who had been on the route for 16 years, encountered a severe snowstorm at about 9:00 p.m. With visibility blocked, Kalstrom was putting the ship about, when at 10:15 p.m., the vessel struck ground on Clallam Reef. The passengers and crew remained on board until the morning, when, with the assistance of the steam tugs Lorne and Wyadda, they were all taken off. The steamer Rosalie took the passengers back to Port Angeles. The financial loss was valued at $40,000.

Alice Gertrude broke up quickly and the only salvageable parts were the boiler and the engine, which were removed from the wreck by the steam cargo ship Rapid Transit. These components belonged to the marine insurance underwriter, but PSN repurchased them and they were installed in the steam fishing vessel Independent.
