= La Conner Trading and Transportation Company =

American company

La Conner Trading & Transportation Co.
- Successor: Puget Sound Navigation Company
- Headquarters: Seattle, Washington

The La Conner Trading and Transportation Company was founded in the early 1900s by Joshua Green and others, to engage in the shipping business on Puget Sound.

== Formation ==
The La Conner Trading and Transportation Company was formed in the early 1890s by four officers of the steamer Henry Bailey, Joshua Green, purser, Sam Denny, master, Peter Falk, mate, and Frank Zickmund, second engineer. Green persuaded the others to leave the Henry Bailey and go into business for themselves, by purchasing the freight steamer Fannie Lake and a scow, for a total investment of about $5000. Green at the time had savings of only about $250 and the others had very little. However they were able to secure loans of $1,250 each, secured by the steamer and the scow, from banker Jacob Furth and the Puget Sound National Bank.

== Operations ==
Running in the freight business, the company was not competing for passenger fares. Instead the new firm's main competition came from George T. Willey, a Seattle hay and grain merchant. As business increased, the four partners bought another steamer, the Annie M. Pence. Willey then joined with the four original partners and they incorporated the business as the La Conner Trading and Transportation Company.

The company suffered business reverses. In April 1893, Fannie Lake was destroyed by a fire that started in a cargo of hay. The vessel was valued at $5,000 and insured for only $4,000. An economic depression called the Panic of 1893 hit the company hard, and things got worse when the company's other hay steamer, the uninsurable Anna M. Pence, was also destroyed by fire.

Green had the idea to purchase a new boat, which he would name after the builder, which he concluded would save up to $2,000 off the price of the boat. Builders were willing to build for less if the completed vessel were to be named after the builder, as it would function as a floating advertisement. In this way, the company acquired the T.W. Lake built by the shipbuilder of the same name. The Lake was purpose-built to move freight, and included a winch to lift cargo up to piers, regardless of the state of the tide.

== Expansion of business ==
Following the purchase of the Lake, the company continued to expand, adding the steamers E.D. Smith, Utopia, George E. Starr, and the sternwheelers State of Washington, Fairhaven and La Conner to the roster. The company also built the City of Denver for Colorado investors. When the Colorado interests defaulted on payment, the company took over the boat and added to their fleet.

The company had also expanded into the passenger business, buying the fast steamer Inland Flyer and putting that vessel on the lucrative Seattle – Bremerton run in opposition to the Athlon, owned by H.B. Kennedy.

== Corporate changes ==
By 1902, Joshua Green had bought out Sam Denny's shares, and some of the stock of George T. Willey. Willey then sold the rest of his shares to the Alaska Steamship Company, of which Charles E. Peabody was president. This gave Peabody and Alaska Steam a controlling interest in La Conner Trading. Alaska Steam ran ships to Alaska and also had a large fleet of inland vessels operating on Puget Sound. The Puget Sound operations were conducted under the name of the Puget Sound Navigation Company. With the acquisition of La Conner Trading, PSN was almost doubled in the size of its fleet. After a period of transition, the La Conner company was effectively merged into the reorganized Puget Sound Navigation Company, which in later years came to dominate Puget Sound passenger and ferry business as a near-monopoly.
