= George E. Starr =

Steamboat of the Puget Sound Mosquito Fleet

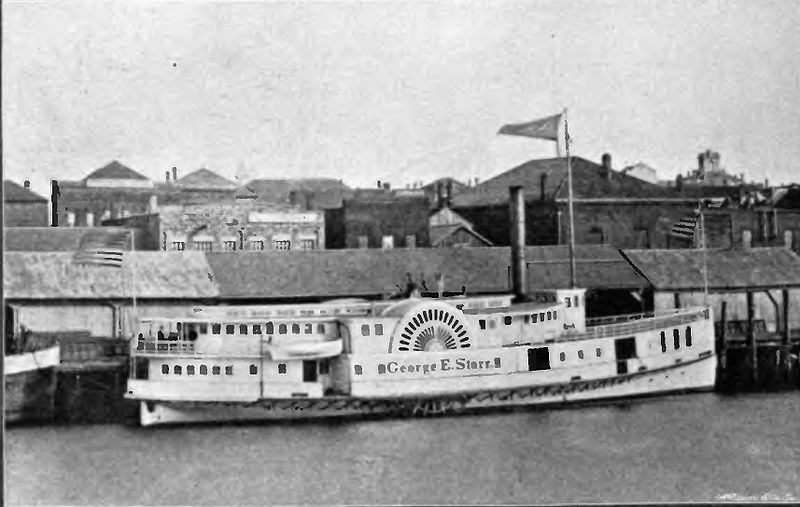
- George E. Starr

History

United States
- Name: George E. Starr
- Owner: Puget Sound Steam Navigation Company’s (the "Starr Line"); La Conner Trading & Trans. Co.
- Route: Puget Sound, Strait of Georgia, Admiralty Inlet, Strait of Juan de Fuca, Alaska, Columbia River, California
- Builder: J.F.T. Mitchell shipyard at Seattle
- Completed: 1878
- In service: 1879
- Out of service: 1921
- Fate: Abandoned, Lake Union

General characteristics
- Type: Inland steamship
- Tonnage: 473
- Length: 148 ft (45 m)
- Beam: 28 ft (9 m)
- Depth: 9 ft (3 m) depth of hold
- Decks: three (freight, passenger, boat)
- Installed power: single-cylinder walking beam steam engine
- Propulsion: sidewheels

The steamboat George E. Starr operated in late 19th century as part of the Puget Sound Mosquito Fleet and also operated out of Victoria, B.C. Geo. E. Starr also served for a time in California and on the Columbia River.

== Construction ==
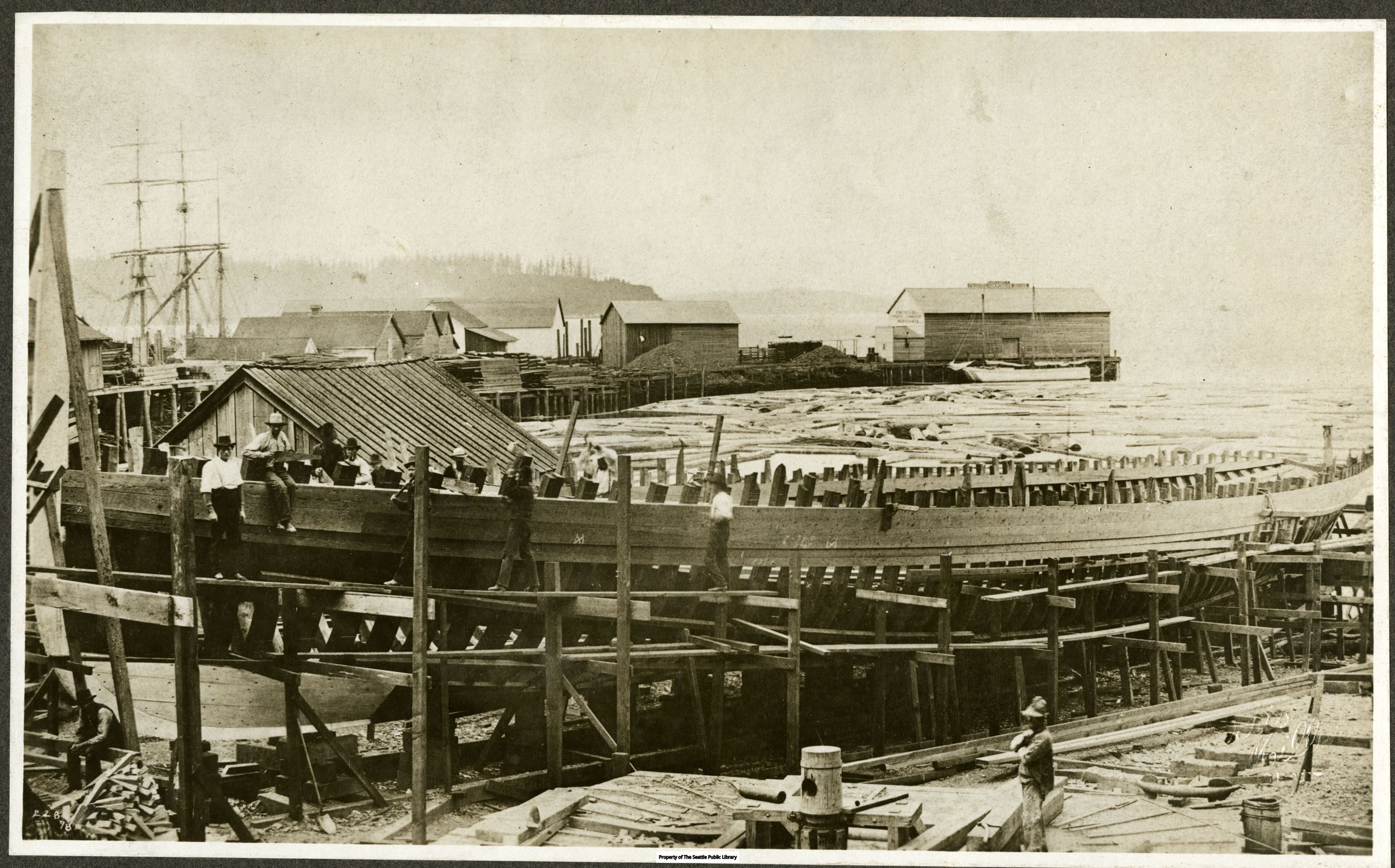
Geo. E. Starr under construction. This shows the heavy wooden ribs used to construct the hull of the Geo. E. Starr. This is also a good image of an early shipyard on Puget Sound. A hand-turned windlass, used to haul vessels out of the water and up onto the ways, can be seen in the foreground of the image. (Seattle Public Library dates this 1879, which contradicts Newell, cited in this article for the date of launch.)

Geo. E. Starr was built at Seattle in 1878 at the shipyard of J.F.T Mitchell for the Puget Sound Steam Navigation Company's (the "Starr Line") international route to Victoria, B.C. Starr was a sidewheel steamer with a single-cylinder walking-beam engine, 148' long, 28' in beam over the hull, and 9 foot depth of hold, and rated at 473 tons.

== Early operations ==
In 1881, the Oregon Railway and Navigation Company, under Henry Villard bought out the Starr Line and all their steamers, including Geo. E. Starr, Isabel, Alida, Otter, and Annie Stewart. The new management ran Geo. E. Starr hard in a rate war with an older sidewheeler on the Sound, Eliza Anderson. In 1889, the Eliza Anderson nearly sank Geo. E. Starr in a fog-bound collision off Coupeville. In 1892, the Starr was transferred south to California for a year. When she returned, she was under the control of the Northwest Steamship Company, and ran between Seattle, Port Townsend and the mill ports.

== Purchase by Joshua Green ==
George E. Starr was one of the first vessels, along with the sternwheeler Fannie Lake, Annie M. Pence, Utopia, and Rapid Transit, purchased by Joshua Green and his partners of the La Conner Trading and Transportation Company. Geo. E. Starr was considered sufficiently elegant at that time to allow President Rutherford B. Hayes, visiting Seattle, to spend a night in one of her cabins.

== Transfer to Alaska ==
When the Alaska Gold Rush started in 1897, many older vessels were pressed into service in an effort to make money off gold seekers headed for the north country. Geo. E. Starr was no exception. Under Capt. E.E. Caine, the Starr was made ready to, and did in fact depart for Skagway and Dyea on August 3, 1897, with 90 passengers and a cargo of 100 horses.

== Return to Puget Sound ==
Geo. E. Starr survived her service in Alaska, and by 1904 was running in Puget Sound again, under the ownership of the La Conner Trading and Transportation Company. On alternating days, Starr and Utopia left Pier 2, at the foot of Yesler Street in Seattle bound for Whatcom, Fairhaven, and Anacortes, with the Starr on her trips going on to Blaine where travelers could make connection with a steamer bound for Point Roberts. On this run, Starr and Utopia were competing against the Bellingham (ex Willapa, ex General Miles) of the Bellingham Bay Transportation Company.

== Reputation as slow boat ==
Geo. E. Starr served a long time, and towards the end she acquired the reputation as a very slow boat, as shown by the following waterfront doggerel:

Paddle, paddle, George E. Starr, How we wonder where you are. Leaves Seattle at half past ten. Gets to Bellingham, God knows when!

As you creep across the bight, We can see your masthead light,

Out upon the bay so far, Paddle, paddle George E. Starr.

Maneuvering the old boat was difficult, as when making turns, she would list over and not right herself, which, as she was a sidewheeler, caused her to spin round and round in circles. To prevent this from happening, her skipper, Capt. Gunder Hansen set up a counterbalance on the deck consisting of an old cart loaded with two or three tons of old anchor chain, rigged to cross the deck with a traveler arrangement of block and tackle. Captain Hansen, a native of Norway, instructed all deck hands: "When I yingle the bell, you move the car," which resulted in Captain Hansen's becoming known on the Sound as Yingle Bell Yohnny.

Despite all this, Joshua Green remained fond of Geo. E. Starr, remarking sometimes when she was particularly tardy: "The Starr must have an exceptionally fine load of freight this trip to be this late." Later, Green wrote of the Starr:

This was a faithful little boat. If you put a load on her the side paddlewheels went so far down into the water she would hardly go ahead! She ran from Bellingham to Seattle. We had a full load of canned salmon on her and she was so slow it cost us more to feed the passengers than the passage money amounted to. We had a peck of troubles in those days, too. It wasn’t all easy sailing.

== Transfer to Columbia River ==
Near the end of her career, Geo. E. Starr was transferred to the Columbia River, where she worked as a tow boat.

== Final disposition ==
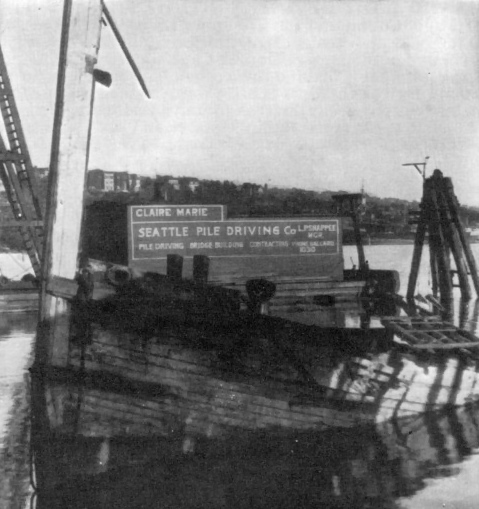
Hulk of George E. Starr.

Geo. E. Starr was abandoned about 1921 in (or was eventually towed to) Lake Union, where she rotted and slowly sank.
