= Henry Bailey (sternwheeler) =

1888 steamboat used on Puget Sound

- Henry Bailey

History
- Name: Henry Bailey
- Completed: 1888
- Out of service: 1898
- Fate: Scrapped
- Notes: Machinery and upper works installed in new hull, resulting vessel was named Skagit Queen

General characteristics
- Type: Inland steamboat
- Tonnage: 271.20 gross; 209.59 net tons
- Length: 108.5 ft (33.07 m)
- Beam: 25 ft (7.62 m)
- Depth of hold: 4.7 ft (1.43 m)
- Installed power: twin steam engines, horizontally mounted, each with a bore of 12 inches (30.5 cm) and stroke 72 inches (182.9 cm)
- Propulsion: Sternwheel

Henry Bailey was a sternwheel steamboat that operated on Puget Sound from 1888 to 1910. The vessel was named after Henry Bailey, a steamboat captain in the 1870s who lived in Ballard, Washington.

== Career ==
Henry Bailey was built at Tacoma, Washington as the first vessel for the Pacific Navigation Company. The vessel was placed on a route which ran from Seattle to Snohomish, via Edmonds, Marysville, Mukilteo, Lowell. At some point in the 1890s the name of the vessel was later changed to City of Champaigne. In 1898, at West Seattle, the upper works and the machinery were removed and reinstalled in a new vessel, the Skagit Queen.

== Prominent officers ==
In 1888, the officers of the Henry Bailey included Capt. Sam Denny, mate Peter Falk, Engineer Frank Zikmund, and purser Joshua Green. Green induced the other three men to join together in business, and they eventually formed, with the participation of George J. Willey, a hay in grain merchant, to form the successful shipping concern known as the La Conner Trading and Transportation Company.
