= Athlon (steamboat) =

Passenger boat built in 1900

- Athlon

History

United States
- Name: Athlon
- Builder: J. H. Johnston
- Launched: 1900
- In service: 1900
- Out of service: 1921
- Fate: Sunk after grounding, 1921
- Notes: Converted to oil fuel 1906

General characteristics
- Type: Express passenger steamship
- Tonnage: 157 GRT; 104 NRT
- Length: 112.4 ft (34.3 m)
- Beam: 19.7 ft (6.0 m)
- Draft: 7 ft (2.1 m)
- Propulsion: Compound engine as built, re-engined 1907 with triple expansion, 66-inch propeller, with 96-inch pitch
- Notes: all-wooden construction, steam-powered

Athlon was a typical passenger steamboat of the Puget Sound Mosquito Fleet.

== Construction ==
Athlon was built in Portland, Oregon by the J. H. Johnston yard. Her first owners were a consortium of Jacob Kamm (and his company, Vancouver Transportation Co.), Shaver Transportation Company and the Kellogg Transportation Company. The consortium built her at a cost of $4,950. The consortium's purpose was to Captain Neusome, owner of the Iralda, which he ran on the lower Columbia River. Neusome had refused to fix (or "cooperate on," as the phrase then was) steamboat rates on river. Neusome came around when Athlon was launched, and struck a deal with the consortium. In return, Athlon was sold to H.B. Kennedy, who took her up to Puget Sound.

== Career ==
Once at Puget Sound, H. B. Kennedy put Athlon on the popular Seattle-Port Orchard (Navy Yard) Route, in competition with Joshua Green's boat, the Inland Flyer. Athlon's first captain on Puget Sound, in February 1901, was William Mitchell, who had worked his way up from cabin boy. (Mitchell eventually in 1933 became manager of the Kitsap Transportation Company, one of the last remaining competitors to the by-then dominant Puget Sound Navigation Company.) By July 1901, H. B. Kennedy and Joshua Green reached a deal to end competition between their two boats, fixing rates on the route as was usual with these anti-competitive agreements. Over the years, the firms of H. B. Kennedy and Joshua Green's Puget Sound Navigation Company drew closer together and eventually merged. By 1903, Athlon was still owned by H. B. Kennedy personally, but was being operated by Puget Sound Navigation. This combination drove off all would be competitors including the Manette, and later, Arrow, even though Arrow was a much faster boat than Athlon, beating her by 30 minutes on a race from Seattle to Bremerton.

In January 1904, the steamer Clallam and 50 of her passengers were lost en route to Victoria crossing the Strait of Juan de Fuca. Clallam carried no distress rockets, which in those days before radio, might have saved some or all of her people. Steamship inspectors cracked down and fined a large number of steamers, including Athlon, $500 and more for operating without fog horns, signal flares or rockets, fire axes or proper life-saving equipment. Some measure of the severity of the fine can be judged by the fact that it was almost exactly 10% of the cost of Athlon's construction.

In 1907, Athlon's compound engine was replaced with a triple expansion steam engine. About the same time, she was converted to oil fuel, in response to the oil companies launching a push to persuade the steamboat operators to convert from burning cord wood or coal to burning oil. H. D. Collier, a marine engineer, was then Standard Oil's representative in the Puget Sound region. When he approached Joshua Green to consider conversion to oil fuel, Green declined, telling him "Harry, that stuff blows up!" To prove the contrary, Collier rigged up an oil burner under Athlon's boiler, then dropped a lighted match in the oil tank. When no explosion ensued, Collier had made his sale. Collier later became president and chairman of the board of Standard Oil of California.

Starting in late 1890s, the United States Congress became more concerned about working conditions, safety equipment and standards on steamboats. Political pressure increased after the sinking of RMS Titanic which foundered in the North Atlantic with a large loss of lives due to too few lifeboats. Athlon's owners, prominent capitalists, opposed this, and when a version of what eventually became the La Follette Seaman's Act of 1915 passed Congress in 1913, Athlon was used by the Puget Sound Steamboat Owners Association in a stunt to point out what they perceived as some of the absurdities of the legislation. The owners calculated that based on the number of passengers that Athlon was licensed to carry, she would have to be equipped with 19 lifeboats, this on a steamboat only 112 feet (34 m) long. They were able to cram only eight boats on her decks, and put the other eleven in a scow lashed alongside. Using this and other tactics, the steamboat owners of Puget Sound and the rest of the country were able to stall passage of the Seamen's Act until 1915.

The Moe brothers were engaged in competition with the Kitsap County Transportation Company for dominance of the Seattle-Poulsbo route. In 1914, the Moe Brothers, with backers on Bainbridge Island and around Liberty Bay, bought Athlon and put her on the route, where she ran for the next six years.

On July 30, 1914, Athlon and the coastal liner Admiral Farragut were moored in Seattle at the pier of the Grand Trunk Pacific, immediately to the north of Colman Dock. About 3:00 in the afternoon, the engineer on Athlon noticed a fire on the pier. Athlon and Admiral Farragut quickly cast off. The fire on the pier spread quickly, as the structure was newly built (four years old) and covered with creosote. Fire boats and land crews unsuccessfully fought the flames. Four firemen were killed.

=== Loss ===
On August 1, 1921, in a heavy fog while running into Port Ludlow, Athlon struck the Ludlow Rocks at the harbor entrance. Athlon struck at extreme high tide, and at low tide it was possible to walk all around the boat. The nine people aboard all reached safety, but the vessel was a total loss. Her owners, Poulsbo Transportation Co., were able to salvage her machinery.
