= Annie M. Pence =

1890 steamboat in United States

History
- Name: Annie M. Pence
- Owner: La Conner Trading & Trans. Co.
- Completed: 1890
- Out of service: June 1895
- Fate: Destroyed by fire
- Notes: Hull salvaged, used to build T.W. Lake in 1896.

General characteristics
- Type: Inland steamboat
- Tonnage: 95.15 NRT
- Length: 89 ft (27.13 m)
- Beam: 18.7 ft (5.70 m)
- Depth of hold: 6.2 ft (1.89 m)
- Installed power: twin steam engines, horizontally mounted
- Propulsion: sternwheel

Annie M. Pence is a steamboat that ran on Puget Sound in the early 1890s.

== Career ==
Annie M. Pence was built at Lummi Island in 1890. The boat was a sternwheeler intended to carry freight. For most of the career of Annie M. Pence, the vessel was under the command of Capt. Peter Falk, who was also one of their owners. Annie M. Pence was purchased by the La Conner Trading and Transportation Company as one of the company's first steamboats. Annie M. Pence was destroyed by a fire 21 June 1895 near Point Lowell in Puget Sound. Her crew escaped to a scow she was towing, except for her Cook who drowned. The hull was still usable, and was incorporated into the construction of the propeller steamer T.W. Lake in 1896.

== Bibliography ==
- Newell, Gordon R., Ships of the Inland Sea, Superior, Seattle WA (2nd Ed. 1960)
- Newell, Gordon R., ed., H.W. McCurdy Marine History of the Pacific Northwest, Superior Publishing Co., Seattle, WA (1966)
- E. W. Wright (1895). Lewis & Dryden's Marine History of the Pacific Northwest: An Illustrated Review of the Growth and Development of the Maritime Industry, from the Advent of the Earliest Navigators to the Present Time, with Sketches and Portraits of a Number of Well Known Marine Men. Portland, Oregon: Lewis & Dryden Printing Company.
