= Clallam (steamboat) =

Ship

- Clallam

History
- Name: Clallam
- Owner: Puget Sound Navigation Company
- Builder: Shipyard of Edward Heath in Tacoma
- Cost: 80,000 US Dollar
- Christened: April 15, 1903
- Completed: 1903
- Maiden voyage: July 3, 1903
- Out of service: 1904
- Fate: Sunk, January 8, 1904, Strait of Juan de Fuca

General characteristics
- Tonnage: 657-tons
- Length: 168 ft (51 m)
- Beam: 32 ft (9.8 m)
- Installed power: 800 hp (600 kW) compound engine
- Propulsion: propeller-drive
- Speed: 13 kn (24 km/h)
- Capacity: 250
- Crew: 31

The steamboat Clallam operated for about six months from July 1903 to January 1904 in Puget Sound and the Strait of Juan de Fuca. She was sunk in a storm on what should have been an ordinary voyage to Victoria, British Columbia.

== Construction ==
Clallam was built in 1903 at the shipyard of Edward Heath (1864–1934) in Tacoma. Clallam was 168' long, 32' on the beam, with 13' depth of hold and rated at 657-tons. Her hull was built of Douglas fir.

Her propeller was nine feet in diameter. It was driven by a double-expansion steam engine with a high-pressure cylinder 17 inches in diameter and a low-pressure cylinder 42 inches in diameter, with a stroke of 28 inches. Her engine was built by Heffernan Engine Works of Seattle. Steam to power the engine was provided by two boilers built by Lake Erie Boiler Works of Buffalo, New York. Her machinery allowed her to cruise at 13 knots (24 km/h).

She had 44 staterooms. Clallam was commissioned by the Puget Sound Navigation Company to run with another steamer, Majestic on the route from Tacoma to Seattle, Port Townsend and Victoria. During her launching on April 15, 1903, the woman who swung the bottle of champagne at her bow missed, and when the U.S. flag was unfurled, it was upside down, a sign of distress. These were deemed unlucky signs by the superstitious among the waterfront and marine trades.

== Sinking ==
=== Premonition ===
Known as "the bell sheep's premonition" after the fact; an odd event occurred to the Clallam in Seattle as she was loading her northbound passengers and freight at Pier 1, at the foot of Yesler Way. Black Ball Line steamers often carried sheep bound for Port Townsend and Victoria along with a trained mascot or bell sheep which always led the herd aboard. On this occasion, the bell sheep that usually made the voyage absolutely refused to board the vessel and was finally left behind when the ship departed Seattle at 8:30 a.m.

=== Last seen in distress ===
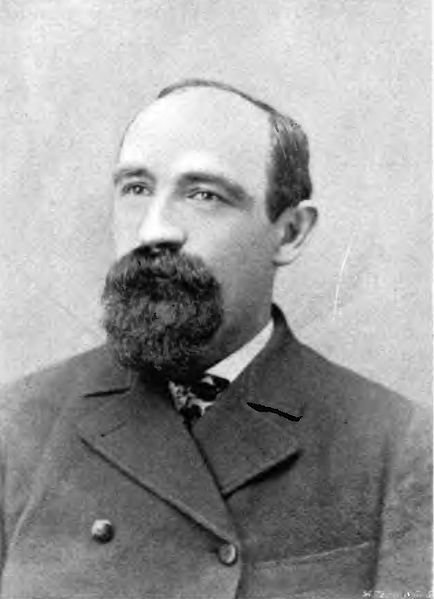
Capt. George Roberts (photograph taken before 1895)

On the morning of Friday, January 8, 1904, Clallam left Tacoma on her regular run, in command of Capt. George Roberts, then 55 years old and a veteran of 29 years marine service. She picked up passengers and freight, first in Seattle, then Port Townsend, where she cleared customs, then at 12:15 departed Port Townsend, heading north across the Strait of Juan de Fuca bound for Victoria. Clallam should have reached Victoria at about 4:00 p.m.

The wind was rising as she left, and eventually reached speeds of up to 36 miles (58 km) an hour in the Straits and up to 60 miles (97 km) an hour further west at Tatoosh Island at the entrance to the strait. Still, Clallam nearly reached safety, as about 5:00 p.m. she was seen from the Canada coast, near Trial Island dead in the water and rolling heavily. Afterwards she was observed to be running eastwards before the wind, away from Vancouver Island towards the San Juan Islands.

=== Search efforts mounted ===
The company's agent at Victoria, Edward E. Blackwood, seeing Clallam in distress, began a frantic effort to find a tug to go out to her. All the Canadian seagoing tugs were absent from port, and the little harbor tugs refused to go out into the gale. The little Canadian steamer Iroquois was docked at Sidney, on Vancouver Island. Blackwood was able to get word to the Iroquois' master that Clallam was missing and he agreed to take his vessel out into the storm to search for her. Waves broke clear over the bridge on Iroquois. Unable to find Clallam, Iroquois returned to port at midnight, or 11:00 p.m. (Iroquois herself was in very serious danger during the storm, and in fact was sunk herself in similar circumstances during a storm in the Gulf Islands on April 10, 1911, with 14 people drowned.) Over in Port Townsend, the dispatcher of the Puget Sound Tug Boat Company sent the tugs Sea Lion (from Seattle) and Richard Holyoke (from Port Townsend) to look for Clallam. Richard Holyoke departed Port Townsend at about 7:30 p.m. The Location of Clallam would prove difficult, as contrary to law, she carried no distress signal rockets.

=== Rising water on board ===
As the gale rose in the Strait, First Officer George W. Doney was in command at the pilot house, while Captain Roberts was resting in his cabin. As the ship's rolling increased, Captain Roberts, realizing the ship was in distress, came to the pilot house. Chief Engineer Scott A. DeLaunay called up the speaking tube to report that a deadlight (a shutter fastened over a ship's porthole in stormy weather) had been smashed in and the ship was taking on water. Captain Roberts sent Doney to find out what was happening.

It turned out that the deadlight, which had been previously broken and then repaired, but not apparently very well, had been smashed in by the storm waves. Engineer De Launay went to the pilot house and reported in person the situation to Captain Roberts. Roberts went down to the engine room, where he found it was waist deep in water. The engineering staff had tried to plug up the hole using blankets stuffed in and held in place with nailed down boards. These efforts had obviously failed.

Just how this appalling situation had come about was never completely cleared up. Either Clallam's pumps were defective, clogged with coal or other debris or were operated incorrectly by chief engineer De Launay. Rather than evacuating water from the vessel, the pumps appear to have moved water into it. The backup pumps also failed. At about 3:00 p.m., the rising water quenched the vessel's boiler fire, leaving her without power.

==== Lowering the boats ====
At about 3:30 p.m., when the ship seemed as if it could not long stay afloat, Captain Roberts ordered the lifeboats lowered, and into them placed mostly women and children, but apparently no officers from the ship to command the boats, although four crewman and a passenger who was an experienced merchant officer went in the first boat. All three boats capsized or failed to properly launch, drowning all aboard them. Many of the men remaining on board watched their wives and children drown. One man was on his wedding trip. His bride drowned. Newell describes the scene:

The second boat was said to have been launched safely and was about to pull away from the ship's side when a fear-crazed man leaped into it from the hurricane deck shouting, 'By God, that boat don't go without me!' As he landed in the heavily loaded boat his heavy boots struck the head of one of the women, crushing her skull. Then the hero's floundering about turned the boat over and it sank. A young mother from the overturned boat floated by the steamer's side, a baby held high out of the water by her up-stretched arms. A man went over the side on a rope and had his hands on the child when a hissing wave snatched it away.

Other accounts state that the second boat capsized about 600 feet (180 m) from the steamer.

==== Clallam remains afloat ====
Those remaining on board began bailing out the ship with buckets, and she stayed afloat until the next morning, Saturday, January 9. Meanwhile, at about 10:35 p.m. on January 8, the steam tug Richard Holyoke, under the command of Capt. Robert Hall, found her. Captain Hall got a tow line on board and took Clallam under tow. This was in between Smith Island and San Juan Island. Although Victoria was closer, the weather conditions were such that it seemed best to head for the American shore. The tug Sea Lion joined them at about 1:00 a.m. on January 9.

==== Capsizing and sinking ====
Clallam never got to the shore. Captain Roberts realized she was about to founder and signaled the Holyoke to cast off the towline. Holyoke misunderstood Captain Roberts' signal to cast off the tow line, so it had to be cut lest the sinking Clallam drag Holyoke down with her. Clallam rolled over and sank quickly at about 1:15 a.m. The tugs then went to rescue the people in the water, saving most or all of the 36 who had remained aboard. Capt. Edward D. Hickman (1876–1928), then serving as mate on Richard Holyoke, dove into the icy water to rescue 15 people. He suffered from poor health as a result for a long time afterwards.

== Aftermath ==
The Tacoma Times subsequently reported that the wreck of the Clallam had been salvaged and sold at auction, with the Canadian Pacific Railway buying "the capstan and some of the more movable parts"; a pawnbroker bought much of the hull, with the intent of displaying it at exhibitions, but by June 1904 had abandoned it on a beach outside Oak Bay.

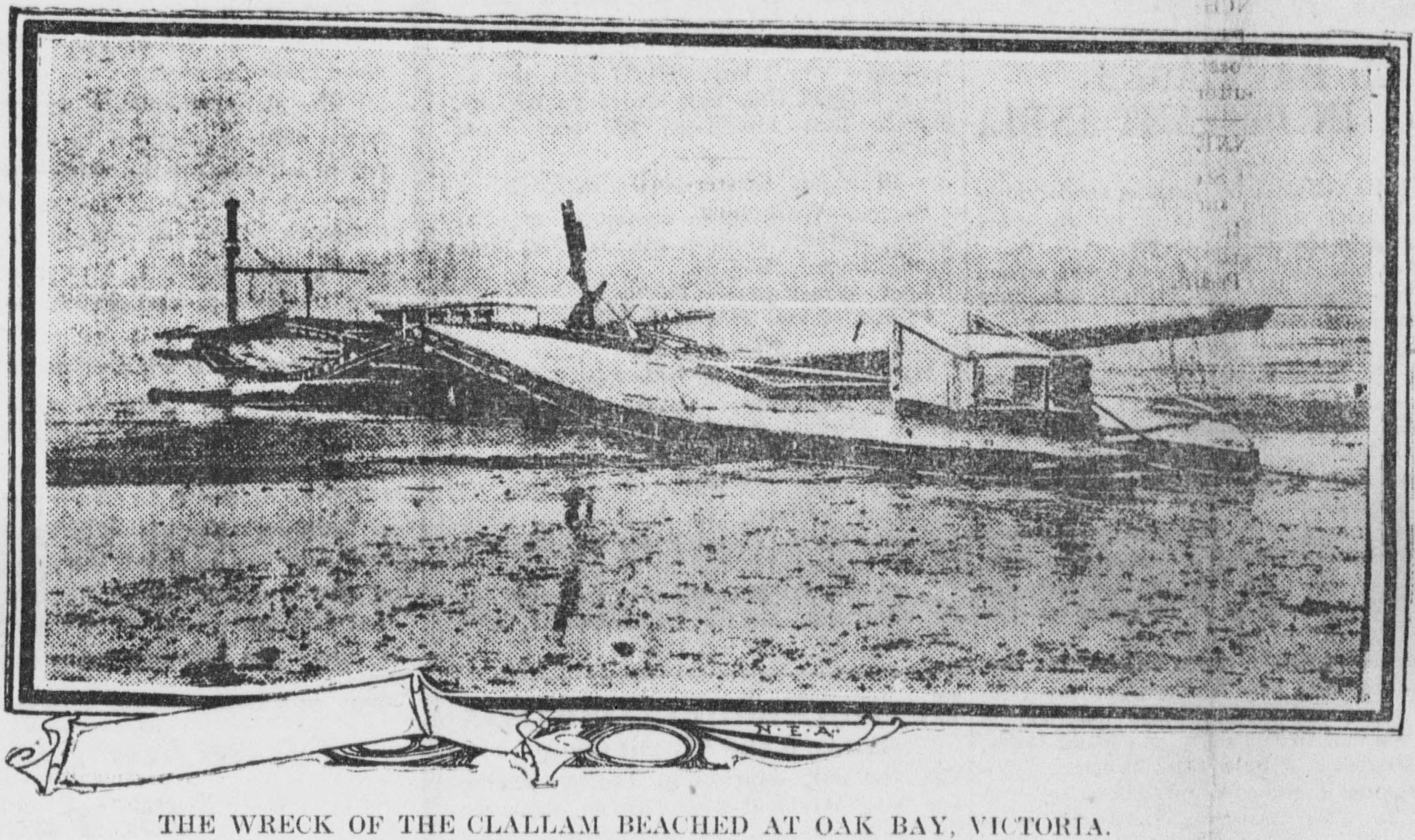
Remains of the Clallam, in June 1904

== Impact of loss ==
56 people in the boats had drowned, of whom 45 were passengers. Not one of the seventeen women and four children on the passenger list survived. There were probably more than 56 lost because several children under fare age were never accounted for. Bad as this was, things could have been much worse, as Clallam had embarked only 92 people (31 crew and 61 passengers) on her last voyage, although she was licensed to carry 250 passengers on ordinary voyages with freight, or 500 on excursions without freight.

Engineer DeLaunay's license was revoked. Captain Roberts' license was suspended. Noting the absence of legally-required signal rockets on board Clallam, the steamboat inspection service launched a crackdown on defective or insufficiently equipped vessels, of which there were many. The Clallam's route was taken over by the Alaskan Steamship Company, operating first the Dolphin and then later Majestic, which was rebuilt and renamed Whatcom. Joshua Green, then in charge of the Puget Sound Navigation Company, determined to put much more reliable ships on the inland seas, shortly thereafter purchasing the steel steamers Indianapolis, Chippewa, and Iroquois from the Great Lakes and arranging to bring them around South America through the Strait of Magellan to Puget Sound.

One other significance of the Clallam disaster may be that when the Princess Sophia went aground in October 1918, in Lynn Canal, her captain, undoubtedly familiar with the Clallam sinking, refused to put the passengers into the boats, even though rescue vessels were at hand, due to the bad sea conditions which it must have seemed to him would make evacuation of the stranded vessel a greater danger than remaining on board. This proved to be a fatal misjudgment in the Princess Sophia's case, as the sea and wind came up during the night, washed the Sophia off the rocks, and drowned all aboard.

== See also ==
- Graveyard of the Pacific
