= Joshua Green (businessman) =

American banker and businessman (1869–1975)

- Joshua Green as a young man
- Born: October 16, 1869; Jackson, Mississippi, U.S.
- Died: January 24, 1975 (aged 105); Seattle, Washington, U.S.
- Occupations: sternwheeler captain, businessman, banker

Joshua Green (October 16, 1869 – January 24, 1975) was an American sternwheeler captain, businessman, and banker. He rose from being a seaman to being the dominant figure of the Puget Sound Mosquito Fleet, then sold out his interests and became a banker. Living to the age of 105 and active in business almost to the end of his life, he became an invaluable source of information about the history of Seattle and the Puget Sound region. According to Nard Jones, Green was one of the city of Seattle's last fluent speakers of Chinook Jargon, the pidgin trade language of the Pacific Northwest.

== Early life ==
Born in Mississippi, Joshua Green relocated with his family to the Puget Sound region of Washington in 1886 when he was 17 years old. The family formed a connection with Seattle mayor Bailey Gatzert, who helped Green begin his career.

== Career ==
Green worked as a chainman, surveying for the Seattle, Lake Shore and Eastern Railway, then on the sternwheeler Henry Bailey, a Puget Sound Mosquito Fleet vessel that also went up the Skagit River. In late 1889, using a $5,000 loan from Seattle banker Jacob Furth, an associate of Gatzert's, Green and three fellow officers of the Henry Bailey purchased their own sternwheeler, the Fanny Lake (or Fannie Lake). Bill Speidel describes it as "…a funny little thing… She looked like a scow with a big box, topped by a smaller box, topped by a deluxe model outhouse."

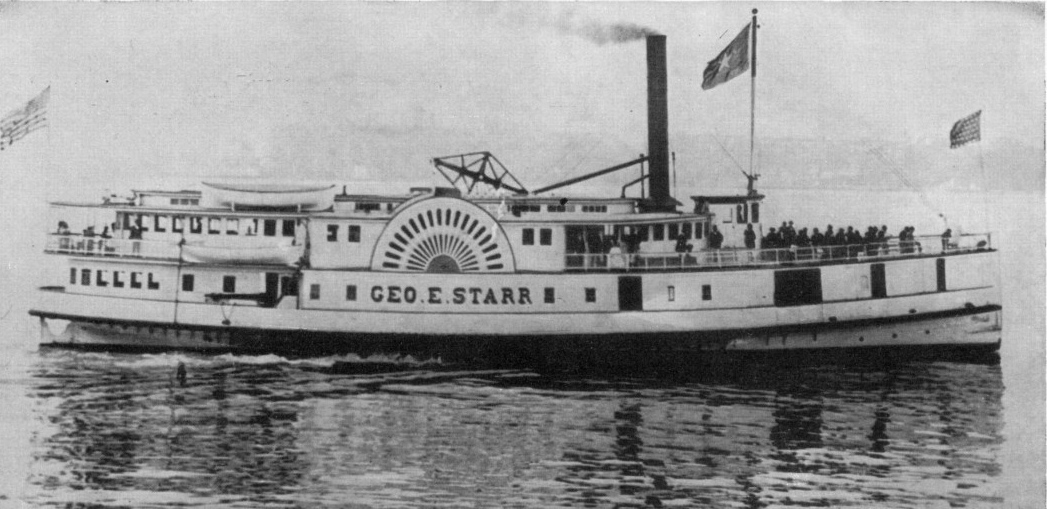
George E. Starr. According to Green, "this was a faithful little boat".

Green's innovative business practices soon allowed him to become a fleet owner, president of what was named the La Conner Trading and Transportation Company, owning some rather more elegant vessels, such as the sidewheeler George E. Starr. He established Seattle's dominance of the Mosquito Fleet, relative to Olympia or Tacoma, which Speidel considers to be a key factor in Seattle's emerging and continued dominance of the Puget Sound region. He continued to be a master and captain, serving on several of his own company's sternwheelers.

The company survived several ship fires, as well as the Depression that followed the Panic of 1893, then prospered greatly in the Klondike Gold Rush, transporting miners and their gear to Alaska. Green continued to invest his profits. In 1903 he merged his firm with Charles E. Peabody's Alaska Steamship/Puget Sound Navigation Company, which soon brought the Mosquito Fleet to a new level. Ships were retrofitted to be able to carry automobiles, notably for the Seattle-Bremerton route. From 1913, the company was known as the Puget Sound Navigation Company.

In 1925, Green purchased the distressed Peoples Savings Bank for US$200,000, and in 1927, believing that the rise of the automobile limited the future of Puget Sound area water transport, he resigned from the Puget Sound Navigation Company to dedicate himself fully to banking. Puget Sound Navigation would continue to dominate Puget Sound transportation until it was bought out in 1951 by the state of Washington, as the centerpiece of Washington State Ferries.

He changed the name of the bank to Peoples Bank and Trust Co, later People's National Bank of Washington. With branch banking not allowed at the time, he began or acquired several other banks as wholly owned subsidiaries. In 1949, when he passed the presidency of the bank to his son Joshua Jr., deposits stood at $128 million. By 1969, when Joshua Green turned 100, deposits had reached $400 million. In 1988, the bank was purchased by U.S. Bancorp and renamed U.S. Bank of Washington.

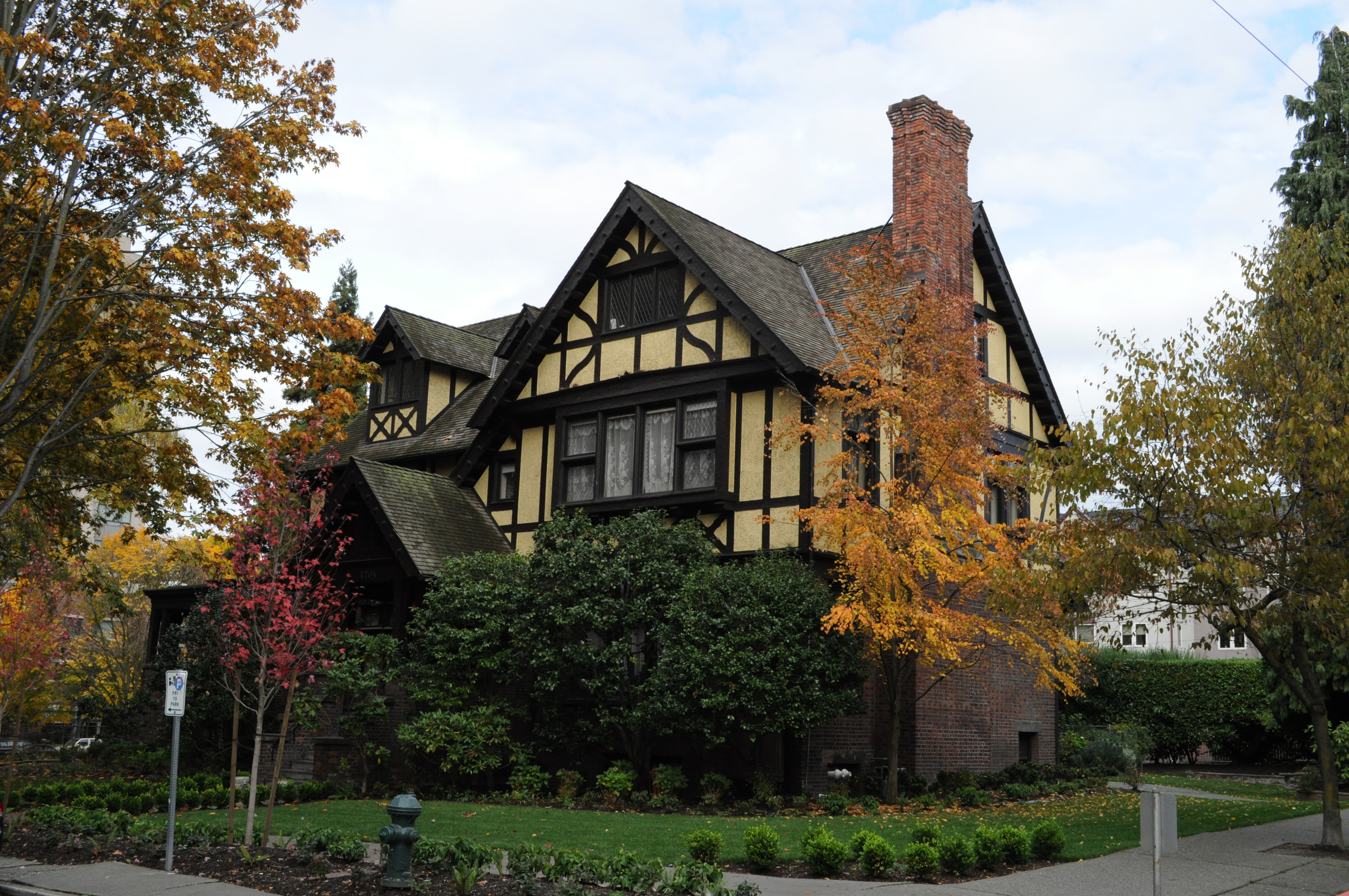
The Stimson-Green Mansion, Green's home from 1915 until his death.

== Personal life and death ==
On April 24, 1901, Joshua Green married Laura Moore Turner, from Winona, Mississippi. They had three children, Bentonia, Francis, and Joshua, Jr.

Joshua Green died at age 105 in Seattle in 1975. His wife died at age 101, predeceasing him by three weeks.

== Legacy and honors ==
In 1968 Seattle named Green its "man of the century." Joshua Green River and Joshua Green Peak, both in Alaska, are named after him.

In 1966 the Joshua Green Fountain, by renowned sculptor George Tsutakawa, was installed at the entry to Washington State Ferries' facility on the Seattle waterfront.

Green's residence (beginning in 1914, has become the Stimson-Green Mansion. It is listed on the National Register of Historic Places and has city landmark status. Green made few alterations to the 1901 house, and lived there until his death, making it one of the few First Hill mansions to survive largely intact to the present time. The house is now owned by the Washington Trust for Historic Preservation and is also used to host events.

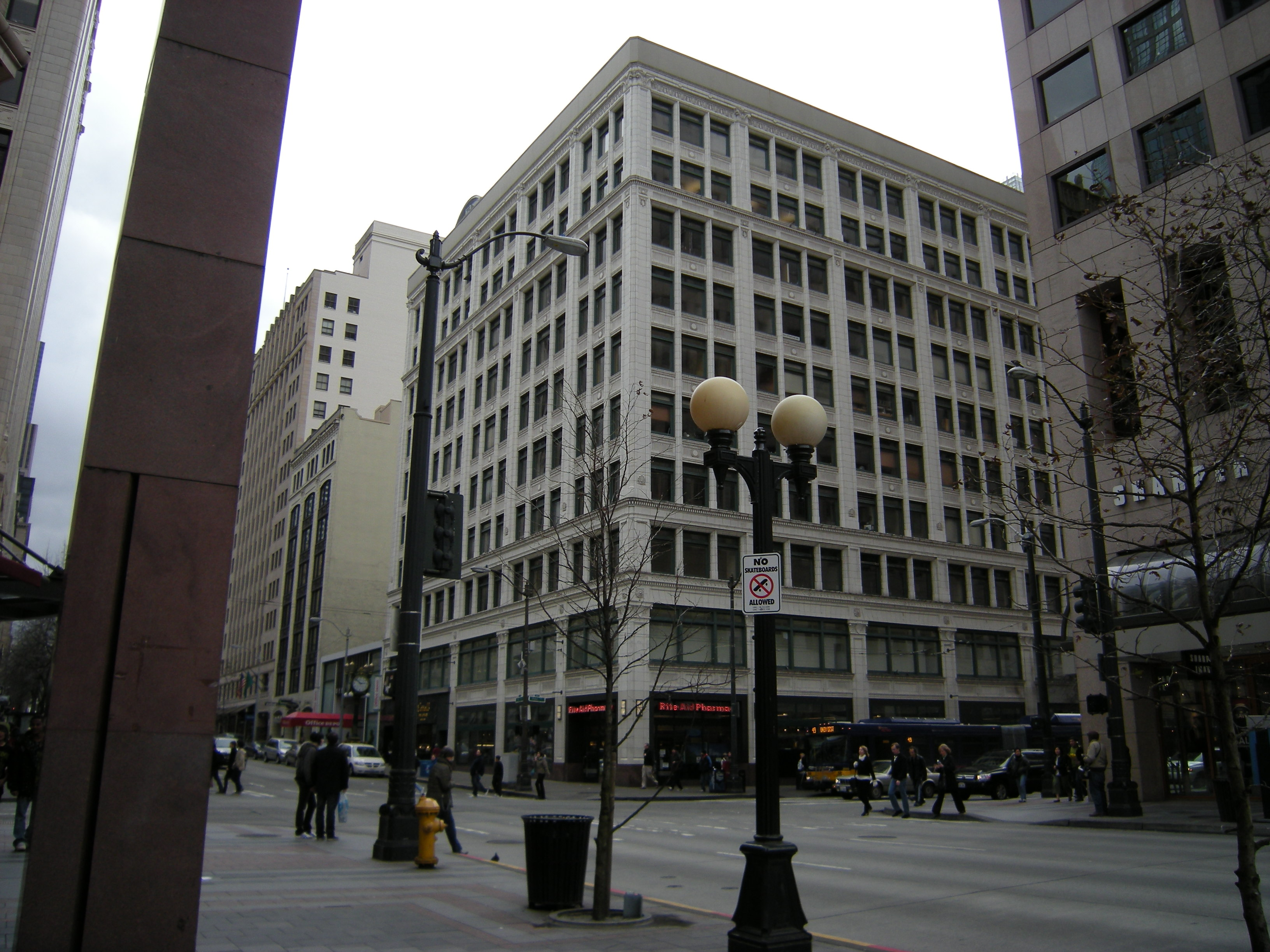
Joshua Green Building

The Joshua Green Building, 1425 Fourth Avenue, Seattle, has city landmark status. Still owned and managed by the Joshua Green Corporation, the 1914 building underwent major renovations in 2008–2009.

The Joshua Green Foundation is focused on major capital campaigns of 501 (c)(3) non-profit organizations headquartered and operating in the Seattle/King County area, primarily private secondary and higher education, social services and the arts.

His family continues his business interests as the Joshua Green Corporation / Green Family Enterprises, operating numerous retail properties in the region and in Spokane, Washington, as well as investing in "banking and insurance," and "diversified portfolios of managed equities." Reflecting Green's interests as a sportsman, they also own several manufacturers of fly fishing equipment.
