= General Miles =

Steamship

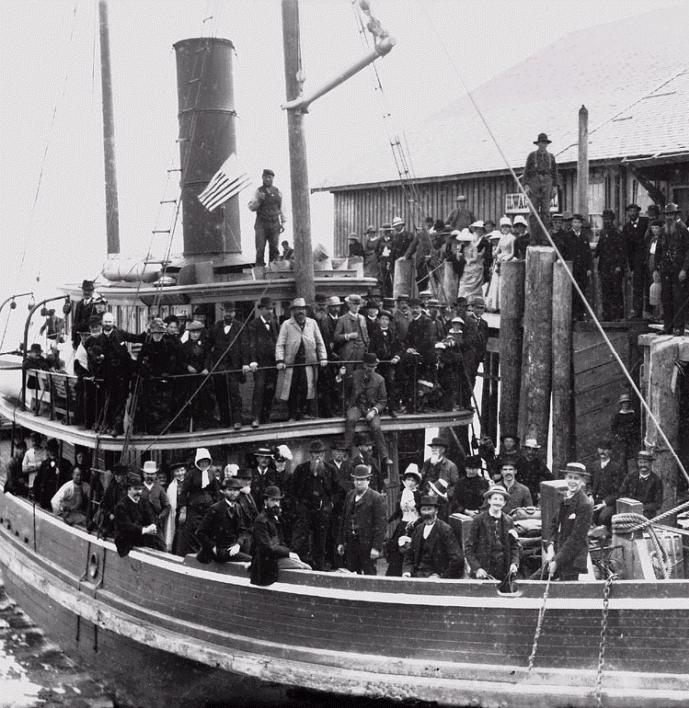
- General Miles at dock in Ilwaco, some time between 1882 and 1889.

History
- Name: General Miles, later Willapa, Bellingham, and Norco
- Owner: Ilwaco Rwy & Nav. Co.; Portland Coast & Steamship Co.; Island Trans. Co.; Alaska Steamship Co.; Canadian-Pacific Nav. Co.; Bellingham Bay Trans. Co.; Inland Nav. Co.; Thompson Steamship Co.; Puget Sound Nav. Co.; Straits Steamship Co.; Northland Trans. Co.
- Route: Columbia River, Grays Harbor, Coos Bay, Tillamook Bay, San Juan Islands, Puget Sound, Vancouver Island, Inside Passage, Strait of Juan de Fuca.
- Launched: June 15, 1882
- In service: 1882
- Out of service: 1950
- Identification: General Miles: US registry #85370; Bellingham: #81313, flag signal letters KDJN.
- Fate: Scrapped and deliberately burned

General characteristics
- Type: Coastal vessel
- Tonnage: as built: gross: 127; 1st rebuild: 333 gross, 249 regist.
- Length: As built: 100 ft (30.48 m); rebuilt: 136 ft (41.45 m), later 140 ft (42.67 m)
- Beam: 22 ft (6.71 m)
- Depth: 10.5 ft (3.20 m) depth of hold
- Decks: two (2)
- Installed power: steam engine; as of 1891 reported as compound, cylinder bores (high pressure) 16 in (40.6 cm) and (low pressure) 32 in (81.3 cm); stroke 32 in (81.3 cm); Unpowered from 1919 to 1922, when a 200 horsepower (150 kW) Fairbanks-Morse semi-diesel engine was installed.
- Propulsion: propeller
- Sail plan: Schooner, 1879-1882; sailing barge (unknown rig) 1919-1922.
- Capacity: As built: 125 passengers; 150 tons freight.

General Miles was a steamship constructed in 1882 which served in various coastal areas of the states of Oregon and Washington, as well as British Columbia and the territory of Alaska. It was apparently named after US General Nelson A. Miles.

Originally a sailing schooner built in 1879, the General Miles was extensively reconstructed in 1890 and renamed Willapa. In 1903 the name was changed again to Bellingham. After a conversion to diesel power in 1922, the vessel was renamed Norco. The vessel is notable for, among other things, for having been first a sailing vessel from 1879 to 1882, a steamship from 1882 to 1918, a sailing barge from 1919 to 1922, and a motor vessel (diesel-powered) from 1922 to 1950.

== Construction ==
General Miles was built in 1882 for the Ilwaco Steam Navigation Company. The vessel was a rebuilt sailing schooner which had been originally built in 1879.

The ISN had been organized in 1875 by Lewis A. Loomis, Jacob Kamm and two others, for the purpose of developing transportation to, from, and on the Long Beach Peninsula, located on the north side of the mouth of the Columbia River.

The company's first vessel was the General Canby, a 110 ft (33.53 m) steam tug built in 1875 at South Bend, Washington. ISN organized steamboat routes both on Willapa Bay, on the east side of the Long Beach Peninsula, and also on the Columbia River, on the south side of the peninsula.

By the early 1880s, demand on the Columbia river route, which ran from Astoria, Oregon to Ilwaco, Washington, was increasing beyond the General Canby's legal passenger capacity, which was 75 in summer and 40 in winter.

For this reason, ISN had a new steamer, the General Miles, constructed in Portland, Oregon. Completed in 1882, General Miles was a near sister ship to the General Canby. The General Miles was capable of multiple uses, being equipped with towing bits for tugboat work as well as being designed to accommodate 125 passengers and handle 150 tons of freight.

== Early career ==
The company placed the General Miles in service right away running with the General Canby, so that two trips a day could be made between Astoria and Illwaco. This improved steamship service helped popularize the Long Beach Peninsula as a destination resort area for Portland, Oregon, which was then growing rapidly in population. ISN also employed the General Miles on occasional trips to Tillamook and Coos Bay, Oregon.

The first commander of General Miles was W.P. Whitcomb (b. 1848), who had previously been in charge of the General Canby. His brother, George H. Whitcomb (b. 1854), also served on the General Miles.

Capt. John Henry D. Gray (b. 1839), who was the grandson of explorer Robert Gray, was one of the masters of General Miller at this time, as well as being a part owner. Gray used General Miles in the development of the Grays Harbor area. Gray was in command of General Miles at the salvage of the then almost new steamer Queen of the Pacific (330 ft (100.58 m)) in 1883 when that vessel grounded on the Clatsop Spit. Queen of the Pacific was stranded while trying to cross the Columbia Bar on September 5, 1883. Five tugs were called out, including General Miles, Pioneer, Brenham, Astoria, and Columbia, and with great effort they were able to save the ship. ISN kept the General Miles on the Astoria-Ilwaco route until 1889, when the vessel was sold to Portland Coast and Steamship Company and transferred to Coos Bay to operate as a tug.

== Reconstruction as Willapa ==
Capt. Herbert F. Beecher (b. 1853) purchased General Miles. Beecher, doing business as the Island Transportation Company, renamed the vessel Willapa, and ran it on Puget Sound Beecher left the business however after his steamer J.H. Libby burned on November 10, 1889. It is reported that Willapa took the place of J.H. Libby for a time, carrying passengers and freight between Port Townsend and the San Juan Islands.

Willapa was returned to Portland in 1890, where, in work completed in 1891, the vessel underwent a substantial reconstruction. The hull was cut in two, and an additional section 36 ft (10.97 m) was inserted in the middle, with the resulting hull being 136 ft (41.45 m) long.

In 1894, Willapa was leased by the Hastings Steamboat Company.

== Alaska service ==
Willapa at Juneau, Alaska, March 1897

On January 21, 1895, the Alaska Steamship Company was organized by a group of Seattle business and steamboatmen. At that time, the Alaska trade was dominated by the Pacific Coast Steamship Company. The first vessel purchased by Alaska Steam was the Willapa, which, following an extensive overhaul and refitting, departed on her first Alaska trip from the Schwabacher Brothers wharf on March 3, 1895, returning two weeks later on March 17. Willapa carried 79 passengers, 23 horses, and several hundred tons of cargo. A rate war then ensued with the Pacific Coast company, forcing Pacific Coast to cut its rates by more than 50%.

== British Columbia service ==
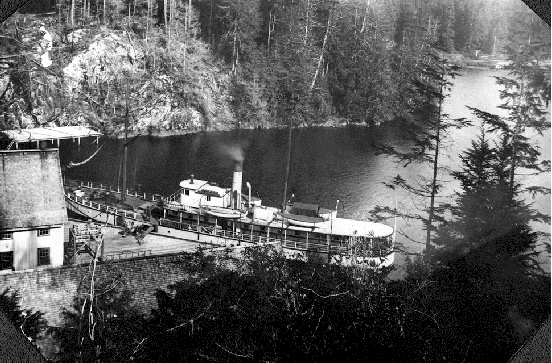
Willapa in Canadian service, at Clayoquot cannery, on the west coast of Vancouver Island, some time between 1897 and 1902.

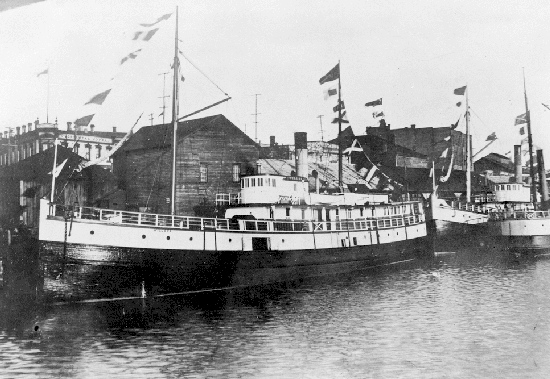
Willapa in Victoria, likely between 1897 and 1902.

On March 19, 1897, at 2:30 a.m., bound for Mary Island, Alaska, Willapa was proceeding in a heavy snow storm in Seaforth Channel, a part of the Inside Passage, when the vessel struck ground on Regatta Reef. The passengers were removed without casualty by a schooner and local canoes manned by First Nations people. Much freight was also salvaged, but several head of horses could not be rescued and were therefore shot. Although originally considered a total loss, later Willapa was purchased from the underwriters by Canadian interests, removed from the reef, and repaired.

Subsequently, Willapa came into the control of the Canadian-Pacific Navigation Company, one of the dominant shipping companies on the coast of British Columbia and in the Alaskan Panhandle. This company used Willapa as a relief boat on various routes, including the service to including Clayoquot on the west coast of Vancouver Island.

== Return to American ownership ==
In November 1902, Capt. C.E. Curtis in association with the Bellingham Bay Transportation Company, acquired Willapa from the Canadian-Pacific Navigation Company, and renamed the ship Bellingham. During 1903, the rapidly growing Puget Sound Navigation Co. acquired Bellingham Transportation Company, but Dode and Willapa did not go to PSN operational control until the spring of 1904.

It is also reported that Canadian-Pacific sold Willapa to the Thompson Steamship Company before the vessel came into the ownership of Puget Sound Navigation Co. Thompson Steamship was a Port Angeles concern run by the Thompson brothers, including John Rex Thompson. John Rex Thompson was a business ally of C.E. Curtis. A news report from late 1902 stated that Willapa was to be purchased by a syndicate headed by John Rex Thompson. In May 1904, allegations were made in court of financial malfeasance and breach of trust by C.E. Curtis, causing Bellingham Bay Transportation Co., a company owned by local farmers, to become financially insolvent.

== Puget Sound service as Bellingham ==
On return to Puget Sound, Bellingham was placed on the Seattle – Bellingham route, which included through service by local steamer from Bellingham to Blaine and Point Roberts. Running against Bellingham were the Utopia and the old sidewheeler George E. Starr, both owned by the Puget Sound Navigation Company.

On December 6, 1903, in heavy fog, Bellingham was towing the steamer Dode to Whatcom for repairs, the vessels still being run by the Bellingham Bay company. The fast steamer Flyer pulled away from the Seattle dock en route to Tacoma and five minutes later Bellingham collided with Flyer. Dode, under tow and unable to manoeuvre, also collided with Flyer. Flyer was badly, but not irreparably damaged. Bellingham sustained only light damage. No one on any vessel was injured. Shortly after this incident Bellingham was transferred to the control of the Inland Navigation Company, which was owned by businessman Charles E. Peabody and associates. For a short time after this acquisition, Bellingham was placed on the Seattle – Port Townsend route, running under Capt. Howard Penfield, a cousin of Charles Peabody. The vessel was then placed on a route between the Washington ports along the Strait of Juan de Fuca, including Port Angeles. Clallam Bay, and, later, Neah Bay. Bellingham replaced the Alice Gertrude when that vessel sank after striking a rock in Clallam Bay on January 11, 1907. At this time Capt. Charles E Kastrom (d.1917) took over command of Bellingham and remained her principal captain until his unexpected death in 1917 following a heart attack while at the helm of the steamer Waialeale

When, in 1903, the Puget Sound Navigation Company purchased Thompson Steamship Co., Bellingham became the flagship of the PSN fleet. This ship, when rebuilt and in service as Bellingham in the early 1900s, was reported to have a "ghost whistle" which was described as a low moaning sound heard when the vessel was working through a heavy sea.

In 1908, Joshua Green, president of the Puget Sound Navigation Company, explored the possibility of returning Bellingham to Canadian service to run against the Canadian Pacific's steamships that were operating on the profitable Vancouver – Victoria route. For a long time, it had been the law in Canada that a former Canadian vessel could be returned to Canadian service without having to pay a customs duty, and as a former Canadian vessel, Bellingham would qualify. However, nothing came of this plan when it was determined that the Canadian law had changed, and a duty of 25% of the vessel's value would be imposed if Bellingham were to be returned to Canadian service.

In 1909 Bellingham's principal owner was listed as the Straits Steamship Company.

== Conversion to sailing barge ==
By 1918, the boilers on Bellingham were considered too worn out for the vessel to be of any further service as a powered ship. The fittings and machinery were therefore removed and scrapped by the firm of Neider & Marcus. In March 1919 Bellingham was sold to H.C. Strong who was doing business as the Sunny Point Packing Company. The powerless vessel was taken to the King and Winge shipyard in West Seattle which converted the ship into an unpowered sailing barge which still retained the name Bellingham. A donkey engine with steam driven by a vertical boiler was installed, which powered two cargo hoists. The vessel was also rigged with auxiliary sails, although these appear to not have been used very much.

== Conversion to motor vessel ==
In 1922 Bellingham's owners determined that the vessel could be put to better uses. The vessel was taken to the Lake Union Drydock and Machine Works in Seattle where a 200 horsepower (150 kW) Fairbanks-Morse semi-diesel engine was installed. The upper works were also extensively reconfigured and the vessel was again equipped to run from Seattle to Ketchikan and other ports of the Inside Passage. In this service the vessel was operated under the name Norco by the Northland Transportation Company. In the late 1920s the vessel was briefly owned by a Ketchikan concern known as Citizen's Light and Power Company, which was a part of the public utility empire assembled by businessman Wilbur B. Foshay (1881-1957).

== Destruction at Seafair ==
From 1941 to 1946 the vessel was owned by Ketchikan Cold Storage, and then was purchased by Otis Shively. The vessel then was presented to the Puget Sound Maritime Historical Society to be used in the annual Seafair celebration in Seattle, to be burned in a public ceremony in the summer of 1950 as "Neptune's" barge. The vessel was loaded up with fireworks and other inflammable materials, and towed into Elliott Bay by the tug Goliah and set on fire. Although the vessel burned for hours, it proved difficult to sink. Only when the fireboat Duwamish filled up the vessel with water at high-pressure did the hull finally go under the water during night, off Alki Point.
