= Eglon, Washington =

Unincorporated community in Washington, United States

- Unincorporated community
- Location in Washington and the United States Eglon (the United States)
- Coordinates: 47°52′7″N 122°31′10″W
- Country: United States
- State: Washington
- County: Kitsap
- Time zone: UTC-8 (Pacific (PST))
  - Summer (DST): UTC-7 (PDT)
- GNIS feature ID: 1512182

Eglon is an unincorporated community in Kitsap County, Washington, United States. The town has a community center, a church, a cemetery, a boat launch, a beach, and a picnic area. Its Fire Protection services are provided by North Kitsap Fire and Rescue.

== History ==
The earliest land deeds in this area were government grants to homesteaders, the first of which was recorded December 1, 1864 for 160 acres to settler Isidro Martyn, for having served in the US Army during the American Civil War. In 1891, another homesteader, Charles R. Silver, was granted 160 acres along the waterfront where a stream ran into Puget Sound, and named it Silver Creek. The surrounding area and its community soon became known as Silver Creek. Silver only held this land until 1894, when it was foreclosed on, and it was purchased by Edward Scannel, the lighthouse keeper at Point-No-Point. At this time, few landowners are believed to have lived in the area year round. Rather, they came to log and fish on their land, and lived in more established communities nearby, such as Kingston, Edmonds, and Seattle.

First Eglon dock, c. 1914

In 1904, Albert Halvorsen, a Norwegian immigrant, purchased over a mile of waterfront from Scannel, including the former Silver property. He brought many of his relatives from Seattle to live on his land, and these settlers represented the first permanent residents of Silver Creek. Settlers had to row to either Edmonds or Point-No-Point for mail and supplies, and so in 1906, with the population beginning to grow, Halvorsen established a general store near the beach, and applied for a post office. Postal officials rejected the name Silver Creek, due to a Silver Creek, Washington already in existence, and so the name Eglon was chosen by the community, after Eglon, a figure in the Hebrew Bible. The post office opened October 8, 1906, with Halvorsen's wife Marie Halvorsen as the first postmistress.

Eglon first schoolhouse

Eglon Community Church

The Eglon school district was formed in 1907, for the nine school-aged children living in Eglon, with classes beginning on Jan 8, 1908. The first schoolhouse was built in 1908.

Industry increased in Eglon over the next decade. Cook's Camp, a logging operation was established in 1906 at Sandy Beach, south of Eglon Beach, followed by a sawmill in 1908, and a fish trap in 1916, built between Eglon Beach and Pilot Point. In 1912, a one-way wagon road to Kingston was constructed, providing the first road connection to the rest of the county. A community dock was constructed in 1913, but it was of poor quality, and had to be replaced in 1918. On November 18, 1918, regular ferry service was established by the Puget Sound Navigation Company to Colman Dock in Seattle, on the Mosquito Fleet steamer Puget. In 1919, the Port of Eglon was established, and the dock was sold to the Port for $1. Passengers, freight, mail, daily Seattle newspapers, and produce from the Public Market in Seattle, all came by boat. Other steamers that regularly frequented Eglon were: Dode, Perdita, "Weary Willy", Monticello, Dauntless, and Virginia III.

Between 1918 and 1920, the Eglon Community Church was built, and still stands and holds services today. Many early church services were held in Norwegian or Swedish. In 1921, Camp Cohoe, a girls summer camp was founded. A larger Eglon schoolhouse was built in 1922, and today, is used as a community center.

Logging in the area was increased in the 1920s by the arrival of Puget Mill Company in 1922, which first logged along Hansville Road, hauling logs by train to Gamble Bay, south of Little Boston, where they were then floated to the Port Gamble mill. In 1926, Puget Mill began logging closer to Eglon Beach, where they were floated from a logging dock built north of Eglon Beach. In the summer of 1929, a large forest fire burned much of the logged Puget Mill land. Firefighters were brought in from nearby towns to protect the Eglon dock, and with the help of a favorable wind, they were successful.

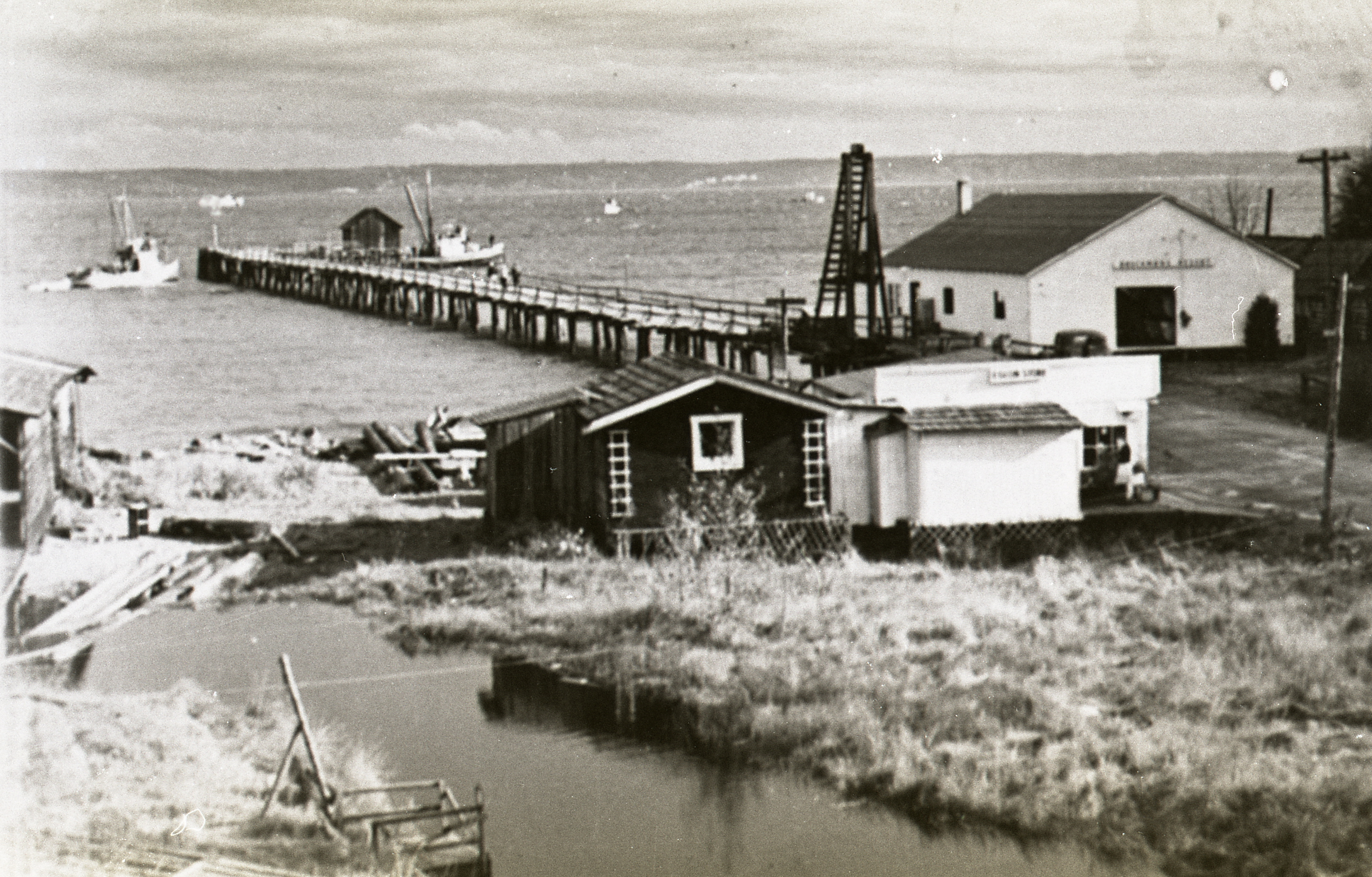
Eglon community dock, store, and post office, c. 1950

In 1921, construction began on Hansville Road, which would provide an automobile connection to Eglon for the first time. The first car owners in Eglon would use the old wagon road, but often with the help of horses, and sometimes had to scale the many steep hills in reverse. Hansville Road was opened in sections and was finally complete in 1924, and Highway 104 opened in 1926, providing the final link to Kingston and its ferry connection to Edmonds. However, it was not until improvements were made in 1942 that the road was in good enough condition to be used year-round.

The first telephone connection to Eglon was completed in December 1926, and the first electricity service in 1929.

With the opening of the new road, by 1933, the Mosquito Fleet route to Eglon was so unprofitable that it was discontinued. For a year, Eglon was a flag stop for the passenger steamer Mohawk, passing three times a week, but was discontinued for lack of patronage in 1934. The Eglon post office was closed in 1964.
