= Eglon =

Eglon may refer to:

- Eglon, Canaan, a biblical city
- Eglon (king), a biblical king
- Eglon, West Virginia, a community in the U.S. state of West Virginia
- Eglon, Washington, a community in the U.S. state of Washington on the Kitsap Peninsula
