= Northland Transportation Company =

Passengers and Shipping Company

- Company type: Shareholder
- Industry: Transportation and Shipping
- Founded: September 23, 1923
- Defunct: 1948
- Successor: Skinner and Eddy Corporation in 1942
- Headquarters: Seattle, Washington and Ketchikan, Alaska, United States
- Key people: Joseph C Black; Ofell Hjalmer; Donald Cornue
- Services: cargo ships and passenger ships

Northland Transportation Company operated cargo and passenger ships from Seattle to Southeast Alaska starting in 1923. During World War II Northland Transportation Company was active in charter shipping with the Maritime Commission and War Shipping Administration. Northland Transportation Company, proposed a loan from United States Shipping Board to build a ship for Puget Sound-Alaska trade in 1933. In 1934, the company was granted a $350,000 loan to build a new ship. The 1,400 tons passenger ship, was built at Lake Washington Shipyard in Houghton, Washington. Northland Transportation Company Seattle dock and warehouse were at Pier 56 (originally called Pier 5), now Ainsworth and Dunn Wharf.

Alaska ports served: Ketchikan, Wrangell, Petersburg, Juneau, Haines, Skagway and Sitka. There was also some service to Quinhagak, Alaska and Kuskokwim Bay starting in 1944. Northland Transportation Company opened a terminal at pier 42 in South Seattle.

Skinner and Eddy Corporation of Washington purchased the only two major Alaska shipping companies to survive the after the war: Northland Transportation Company in 1942 and Alaska Steamship Company in 1944. The other Alaska Steamship Companies did not survive due to rising labor costs, the end of federal subsidies and from new competition from trucking and air carriers. At the time of purchase, Northland Transportation Company had six ships. Skinner and Eddy Corporation closed the Northland Transportation Company in 1948.

== Northland Transportation ships ==
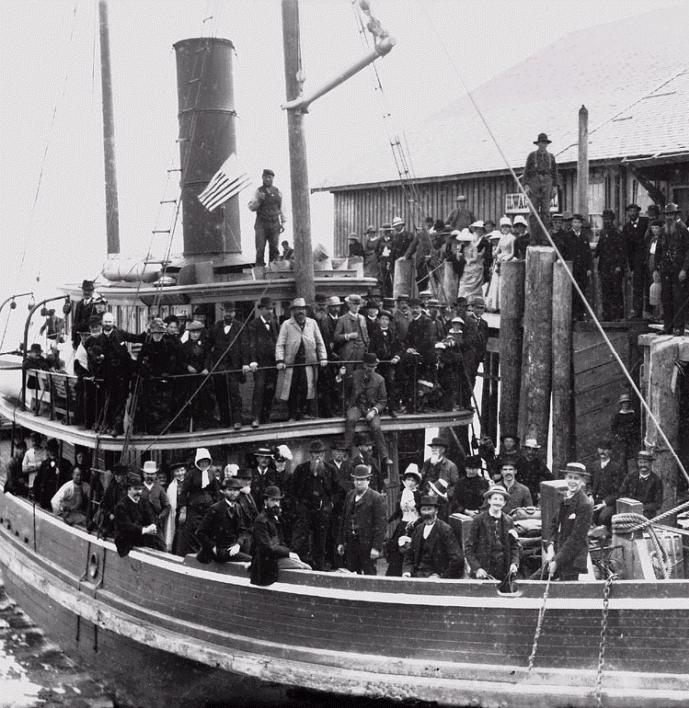
SS Norco, was General Miles

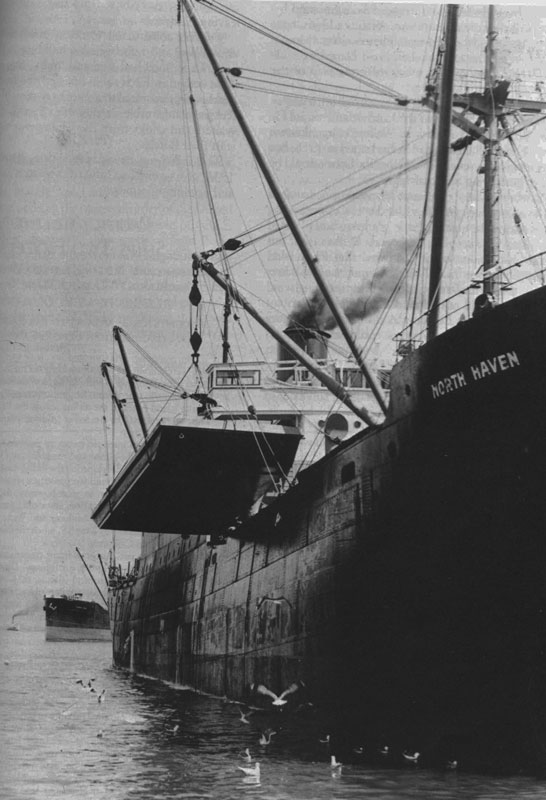
North Haven, used by US Navy here loading in San Francisco

Northland Transportation ships:

- Northland, a 1,262 ton passenger steamer built in 1929 at Lake Washington Shipyard as the W. B. Foshhay. Sold in 1947 and on November 1, 1955, sank as the Titika wrecked on rocks south of Fiskiðjuna, off Keflavik, Iceland.
- North Sea was the Mary Weems, built in 1918, sold in 1934 to Northland Transportation Company, She met her demise when she was stranded on the coast of British Columbia in 1947. Built in 1918 at 3,133 tons by Bethlehem Shipbuilding Corp. On August 10, 1936 the Northsea struck a submerged object off Taku Point on the receding tide, she was refloated. She was taken Todd Shipyard into dry dock and repaired. On February 13, 1947, on a voyage from Ketchikan to Seattle sank on Porter Reef, Shearwater, British Columbia, in Seaforth Channel.
- SS North Wind a 2,448 ton passenger steamer, was stranded and was lost December 14, 1944 near Simeonof Island under used by the US Army. Built in 1918 by the New York Shipbuilding Company. Was SS Mincola with the Atlantic Transport Company and Grace Line. The SS Nosa Duke with the American Steamship Company. In 1932 she became the North Wind of the Northland Transportation Company
- North Haven used by US Navy in World War 2. 6,700-ton cargo ship. Northland Transportation Company used the ship to take cannery workers to Alaska. The lower deck a dormitory and it had large refrigerators. She was used by the Navy to move six months’ worth of food to Midway and Wake Island. She also took supplies and Seabees to Manila and Guam.
- SS Norco, built in 1882 was General Miles. Built as a sailing ship and converted to power.
- North Coast was SS Mayon was built as the Carabobo in 1923 by the New York Shipbuilding in Camden, New Jersey, for the Atlantic and Caribbean Shipping and Navigation of Delaware. In 1938, she was sold to the Northland Transportation Company in 1938 by the Grace Line. Used by US Army in World War II. Sold off in 1947, and on February 18, 1955, an explosion and fire hit the ship off the western coast of Borneo Island.
- SS Chief Washakie war surplus was purchased in 1947, a 1942 Liberty ship type EC-S-C1 built in Portland, Oregon in 1942. Sold off with the other ships when the company closed in 1948. (Ship was later scrapped in 1971).

== World War II Merchant Marine ==
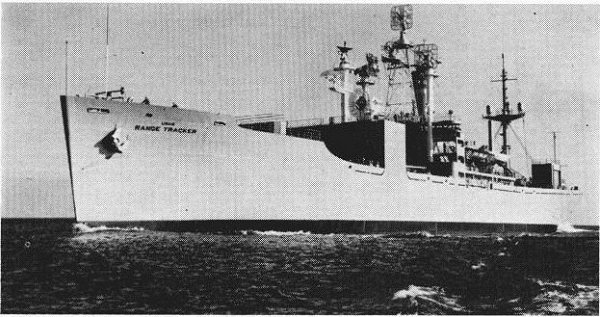
SS Skidmore Victory, later became USNS Range Tracker

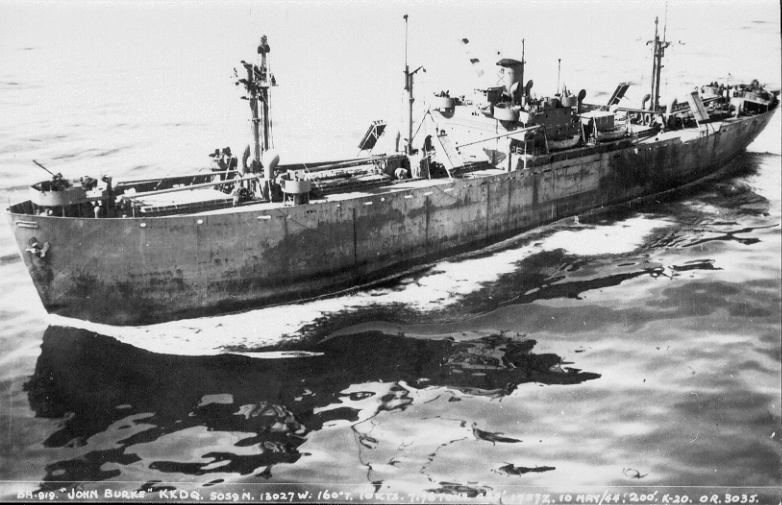
SS John Burke

Ships operated by Northland Transportation Company for World War II under the United States Merchant Marine. The ships were owned by the War Shipping Administration and operated by Northland Transportation Company.

The ship was run by its Northland Transportation Company crew and the US Navy supplied United States Navy Armed Guards to man the deck guns and radio. The most common armament mounted on these merchant ships were the MK II 20mm Oerlikon autocannon and the 3"/50, 4"/50, and 5"/38 deck guns.

  - Victory ships, 7,200 tons:
- SS Skidmore Victory later became the USNS Range Tracker.
- Macalester Victory
- Midland Victory
- Adrian Victory
- SS Furman Victory, later became the USNS Furman (T-AK-280).
- Northwestern Victory
- Dothan Victory
  - Liberty Ships, 10,856 tons:
- Chief Washakie, Northland Transportation purshased in 1948, built in Portland, Oregon, in 1942. Named after Chief Washakie
- John Burke, Ammunition Ship built at Kaiser Shipbuilding Company's Oregon Shipbuilding yard in Portland, Oregon in 1942. Sank in a blast after kamikaze attack on December 28, 1944, off Negros island, and Siquijor island, all aboard her were lost.
- Henderson Luelling, named after Henderson Luelling
- John W.Weeks, Troop Ship, named after John W. Weeks
- William H. Ashley, named after William H. Ashley
- Henderson Luelling, named after Henderson Luelling
- Charlotte Cushman, named after Charlotte Cushman, built by Permanente Metals Corporation in Richmond, California in 1944, shot down five enemy planes off Leyte.
- John P. Gaines November 24, 1943 she broke in two and sank with the loss of 10 lives off the Aleutian Islands.
- Floyd W. Spencer, built in 1944 at Delta Shipbuilding, New Orleans,

== See also ==
- Category:Ships built by Skinner & Eddy
- Alaska Highway built in 1942, new competition for Northland Transportation Company
- Canadian Pacific Steamship Company
