= USNS Range Tracker =

U.S. Naval Vessel

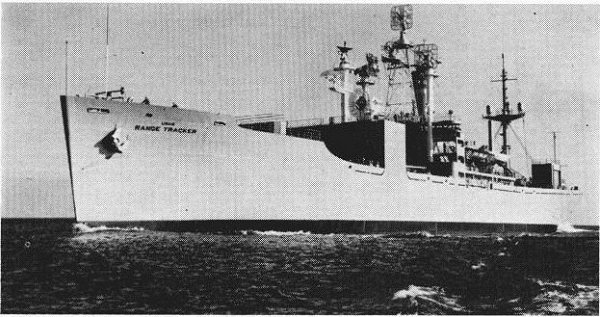
- USNS Range Tracker (T-AGM-1)

History

United States
- Name: Skidmore Victory; Range Tracker
- Namesake: Skidmore College; A ship or shore-based radar system which follows the progress of missiles, space vehicles, and satellites
- Builder: Oregon Shipbuilding Corporation, Portland, Oregon
- Laid down: 6 April 1945, as Skidmore Victory, type (VC2-S-AP3) hull, MCV hull 685
- Sponsored by: Mrs. Harry C. Bates
- Acquired: by the U.S. Air Force in the late 1950s
- In service: 12 July 1960 as USNS Ranger Tracker (T-AG-160)
- Out of service: 27 September 1969, at Port Hueneme, California
- Reclassified: T-AGM-1, 27 November 1960
- Refit: Ingalls Shipbuilding Corporation, Pascagoula, Mississippi, (modified as a tracking ship)
- Stricken: 28 April 1970
- Homeport: Port Hueneme, California
- Fate: Sold for scrapping, 10 July 1970

General characteristics
- Type: Range Tracker-class missile range instrumentation ship
- Displacement: 4,512 tons light; 11,500 tons full load
- Length: 455 ft 3 in (138.76 m)
- Beam: 62 ft 2 in (18.95 m)
- Draft: 28 ft 6 in (8.69 m)
- Propulsion: cross compound steam turbine, single screw, 8,500shp
- Speed: 15.5 knots
- Complement: 56 personnel
- Armament: none

USNS Range Tracker (T-AGM-1/T-AG-160) was an Air Force Systems Command Range Tracker-class missile range instrumentation ship. She was acquired from the National Defense Reserve Fleet in the 1950s and converted into a missile range tracking ship with a civilian crew. She performed tracking duties from 1961 through 1969 on the Western Launch and Test Range.

== Built in Portland, Oregon ==
The SS Skidmore Victory (VC2-S-AP3) was laid down 6 April 1945 by Oregon Shipbuilding Corporation as a Victory ship (VC2). She was named for Skidmore College, a liberal arts college in Saratoga Springs, New York. She was launched 19 May 1945 and sponsored by Mrs. Harry C. Bates. Skidmore Victory (MCV hull 685) was delivered to Northland Transportation Company on 18 June 1945.

Victory ships were a class of cargo ship produced in large numbers by American shipyards during World War II to replace losses caused by German submarines. They were slightly larger, more modern design when compared to the earlier Liberty ships, with a more powerful steam turbine engine allowing them to join high speed convoys and to make a more difficult target for German U-boats.

She later served American President Lines as President Buchanan.

== Placed into service as a tracking ship ==
She was taken out of the National Defense Reserve Fleet in the late 1950s and converted by Ingalls Shipbuilding Corporation, Pascagoula, Mississippi, into a complex electronics center; named Range Tracker and designated AG-160 on 12 July 1960; reclassified AGM-1 on 27 November 1960; and placed in service in May 1961.

A mobile tracking platform for recording data on missiles and satellites that are out of range of established land stations, Range Tracker was homeported at Port Hueneme, California, on the Pacific Missile Range from June 1961 to 1969.

She was operated by the Military Sea Transportation Service with a civilian crew.

== Tracking astronauts ==
USNS Range Tracker's inertial navigation system monitored astronaut Gordon Cooper's 22-orbit space flight during July 1963.

== Out of service ==
In 1969, when the Air Force Systems Command no longer needed Range Tracker, she was placed out of service at Port Hueneme 27 September 1969; transferred to the U.S. Maritime Administration 12 November 1969; and laid up at Suisun Bay. On 10 July 1970, she was sold to American Ship Dismantlers, Inc., for scrapping.

== See also ==
- Western Launch and Test Range
- List of ships of the United States Air Force
- List of Victory ships
- Liberty ship
