= Torchlight Parade =

Event in Seattle, Washington, US

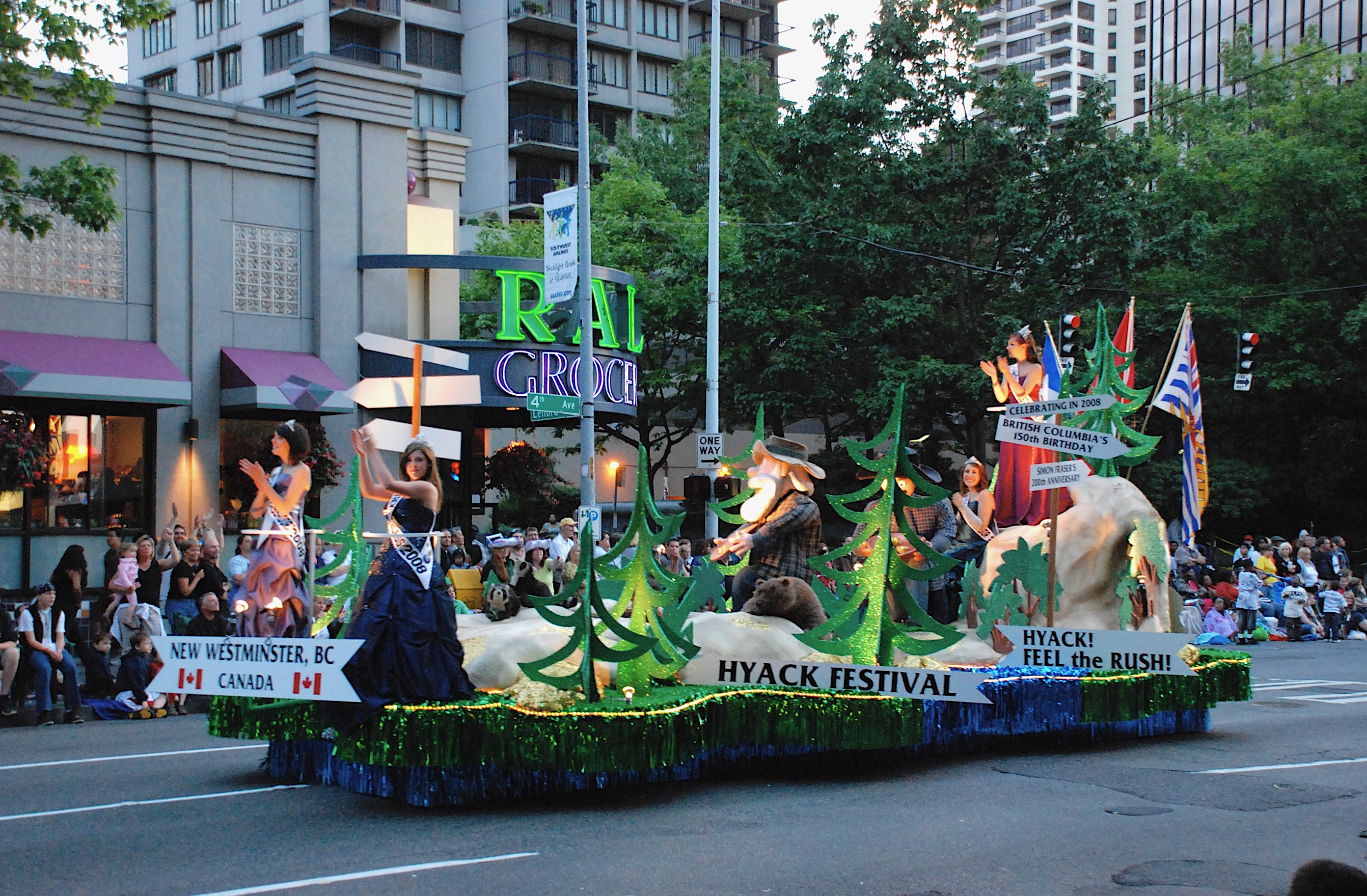
A float in the 2008 Torchlight Parade

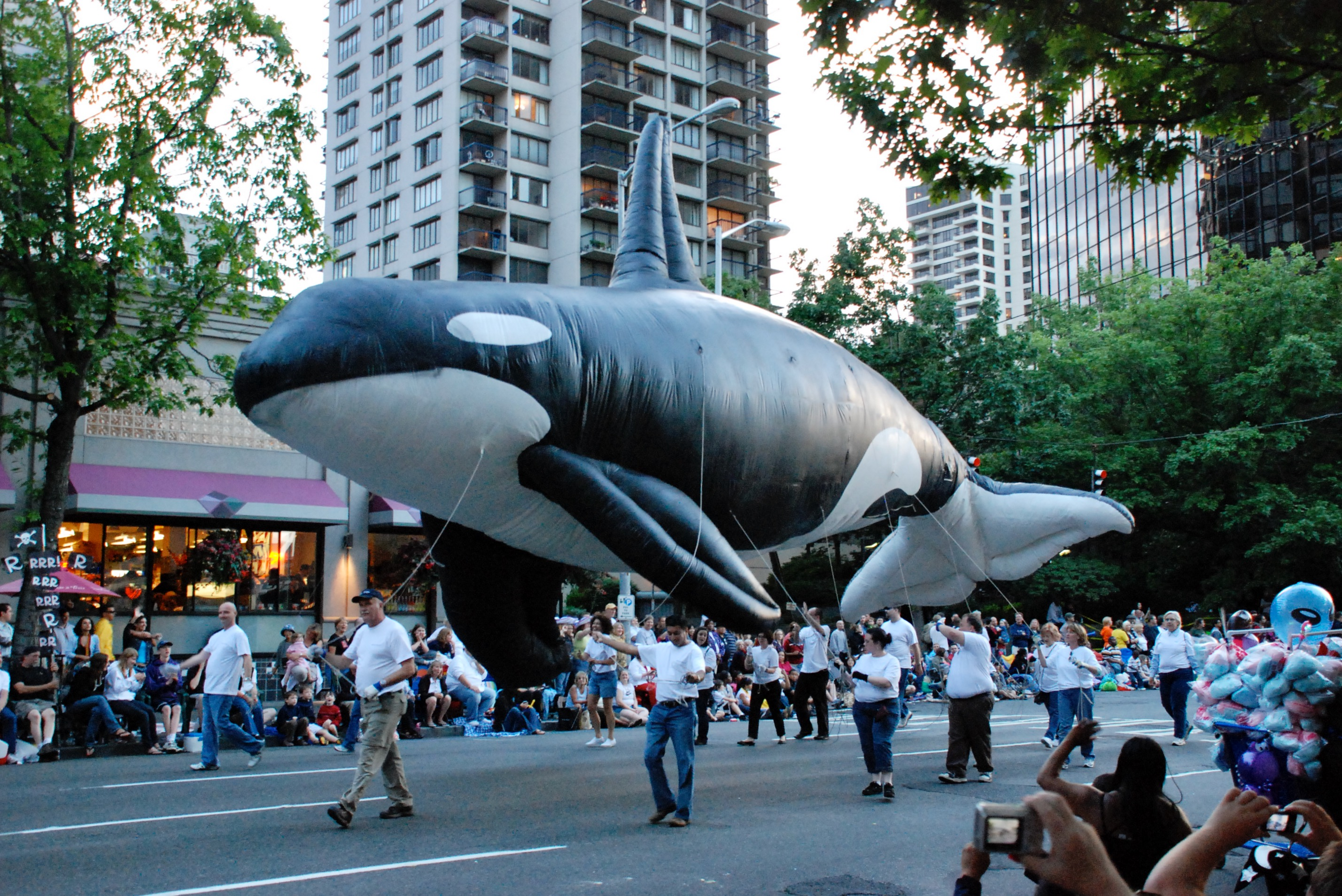
An orca balloon in the Torchlight Parade

The Torchlight Parade is the longest of a series of parades around the greater Seattle area in the U.S. state of Washington. It is under the auspices of Seafair, a Seattle summertime celebration. The parade is one of the original Seafair events dating to the 1950 centennial celebration; the first parade was held on August 12, 1950, in the afternoon, as the Seafair Grande Parade.

The Torchlight Parade is usually held on either the last Saturday in July or the first Saturday in August. Traditionally, the parade started in the evening, close to dusk, which gave it the name. Because of the dark, participants are encouraged to include creative uses of light and luminescent devices in their display. The parade draws an estimated crowd of up to 300,000 people each year. Some of those wanting a prime viewing location arrive the night before with couches, rugs, and portable refrigerators.

The parade has had several route changes in its history. The first year it was held in a loop on 2nd and 3rd Avenues. It was later changed to start at 4th and Madison and make its way to Memorial Stadium. The current, 2-mile (3.2 km) parade route begins by Seattle Center, follows 4th Avenue through Downtown Seattle and ends at Seneca Street. The start time was originally 7:30 p.m. until it was moved up to 3 p.m. in 2023 to provide a "more family-friendly experience". The parade returned to its evening schedule and moved to Alaskan Way on the city's waterfront in 2025.

Participants include, among other things:

- Seafair Pirates
- Seattle All-City Marching Band (one of the longest continuing entrants)
- University of Washington Husky Marching Band
- Multicultural floats, including floats and participants from around the world
- Award-winning drill teams and dance squads such as the Seattle Chinese Community Girls Drill Team
- Dragon dances
- Seafair Clowns
- Blue Angels float
- Companies including Seattle City Light, Group Health and Holland America.
- Hydroplanes and their respective drivers and their families

== See also ==
- Ndocciata, a torchlight parade traditionally held on Christmas Eve in Molise, Italy
