= Seattle Chinese Community Girls Drill Team =

Drill team from Seattle, Washington

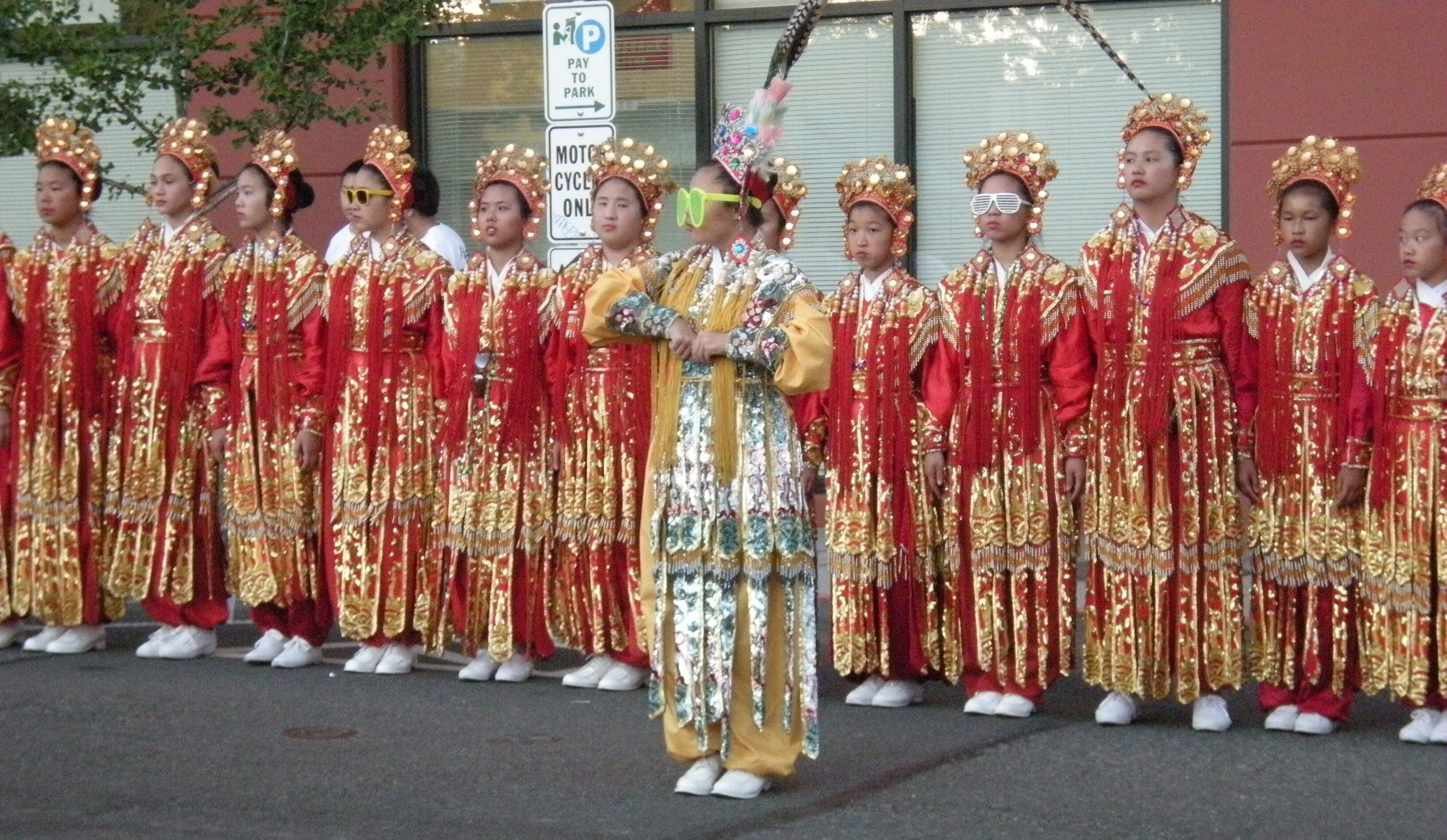
- Drill team at 2008 Seafair Chinatown Parade
- Predecessor: The Chi-ettes
- Formation: 1952
- Founders: Ruby Chow, Ted Yerabek, Foon Woo, Sandra Chow
- Type: Nonprofit
- Location: Seattle, Washington
- Members: 30 (2023)
- Artistic director: Isabelle Gonn
- Affiliations: Chong Wa Benevolent Association, Chinese Parents Service Organization
- Website: seattlechinesegirlsdrillteam.com

The Seattle Chinese Community Girls Drill Team is a drill team for Chinese American girls, based in Seattle, Washington. It was established by Ruby Chow and the Chi-ettes in 1952. The team is noted for combining Cantonese opera and American militaristic marching drill influences. It has participated in the Chinatown Seafair Parade and the Seafair Torchlight Parade yearly since its founding. In 2023, the team had approximately 30 high school members, and was featured in the documentary She Marches in Chinatown.

== History ==
=== The Chi-ettes ===
In Fall 1951, girls from the Chinese Baptist Church created the Chi-ettes, a club for Chinese American girls across schools and neighborhoods. The group's name combined "Chi-" from "Chinese" with "-ette" to denote a small group of young women. It began with fourteen girls who attended Garfield, Franklin, and Cleveland High Schools. The club soon grew to 22 members, all 15-18 years old, and created a new chapter for 12-14 year olds. The club hosted dances, social events, and community service projects, with the goal of uniting girls within Seattle's Chinese community and helping serve that community.

That same year, the Chong Wa Benevolent Association sponsored a Seafair act by a Chinese girls drill team from Victoria, B.C. Ruby Chow was the association's public-relations chair at the time, as well as a successful local restaurateur. Another Chinese girls drill team, the St. Mary's Girls Drum and Bell Corps from San Francisco, performed at the Chinatown Night parade in 1951. Sandra Chow, a member of the Chi-ettes, saw the team perform and raised the idea of forming a Seattle team at the next Chi-ette meeting. The Chi-ettes decided to create the team out of their club and wanted Ruby Chow to join as an advisor because she was a local community leader. The chapter's president, Foon Woo, pitched the idea to Chow, who was enthusiastic and agreed to be the team's director.

=== Creation of the drill team ===
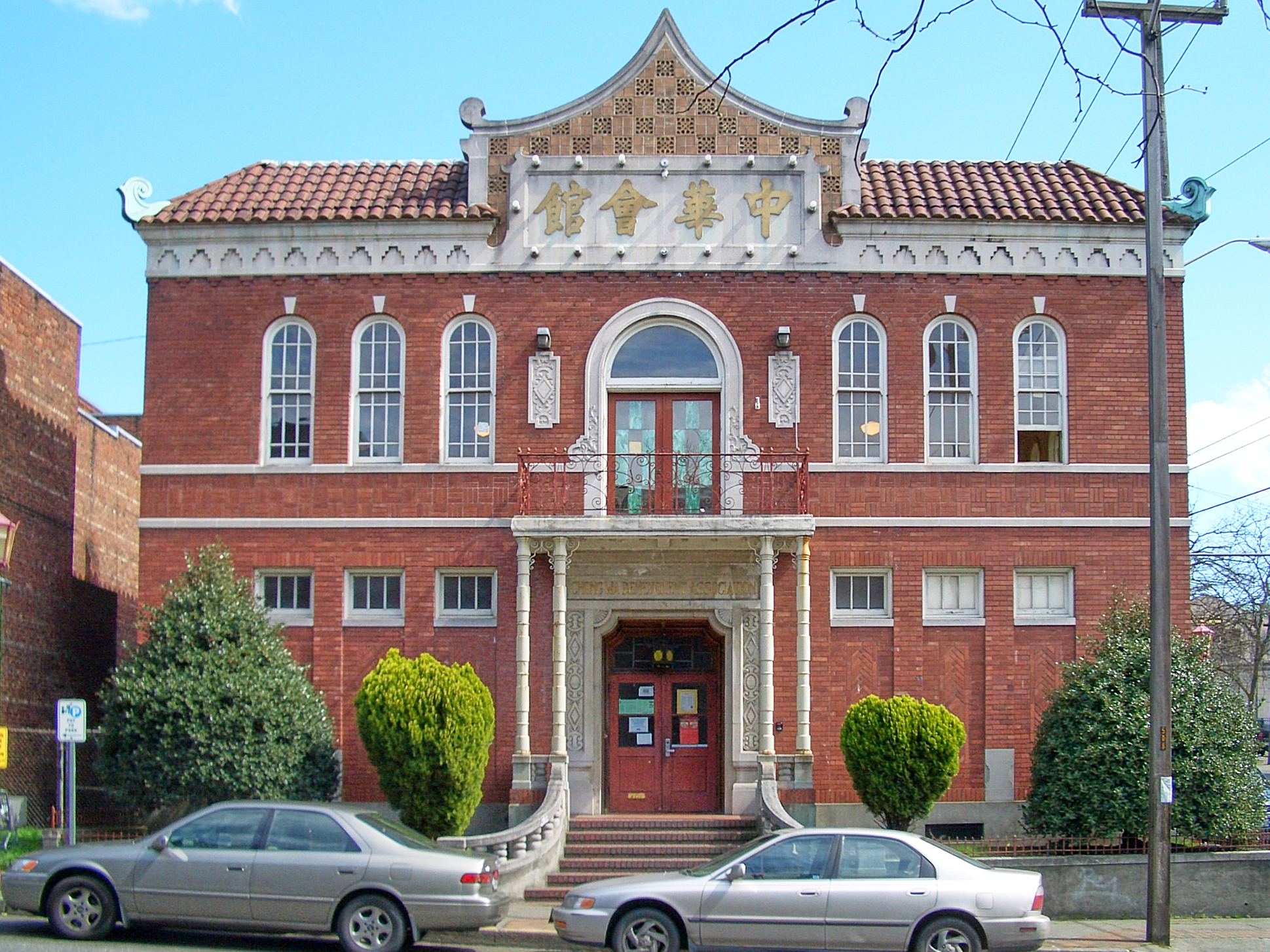
Chong Wa Benevolent Association building (exterior pictured in 2024), where the team practices

Chow obtained the sponsorship of the Chong Wa Benevolent Association and recruited Ted Yerabek to be the team's instructor. Yerabek was a police officer with the Seattle Police Department who patrolled Chinatown, and he had competed with the department's successful Police Drill Team since 1949. Under Yerabek's instruction, the new Seattle Chinese Community Girls Drill Team adopted many of the military-style marches taught by the Police Drill Team. This gave the group a distinctive style from the earlier Victoria and San Francisco teams.

Chow's husband Ping designed the group's original 11-piece costumes, constructed from red and gold silk and satin with a sequined and glass-jeweled headdress. He was a Cantonese opera performer and used his expertise in designing the costumes. The Chows ordered 40 costumes and a 125-foot dragon piece from Hong Kong. Each outfit cost $40 and was one-size-fits-all.

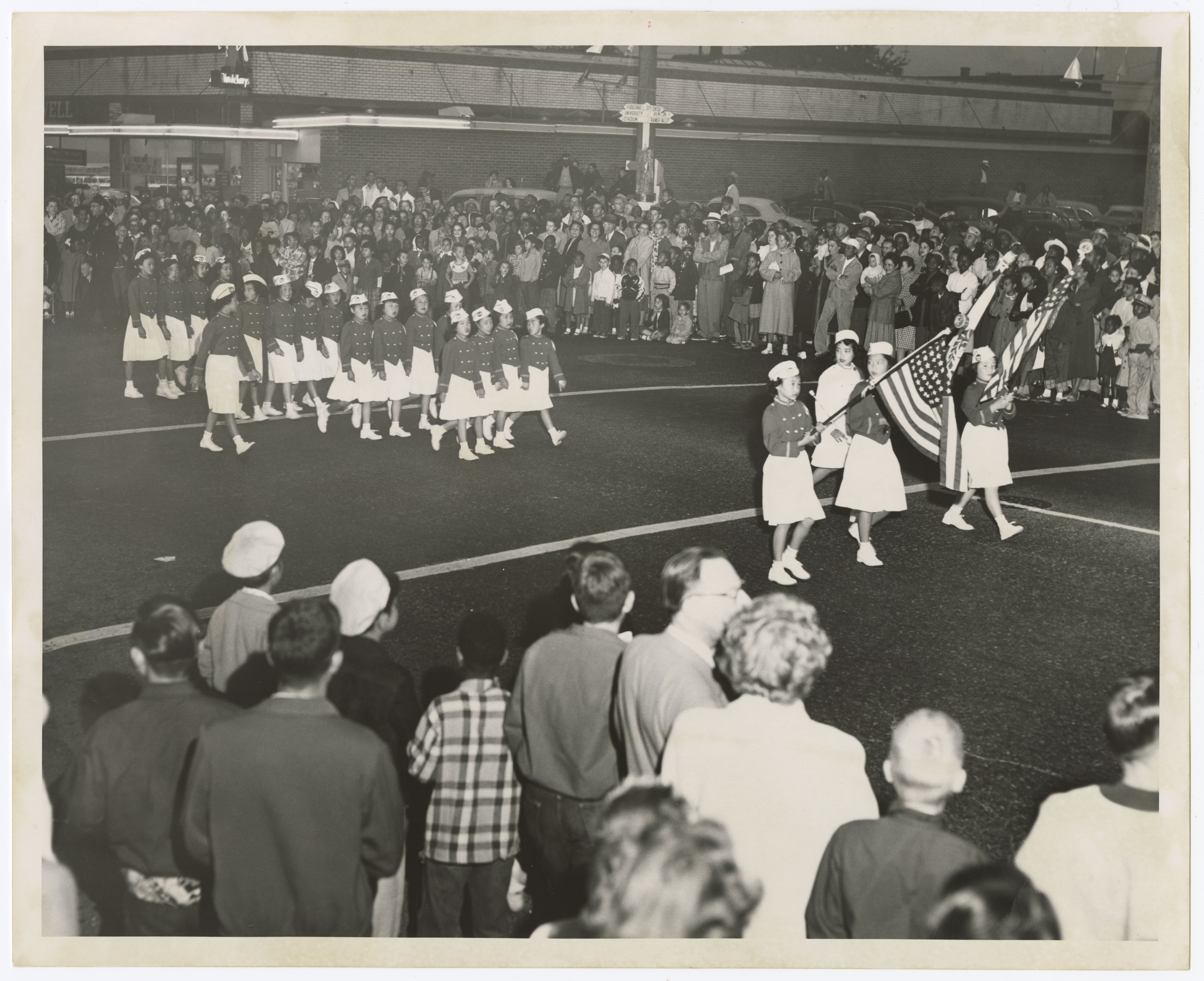
The "Chinese Girl Community Marching unit" at the 1954 Mardi Gras Parade in the Central District, a precursor to the Seafair Chinatown Parade.

The team began in 1952, practicing on Saturdays on 7th Avenue outside the Chong Wa Benevolent Association. Their organization mimicked the Seattle Police Department Drill Team's, with a captain and two lieutenants, both leading a team of 16 girls divided into four squads. They first performed in Summer 1952 and competed in 1953, winning the Seattle Seafair Grand Parade and three other awards that year.

=== Growth ===
In the years after its formation, the drill team was invited to perform in competitions and parades across the U.S. In Seattle, they performed at Seafair every year and for visiting politicians, headlining the 1962 Seattle World's Fair and grand reopening of the 5th Avenue Theater. Across the U.S. they performed at the Portland Rose Parade, San Francisco Chinese New Year parade, Disneyland parade, Omak Stampede, and Philadelphia and Washington D.C. 4th of July parades. The team was also invited to perform in Taipei, Taiwan for the inaugurations of Chiang Kai-shek and Chiang Ching-kuo.

Ted Yerabek retired from the team in 1967, and Cheryl Chow, Ruby Chow's daughter, replaced him as instructor. Cheryl Chow remained involved with the team until her death in 2013.

In 1971, Art Lum created the Chinese Parents Service Organization as a way for parents to get involved in fundraising for the team's outfits and travel. The organization created a cookbook in 1975 called Flavors of China, which held over 200 family recipes submitted during a team fundraiser. It was featured in a 1980 edition of The Ladies Home Journal, and advertised for $6.50, eventually selling hundreds of copies in the U.S. By 2021, eight editions of the cookbook had been published.

=== 21st century ===
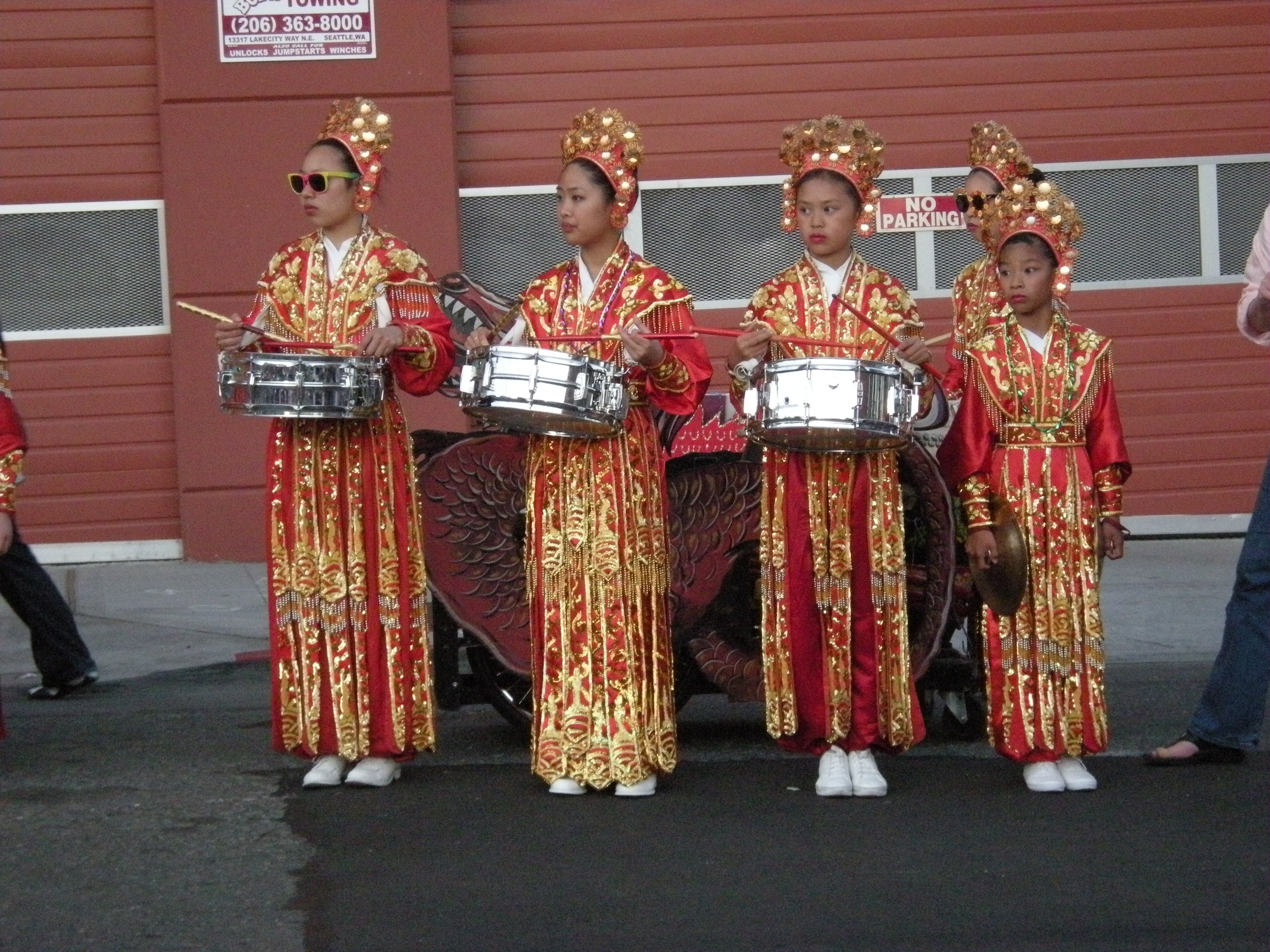
Drill team percussionists at the 2008 Seafair Chinatown Parade.

Over 1,000 girls have participated in the drill team throughout its history. The team has won many awards and trophies. The team shrank over recent years, especially due to the COVID-19 pandemic, decreasing from over 100 members to 30. They did not drill in 2020 or 2021 due to the pandemic.

Della Chen produced a documentary on the team in 2022, She Marches in Chinatown. The documentary team interviewed around 50 members and alumni of the group, and the film included archival footage from 2002 of Ruby and Cheryl Chow.

== Culture ==
The drill team served as a supportive and social opportunity for Chinese American girls in the 1950's and 1960's. Gender and cultural roles, as well as marginalization outside the Chinese American community, severely restricted the opportunities available to Chinese American young women and girls. Cheryl Chow, a drill team member and instructor, later recalled that she did not have the opportunity to play any sports as a youth because Title IX had not yet passed. She also recalled that societally, girls were treated secondarily to boys, and women considered to be supporters for men. For many traditional Chinese families in Seattle, the drill team was one of the few activities girls were allowed to join. Ruby Chow hoped the team would instill confidence and achievement in its members. She wanted all the girls to feel like equals who obtained success as a team, regardless of position, family money, or neighborhood.

The team also served to support cultural pride and ambassadorship in a city with anti-Asian prejudice. As part of their training, Ruby Chow taught the girls to react non-violently and maintain dignity when confronted by racism and harassment. Some audiences spoke slurs and derogatory comments at the team during their marches, and one member recalled that racism was worse in their Seattle performances than in rural towns.

Initially, many team members lived in Chinatown or Beacon Hill, but they later lived in many neighborhoods as Seattle's Chinese American community spread geographically. The team then served as a way for girls to connect back to Chinatown and local Chinese American history and tradition. In 2022, many team members had multiethnic backgrounds or were adopted and saw the team as a way to connect to Chinese culture.

== Performances ==
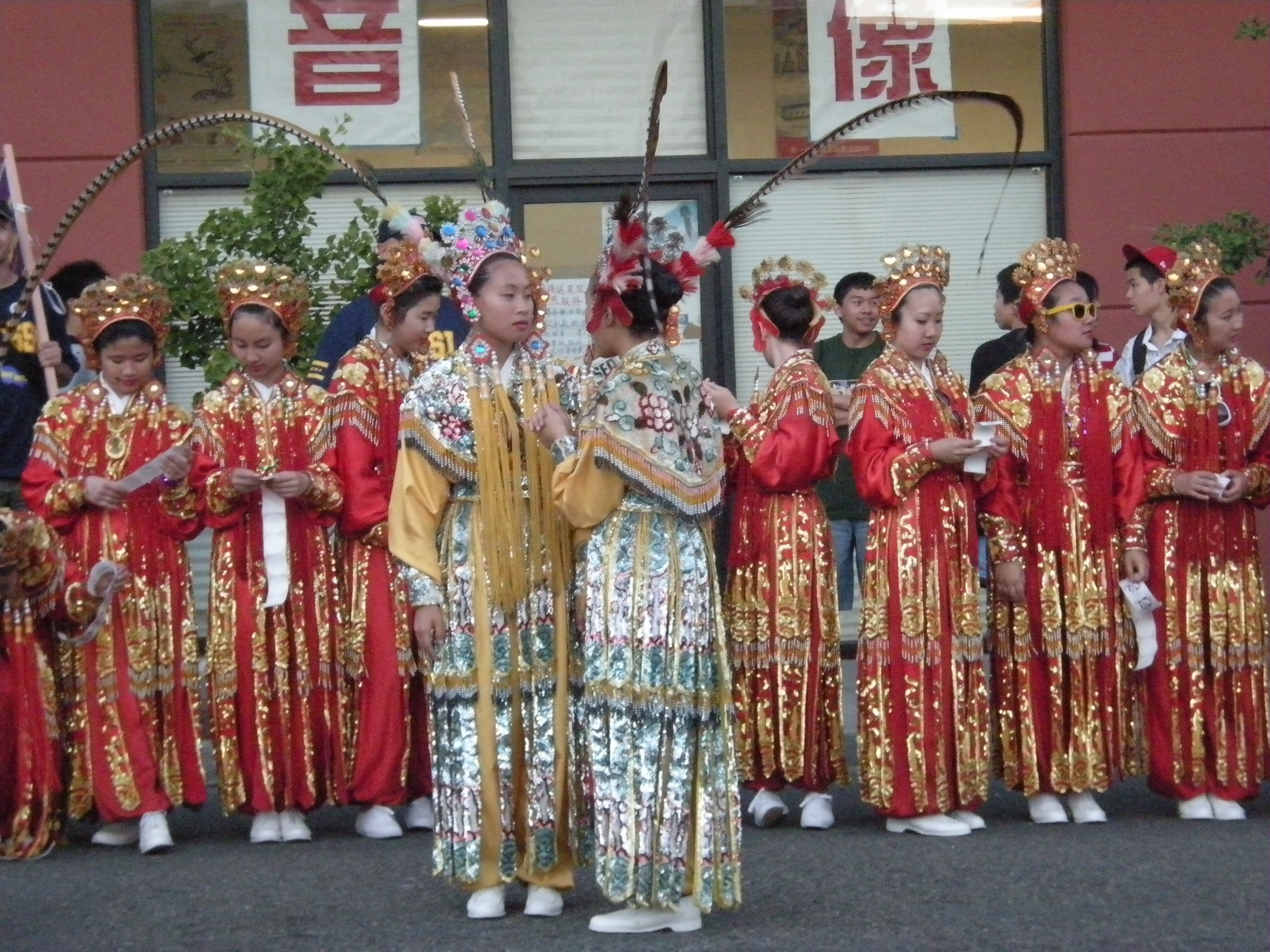
Drill team waits during the 2008 Seafair Chinatown Parade

The team's costumes were designed by Ping Chow, evoking women warriors from Cantonese opera. By 2021, the team had used six different generations of uniforms. The original 1952 costumes were red and gold satin. In 1958, they switched to aqua green uniforms with red-outlined dragons, and added pheasant feathers to officer headdresses. In 1962, they returned to red uniforms with gold trim, with officers wearing gold uniforms with red trim. In 1973, the red uniforms were updated to include white scarves and gloves. In 1989, they used red satin uniforms with gold sequins, weighing eight pounds.

From the group's beginning, members wore white shoes as part of the uniform, which were bought by members or donated from the team. The performers also wore red lipstick, one of Ruby Chow's most frequent reminders before performances.

The drill team's repertoire includes over 50 orders and drills. The original team used the St. Andrew's Cross as the finale to their performances, adding a gin-lai for the final moment. In the St. Andrew's Cross, the girls march in an "X" formation. For the gin-lai, the girls would all perform a single bow to the judges. The team has since used the gin-lai to honor elders and other drill teams during performances.

== See also ==
- History of Chinese Americans in Seattle
