= Seafair Pirates =

The Seattle, Washington Seafair Pirates are a voluntary group of people started in 1949 by the members of the Washington State Press Club. They joined with other community leaders to create Seattle's first Seafair Festival in 1950.

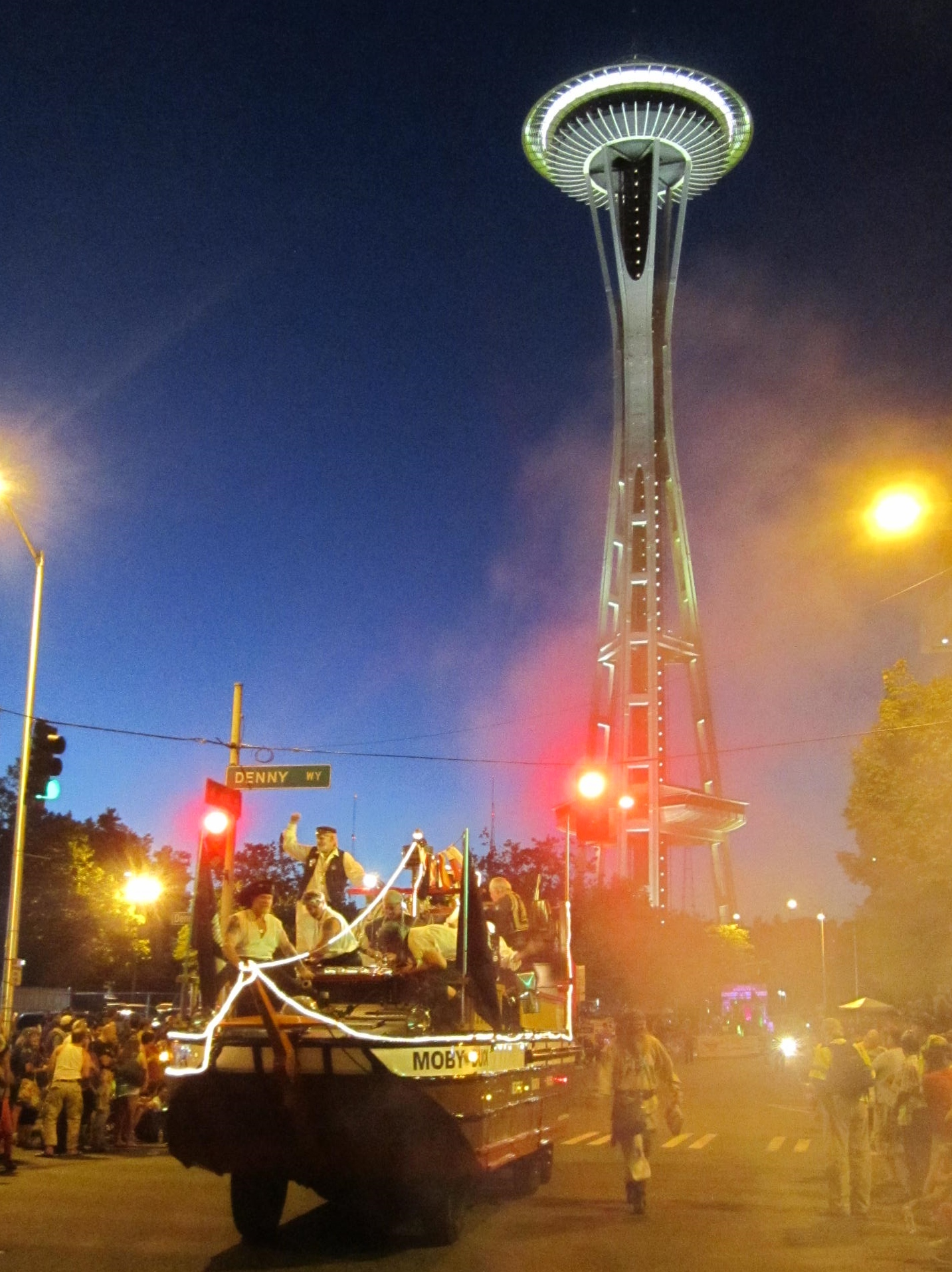
Seafair Pirates Moby Duck at the Torchlight Parade with Seattle's landmark Space Needle in the background (2013)

The Seafair Pirates was founded in 1949 by some of the younger members of the Ale & Quail Society. The group was created to help provide some entertainment and to promote the Seafair festival in Seattle, Washington. The Seafair Pirates are a dedicated group who take their roles as pirates seriously. There is a rigorous process to even being considered when joining the group, as they only want individuals who will dedicate themselves. They are present at the Seafair parades during the summer months, and the boom of their cannons warn the crowd that they are coming.

== Charity ==
The group entertains and raise funds for different charities all year.

== Pirates and Seattle community events ==
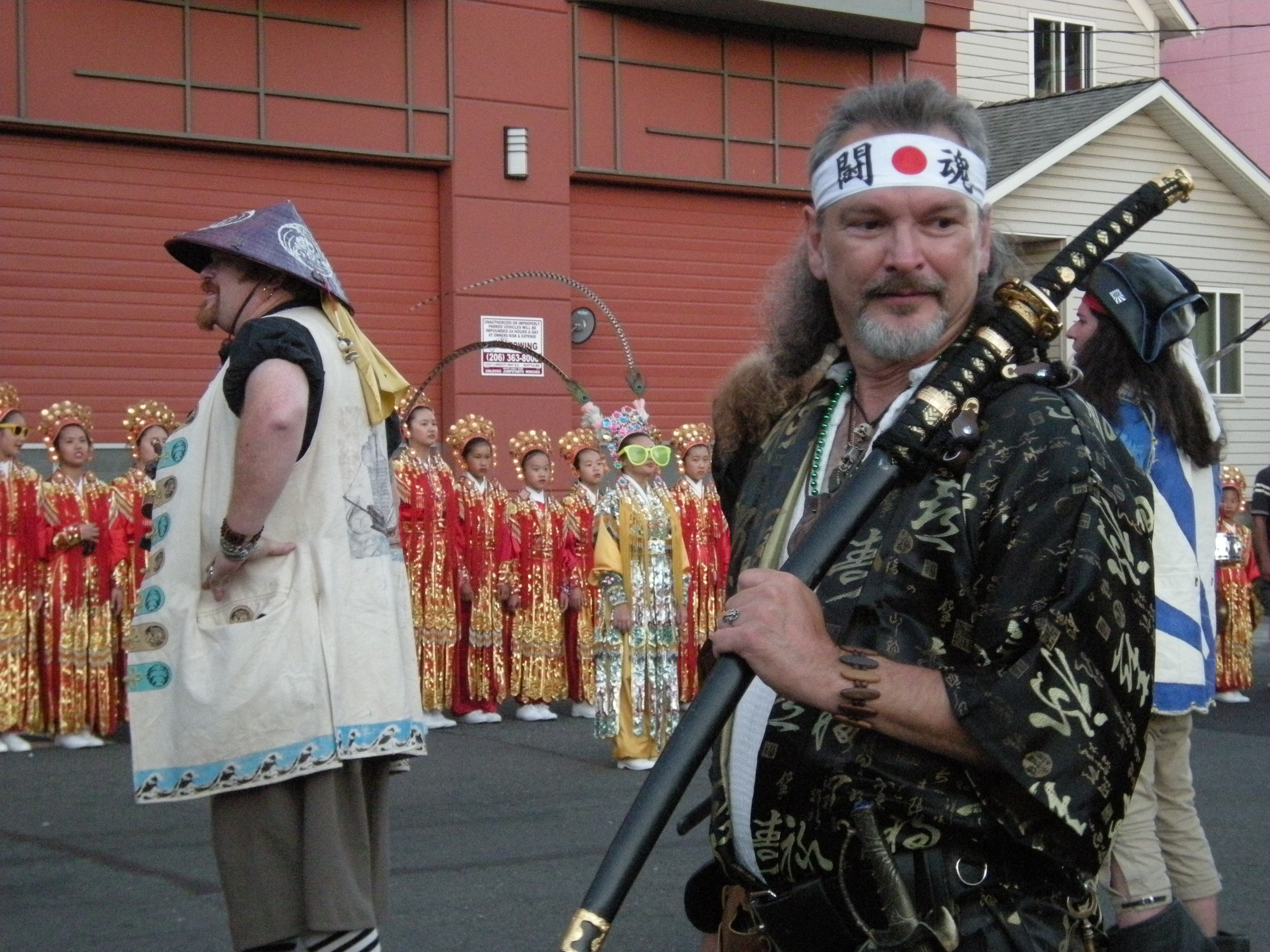
Seafair Pirates at the Chinatown Seafair Parade (2008).

The Seafair festival is a monthlong festival that starts with the Seafair Pirates Landing at Alki Beach in Seattle, usually during the first Saturday of July. Throughout the summer the Seafair Pirates participate in approximately 40 local festivals as well as several hundred private appearances. The grand finale is the Seattle Seafair Torchlight Parade that occurs in August. "Seafair has become a home town jewel that reaches nearly 2 million Puget Sound residents each summer."

The Seafair Torchlight Parade is a regular highlight of the Seafair summer festival. In 1999, the parade featured 4,000 participants on more than 100 floats and in bands and dance and entertainment acts. This parade is ranked the largest nighttime parade in the Northwest, with drill teams, community floats, regional and international bands, equestrian units, giant helium balloons, clowns and pirates.

== The Pirates outside Seattle ==
The Seafair Pirates are goodwill ambassadors for the city of Seattle, and have traveled across the United States and Canada, as well as to Grand Cayman, Mazatlán, Kobe, and Taiwan. They formerly travelled to the Cayman Islands for Pirate Week. In 2007, Sports Illustrated was shooting its Swimsuit Issue for 2008 and the pirates appeared in full uniform with model Melissa Haro.

== History ==
In 1949 the younger members of the Washington State Press Club's action committee, the Ale & Quail Society, founded the Seattle Seafair Pirates. The members of the Society then joined with other community leaders to create Seattle's first Seafair festival in 1950. Since that time the Seattle Seafair Pirates have directed their energies and talents toward the promotion and production of Seattle's annual Seafair festivities.

Every summer since 1950 the Seafair festivities have begun with the annual proclamation of Davy Jones' renewed warfare upon the upstart, so-called "King" Neptune. In due course the city falls and the Mayor hands over the keys to the city at the Pirate's Landing. The Seafair Pirates have triumphed again!

In early days the Seafair Pirates' triumph often included the burning of Neptune's flagship, complete with fire-works. That stopped when the supply of derelict ships became depleted.

The Seafair Pirates are led by Captain Kidd and Davy Jones. Captain Kidd is elected by the Ale & Quail Society to lead their pirate operations. Davy Jones, an honorary Seafair Pirate, is chosen from the Seattle community to sail with the Pirates for one year.

Always seeking to promote Seattle and Seafair, the Seafair Pirates have had many adventures over the years. According to the Pirates' website, in 1953 the Seafair Pirates heard of a fund that had been established to ransom British subjects captured by pirates. By then the fund was worth well over a million dollars. In an attempt to collect this treasure the Seafair Pirates "kidnapped" the British consul and vice-consul, informing the government of Britain that the pirates of old were still in business. While they were mentioned in The Times (of London), they did not receive any payment.

== Pirate ships ==
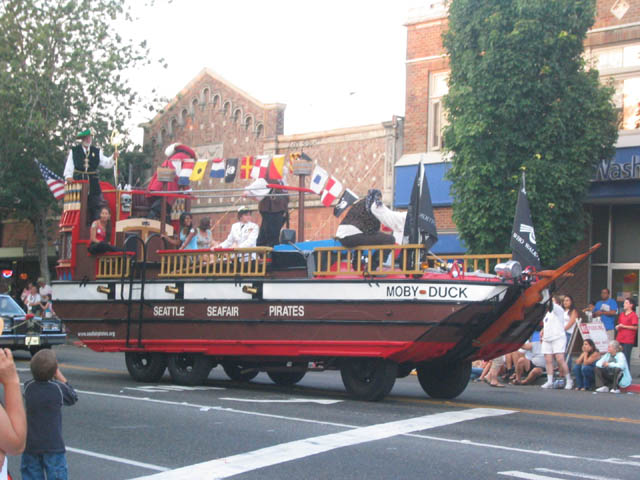
The Moby Duck

The Seafair Pirates command two ships.

The Moby Duck is a former DUKW from World War II which has been highly modified to resemble an old Spanish galleon. The Moby Duck has a Federal Signal Q2B siren. The Moby Duck was formerly amphibious but now sails only on dry land.

In 2006, the pirates acquired a hydroplane, the U-37, better known as the Miss Seattle. The boat had a previous existence as the U-8 Llumar Window Film, and has won the 2005 Seafair Chevrolet Cup (and two other races outside Seattle) and also won the 2006 Seafair Chevrolet Cup. Jean Theoret will continue to pilot the boat in races. The boat's official owner is Billy Schumacher, a boat racing celebrity.
