= Melissa Haro =

American model (born 1987)

- Born: September 5, 1987 (age 39); San Jose, California
- Modeling information
- Height: 5 ft 9 in (1.75 m)
- Hair color: Naturally Light Brown
- Eye color: Blue

Melissa Rose Haro (September 5, 1987) is an American model who appeared in the 2008 and 2009 Sports Illustrated Swimsuit Issue. Her 2008 photo shoot was set in the Cayman Islands during the Pirate Week festival and included many photos in keeping with its motif. Her 2009 photo shoot was set in Riviera Maya.

== Biography ==
She has been modeling since the age of thirteen, and now she mainly models in New York City and Paris, France, but she considers San Jose, California home. She was a model contestant on the first season of Project Runway in 2004 and made it to the final three contestants. She was the youngest model on the show. She was the 2004 Miss Bay Area Teen as well as fourth runner-up in 2004 Miss California and replaced Paris Hilton as a Guess Jeans spokesperson. In addition to Guess, Haro has modeled for Bebe, and Jessica McClintock. Haro is represented by Elite Model Management. In San Francisco, California, she is represented by Look modeling agency. She is also represented by Priscillas Model Management.

Haro, who was born on San Jose's east side, graduated a year early from James Lick High School in 2005 and now lives in Los Angeles, California, near her parents Linda and Dennis Haro. Being a native of the California's San Francisco Bay Area, she is an Oakland Raiders fan and enjoyed shooting in the Cayman Islands during the Pirate Week festival with an all-black suit and boots beneath the skull and bones in keeping with the pirate motif. Haro was joined in the shoot by Seattle's Seafair Pirates who were in full uniform including their tricorn hats.

She is part Italian.
