= SS John Burke =

American Liberty ship

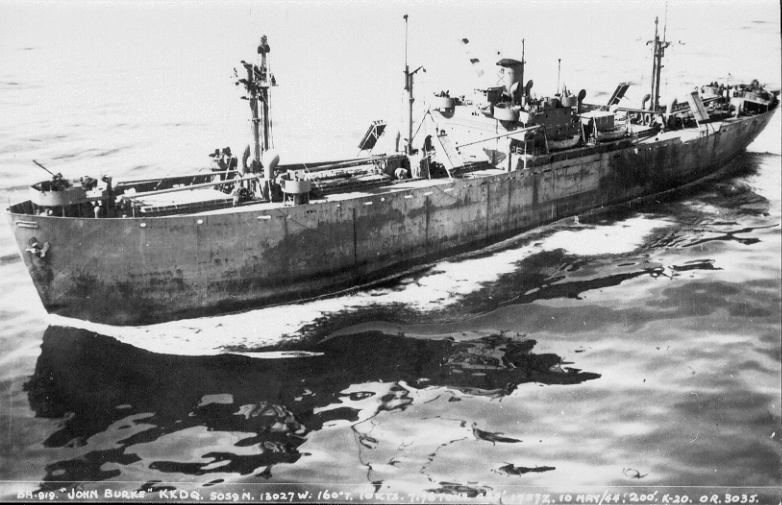
- SS John Burke on 10 May 1944, north west of Vancouver Island, British Columbia, Canada.

History

United States
- Name: John Burke
- Namesake: John Burke
- Owner: War Shipping Administration
- Operator: Northland Transportation Company of Seattle
- Builder: Oregon Shipbuilding Company, Portland, OR
- Laid down: 20 November 1942
- Launched: 15 December 1942
- Acquired: 23 December 1942
- Fate: Lost 28 December 1944 off Negros island, and Siquijor island due to Kamikaze strike

General characteristics
- Type: Liberty ship
- Tonnage: 7,225 GRT; 4,397 NRT
- Displacement: 14,245 long tons (14,474 t)
- Length: 422 ft 10 in (128.88 m)
- Beam: 57 ft 0 in (17.37 m)
- Draft: 27 ft 10 in (8.48 m)
- Depth of hold: 34 ft 10 in (10.62 m)
- Propulsion: Two oil-fired boilers, triple-expansion steam engine, single screw, 2,500 hp (1,864 kW)
- Speed: 11 knots (20 km/h; 13 mph)
- Complement: 40 crew, 28 Armed Guard, 68 total
- Armament: 2 × 3 in (76 mm), 8 × 20 mm guns

SS John Burke (MC hull number 609) was an American Liberty Ship built during World War II, one of the 2,710 type 'EC2-S-C1' ships that carried all kinds and types of dry cargo during the war. The ship was named for John Burke (February 25, 1859 – May 14, 1937), the 10th Governor of North Dakota. John Burke was built at Kaiser Shipbuilding Company's Oregon Shipbuilding yard in Portland, Oregon. John Burke's keel was laid November 20, 1942 and the hull was launched on December 13. After fitting-out, John Burke was delivered to the US Maritime Commission on December 23, just 33 days after construction began. The War Shipping Administration then placed John Burke under management of the Northland Transportation Company.

On December 28, 1944, while transporting ammunition to Mindoro, Philippines, John Burke was hit by a Japanese kamikaze aircraft, and disintegrated in a tremendous explosion with the loss of all souls, approximately 68 merchant marine sailors and armed guards. John Burke was one of three Liberty Ships and one of forty-seven ships sunk by kamikaze attack during World War II.

== Construction and design ==
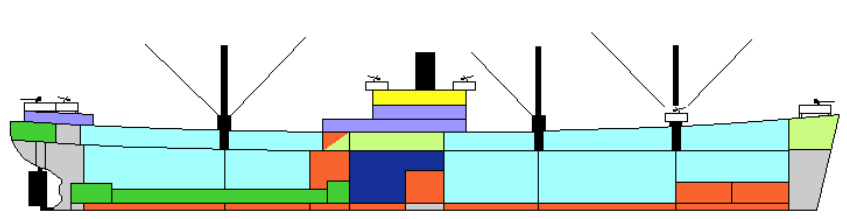
A color-coded diagram of compartments on a Liberty ship, from the starboard side, bow to the right Machinery spaces Command and control Liquid stores Dry cargo Engine room Misc Dry stores Habitation

John Burke was powered by two oil-fired boilers and a single 2,500 hp (1,864 kW) vertical type, triple-expansion reciprocating steam engine. The machinery space (dark blue in the picture) was at the middle of the ship. The single propeller was driven through a long propeller shaft that ran through a tunnel (lower green area in the picture) under the aft cargo holds. The propeller rotated at 76 rpm, giving a speed of about 11 knots (20 km/h; 13 mph). There were two decks running the full length of the ship, with seven watertight bulkheads dividing the machinery space and five cargo holds (light blue in the picture), three ahead of the machinery space and two aft. Crew accommodations were provided in a large three-deck structure located in the middle of the ship (medium blue in the picture) directly above the machinery space, and in a small structure (medium blue in the picture) located at the stern. The bridge, radio room and Captain's quarters were on the top deck (yellow in the picture) of the three-deck structure. The fuel for the boiler was carried in several tanks (orange in the picture) located throughout the ship. Ship's storage (light green in the picture) was located at the bow and above the machinery space. Gun crew quarters and the ship's hospital were in the stern structure. When the ship was armed, the gun 'tubs' (white in the picture) were located at the bow, stern and above the bridge. These could be any mixture of 5 in (130 mm) caliber gun, 4 inches (101.60 mm), 3 in (76 mm), 40 millimetres (1.57 in), 20 millimetres (0.79 in) and/or .5 inches (12.70 mm) caliber guns.

The ship's steering was by a contrabalanced rudder (black, at left in the picture), with its associated steering gear located in a compartment (green in the picture) above the rudder and below the aft structure. Steam-powered generators provided electric power for radios, navigation equipment, refrigeration compressors, pumps, lighting, and degaussing. An evaporator produced fresh water for the boilers and for the crew. Large hatches above the cargo holds allowed steam winches and booms rigged to three centerline masts to quickly load or unload cargo.

== History ==
Liberty ships were an expedient solution to a pressing problem, and it was never intended that they last more than five years. It is remarkable that two (SS John W. Brown and SS Jeremiah O'Brien) have not only survived seventy plus years of service, but that they are in 'like-new' condition, and are open to the public as museums. The British needed a way to replace the ships lost to German U-boats, but did not have the resources to build them. In 1939, they asked the United States to help solve the problem, bringing a ship design that they wanted built. The design was modified to fit American production methods, and five new shipyards were built to give the shipbuilding industry capacity. These ships were called Ocean ships with each ship's name starting with Ocean.

The United States needed more ships as war approached. The 'Ocean' design was revised and simplified to allow mass production. This new design was the basis for the Liberty ship. On December 7, 1941, Japan attacked the military bases at Hawaii, Guam, and the Philippines. Liberty ships carried weapons, ammunition, food, tools, hardware, vehicles, and other things for the war effort. They could also be equipped to carry a large number of troops by rigging bunks in the holds similar to those used by the armed guard. Liberty ships began taking troops and materials wherever they were needed, crossing both the Atlantic and Pacific Oceans. Like other Liberty Ships, John Burke transported war materials between the United States and the rear areas of the Pacific War, often calling at Pearl Harbor, Australia, Guadalcanal, Hollandia and Manaus.

On what would be her final trip in late 1944, Burke departed Seattle, Washington for Guam, where she spent several days loading munitions for the invasion force on the island of Mindoro. Burke then departed with the 100-ship "Uncle Plus 13" convoy, bound for Leyte in the Philippines. The convoy arrived at Leyte the night of December 27.

Japanese forces were alerted to the convoy's arrival shortly before daybreak on December 28. A flight of six Japanese kamikaze fighter/bombers was sent up from Cebu Island shortly after dawn. If the convoy was destroyed, the U.S. forces on Mindoro would be cut off from their supply line.

That morning Burke and the other ships in the Mindoro-bound TG 77.11 (under the command of Captain George F. Mentz) were at general quarters shortly after receiving the dawn weather report that reported that air cover would not launch until the poor weather cleared. The crews began their wait for the inevitable arrival of Japanese aircraft.

== Destruction ==
At about 08:15, the first kamikaze appeared on the American ships' radar, and orders were given for the convoy to begin evasive maneuvering. Through holes in the clouds, the Japanese pilots sighted the American force as it steamed south of Cebu and Bohol Islands. The Japanese aircraft were three A6M Zero fighters of the 201st Air Group, which had taken off from Cebu at 09:50 led by Lt. Masami Hoshino (星野政己) and each carried a 250 kg bomb. Diving through anti-aircraft fire and despite damage to his aircraft, the Japanese pilot crashed between Burke's #2 and #3 cargo holds.

A brief flash of fire was visible and for several seconds, only smoke could be seen billowing from her hold. A few seconds later, a huge pillar of fire shot out of Burke's cargo hold, followed by an immense cloud of white smoke before an enormous blast wave and fireball erupted as her cargo of munitions detonated, instantly destroying the ship and killing her crew of 40 merchant marine sailors and 28 or 29 armed guards. For several seconds, Burke was not visible under a mushroom cloud of smoke, fire and explosions. Several ships nearby were damaged by the force of the blast and flying debris. The shockwave rocked the entire convoy with ships reporting that they had been torpedoed. A United States Army Freight and Supply (FS) ship just aft of Burke was severely damaged by the blast, sinking before it could be identified. As the cloud of smoke cleared, nearby ships closed on Burke's former position to search for survivors but Burke, and all aboard her, were lost.

The Combat Air Patrol arrived at 12:13 after the weather cleared, providing air cover for the next three hours.

The Japanese attack that morning was the beginning of a two-day series of attacks on the convoy, sinking several more ships and costing hundreds of lives. The force reached its destination at 06:48 December 30 with materials for the Mindoro invasion.

Today, SS John Burke's fragments lie 1,500 feet (457 m) below the surface, in the vicinity of 9°1′11″N 123°26′50″E, the location the ship was last seen, in the strait between Negros, Siquijor Islands and Dapitan, Zamboanga del Norte, Mindanao, Philippines.

== See also ==
- List of Liberty ships
- Ocean ship

== Liberty Ship Resources ==
- SS John W. Brown website
- SS JEREMIAH O'BRIEN website
