= Straits Steamship Company (North America) =

Shipping company in the Pacific Northwest

- Industry: Shipping
- Founded: (July 1, 1894)
- Area served: Strait of Juan de Fuca, San Juan Islands, Puget Sound
- Key people: James Morgan, L. B. Hastings, W.S. Mann, and A.L. Horn.

The Straits Steamship Company was a shipping firm that operated steamships on Puget Sound and the Strait of Juan de Fuca.

== Formation ==
The company was formed on July 1, 1894, by Capt. James Morgan, L. B. Hastings, W.S. Mann, and A.L. Horn.

== Operations ==
The company operated the steamships Willapa and Garland on the route from Seattle to Neah Bay, and the Evangel on the route Seattle – Port Townsend – Port Angeles – Dungeness – Victoria. In the first decade of the 1900s, the company provided service to Friday Harbor, on San Juan Island.
