= Island Transportation Company =

US company

- Type: Shipping
- Founded: 1889
- Defunct: 1890
- Area served: San Juan Islands, Puget Sound
- Key people: Herbert F. Beecher

The Island Transportation Company was a shipping company that was briefly operational in Puget Sound from 1889 to 1900.

== Formation and operations ==
The company was organized in April 1889 by Herbert F. Beecher, who had recently left the employment of the customs office, and others. The company purchased three smaller steamers, of the coastal or inland variety: the J.B. Libby, Point Arena, and General Miles. These vessels were employed in northern Puget Sound and the San Juan Islands.

The company suffered a major reverse when J.B. Libby got fire on November 10, 1889, while transporting a cargo of lime from Roche Harbor. The vessel was a total loss, and while operations were resumed for a time with General Miles taking the place of the Libby, the company ceased operations some time in 1890, when Beecher took a job as a pilot for the U.S. revenue cutter service.
