= Pier 54 (disambiguation) =

Pier 54 may refer to the following:

- Pier 54, New York, a pier in New York, currently in ruins, but once used by the Cunard Line.
- Pier 54, Seattle, a pier in Seattle, built in 1900, still in use as of 2011.
