= Puget (steam ferry) =

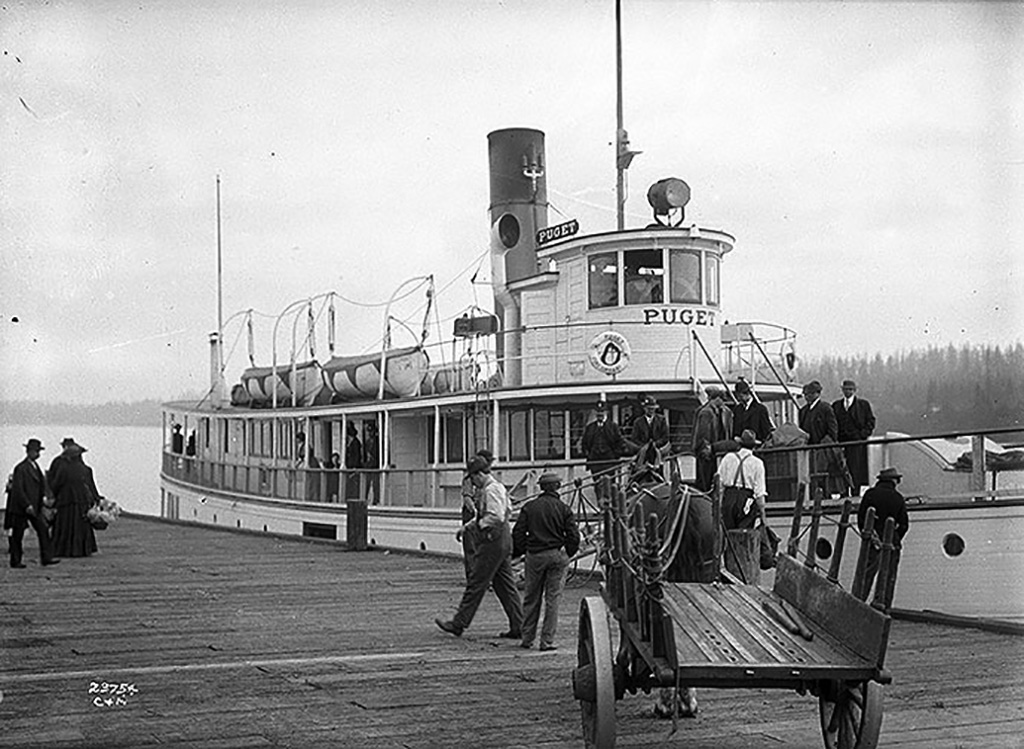

History
- Name: Puget
- Laid down: 1908
- Fate: Abandoned, 1940

General characteristics
- Type: Inland steamboat
- Installed power: steam engine
- Propulsion: propeller

The steam ferry Puget operated in the early 1900s as part of the Puget Sound Mosquito Fleet.
