= Seafair =

Summer celebration in Seattle, Washington, United States

- Locations: Seattle, Washington, U.S.
- Years active: 1950–2019, 2021–present
- Website: www.seafair.org

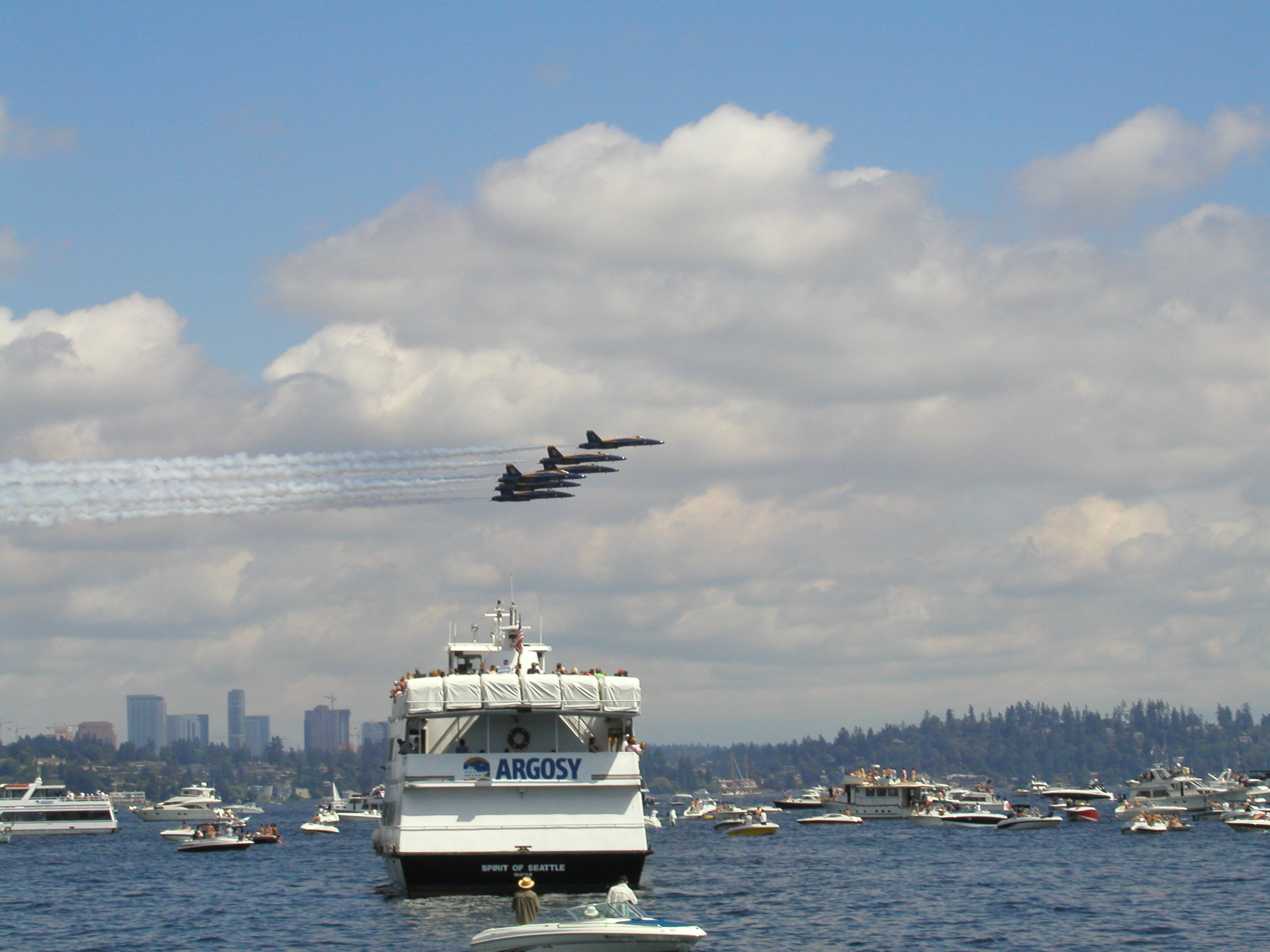
The Blue Angels performing over Lake Washington in 2007, with the Bellevue skyline in the background

Seafair is an annual summer boating event, air show, and festival in Seattle, Washington, United States, that encompasses a wide variety of small neighborhood events leading up to several major citywide celebrations. Its main events include the Torchlight Parade (and accompanying Torchlight Run), Seafair Cup hydroplane races, and an air show that often features the Blue Angels. Seafair also encompasses smaller block parties and local parades around the city and Seattle metropolitan area.

== History ==
Seafair has been an annual event in Seattle since 1950 but its roots can be traced to the 1911 Seattle Golden Potlatch Celebrations.

The 2020 schedule for Seafair was cancelled on May 20, 2020, due to the COVID-19 pandemic and restrictions on public gatherings. The next edition of Seafair was also cancelled in April 2021, stating that "while encouraged by Governor Inslee's Phase 3 guidelines that support small and medium size events to return with limitations, Seafair leadership recognizes the guidelines will not support events the scale of a city-wide festival."

== Events ==
Seafair begins in mid-June; since 1949, its arrival has been heralded by the Seafair Pirates Landing on Alki Beach, and the Milk Carton Derby on Green Lake, a whimsical boat race in which all the boats have been constructed out of empty milk cartons. Entries always range from those carefully shaped for speed and stability to those designed for maximum amusement. The Derby is usually associated with a variety of activities for children and families on the shores of Green Lake.

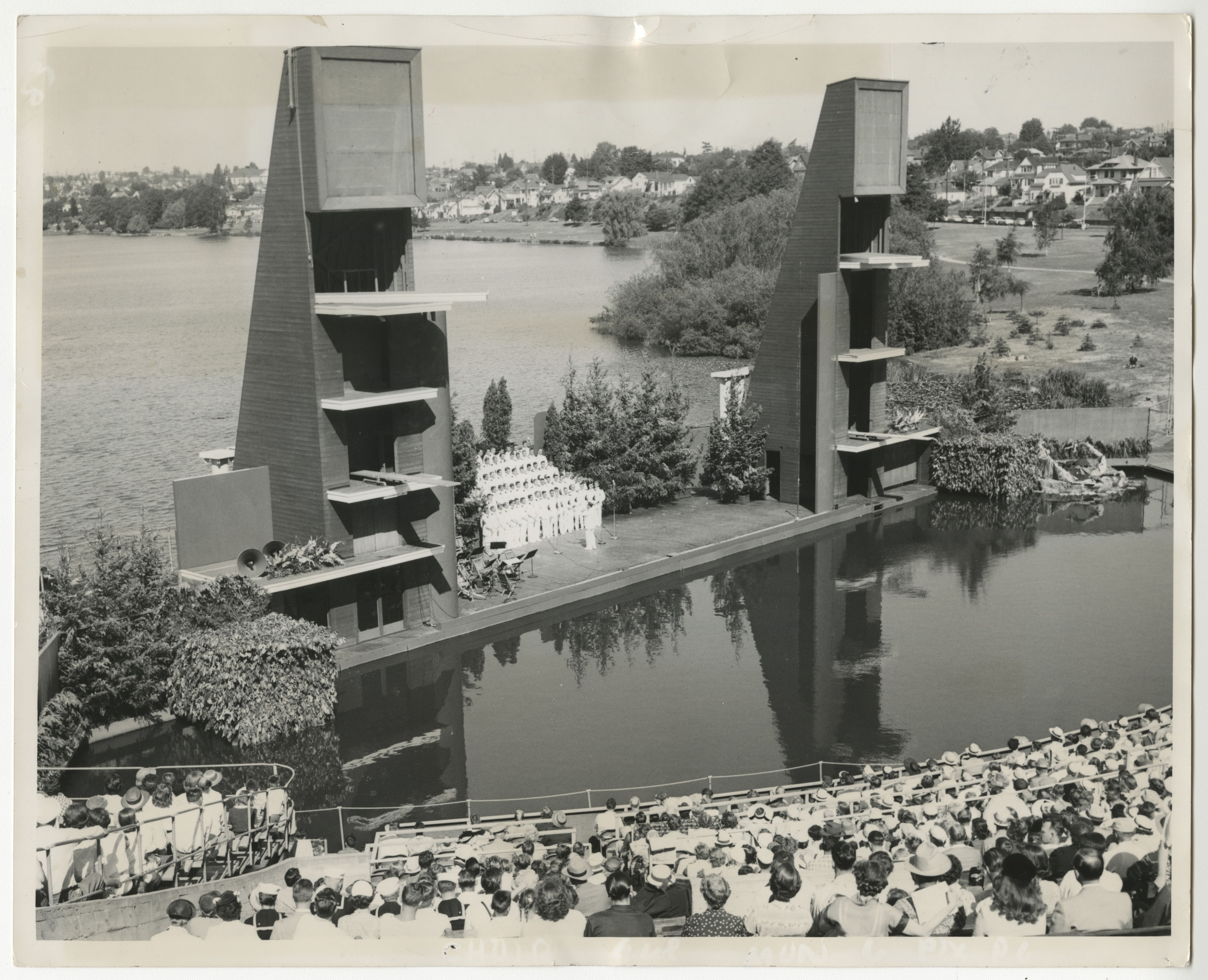
Naval Air Cadet Choir performs at the Green Lake Aqua Theater for 1954 Seafair

The Green Lake Aqua Theater was built in 1950, to host the Aqua Follies "swimusicals" – a water ballet, diving, dancing, and comedy show produced by Al Sheehan.

A half marathon was added in 2002, followed three years later by the full Seafair Marathon. Participants can run or walk the 21.0975-kilometre (13.1094 mi) and 42.195-kilometre (26.219 mi) courses. If a shorter distance is more appealing, participants can run or walk a 5 km course. The 2008 Seafair Half Marathon and Seafair Marathon began at Husky Stadium, crossed the Evergreen Point Floating Bridge, and ended at Bellevue, Washington's Bellevue Downtown Park. After the race, live music was performed. In 2009, the Seafair Marathon and Half Marathon were replaced with the Rock 'n' Roll Seattle Marathon and Half Marathon.

In 2013, an Independence Day fireworks show at Lake Union known as the Seafair Summer Fourth was added. The event serves as a de facto successor to the Family Fourth fireworks event formerly held at the same site, which had been discontinued by its organizers due to a lack of funding. The event was revived under the auspices of Seafair with the financial support of local sponsors.

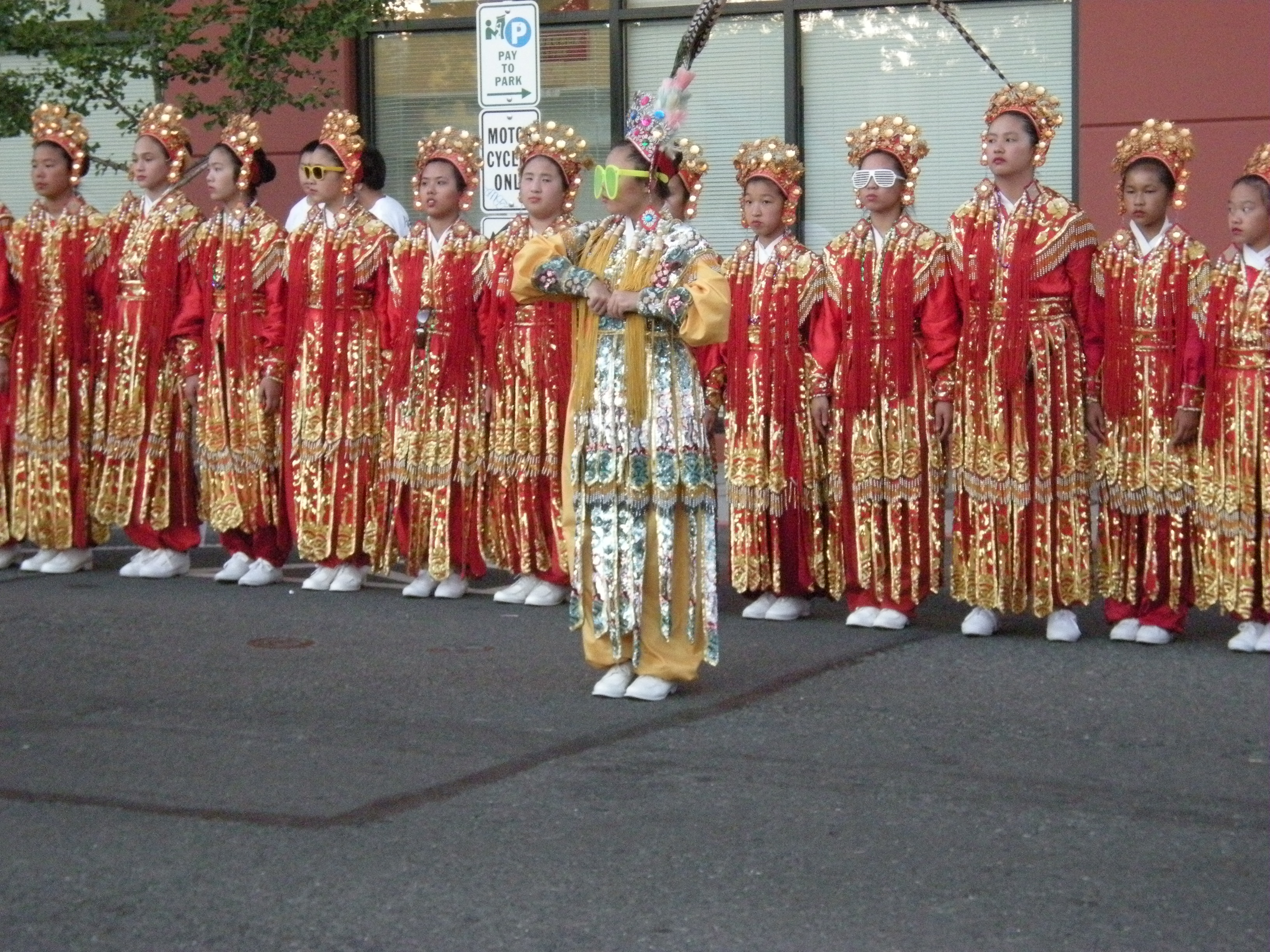
Drill team waits during the 2008 Chinatown Seafair Parade

The Seafair Triathlon is held on the shores of Lake Washington from Seward Park. It features both Sprint – half-mile swim, 12-mile (19 km) bike ride, and 5 km run – and Olympic distances. Participants can compete individually or as a team. Typically, the Seafair Triathlon is held the third weekend of July. In 2007, the Seafair Triathlon saw a record turnout of 2,200.

The Chinatown Seafair Parade occurs annually. It is organized by the Greater Seattle Chinese Chamber of Commerce and takes place in Seattle's Chinatown-International District. The Huayin Performing Arts Group, Chinatown Dragon Team, Seattle Chinese Community Girls Drill Team, Seattle All City Marching Band, and Dolls & Gents Drill Team and Drumline are among the local performance groups that participate. The Seafair Clowns and Pirates have also joined. The parade began in 1950: that year Seattle's Chinese American community expanded lion dances as part of Seafair's International Carnival events, started the Chinatown parade, and began sending performance groups to the Torchlight Parade.

=== The Torchlight festivities ===
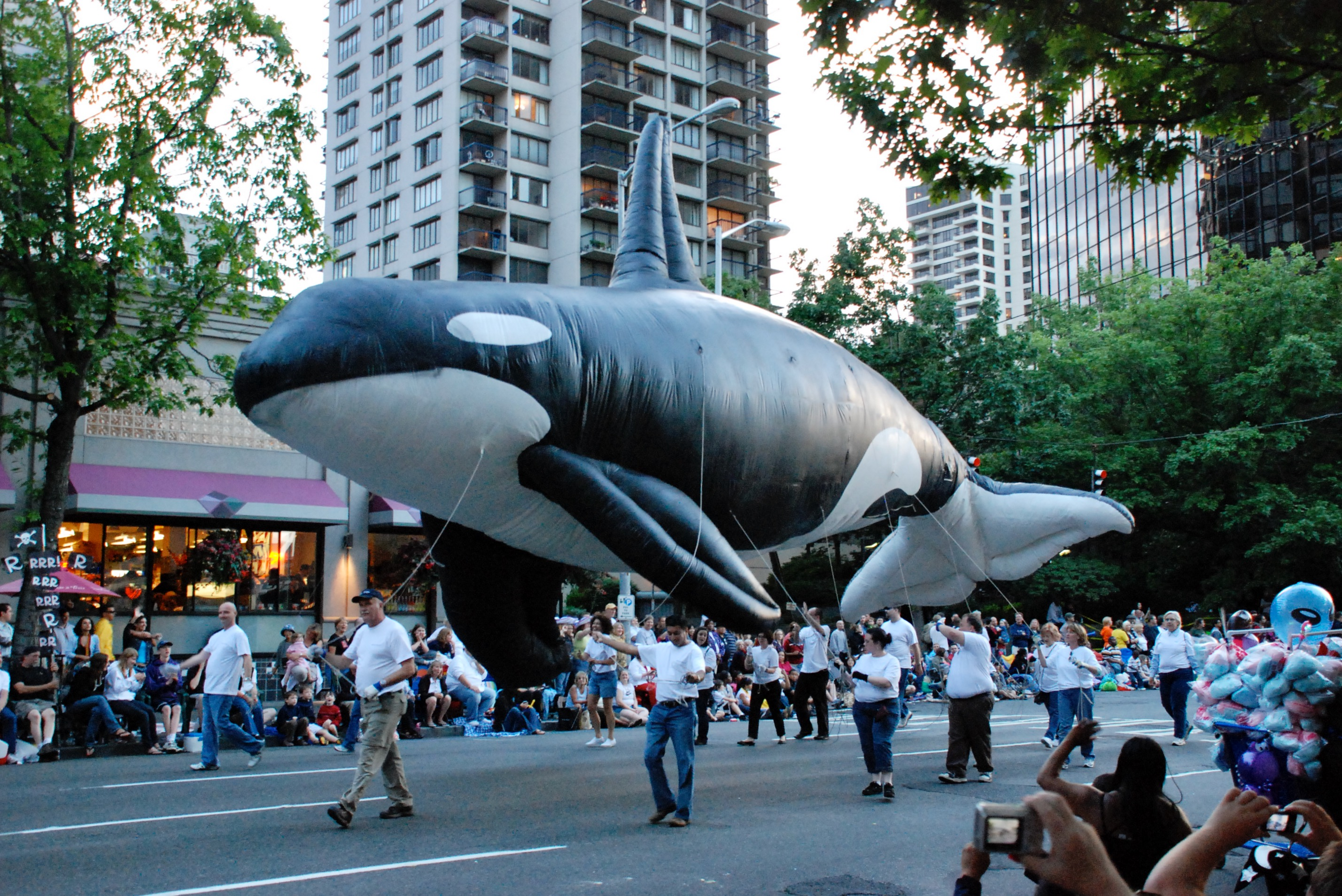
Orca balloon in the 2008 Seafair Torchlight Parade

The last weekend in July belongs to the Torchlight Parade and Torchlight Run. Many local organizations participate in these events, held on the streets of Downtown Seattle. The local woman who has been selected as "Miss Seafair" (prior to 1972, "Seafair Queen") plays a prominent role in the parade. It is traditionally preceded by the Torchlight Run, a short (8 km) race through the city's streets in which many participants run in costume.

=== Seafair Weekend ===
One of the most popular events of the festival is the Seafair Weekend, held traditionally the first weekend of August on Genesee Park. Seafair Weekend main events include hydroplane racing on the water and aerobatics show in the sky.

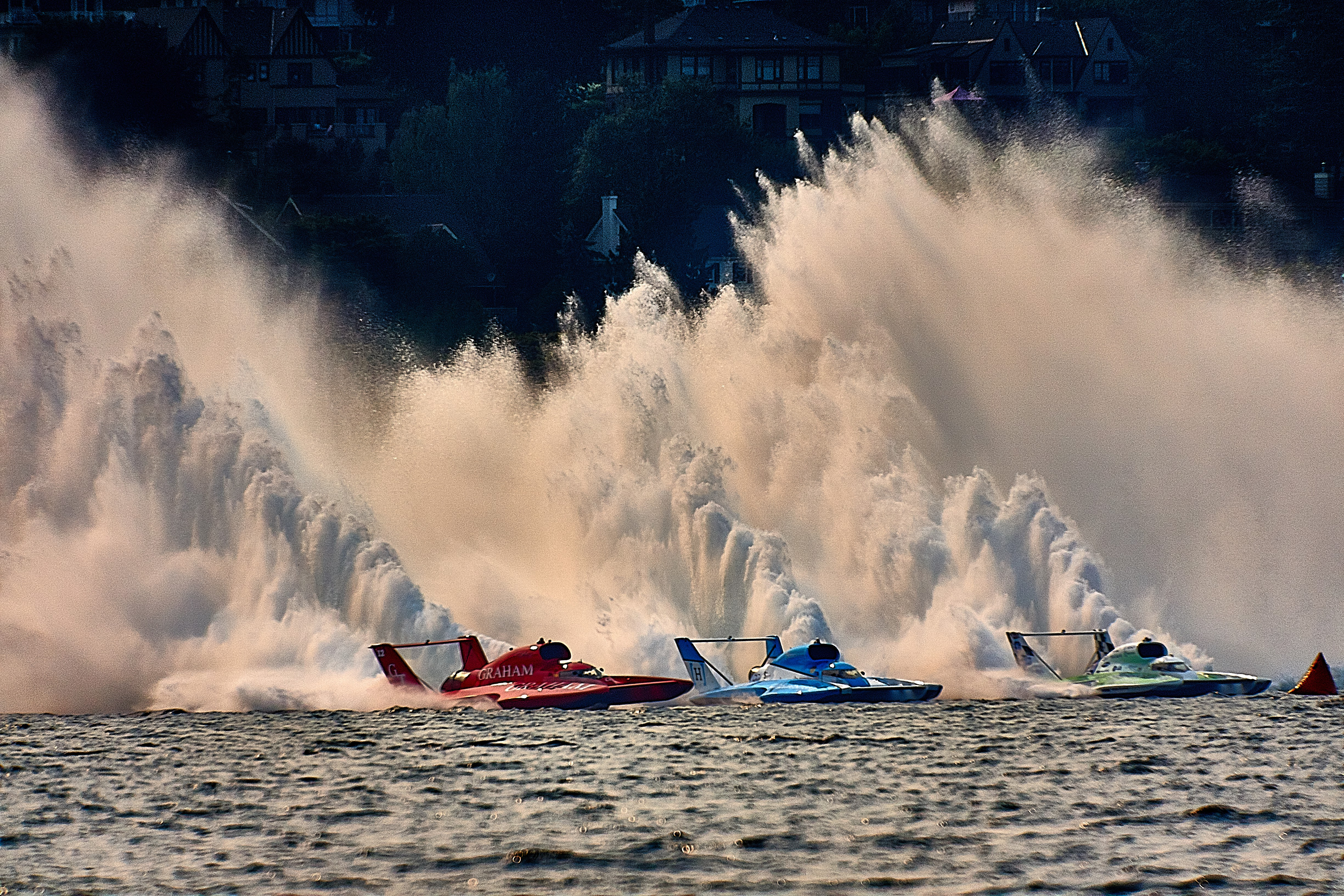
Racers at Seafair 2017

The Seafair Cup is an American Boat Racing Association unlimited hydroplane racing circuit stop at Stan Sayres Memorial Park on Lake Washington, in the Seward Park neighborhood. The races attract tens of thousands of spectators, both those standing on the public shores of the lake, and those in boats anchored to logs (known as the "Log Boom") just outside the course in the lake itself. Mercer Island High School's student-run FM radio station, KMIH 88.9 The Bridge, is the designated radio broadcast for hydroplane racing and the airshows throughout the weekend.

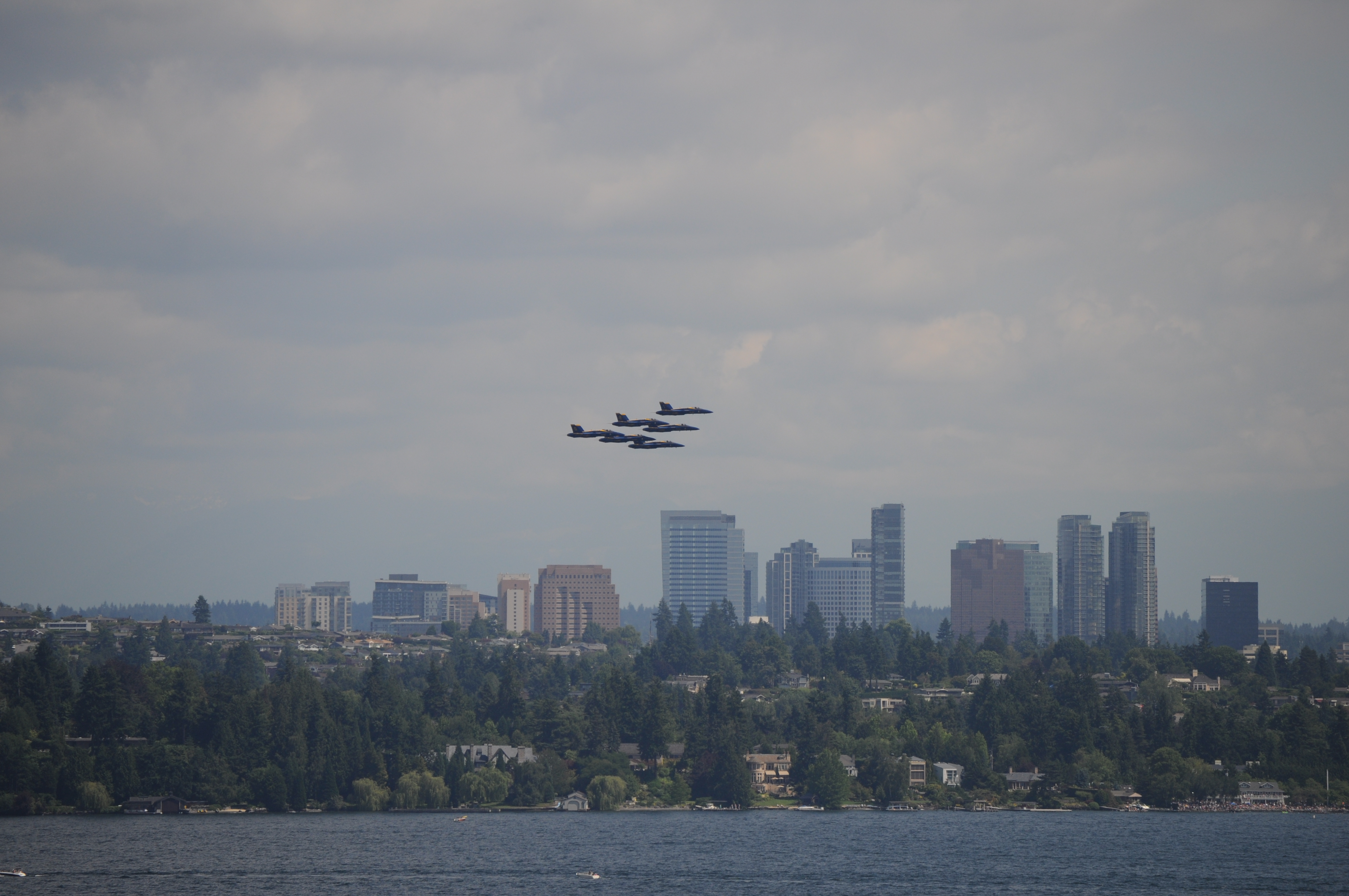
Blue Angels viewed from Madrona, Seattle at Seafair 2011

A tradition started in 1972, the Seafair Air Show is an aerobatics show coincidently with the days of the Seafair Cup. World-class aerobatics teams perform their aerial stunts over Lake Washington, most prominently the US Navy Blue Angels and US Army Golden Knights. Notoriously, the Blue Angels have been attending the Air Show annually since its first edition, excepting in three occasions. The aerobatics show is a slightly controversial part of Seafair, as some local residents fear an accident involving the low-flying aircraft, and some find the noise of the jet engines irritating. There was no show at Seafair in 1994 and 1995 as a result of a dispute with the FAA about whether they could safely fly over Lake Washington. In 1996 the Blue Angels flew over Elliott Bay, west of downtown Seattle, in a separate event from the hydroplane race, but this was a financial flop, and they returned to being part of the race-weekend festivities over Lake Washington in 1997. Due to government budget cuts, the Blue Angels did not perform at Seafair 2013; they were replaced by the Patriots Jet Team. From 2019, the aerobatics show fly-over area was moved south to avoid the closing of the floating bridges carrying Interstate 90 between Mercer Island and Seattle during the three days of Seafair Weekend.

== Groups ==
=== Seafair Pirates ===
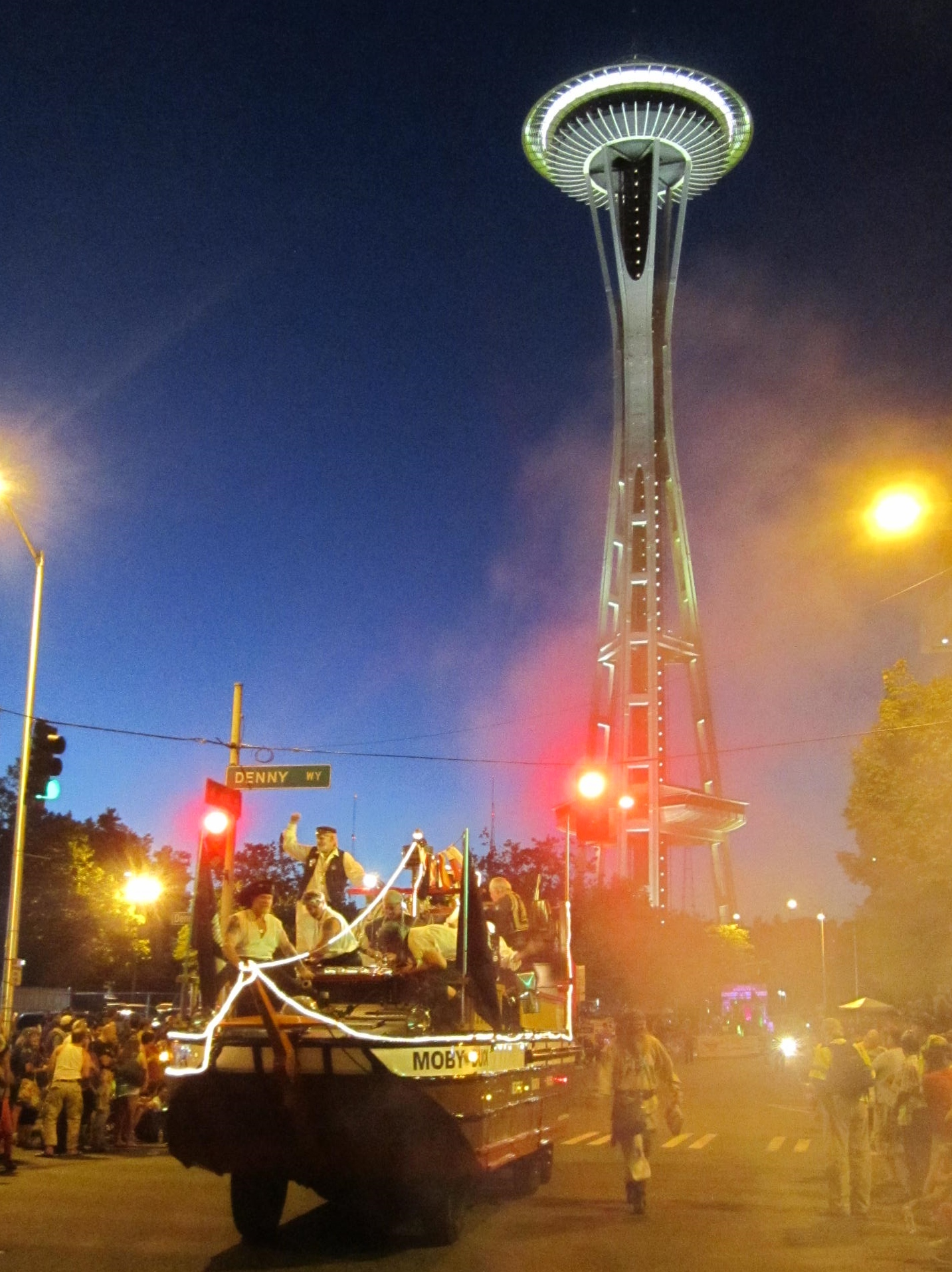
Seafair Pirates Moby Duck at the Torchlight Parade with Seattle's landmark Space Needle in the background (2013)

Another aspect of Seafair is the involvement of the Seafair Pirates, an organization that works year-round entertaining children in hospitals and performing other acts of community service including extensive fundraising. However, the pirates also usually perform loud—occasionally offensive—antics at Seafair (in an attempt to live up to their name) that cause perennial objection to their prominent involvement in the festivities. Despite this reputation, most people who enjoy Seafair see them as an essential part of the event.

=== Seafair Clowns ===
The Seafair Clowns have been part of Seafair since the 1950s, but became a nonprofit organization in 2015. The Clowns formed out of Seattle University's Graduates Club. Their stated mission is to spread joy by participating in events and performing visits. They visit nursing homes and hospitals during Seafair, while also appearing at festival events.

== Critiques ==
Although Seafair celebrations are varied and aimed at different audiences, the Blue Angels airshow draws criticism from some residents for its glorification of war, use of fossil fuel, and impact on the climate. In 2023, about half of the respondents to a survey sent to readers of the South Seattle Emerald, a local, progressive-leaning news website for South Seattle, where the festival takes place, responded that they, "hated" Seafair. In 2025, a billboard reading "Say no to the Blue Angles," and that the airshow is "too loud," triggers "war trauma," and causes "pollution," was unveiled in the Seattle neighborhood of Rainer Beach by the group Airshow Climate Action.

== Seafair royalty ==
When Seafair began in 1950, the organizers annually selected a "royal court" to serve as ceremonial heads of the festival. Two men were chosen from the 101 Club, a private business association within the Washington Athletic Club, to be King Neptune and the prime minister of Seafair. 20 women competed as princesses in a beauty pageant to become Queen of the Seas. Generally, each neighborhood chose a princess, from young women around 18 years old. In 1971, Callie Lynn Garcia won the pageant, becoming the first Hispanic woman to win the queenhood. The next year, the Seafair Queen was renamed to Miss Seafair, in part due to the influence of the women's rights movement. Galen Motin won the pageant in 1974, becoming the first black woman to win. In 1978, the prime minister selection pool expanded from the 101 Club to five groups. In 1980, the Miss Seafair program expanded to include a scholarship.

In 2000, the prime minister was replaced by Queen Alcyone, and the king and queen selection criteria was reoriented toward philanthropy and civic leadership. Over the 2000s, some longtime activists, rather than 101 Club members, were chosen as King Neptune. This included Roberto Maestas, Samuel B. McKinney, and Bob Santos. In 2019, the Miss Seafair pageant changed its judging guidelines to focus on academics, public speaking, and community service, with universities nominating contestants. Miss Seafair was replaced with the Seafair Community Hero in 2025, designed to honor adults who are emerging leaders.
