= Dode (steamboat) =

Historical steamboat in United States

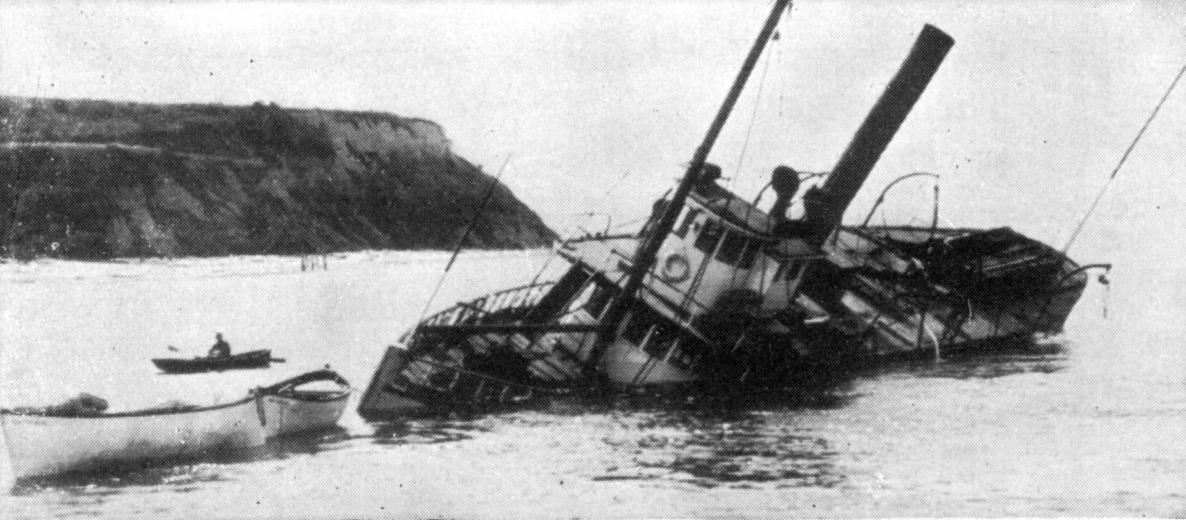
- Dode wrecked 1910.

History
- Name: Dode
- In service: 1898
- Identification: US registry #81534
- Fate: 1910 Sunk in Hood Canal

General characteristics
- Type: inland steamboat
- Tonnage: 215 gross; 135 regist.
- Length: 98.8 ft (30.11 m)
- Beam: 21.6 ft (6.58 m)
- Depth: 7.9 ft (2.41 m) depth of hold
- Installed power: steam engine 135 indicated horsepower
- Crew: twelve (12)

Dode was a steamboat that ran on Hood Canal and Puget Sound from 1898 to 1900.

== Construction ==
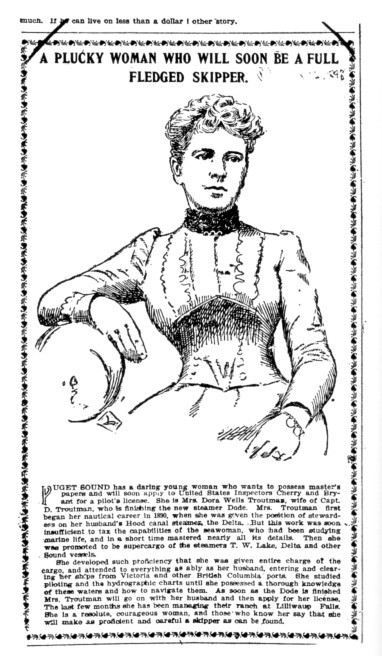
Capt. Dora Wells Troutman

Dode was originally the schooner William J. Bryant. Prior to construction as the Dode, the Bryant had been one of a flotilla of Gold Rush ships sent to Alaska. Most of the vessels were older, some had been pulled off mud flats and given a paint job, which led a newspaper of the time to call them "floating coffins."

In 1898, following return from Alaska, the Bryant was rebuilt into a propeller steamer for Capt Dan Troutman's Hood Canal service. The rebuilt vessel was named Dode after his nickname for his wife, Dora Wells Troutman, who was also a licensed captain. The Troutmans owned a farm at the small Hood Canal town of Lilliwaup. Captain Dan Troutman is reported to have mysteriously disappeared in 1899, forcing Dora Troutman to take over full management the Dode.

== Hood Canal route ==
By 1900, Dode was the only boat on the Hood Canal route, which started at Seattle and included landings at Kingston, Port Gamble, Seabeck, Brinnon, Holly, Dewatto, Lilliwaup Falls, Hoodsport and Union City. Dode typically left Pier 3 (now Pier 54) on a Tuesday, made all the stops on the run on that day, and then returned on the same route the next day to Seattle.

== Transfer to Bellingham interests ==
In 1902, Captain C.E. Curtis acquired Dode, with plans to run the vessel with another steamer, the Willapa, which Curtis had acquired from the Canadian Pacific steamship service. Curtis, doing business as the Bellingham Bay Transportation Company, renamed Willapa as Bellingham. During 1903, the rapidly growing Puget Sound Navigation Co. acquired Bellingham Transportation Company, but Dode and Willapa did not go to PSN operational control until the spring of 1904.

== Collision and grounding ==
On December 6, 1903, in heavy fog, Willapa, by then renamed Bellingham, was towing Dode to Whatcom for repairs, the vessels still being run by the Bellingham Bay company. The fast steamer Flyer pulled away from the Seattle dock en route to Tacoma and five minutes later Bellingham collided with Flyer. Dode, under tow and unable to maneuver, also collided with Flyer. Flyer was badly, but not irreparably damaged. No one was injured. Flyer's passengers were taken off by boats from nearby vessels. Shortly after Dode was taken over by PSN, the company was hit by a seaman's strike. The workers, who were seeking pay of $45 per month, shut down operation of all the company's boats for a while, but in the end, they obtained their raise and returned to work.

In 1904, with PSN now fully in control of the Bellingham company's boats, Dode was placed on routes connecting the various lumber company ports. On May 4, 1907, while proceeding in a heavy fog, Dode ran aground on Marrowstone Island near Fort Flagler. This proved to be not serious, as Dode was gotten off with only minor damage.

== Loss ==
On July 20, 1910, Dode was lost permanently, striking a rock and sinking, again off Marrowstone Island.
