= Waialeale (steamboat) =

American steamboat built in 1884

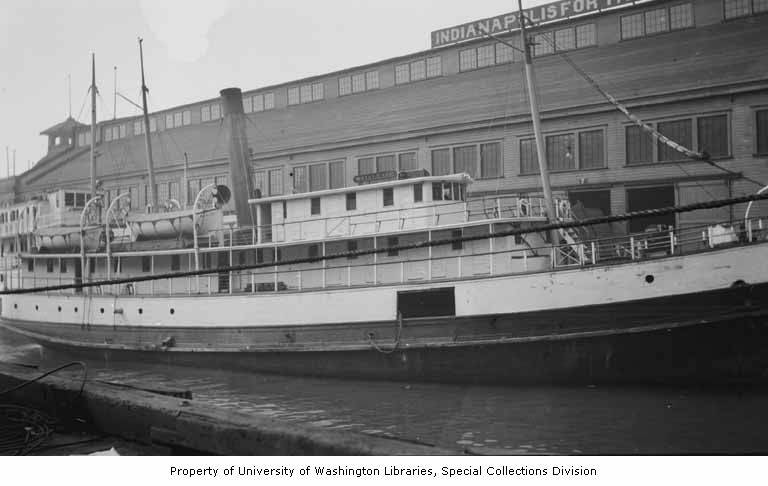

History
- Name: Waialeale
- Route: Tacoma-Vancouver
- Builder: Hall Brothers
- In service: 1884-1927
- Fate: Dismantled in Seattle, Washington

General characteristics
- Type: Inland steamboat
- Installed power: steam engine
- Propulsion: propeller

The Hawaiian schooner Waialeale (pronounced Wye-Ally-Ally) operated in the early 1900s as part of the Puget Sound Mosquito Fleet. She was known colloquially as "Weary Willy".

== Construction & Operations ==
Waialeale was built in 1884 by the Hall Brothers at Port Blakely. In 1905 the vessel was brought to Puget Sound by Cary Cook of Cook & Company and operated as a propeller steamer on the Tacoma-Vancouver run, replacing the Mainlander. In 1907 she was taken over by the Puget Sound Navigation Company. She was dismantled in Seattle in 1927.
