= Virginia V =

American commercial steamship

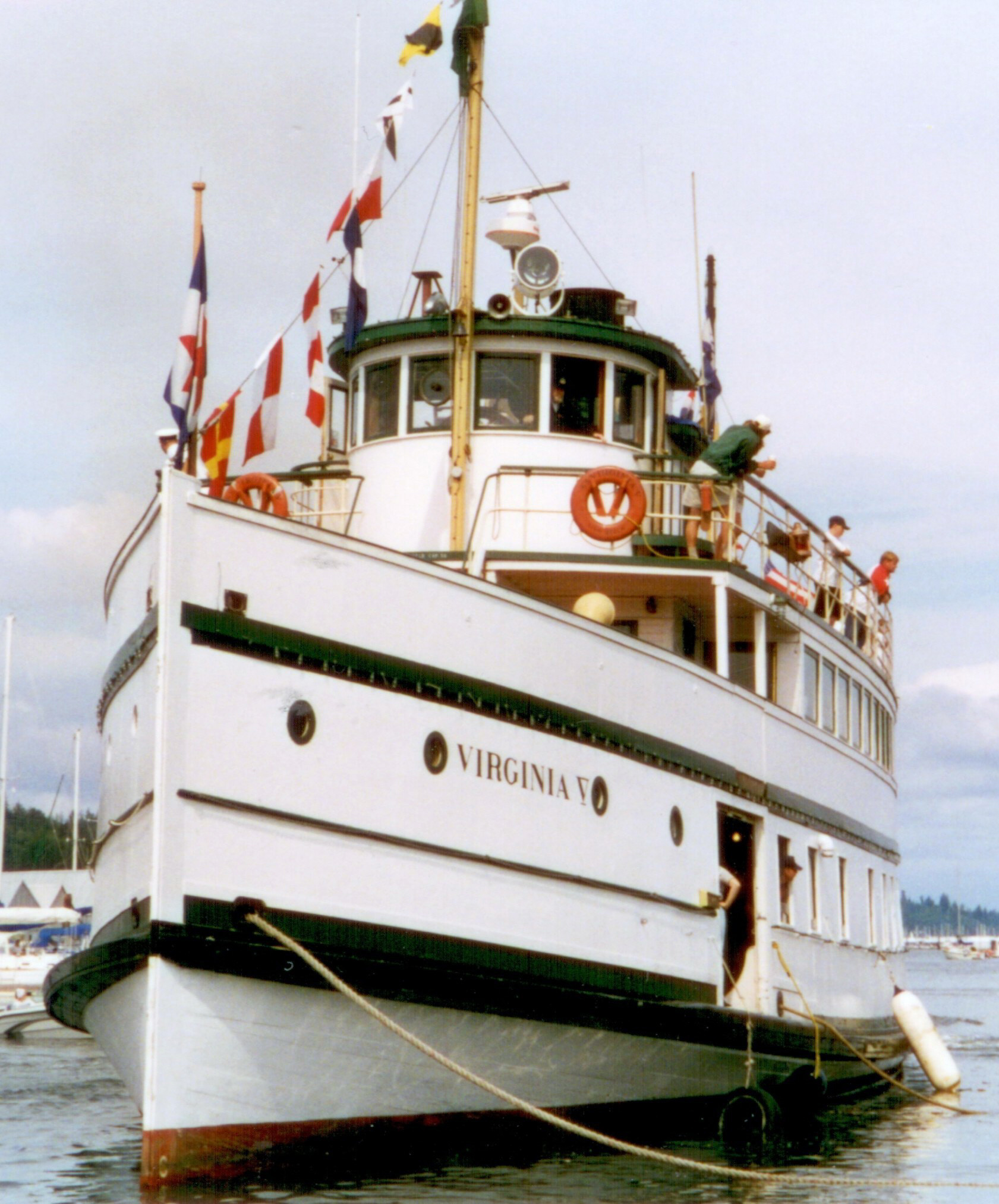
- Virginia V, at Olympia, Washington, 4 July 1996

History

United States
- Name: Virginia V
- Owner: West Pass Transportation Company
- Operator: West Pass Transportation Company
- Route: West Pass Route
- Builder: Anderson & Company
- Laid down: October 1921
- Launched: 9 March 1922
- Completed: June 1922
- Maiden voyage: 11 June 1922
- In service: 11 June 1922
- Identification: Official Number: 222170; Callsign: WDD9410; MMSI number: 367311060
- Nickname(s): Virginia Vee
- Status: Operational Museum Ship

General characteristics
- Type: Passenger steamer
- Tonnage: 99 Gross, 67 Net
- Displacement: Approximately 150 tons
- Length: 125 ft (38 m) on deck
- Beam: 24 feet (7.3 m)
- Draft: 8 feet (2.4 m)
- Decks: 4
- Installed power: 400 hp (300 kW) triple-expansion steam engine
- Speed: 16.2 kn (30.0 km/h; 18.6 mph)
- Crew: 7
- Virginia V (steamer)
- U.S. National Register of Historic Places
- U.S. National Historic Landmark
- Seattle Landmark
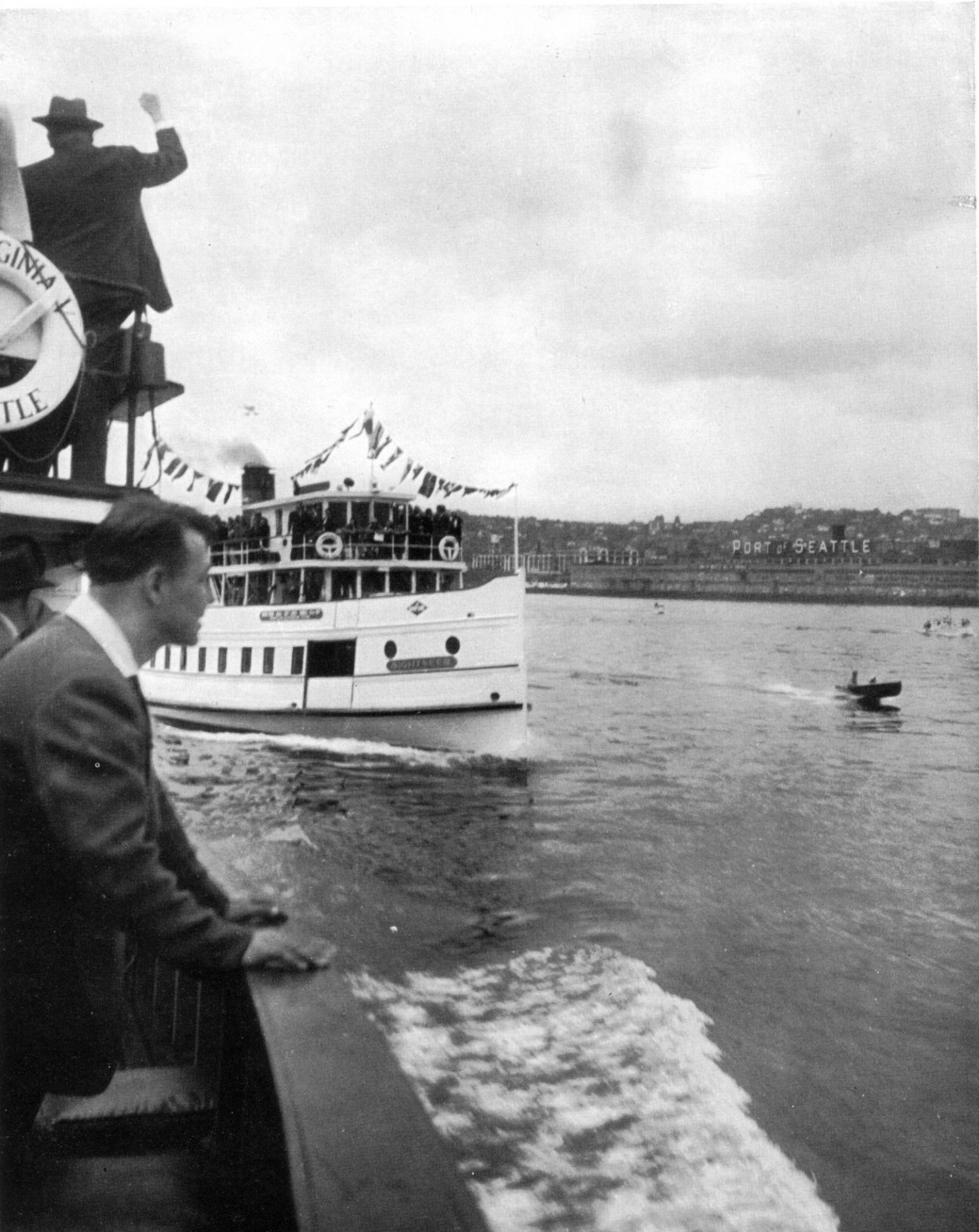
- Virginia V leading Sightseer, May 22, 1948.

- Location within Washington (state)
- Location: 860 Terry Avenue North, Seattle, WA 98109
- Coordinates: 47°37′41.8″N 122°20′12.5″W
- Built: 1922
- Architect: Anderson & Co., Matthew Anderson
- NRHP reference No.: 73001875

Significant dates
- Added to NRHP: 24 April 1973
- Designated NHL: 5 October 1992
- Designated SEATL: March 7, 1977

The steamship Virginia V is the last operational example of a Puget Sound Mosquito Fleet steamer. She was once part of a large fleet of small passenger and freight carrying ships that linked the islands and ports of Puget Sound in Washington state in the late 19th and early 20th centuries. She is a Seattle landmark and a National Historic Landmark.

Her original route was between the cities of Tacoma and Seattle, along the West Pass (also known as Colvos Passage) between Vashon Island and the Kitsap Peninsula.

Today the ship operates from Heritage Wharf at Lake Union Park in Seattle.

== History ==
=== West Pass Transportation Company ===
Around the turn of the 20th century outlying communities all over Puget Sound, particularly those on the many islands, were dependent on small boats and ships for delivering goods and basic transportation. The primary shipping lane from Seattle to Tacoma was along the east side of Vashon Island.

Farmers and business people along Colvos Passage in Kitsap County and on the west side of Vashon Island were very dissatisfied with the unreliable boat service they received. In 1910 Captain Nelse "Nels" Christensen and John Holm formed the West Pass Transportation Company and purchased their own boat to serve this part of the island.

The boat they bought was Virginia Merrill, a 54-foot (16 m) long gasoline-powered tug. She was renamed simply Virginia and converted for use as a small ferry.

=== The Virginia boats ===
Virginia was replaced in 1912 with Virginia II, a 77-foot (23 m) long ship propelled by a 110 hp (82 kW) Corliss gasoline engine. In 1914 the West Pass Transportation Company purchased the 92-foot (28 m) steam ship Typhoon and renamed her Virginia III. In 1918 they purchased the 98-foot (30 m) steam ship Tyrus, and in 1920 they renamed her Virginia IV and put her on the West Pass route.

=== Construction ===
In 1921, Anderson & Company of Maplewood, Washington, began construction of Virginia V. The ship was built of local old-growth fir. She was launched 9 March 1922, and towed to downtown Seattle for the installation of her engine and steam plant. In Seattle the engine was removed from Virginia IV and installed in Virginia V. On 11 June 1922, Virginia V made her maiden voyage from Elliott Bay in Seattle to Tacoma down the West Pass. She continued to make this voyage nearly every day until 1938.

=== Storm of 1934 ===
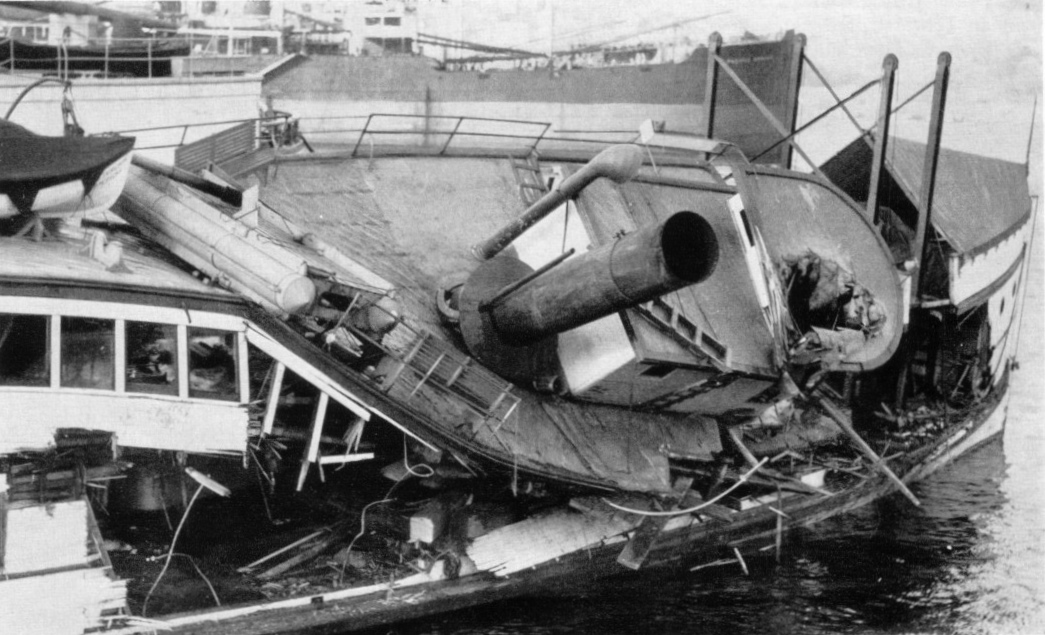
Heavy damage to Virginia V caused by October 1934 storm

On 21 October 1934, a severe Pacific storm swept through the Puget Sound. Virginia V was attempting to dock at Olalla, Washington, when the brunt of the storm hit. The powerful winds pushed the ship against the dock as the waves pounded the ship into the pilings. The result was the near destruction of the upper decks. The ship was re-built at the Lake Washington Shipyard at Houghton, near modern-day Kirkland, Washington. She was returned to service on 5 December 1934.

=== Camp Sealth and the Camp Fire Girls ===
Each summer from 1922 to 1970 (with a few interruptions around World War II) Virginia V carried girls to and from Seattle to Camp Sealth on Vashon Island for the Camp Fire Girls. Thousands of women in the Northwest recall a ride on Virginia Vee (as she was affectionately called) as the beginning of a camping adventure.

=== Columbia River service and bankruptcy ===
The West Pass Transportation Company went out of business in 1942. Virginia V, which had been operating for a while on the Seattle-Fort Worden run, was transferred to the Columbia River, where for a brief time she was placed on the Portland-Astoria run, thus becoming the last scheduled passenger vessel running on both Puget Sound and the Columbia River. Her Columbia River career was unsuccessful. Her owners were unable to pay her crew and she was libeled (legally seized for debts owed) and sold at Vancouver, Washington by the U.S. Marshals to pay her owner's debts. Virginia V was purchased by O.H. "Doc" Freeman and Joe Boles of Seattle. They resold the vessel to Jack Katz and Captain Howell Parker less than a year later.

=== Captain Howell Parker and The Great Steamboat Race ===
Captain Parker operated Virginia V carrying war workers between Poulsbo, Washington, and the Keyport Naval Torpedo Station with his wife Mary as steward and purser. After the end of World War II, the Parkers continued to operate her as an excursion vessel all around Puget Sound. In 1948 the Puget Sound Maritime Historical Society (PSMHS) was formed to preserve the Northwest's marine history. As a publicity event, the PSMHS sponsored a race between Virginia V and a similar ship, Grayline Sightseer (formerly Vashona) to be held on National Maritime Day. The Great Steamboat Race began on May 22 at 2PM. At the end of a 5-mile (8.0 km) course that ran across the Seattle waterfront, Virginia V won the race by a small margin.

=== Puget Sound Excursion Lines ===
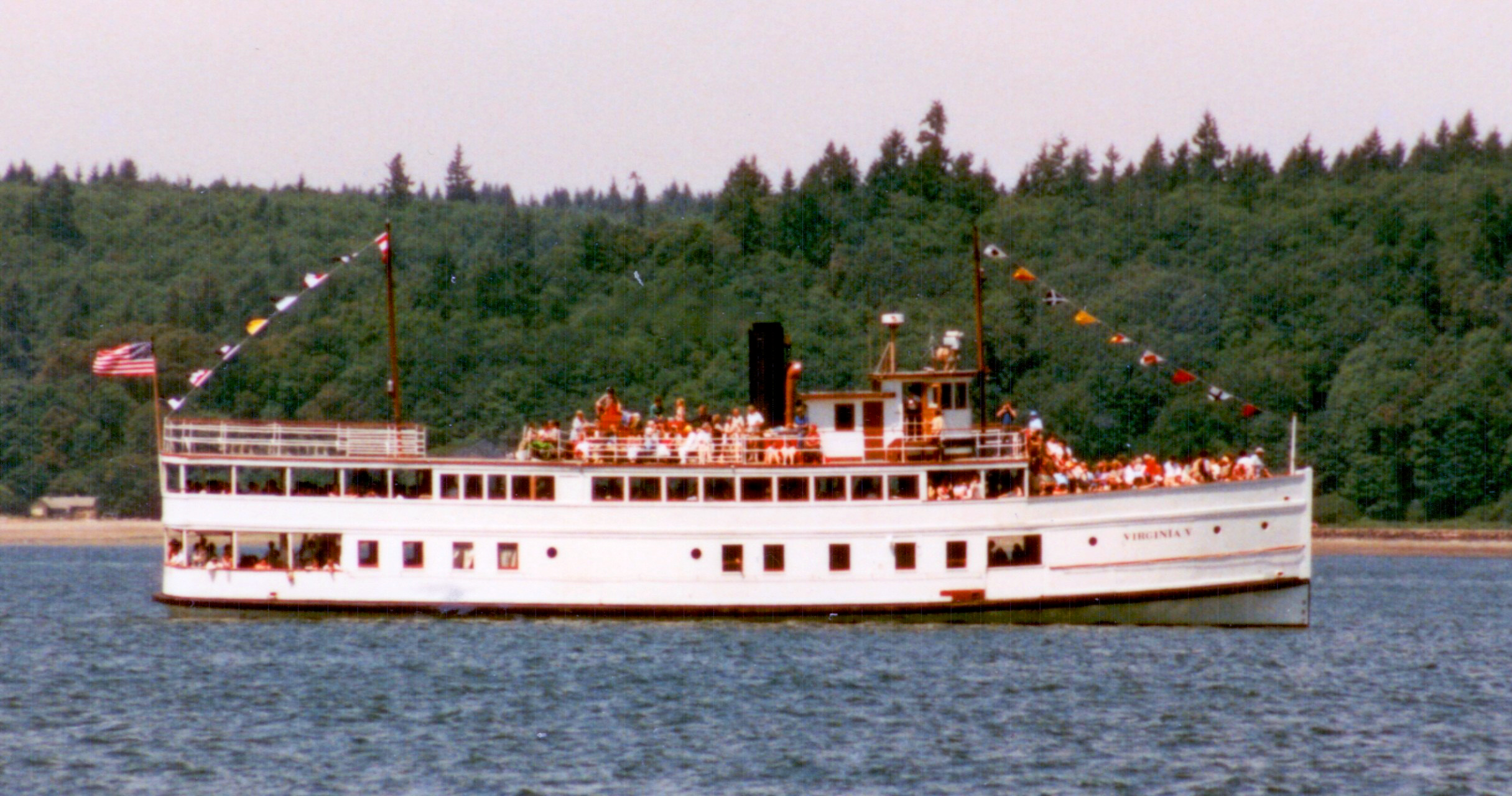
Virginia V, on Puget Sound, about June, 1983

In 1954 Virginia V was sold to Captain Phillip Luther of Puget Sound Excursion Lines. Captain Luther sold her to Charles McMahon in 1956. McMahon extensively refurbished Virginia V, and then continued to operate her as a commercial excursion vessel around Puget Sound. In 1958 James F. "Cy" Devenny purchased controlling interest in Puget Sound Excursion Company and took over operation of Virginia V along with several other small vessels. Among these was the McNeil Island federal prison tender J.E. Overlade (ex Arcadia), built in 1928, herself one of the last survivors of the Mosquito Fleet. Devenny renamed her Virginia VI to match her more famous running mate.

=== Northwest Steamship Company ===
In 1968 a group of steamboat enthusiasts formed the Northwest Steamship Company, and raised the funds to buy Virginia V from Puget Sound Excursion Company. The ship was placed on the National Registry of Historic Sites in 1973, but despite her recognition as historically significant, it was increasingly difficult for her owners to maintain her as a commercial venture.

=== Steamer Virginia V Foundation ===
In 1976 the non-profit Steamer Virginia V Foundation was formed to preserve Virginia V. The Foundation acquired her on 30 September 1980, for $127,000.

=== Major restoration 1995–2001 ===
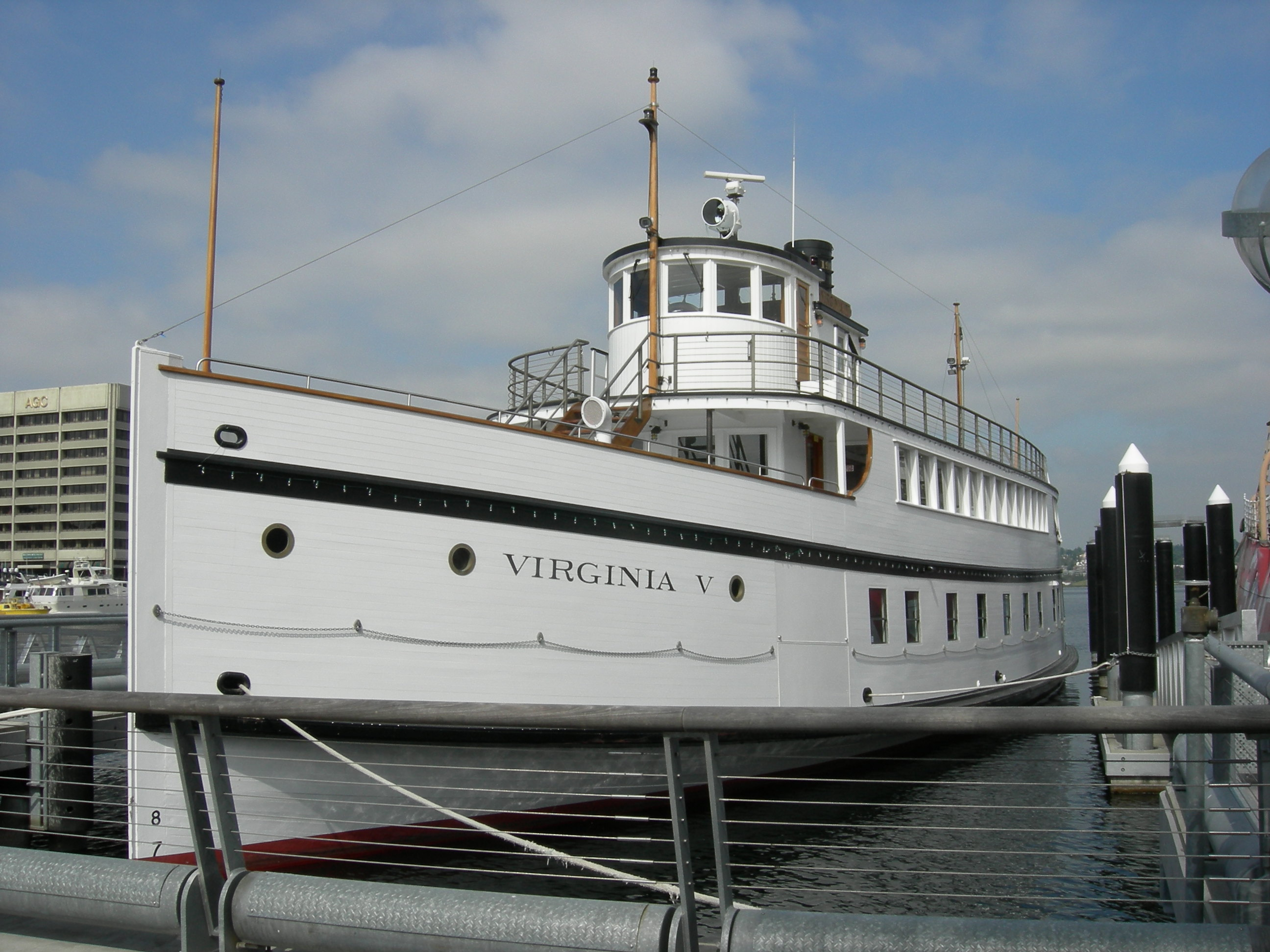
Virginia V, September 2007

In 2002, the Foundation was able to put Virginia V back in service after a six-year, $6.5 million stem-to-stern restoration project. It included a rebuild of the steam engine, construction of a new boiler and rebuild of the superstructure using traditional tongue and groove fir planking. The Foundation was honored in 2001 with the Washington State Historical Society's "David Douglas Award" for the restoration work completed to-date.

=== Present day ===
Since 2002 the Virginia V has been providing public excursions, private charters, and visits to local maritime festivals throughout Puget Sound.

== Engine and boiler ==
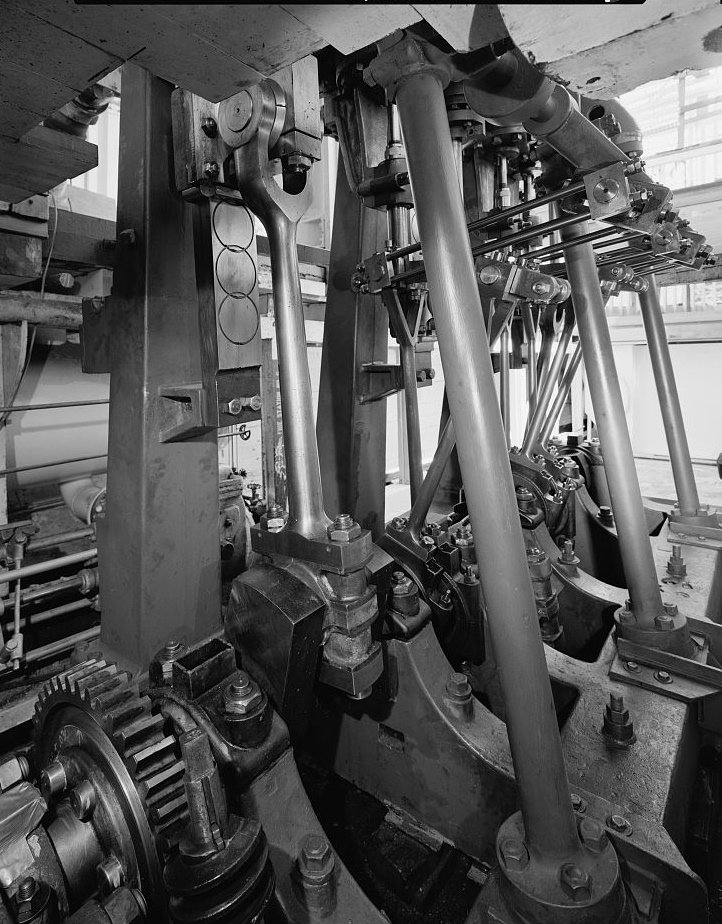
Triple-expansion steam engine of the Virginia V

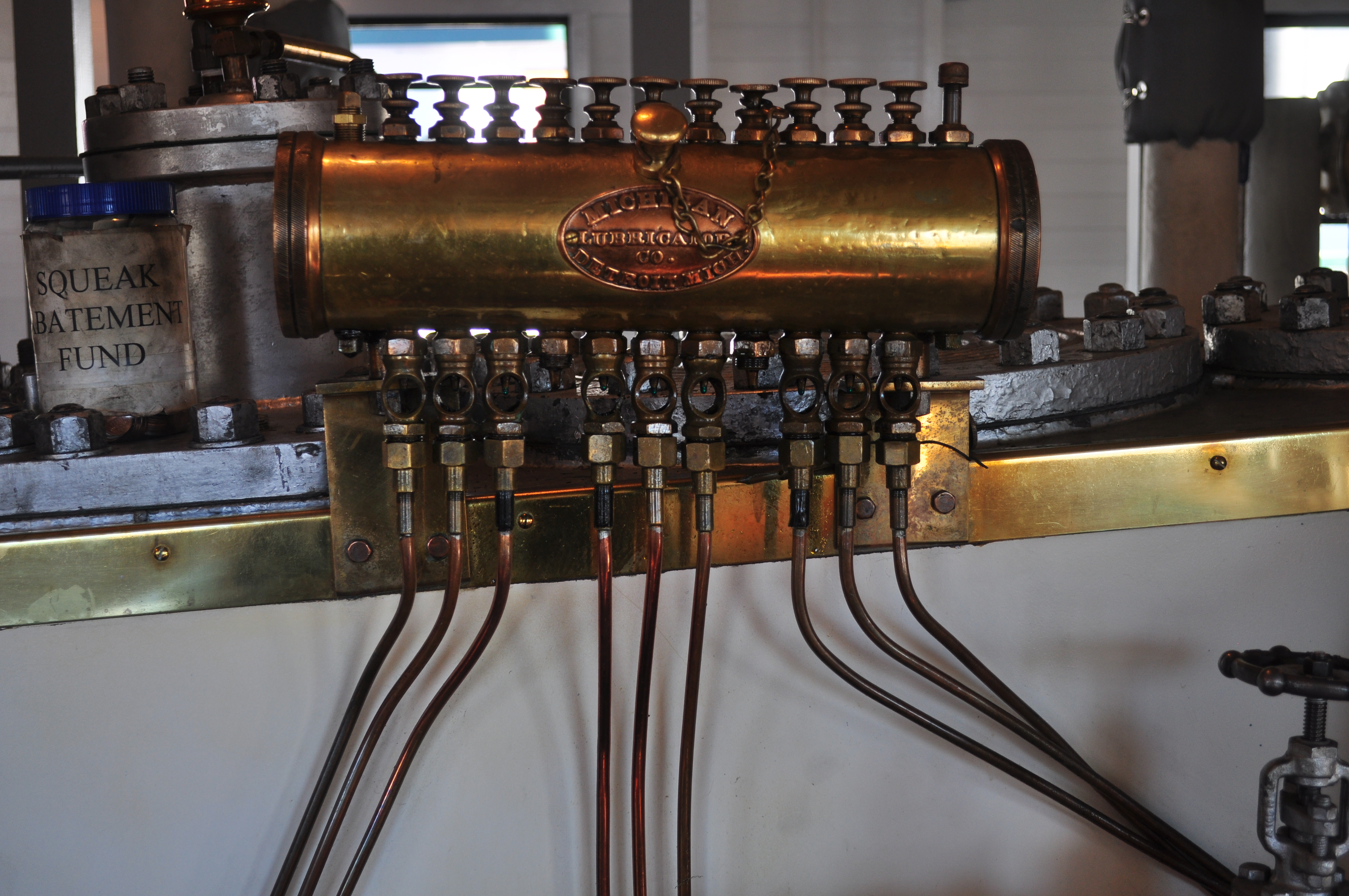
Drip lubricator

The triple-expansion, double-acting, reciprocating steam engine is the original, installed in 1922 when it was taken from Virginia IV (formerly Tyrus). The parts were cast in 1904 at the Heffernan Engine Works in downtown Seattle as one of two identical engines built for the Army. The first engine was assembled and installed in the US Army Quartermaster Steamer Evan Thomas. Virginia V's engine was assembled and installed in Tyrus in 1907.

- Indicated Horsepower: 400 horsepower (300 kW)
- Maximum RPM: Approximately 200
- Cylinder Bore (Diameter): 10.5 inches (270 mm), 16.75 inches (425 mm), and 28.5 inches (720 mm) (HP, IP, and LP respectively)
- Stroke: 18 inches (460 mm)

The original Stoddert oil-fired, water-tube boiler was replaced in 2000 with a new Babcock & Wilcox oil-fired water-tube boiler of similar configuration.

Virginia V always used oil as her fuel. The ship originally burned heavy bunker fuel. She was converted to burn #2 Diesel fuel in 2002.

In recent years, the engine has developed a noise, referred to as "The Squeak". While the cause of this noise is not definitively known, it is presumed to come from the low pressure valve. There are no physical indications of scuffing, galling, or damage to components indicating a metal-to-metal contact. The squeak is more pronounced as the engine warms up, and goes away as the engine speed increases. The problem has so vexed the engineers that they have started a tongue-in-cheek fund, whereby visitors are required to donate $1 to the repair fund if they wish to talk to an engineer about it. (This fund may also be diverted to a beer fund, at the discretion of the engineer.)

- Working Pressure: 200 pounds per square inch (1,400 kPa)
- Capacity: 10,000 lb (4,500 kg) per hour of steam
- Fuel: #2 Diesel Oil
- Fuel Consumption: Approximately 20–50 US gallons (80–200 L) per hour

== See also ==
- Historic preservation
- List of National Historic Landmarks in Washington (state)
- List of U.S. National Historic Landmark ships, shipwrecks, and shipyards
- List of Puget Sound steamboats
