= William Trimble =

William Trimble may refer to:

- William A. Trimble (1786–1821), American politician from Ohio
- William C. Trimble (died 1996), American diplomat
- William P. Trimble (1863-1943), American attorney and businessman
