= Gregg Olsen =

American novelist (born 1959)

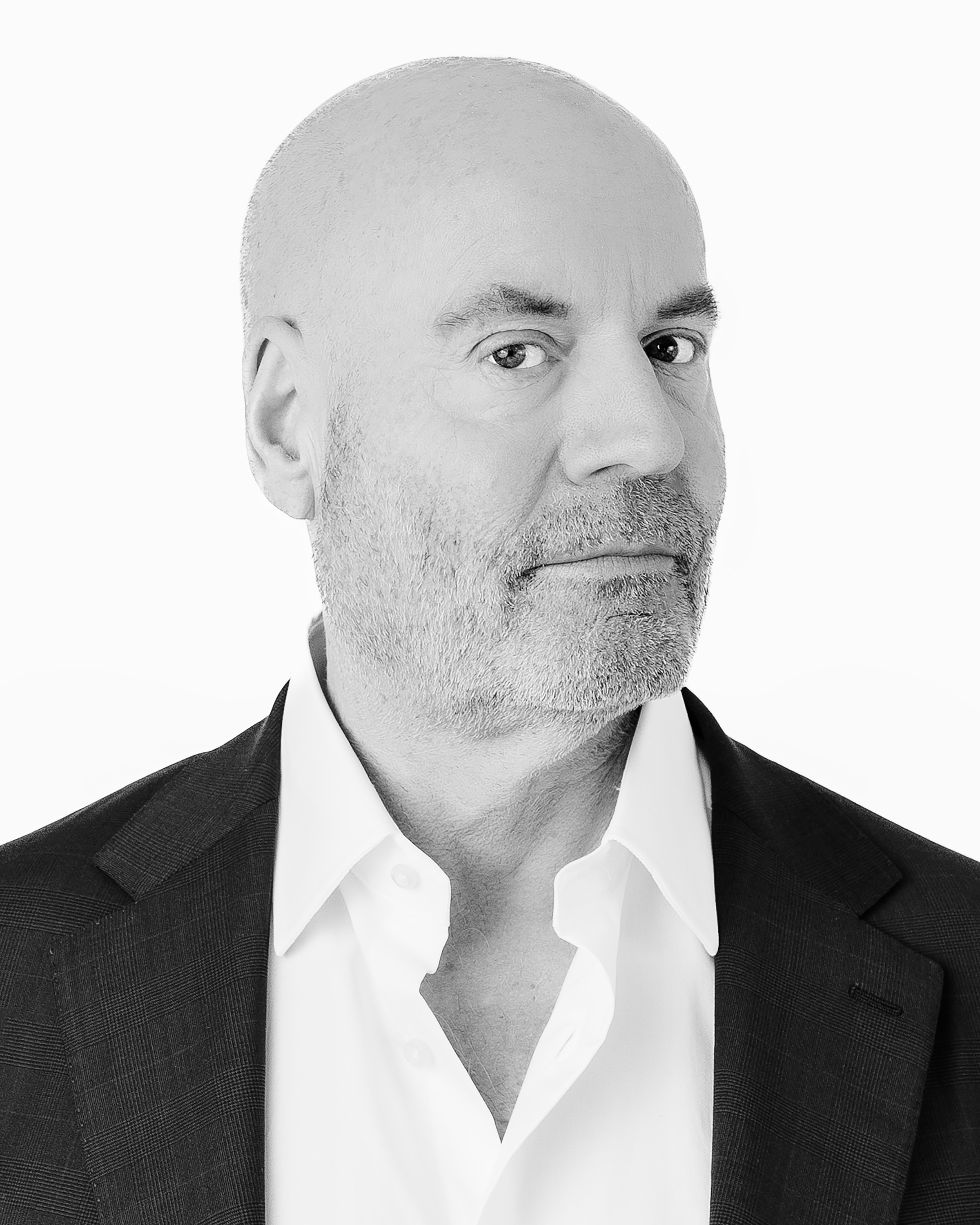
- Born: March 5, 1959 (age 67); Seattle, Washington, U.S.
- Occupation: Novelist
- Writing career
- Genres: True crime, thriller
- Website: greggolsen.com notorioususa.com

Gregg Olsen (born March 5, 1959) is an American author best known for his works in the true crime and thriller genres.

== Early life and education ==
Olsen was born in Seattle, Washington and grew up in the Pacific Northwest. He earned a journalism degree from Western Washington University, where he served as editor of Klipsun Magazine and managing editor of the university newspaper, The Western Front. He published his first book in 1990.

== Career ==
=== Critical Assessment ===
His books have appeared on bestseller lists, including The New York Times, USA Today, and The Wall Street Journal.

Olsen has also received acclaim for his writing in the true crime and crime fiction genres. The Deep Dark: Disaster and Redemption in America's Richest Silver Mine was selected as Idaho Book of the Year in 2006 by the Idaho Libraries Association. It was also a finalist for a Spur Award for best contemporary historical nonfiction book by the Western Writers of America. In 2007, The Deep Dark was also selected by Boise State University as its first-year read for incoming freshmen. The Washington State Library selected Olsen's Young Adult crime novel, Envy, to represent the state at the National Book Festival in Washington, D.C. Starvation Heights was selected by the Washington State Library and the Washington Secretary of State for its annual Everybody Reads literary program for books that contribute to the culture of the state. In 2018, The Boy She Left Behind was a finalist for the International Thriller Writers Thriller Award for best young adult novel. In 2025, The Amish Wife was a nominee for the Best Fact Crime Edgar Award given by the Mystery Writers of America. The following year, 2026, Out of the Woods was nominated in the same category. Judges for the annual national CrimeCon convention selected Out of the Woods as a finalist for the Clue Award in May 2026.

=== Adaptations ===
Starvation Heights was adapted for the stage by playwright Ginny Foster, which debuted at the National New Play Festival in July 2008. The title was also optioned for film in 2009 by Pulitzer Prize winner and screenwriter Tracy Letts.

A Killing in Amish Country was the basis for the 2023 Lifetime film, Amish Stud: The Eli Weaver Story.

=== Appearances ===
Olsen was a featured speaker or panelist at the American Bookseller’s Association and the American Library Association conventions in Seattle and Philadelphia. Internationally, he has appeared as a presenter and panelist at the Hong Kong Literary Festival and the Cheltenham Literary Festival in the United Kingdom.

== Personal life ==
Olsen and his wife, Claudia, a graphic designer, live in rural Olalla, Washington. The family owns and operates a general store, Olalla Bay Market and Landing, which features a museum that documents the story told in the author’s book, Starvation Heights.

== Bibliography ==
=== Nonfiction ===
- Abandoned Prayers: An Incredible True Story of Murder, Obsession, and Amish Secrets (1990);
- Bitter Almonds: Mothers, Daughters and the Seattle Cyanide Murders (1993); republished as American Mother (2022);
- Starvation Heights: A True Story of Murder and Malice in the Woods of the Pacific Northwest (1997);
- The Confessions of an American Black Widow: The Shocking True Story of a Preacher's Wife Turned Killer (1998), republished as American Black Widow (2023);
- If Loving You Is Wrong: The Shocking True Story of Mary Kay Letourneau (1999);
- The Deep Dark: Disaster and Redemption in America’s Richest Silver Mine (2005);
- Mockingbird: A Mother, a Child, a Tragedy (2007); republished as Cruel Deception (2010);
- A Twisted Faith: A Minister’s Obsession and the Murder that Destroyed a Church (2010);
- If I Can’t Have You: Susan Powell, Her Mysterious Disappearance, and the Murder of Her Children (2014);
- A Killing in Amish Country: Sex, Betrayal, and a Cold-Blooded Murder (2016);
- If You Tell: A True Story of Murder, Family Secrets, and the Unbreakable Bond of Sisterhood (2019);
- The Amish Wife: Unraveling the Lies, Secrets, and Conspiracy That Let a Killer Go Free (2024);
- Out of the Woods: A Girl, a Killer, and a Lifelong Struggle to Find the Way Home (2025);
- By the River’s Edge: A True Story of Identity and Serial Murder (2026);
- The Back Bedroom: A True Story of Exorcism and Murder (2026).

=== Fiction ===
==== Standalone novels ====
- A Wicked Snow (2007) (ISBN 0786048468)
- Fear Collector (2013) (ISBN 1780332904)
- Shocking True Story (2013) (ISBN 1489502793)
- The Last Thing She Ever Did (2018) (ISBN 1683248414)
- Lying Next to Me (2019) (ISBN 1542040515)
- The Hive (2021) (ISBN 978-1542016469)
- I Know Where You Live (2023) (ISBN 978-1542016476)

==== Series and sequels ====
===== Sheriff’s Detective Emily Kenyon =====
- A Cold Dark Place (2008) (ISBN 1988812712)
- Heart of Ice (2009) (ISBN 1607517620)

==== Empty Coffin, aka Port Gamble Chronicles ====
- Envy (2011) (ISBN 1402789572)
- Betrayal (2012) (ISBN 1402789580)

===== Forensic Pathologist Birdy Waterman and Detective Kendall Stark =====
- Victim Six (2010) (ISBN 1616641770)
- Closer Than Blood (2011) (ISBN 1611295610)
- The Bone Box (2012) (ASIN B0063KB2OO)
- The Girl in the Woods (2014) (ISBN 1629532800)
- Now That She's Gone (2015) (ISBN 147210949X)
- Just Try to Stop Me (2016) (ISBN 0786029986)

===== Detective Nicole Foster =====
- The Sound of Rain (2016) (ISBN 1503941965)
- The Weight of Silence (2017)

===== Vengeance Club =====
- The Girl on the Run (2014) (ISBN 1940610699)
- The Boy She Left Behind (2017) (ISBN 1943818312)

===== Detective Megan Carpenter =====
- Snow Creek (2019) (ISBN 978-1538706886)
- Water's Edge (2020) (ISBN 978-1838887445)
- Silent Ridge (2020) (ISBN 978-1800193116)
- Stillwater Island (2021) (ISBN 978-1800198357)
- Cougar Point (2024) (ISBN 978-1837904907)
- Final Victim (2025) (ISBN 978-1836183556)
