= L. E. Rader =

American politician

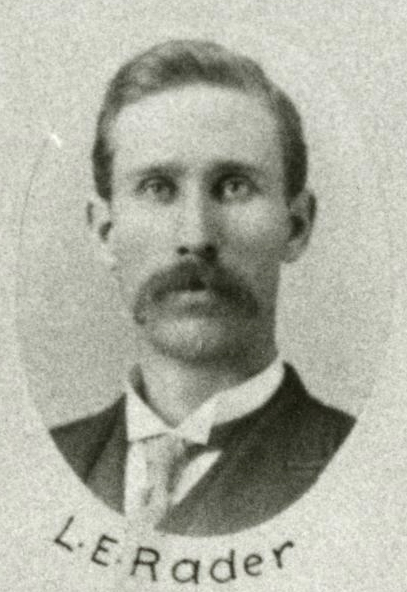
- Rader in 1895

Member of the Washington House of Representatives
- In office 1895–1897 (37th district); 1897–1899 (30th district)

Personal details
- Born: March 16, 1864 Hazel Dell, Illinois, United States
- Died: May 11, 1910 (aged 46) Seattle, Washington, United States
- Party: Populist

Lewis Emerson Rader, Sr. (March 16, 1864 – May 11, 1910) was an American politician in the state of Washington. He served in the Washington House of Representatives. In 1910, Rader was starved to death after a 29-day fast under the advice of the quack doctor Linda Burfield Hazzard for treatment of a stomach issue.
