= Maplewood, Washington =

Unincorporated community in Washington, US

Maplewood
- Unincorporated community
- Location within the state of Washington
- Coordinates: 47°22′45″N 122°34′07″W
- Country: United States
- State: Washington
- County: Pierce
- Elevation: 253 ft (77 m)
- Time zone: UTC-8 (Pacific (PST))
  - Summer (DST): UTC-7 (PDT)
- ZIP codes: 98332
- GNIS feature ID: 2585003

Maplewood is an unincorporated community in Pierce County, in the U.S. state of Washington. As of the 2020 census, Maplewood had a population of 5,469. It is located south of Olalla on Puget Sound's Colvos Passage near Crescent Lake. The ZIP Code for Maplewood is 98332.

== Demographics ==
Historical population
Census	Pop.	Note	%±
2010	5,138		—
2020	5,469		6.4%
U.S. Decennial Census; 2000 2010

Maplewood first appeared as a census designated place in the 2010 U.S. census.

=== Racial and ethnic composition ===
Maplewood CDP, Washington – Racial and ethnic composition Note: the US Census treats Hispanic/Latino as an ethnic category. This table excludes Latinos from the racial categories and assigns them to a separate category. Hispanics/Latinos may be of any race.
Race / Ethnicity (NH = Non-Hispanic)	Pop 2010	Pop 2020	% 2010	% 2020
White alone (NH)	4,595	4,578	89.43%	83.71%
Black or African American alone (NH)	23	42	0.45%	0.77%
Native American or Alaska Native alone (NH)	17	34	0.33%	0.62%
Asian alone (NH)	146	150	2.84%	2.74%
Native Hawaiian or Pacific Islander alone (NH)	7	16	0.14%	0.29%
Other race alone (NH)	3	56	0.06%	1.02%
Mixed race or Multiracial (NH)	163	375	3.17%	6.86%
Hispanic or Latino (any race)	184	218	3.58%	3.99%
Total	5,138	5,469	100.00%	100.00%
