= Ivar Haglund =

American singer

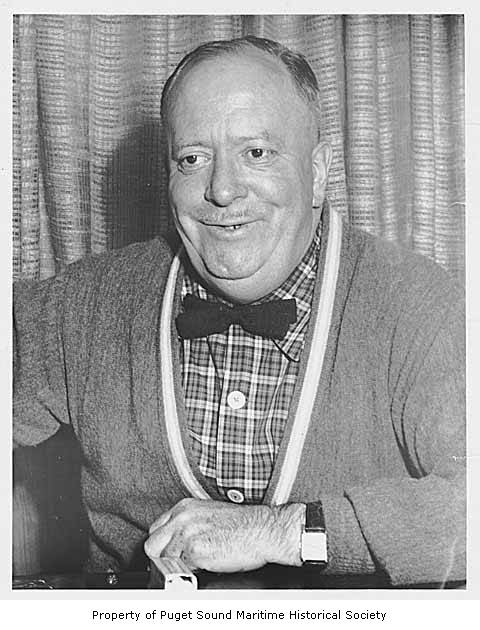
- Born: March 21, 1905; Seattle, Washington
- Died: January 30, 1985 (aged 79); Seattle, Washington
- Known for: Folksinger, restaurateur
- Title: "Flounder" of Ivar's; Port Commissioner of Seattle

Ivar Johan Haglund (March 21, 1905 – January 30, 1985) was a Seattle folk singer, restaurateur and the founder of Ivar's.

== Background ==
Ivar Johan Haglund was born in Seattle, Washington, the son of pioneers Johan Ivar Haglund, a Swedish immigrant and Daisy Hanson Haglund, daughter of Norwegian immigrants. His maternal grandparents had purchased Alki Point in 1869 from Seattle pioneer David Swinson Maynard. The house on the property, which is now located at 3045 64th Avenue SW in West Seattle, is considered to be the oldest house in Seattle. His mother died of starvation when he was only three on February 26, 1908, while under treatment by Linda Hazzard, a so-called fasting specialist. However, following autopsy, it was determined that his mother had been suffering from terminal stomach cancer, possibly for years, and that she would have died even without Hazzard's "treatment". The official cause of death was reported as stomach cancer. Ivar himself was treated by Hazzard several times after his mother's death, likely due to his father's belief that Hazzard's treatment had eased his late mother's suffering and extended her life.

Haglund “graduated from the University of Washington in 1928 with a degree as a stockbroker.”

== Career ==
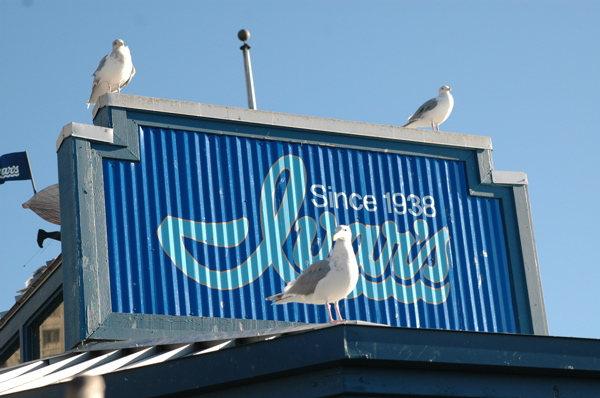
Ivar's Acres of Clams

In 1938, he opened Seattle's first aquarium along with a fish and chips counter on Pier 54. Friends who visited him included novelist Thomas Wolfe (1900–1938), one of whose last photographs was taken in the company of Haglund in July 1938. In 1946, Haglund opened a full restaurant on Pier 54, Ivar's Acres of Clams, which with the fish and chip counter survives to this day (although they have been thoroughly remodeled). He coined its motto, "Keep Clam." He expanded the fine dining and fish and chips restaurants into a regional chain. In 1965 he bought Pier 54. Ivar's Salmon House opened in 1971. The 1980s saw the addition of multiple Ivar's Fish Bars. Today, there are 24 Ivar's fast casual Seafood Bars, three Fish Bars, and three full-service restaurants: Ivar's Acres of Clams, Ivar's Salmon House and Ivar's Mukilteo Landing.

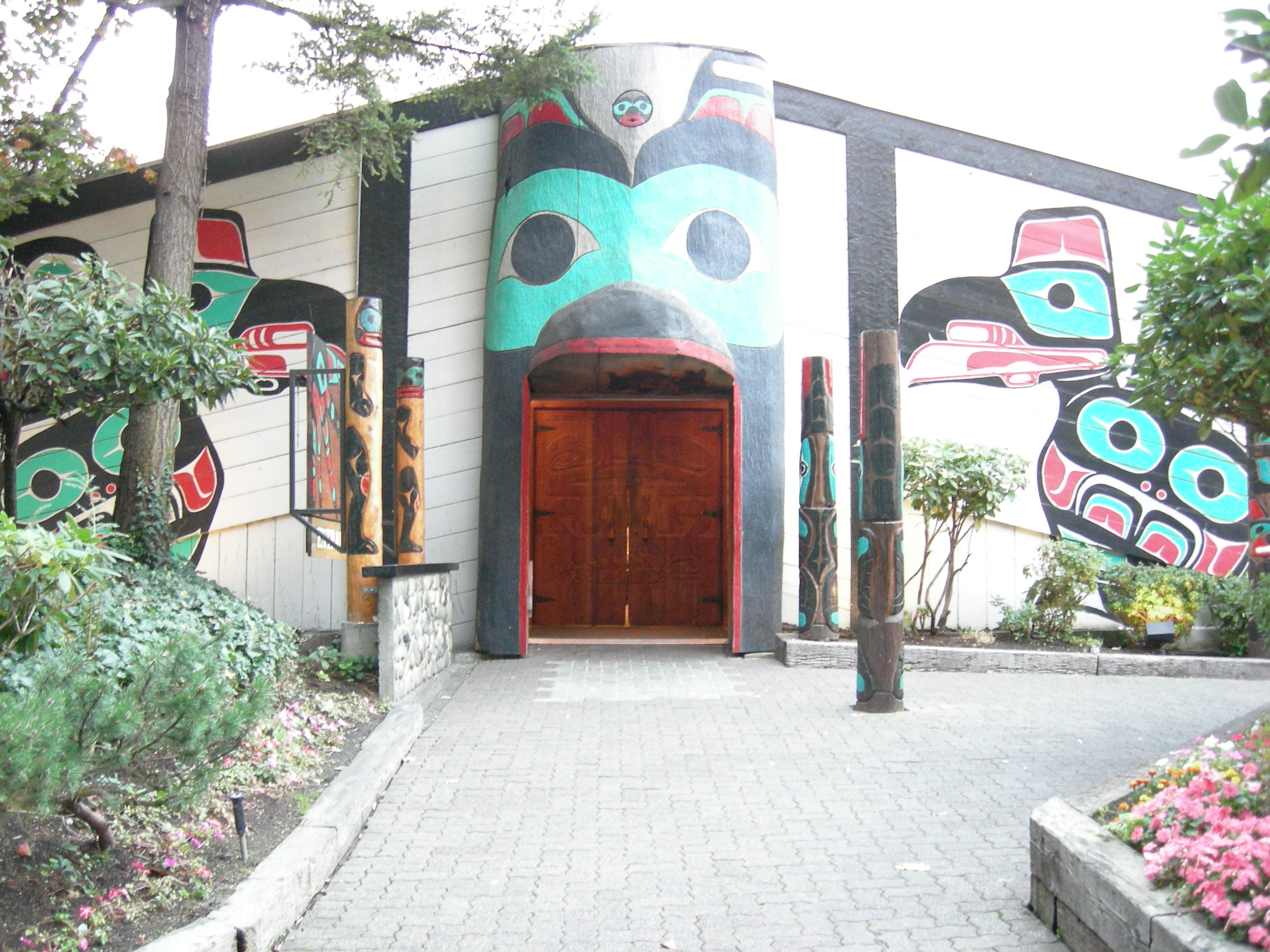
Main entrance of Ivar's Salmon House

After his neighbor on Pier 56 put up a sign reading "Don't Feed Sea Gulls, Health Regulation" in 1971, Haglund responded with his own sign encouraging customers to feed the seagulls. In 1976, Haglund bought the Smith Tower, a Seattle landmark that was once the tallest building in North America west of the Mississippi River. In 1983, he was elected port commissioner after filing as a prank. He died of a heart attack just over a year later. With no direct heirs, he left his estate principally to the University of Washington School of Business in support of the University Restaurant Program.

In 2009, the Ivar's restaurant company enlisted local historians to conspire in a hoax, in which historic billboards were placed underwater, ostensibly by Haglund before his death, and then "rediscovered."

== See also ==
- Ivar Feeding the Gulls (1988)
