= Linda Hazzard =

American quack, fraud, swindler and serial killer

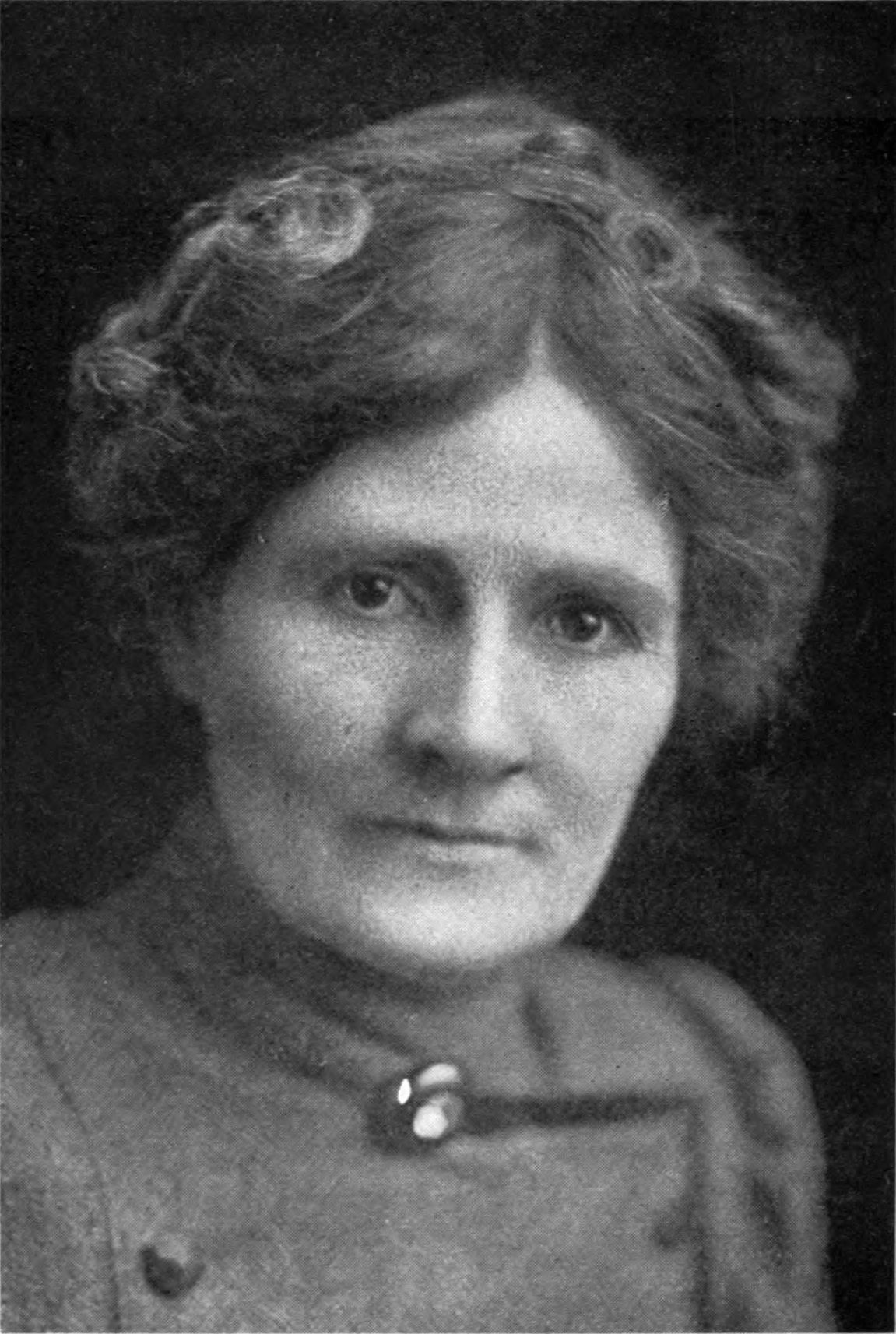
- Hazzard, 1912
- Born: Lynda Laura Burfield; December 18, 1867; Carver, Minnesota, U.S.
- Died: June 24, 1938 (aged 70)
- Cause of death: Starvation due to fasting
- Other names: Linda Burfield Hazzard "Starvation Doctor"
- Occupations: Confidence trickster, alternative medicine practitioner
- Known for: Health fraud through promotion of fasting treatments
- Spouse: Samuel Chrisman Hazzard
- Parent(s): Montgomery and Susanna Neil (Wakefield) Burfield
- Status: Imprisonment (1913–1915); Parole (1915); Pardon (1916)
- Motive: Financial gain
- Criminal charges: Manslaughter, forgery
- Penalty: 2 to 20 years in prison

Details
- Imprisoned at: Washington State Penitentiary, Walla Walla, Washington

Linda Laura Hazzard (née Burfield; December 18, 1867 – June 24, 1938), nicknamed the "Starvation Doctor", was an American quack, swindler, and convicted serial killer noted for her promotion of fasting, pummeling and hours-long enemas as treatments. In 1911, Hazzard was found guilty of manslaughter in the state of Washington and was sentenced to 2 to 20 years of hard labor for killing at least 15 people for financial gain at a sanitarium she operated on the Kitsap Peninsula in the early 20th century. She was released on parole after only serving two years and later, on the condition that she move to New Zealand, received a full pardon from Governor Ernest Lister in 1916. Hazzard died at 70 after subjecting herself to her own treatment methods.

== Career ==
Linda Laura Hazzard was born Lynda Laura Burfield in Carver, Minnesota, oldest of 7 children of Susanna Neil (née Wakefield) and Montgomery Burfield. Hazzard had no medical degree, but was licensed to practice medicine in the state of Washington through a loophole that grandfathered in some practitioners of alternative medicine without degrees. According to her book The Science of Fasting, she studied under Edward Hooker Dewey, MD, a well-known proponent of fasting.

Hazzard developed a fasting method that she claimed was a panacea for all manner of illnesses, ridding the body of toxins that caused imbalances in the body. Over the course of her career, she wrote three books about what she claimed to be the science behind fasting and how it could cure diseases. The first was Fasting for the Cure of Disease (1908), followed by Diet in Disease and Systemic Cleansing (1917). A fifth revised and amplified edition of Fasting for the Cure of Disease was published in 1927 under the title Scientific Fasting: The Ancient and Modern Key to Health.

Hazzard established a "sanitarium" called Wilderness Heights, located in Olalla, Washington, where inpatients fasted for days, weeks, or months on a diet consisting of small amounts of tomato, asparagus juice, and occasionally orange juice. While some patients survived and publicly endorsed Hazzard's methods, dozens died under her care. Hazzard claimed that the deceased had succumbed to undisclosed or hitherto undiagnosed illnesses such as cancer or cirrhosis. Her opponents claimed that they all died of starvation; local residents in Olalla referred to the sanitarium as "Starvation Heights".

In 1912, Hazzard was convicted of manslaughter for the death of Claire Williamson, a wealthy British woman, who weighed less than fifty pounds at the time of her death. At the trial, it was proven that Hazzard had forged Williamson's will and stolen most of her valuables. Williamson's sister, Dorothea, also took the treatment, and, it is alleged, only survived because a family friend showed up in time to remove her from Wilderness Heights. It is suggested that one of the sisters managed to smuggle a telegram to alert their governess, who lived in Australia; however, by the time of arrival, Claire had already died. Dorothea was too weak to leave on her own, weighing less than sixty pounds. She later testified against Hazzard at trial.

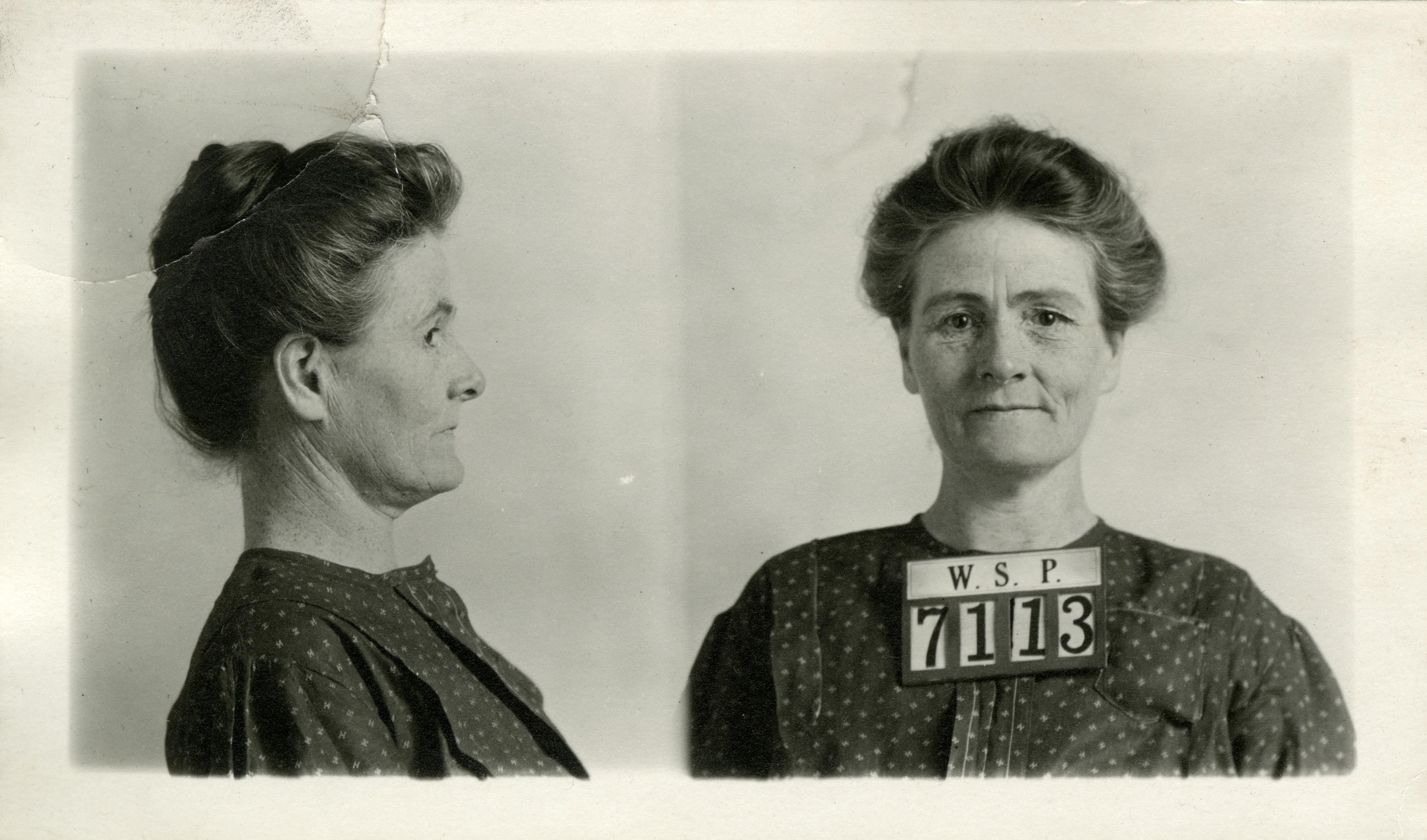
Hazzard's mugshot at Washington State Penitentiary, circa 1913.

Hazzard was sentenced to 2 to 20 years in prison, which she served in the Washington State Penitentiary in Walla Walla. She was released on parole on December 26, 1915, after serving two years, and the following year Governor Ernest Lister gave her a full pardon. Hazzard and her husband, Samuel Chrisman Hazzard (1869–1946), moved to New Zealand, where she practiced as a dietitian and osteopath until 1920.

In 1917, a Whanganui newspaper reported that Hazzard held a practicing certificate from the Washington state medical board. Because she used the title "Doctor", she was charged in Auckland under the Medical Practitioners Act for practicing medicine while not registered to do so, found guilty and fined £5 plus costs (approximately NZ$600 plus costs or US$462.13 plus costs in 2014). Three years later she returned to Olalla, opened a new sanitarium (known publicly as a "school of health" since her medical license had been revoked), and continued to supervise fasts until the sanitarium burned to the ground in 1935; it was never rebuilt.

Hazzard died of starvation in 1938 while attempting a fasting cure.

== Earl Edward Erdman Diary ==
On March 28, 1910, Earl Edward Erdman, a civil engineer with the City of Seattle, died of starvation in the Seattle General Hospital. Erdman had kept a diary which detailed Hazzard's treatment during the preceding weeks that provides an insight into how she treated her patients. The following are excerpts from his diary:

February 1 – Saw Dr. Hazzard and began treatment this date. No breakfast. Mashed soup dinner. Mashed soup supper.

February 5 through 7 – One orange breakfast. Mashed soup dinner. Mashed soup supper.

February 8 – One orange breakfast. Mashed soup dinner. Mashed soup supper.

February 9 through 11 – One orange breakfast. Strained soup dinner. Strained soup supper.

February 12 – One orange breakfast. One orange dinner. One orange supper.

February 13 – Two orange breakfast. No dinner. No supper.

February 14 – One cup of strained tomato broth at 6 p.m.

February 15 – One cup hot strained tomato soup night and morning.

February 16 – One cup hot strained tomato soup a.m. and p.m. Slept better last night. Head quite dizzy. Eyes yellow streaked and red.

February 17 – Ate three oranges today.

February 19 – Called on Dr. (Dawson) today at his home. Slept well Saturday night.

February 20 – Ate strained juice of two small oranges at 10 a.m. Dizzy all day. Ate strained juice of two small oranges at 5 p.m.

February 21 – Ate one cup settled and strained tomato broth. Backache today just below ribs.

February 22 – Ate juice of two small oranges at 10 a.m. Backache today in right side just below ribs.

February 23 – Slept but little last night. Ate two small oranges at 9 a.m. Went after milk and felt very bad. Ate two small oranges 6 p.m.

February 24 – Slept better Wednesday night. Kind of frontal headache in a.m. Ate two small oranges 10 a.m. Ate one and a half cups hot tomato soup at 6 p.m. Heart hit up to ninety-five minute and sweat considerable.

February 25 – Slept pretty well Thursday night. Ate one and a half cups tomato broth 11 a.m. Ate one and a half cups tomato broth 6 p.m. Pain in right below ribs.

February 26 – Did not sleep so very well Friday night. Pain in right side just below ribs in back. Pain quit in night. Ate 1 and a half cups tomato broth at 10:45 a.m. Ate two and a half pump small oranges at 4:30 p.m. Felt better afternoon than for the last week. ...

This diet continued more or less unchanged until his hospitalization on March 28. He died that afternoon, just before his coworker was to transfuse blood.

== Deaths attributed to Hazzard ==
1908

- Lenora (Mrs. Elgin) Wilcox
- Daisey Maud Haglund (mother of Ivar's restaurant founder Ivar Haglund) – the official cause of her death was stomach cancer. Her inability to eat would have caused her to starve to death even without Hazzard's assistance.
- Ida Wilcox

1909

- Blanche B. Tindall
- Viola Heaton
- Eugene Stanley Wakelin – died from a bullet in the head on Hazzard's property. Whether she was responsible for the shooting remains unknown, though it is speculated to be the case.

1910

- Maude Whitney
- Earl Edward Erdman
- L. E. Rader

1911

- Frank Southard
- C.A. Harrison
- Ivan Flux
- Claire Williamson

1912

- Mary Bailey
- Ida Anderson
- Fred Ebson – supervised by another fast enthusiast

== See also ==
- John Bodkin Adams – British doctor who extracted money from his patients before murdering them.
- List of serial killers in the United States
