= Sylvan Beach, Washington =

Community in Washington, US

Coordinates: 47°29′57″N 122°28′38″W

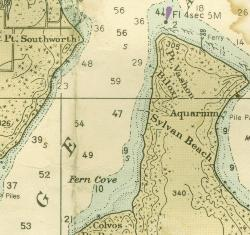

Sylvan Beach is a community located within Vashon, Washington, in King County, Washington, on the west side of Vashon Island on Colvos Passage. It is known as one of Vashon's walk-in communities, since most of the homes can only be reached by walking in from the road on the community's boardwalk. Supplies and goods are conveyed to the homes using wheelbarrows.

== Navigational hazard ==
Sylvan Beach is noted on navigational charts probably because of the old pilings which extend 100 yards out into Colvos Passage. The piles are all that remains of a dock that served the Virginia V, the passenger-only, mosquito fleet steamship ferry, that ran daily from Tacoma to Seattle.
