= Ivar Feeding the Gulls =

Sculpture in Seattle, Washington, U.S.

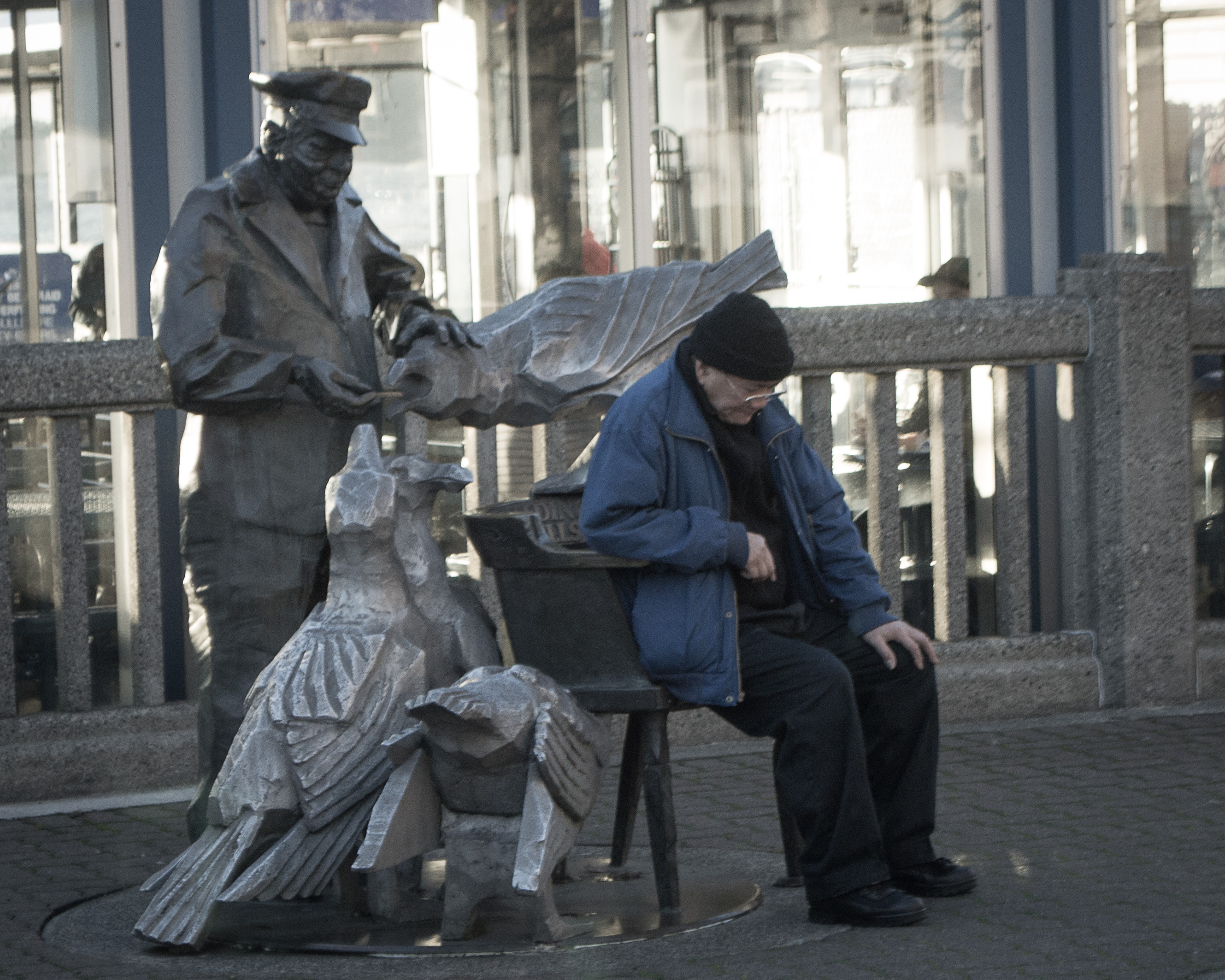
- Artist: Richard Beyer
- Year: 1988
- Subject: Ivar Haglund
- Location: Seattle, Washington, U.S.
- 47.603839°N 122.338763°W

Ivar Feeding the Gulls is an outdoor 1988 bronze and aluminum sculpture by Richard Beyer, installed outside Ivar's Fish Bar by Pier 54, along Seattle's Waterfront in the U.S. state of Washington. The statue depicts Ivar Haglund, who founded the restaurant, feeding French fries to gulls. It was donated by a group of friends; their names are inscribed on the back of the chair.
