= Blake Island =

Island in the Puget Sound, Washington, U.S.

Blake Island Marine State Park
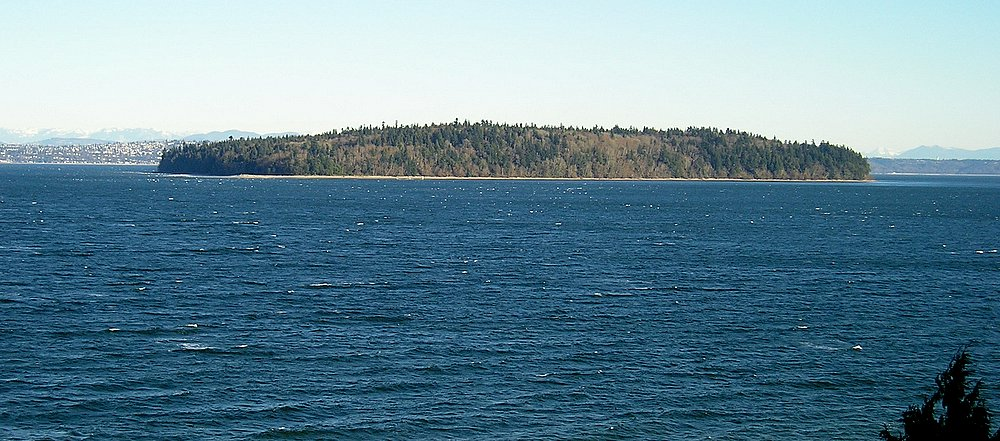
- The island seen from the west

- Location within Washington (state) Location within the United States
- Location: Kitsap County, Washington, United States
- Nearest town: Manchester, Washington
- Coordinates: 47°32′19″N 122°29′34″W
- Area: 1,127 acres (456 ha)
- Elevation: 190 ft (58 m)
- Established: 1959
- Administrator: Washington State Parks and Recreation Commission
- Blake Island
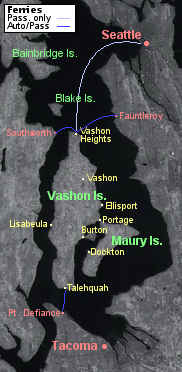
- Map showing relation of Blake Island to Seattle, Washington
- Interactive map of Blake Island
- Location: Puget Sound, Washington

Administration
- United States

Blake Island (Lushootseed: tatču) is a Puget Sound island in Kitsap County, Washington, United States, that is preserved as Blake Island Marine State Park. The island lies north of Vashon Island, south of Bainbridge Island, and east of Manchester. Until 2021, the northeast end of the island was home to Tillicum Village, a tourist attraction based on Northwest Coast Indian arts, culture, and food. The park is managed by the Washington State Parks and Recreation Commission.

== History ==
Blake Island was traditionally used as a summer camping ground by the sx̌aq̓tabš, a predecessor band of the Suquamish tribe. In about 1786, according to Suquamish oral tradition it was the birthplace of Chief Seattle, a Suquamish and Duwamish leader for whom the city of Seattle was named.

The first European to record the island was British explorer George Vancouver in 1792, as part of his exploration of Puget Sound, though it was not named.

In 1841, Lt. Charles Wilkes of the United States Exploring Expedition named it Blake Island for George Smith Blake, the officer in charge of the United States Coast Survey between 1837 and 1848. Locally, it was known as Smuggler's Island. In the mid 19th century, the island was logged for its timber. During the Prohibition, it was frequently used as a refuge for bootleggers smuggling alcohol from Canada.

William Pitt Trimble, a Seattle millionaire, purchased Blake island, and renamed it Trimble Island. By 1917 he and his family lived there in a magnificent estate.

The Trimble family invited Camp Fire Girls from Seattle, and throughout Washington state to hold their first summer resident camp on Trimble Island in 1920. The girls named their camp Camp Sealth in honor of the birthplace of Chief Sealth. They paid for a delivery of logs, but soon found them floating away at high tide. They scrambled to haul them back, and soon found themselves dealing with a fire on the island. Because the Trimble family had other plans for the island, Camp Fire Girls of Seattle searched for a new, and permanent location for Camp Sealth and by the next summer had moved it to Vashon Island, where it remains today.

The Trimble family's occupation of the island came to an end in 1929 when William Trimble's wife Cassandra died in an accident in Seattle, after which the family abandoned the island and left the house to decay. Trimble sold Blake Island to an investment company in 1936 and retired in Seattle.

During World War II, a unit of the Coastal Artillery of the US Army was garrisoned in the Trimble mansion. The again-abandoned mansion burned around 1948, when a fire built by two young men trying to get warm went out of control, leaving only the foundations visible today.

In 1959, the state of Washington made the entire island a state park. In 1993, U.S. President Bill Clinton hosted member economies' leaders on Blake Island for an APEC Meeting.

== Activities and amenities ==
The park is only reachable by tour boat or private watercraft. Park boundaries extend one-quarter of a mile beyond the island's shoreline, providing moorage buoys and diving area. The park's 1,127 acres (456 ha) includes five miles of shoreline with views of the Olympic Mountains and the Seattle skyline. The park offers hiking and biking trails, fishing, shellfish harvesting, sports fields, and marina. The island is home to a variety of wildlife, including deer that sometimes swim from the mainland to the island from Manchester.

== See also ==
- Whaleback Rocks

== More reading ==
- Kitsap County Historical Society, Kitsap County: A History, 2nd edition, 1981.
