= Camp Sealth =

Camp in Washington (state), U.S.

Coordinates: 47°21′56″N 122°31′05″W

Camp Sealth is owned and operated by Camp Fire, a non-profit youth organization, and located on Vashon Island, Washington. Sealth hosts resident and day camp during the summer, environmental education for school groups during the spring and fall, and is a year-round conference and retreat center. Camp Sealth is accredited by the American Camp Association.

== Location ==
Camp Sealth is located on Vashon Island, Washington, has nearly 400 acres (1.6 km^{2}) of forest, wetland and marine environment, and over a mile of waterfront along Colvos Passage in the Puget Sound. Most summer campers travel to Sealth via an Argosy boat affectionately called "Da Boata".

== History ==
Camp Sealth was founded in 1920 as the first permanent resident camp for girls in Washington State. It began on Blake Island for the first season, then moved to its present location on Vashon Island in 1921. The South End Forest Fire on Vashon burned a good deal of Camp Sealth in 1922, and campers helped fight the fire. Rounds Hall, the dining hall, was built in 1921, and it is dedicated to Edward "Daddy" Rounds. In the 1990s, the present Wrangler unit, barn and riding facilities were built. In 2005, extensive renovation included the new Green Birdcage building which replaced the old arts & crafts building, and renovation of three other buildings, including the dining hall.

Camp Sealth was a girls camp until 1975, when Camp Fire became a co-educational organization.

== Campers and staff ==
Camp Sealth is a traditional, coed camp serving children ages 4–18. The camp has a strong emphasis on diversity and inclusion, and welcomes campers and staff from a wide variety of backgrounds. Camp Sealth has a strong partnership with the American Diabetes Association, serving campers with diabetes since 1941. Sealth also partners with the Gluten Intolerance Group, and the PKU clinic at the University of Washington to support campers with special medical and dietary needs. Scholarships ("camperships") for low-income kids are available. All staff must choose a nickname like "Oak" or "Zipper" or any other name to provide the adults with privacy and security. Some staff let their campers try to figure out their names at the end of camp. These nicknames are what the campers call their staff and counselors.

Each summer, Camp Sealth hires about 100 staff who work as counselors, unit leaders, program specialists and support staff.

== Resident camp programs ==
=== Description ===
Sealth is one of the West Coast's largest traditional summer camps. Each session, between 250 and 300 campers attend overnight camp at Sealth. The summer season runs from late June through the end of August, and includes eight sessions ranging in length from 4 to 13 days long.

=== Classic Camp ===
Most campers attend "Classic Camp." Classic camp consists of many traditional camp activities, including archery, arts & crafts, boating, fishing, swimming, hikes, overnight campouts, outdoor cooking, nature, marine "touch tanks", games, songs, theme meals, and much more. Campers are highly involved in planning their own schedule, and a session at camp is based on what the kids want to do. Kids are placed in classic camp groups based on their age. Within the camp groups are the different cabins which have their own counselors.

=== Overnight campout ===
Overnight campouts are what campers, unless in the outback session, do one night at camp. The overnight is when campers hike to a camp spot already chosen previously by staff. There is a firepit, tarp for sleeping under, an outhouse, and a picnic table. At the overnight there are other campers from other cabins, so there is a lot of game playing with others. The campers also make their own food with help from their counselors. The campers also may do "challenge", which are group games. The overnight is an actual camping experience as opposed to the cabins where the campers usually sleep.

=== Specialty programs ===
Wrangler is Camp Sealth's horse camp program for kids ages nine and older. Kids spend 2–4 hours each day with the horses, including trail rides, arena lessons, horseback games, service projects and ground lessons.

Sealth's boating unit, Kiwanis, is for middle school and high school youth, and focuses on windsurfing, kayaking and sailing. In addition, two sessions offer a unique "Nocturnal" program where campers stay up at night and sleep during the day.

The Tripping and Outback unit focuses on outdoor living, backpacking, and occasionally leaves camp for one-day or multi-day trips. Past and current trips include backpacking, biking, kayaking, river rafting, climbing, geocaching and more. There is also a Splash Camp for children ages 9–11 where they go to different pools in the Vashon area.

Sealth offers many opportunities for teens interested in leadership, including the Counselor-in-Training (CIT), Riding-Staff-In-Training (RSIT), and High School Internship programs. CITs and RSITs are leadership campers that participate in skills workshops and job shadows to learn more about working as camp staff. High School Interns are volunteer junior staff who work alongside counselors and specialists.

== Day camp programs ==
Camp Sealth also hosts a summer-long day camp program for kids ages 4 to 12, primarily for Vashon Island youth. Between 20 and 40 campers attend each themed week of day camp. Day Camp themes include "Harry Potter", "Space Odyssey" and "It's a Mad, Mad Science Camp".

== Alumni ==
Every two years (odd years) Camp Fire members and Camp Sealth past attendees and staff, gather in September to sing old camp songs, participate in a service project, as well as reconnect with old friends.
