= Colvos Passage =

Tidal strait in Washington State

Coordinates: 47.425765°N 122.521591°W

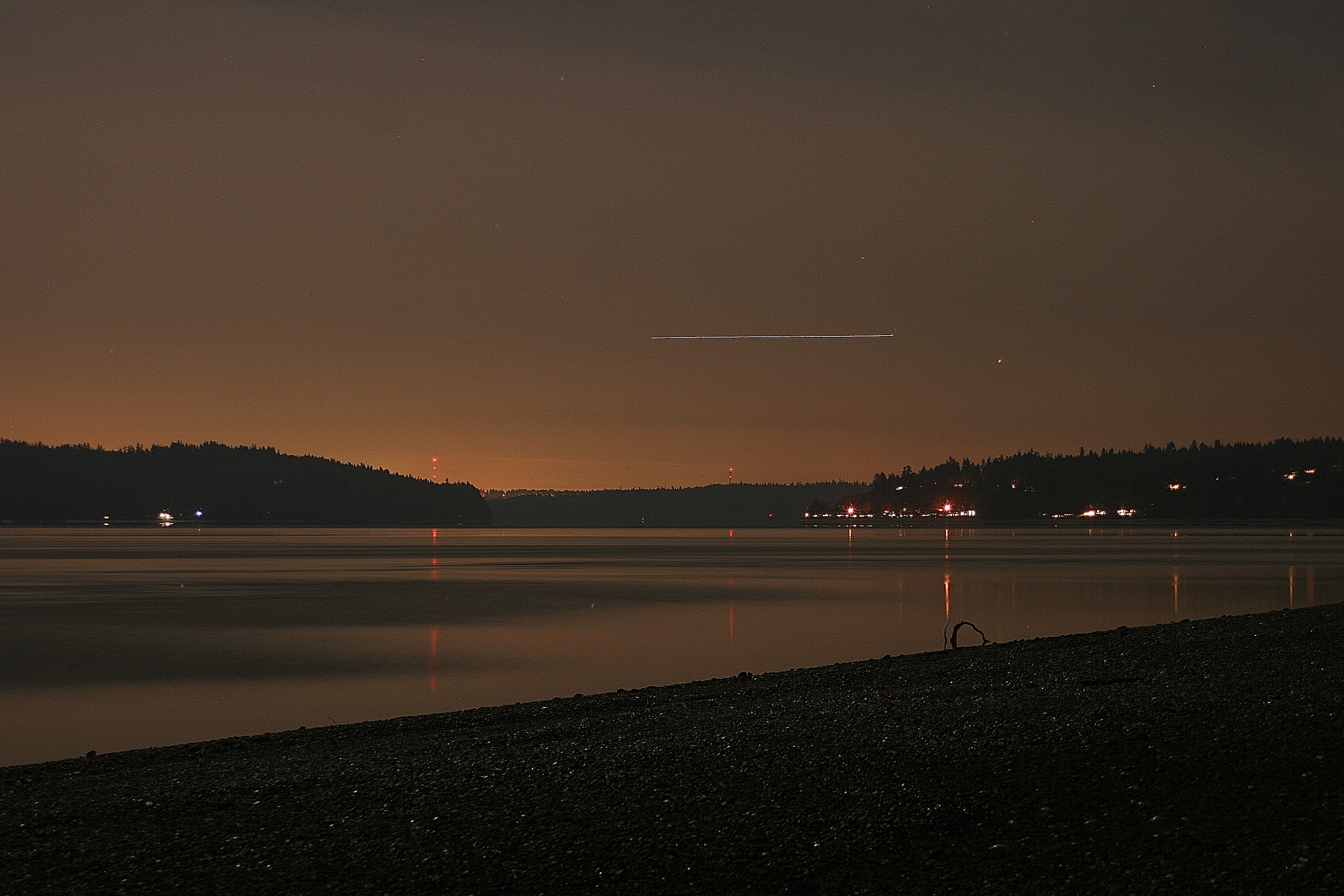
Colvos Passage at Night, as seen from Olalla

The Colvos Passage is a tidal strait within Puget Sound in the American state of Washington running west of Vashon Island between the island and the Kitsap Peninsula. It lies just north of the Dalco Passage. Colvos Passage has a permanent predominantly northbound current, in contrast to the rest of Puget Sound which varies with the tide. The communities of Fragaria, Olalla, Sunrise Beach, Spring Beach, Maplewood, Lisabeula, Paradise Cove and Sylvan Beach are located on Colvos Passage.

Colvos Passage was named by Charles Wilkes during the United States Exploring Expedition, to honor George Colvocoresses, a midshipman for the expedition. Wilkes considered his name too long for geographic honors and so shortened it to Colvos on the official charts.
