= Fragaria, Washington =

Unincorporated community in Washington, United States

- Unincorporated community
- Location in Washington and the United States Fragaria (the United States)
- Coordinates: 47°27′8″N 122°31′8″W
- Country: United States
- State: Washington
- County: Kitsap
- Time zone: UTC-8 (Pacific (PST))
  - Summer (DST): UTC-7 (PDT)
- GNIS feature ID: 1510977

Fragaria is an unincorporated community in Kitsap County, Washington, United States.

A post office called Fragaria was established in 1911, and remained in operation until 1955. The community was named for the local cultivation of strawberries (scientific name: Fragaria).

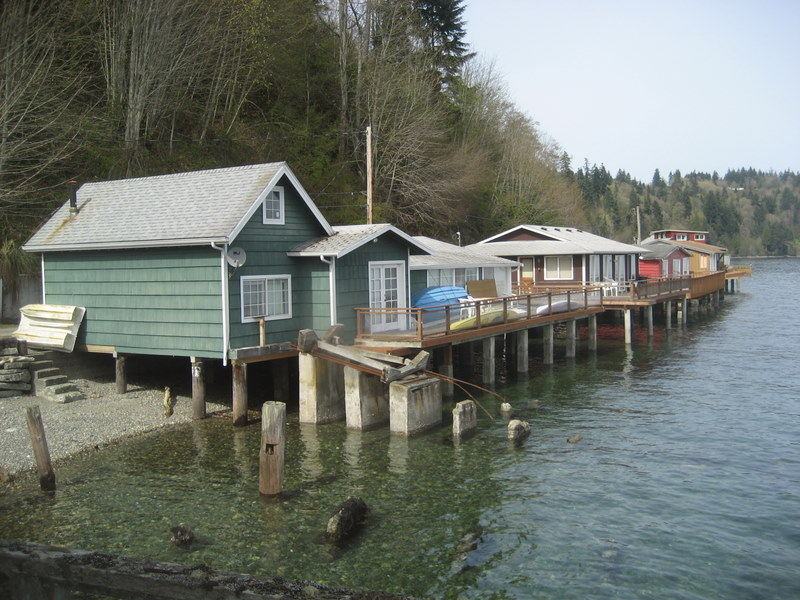
Beach cottages in Fragaria along Colvos Passage in Kitsap County
