= William Pitt Trimble =

American attorney and businessman (1863–1943)

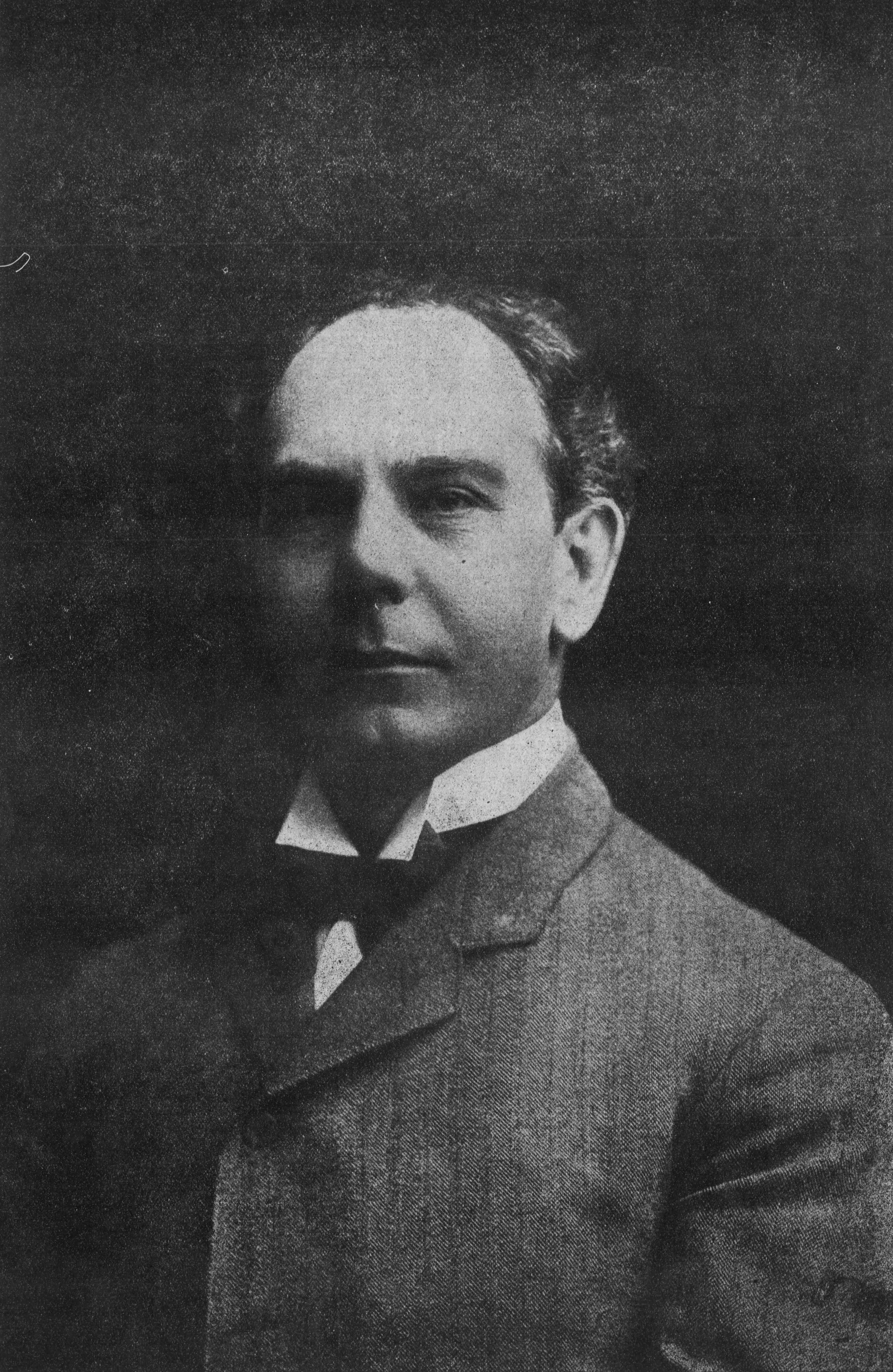
- Trimble in 1908
- Born: February 2, 1865; Cynthiana, Kentucky, US
- Died: March 19, 1943 (aged 78); Seattle, Washington, US
- Education: University of Cincinnati
- Occupations: Attorney, businessman

William Pitt Trimble (February 2, 1865 — March 19, 1943) (Note: Sources disagree on Trimble's exact birthdate. Trimble's biographical entry in History of Washington lists his birthdate as being February 2, 1865, while HistoryLink records him as having been born in 1863.) was an American attorney and businessman who was active in Washington state. Trimble began his career as an attorney but turned to real estate shortly after moving to Seattle, becoming one of the wealthiest men in the city by 1904. Trimble was active in local politics, unsuccessfully running for both Mayor of Seattle and Governor of Washington before being named Seattle's planning commissioner. Trimble purchased Blake Island in the Puget Sound in 1911 and lived there from 1917 to 1924.

== Early life ==
Trimble was born on February 2, 1865, in Cynthiana, Kentucky. He came from a family of lawyers—his father was an attorney, his grandfather was a justice of the Kentucky Supreme Court, and his great-uncle was Robert Trimble, an Associate Justice of the Supreme Court of the United States.

As a child, he studied in public schools in Kentucky and Ohio, along with Paris' École Alsacienne. He attended the University of Cincinnati and studied law at the school's College of Law.

== Career ==
Trimble moved to Washington in 1890 and settled in Seattle two years later. He worked as a real estate financier and cultivated a network of buildings throughout downtown Seattle. In 1899, he was involved in a legal dispute with the state of Washington relating to the jurisdiction of the Washington Board of Land Commissioners, and in 1903 he sued King County, arguing that land he owned was not eligible for condemnation. By 1904, Trimble's real estate business was so successful that he was listed as one of the wealthiest men in Seattle.

In 1908, Trimble ran for Mayor of Seattle as a Republican. Throughout his campaign, he was viewed as a strong contender and was endorsed by The Seattle Republican. He came second in the primary, losing the party's nomination to John F. Miller, who would go on to win the general election as well. An op-ed in The Seattle Republican later attributed Trimble's loss to being endorsed by The Seattle Times. Trimble later served as a presidential elector for the 1908 United States presidential election. The mayoral campaign was good for Trimble's reputation and for the next year he was regularly suggested as a candidate for the United States Senate.

In 1911, Trimble announced his candidacy for Governor of Washington, citing high taxes, infrastructure, and women's rights as key issues in his campaign. Shortly after his announcement, The Idaho Republican alleged that he had enclosed money with his campaign announcements but requested newspapers not label the announcement advertising, and Trimble's name did not ultimately appear on the ballot. Trimble remained somewhat active in politics, advocating for the construction of a transit system in Seattle, serving on the cities' charter commission, and arguing against changing the name of Mount Rainier.

In 1925, while serving as Seattle's planning commissioner, Trimble revived his transit advocacy, proposing a $4,000,000 investment in a city-wide transit system (equivalent to $138,214,286 in 2025). His "Rapid Transit" plan was approved in August 1926, however, the project was plagued with financial issues. Trimble lost a significant portion of his wealth in the Wall Street crash of 1929.

=== Blake Island ===
In 1911, Trimble, who already owned part of Blake Island in the Puget Sound, purchased the island's remaining land and became the sole owner, renaming the island as "Trimble Island." In 1917, he and his family moved to a newly constructed mansion there. They were the first family to move to the island, and Trimble acted as the island's postmaster and handled the bi-weekly delivery of supplies to the island. While living on the island, Trimble donated property to the Seattle branch of the Camp Fire Girls.

The family moved back to Seattle in 1924 but continued to use their home on the island as a vacation residence. After his wife's death in 1929, Trimble never returned to Blake Island. In 1936, he traded the island to Ben Ehrlichman for ownership of the Medical Arts Building in Tacoma.

In 1948, several years after Trimble's death, the mansion on Blake Island burnt down in a fire. For sixty years, the perpetrators were unknown, and rumors circulated in the local area that the mansion had been burnt by the Navy as a pretext to construct a military base on the island. In 2008, a man came forward and admitted that he had accidentally burnt down the mansion after exploring the island with a friend in high school.

== Personal life ==
Trimble married his wife, Cannie Webb Ford, in 1897. He had five children. Upon marrying William, Cannie changed her name to Cannie Ford Trimble. She was a founding member of the Seattle Historical Society. Cannie was killed in an automobile accident on December 7, 1929, when the family car crashed into Elliott Bay.

Trimble was an aviation enthusiast and president of a Seattle-area aviators club. In 1909, he became one of the first men in the Pacific Northwest to own an airship, saying "Within the next ten years airships will be as common as automobiles."

Trimble died on March 19, 1943.
