= Ivar's =

Seafood restaurant chain in the U.S. state of Washington

Restaurant information
- Established: 1938; 88 years ago
- Previous owner: Ivar Haglund
- Food type: Seafood
- Location: Seattle, Washington
- Website: ivars.com

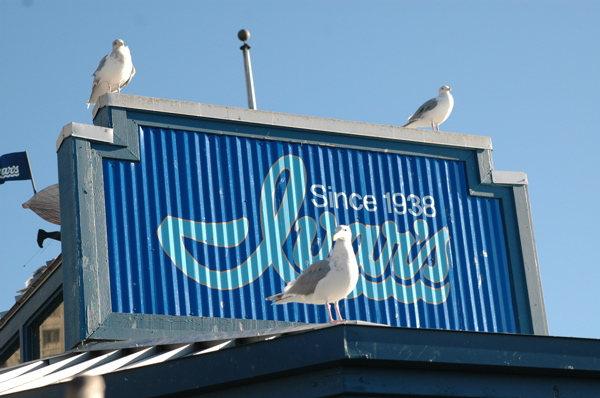
Ivar's Acres of Clams

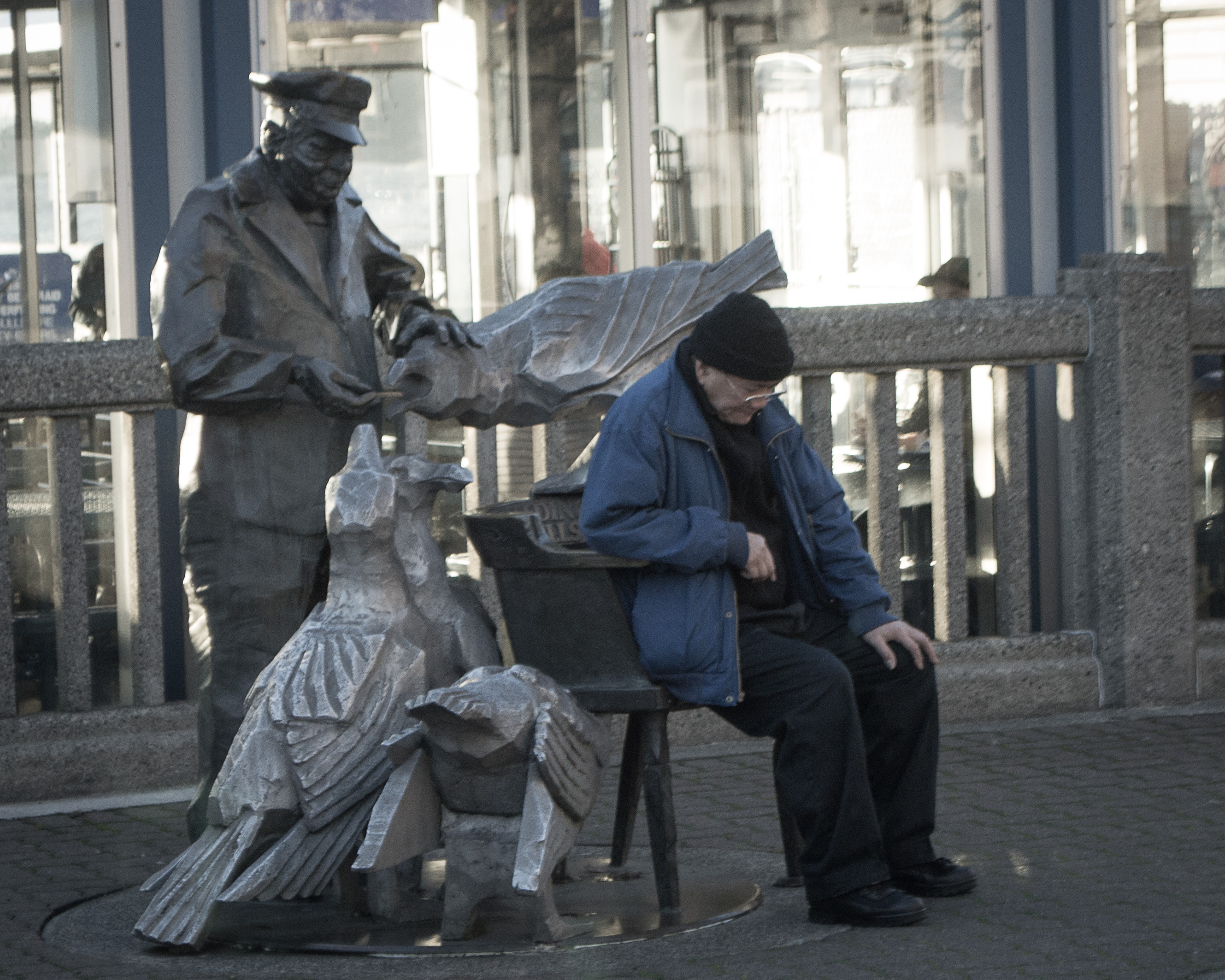
Ivar Feeding the Gulls sculpture, outside Ivar's, Pier 54, Seattle

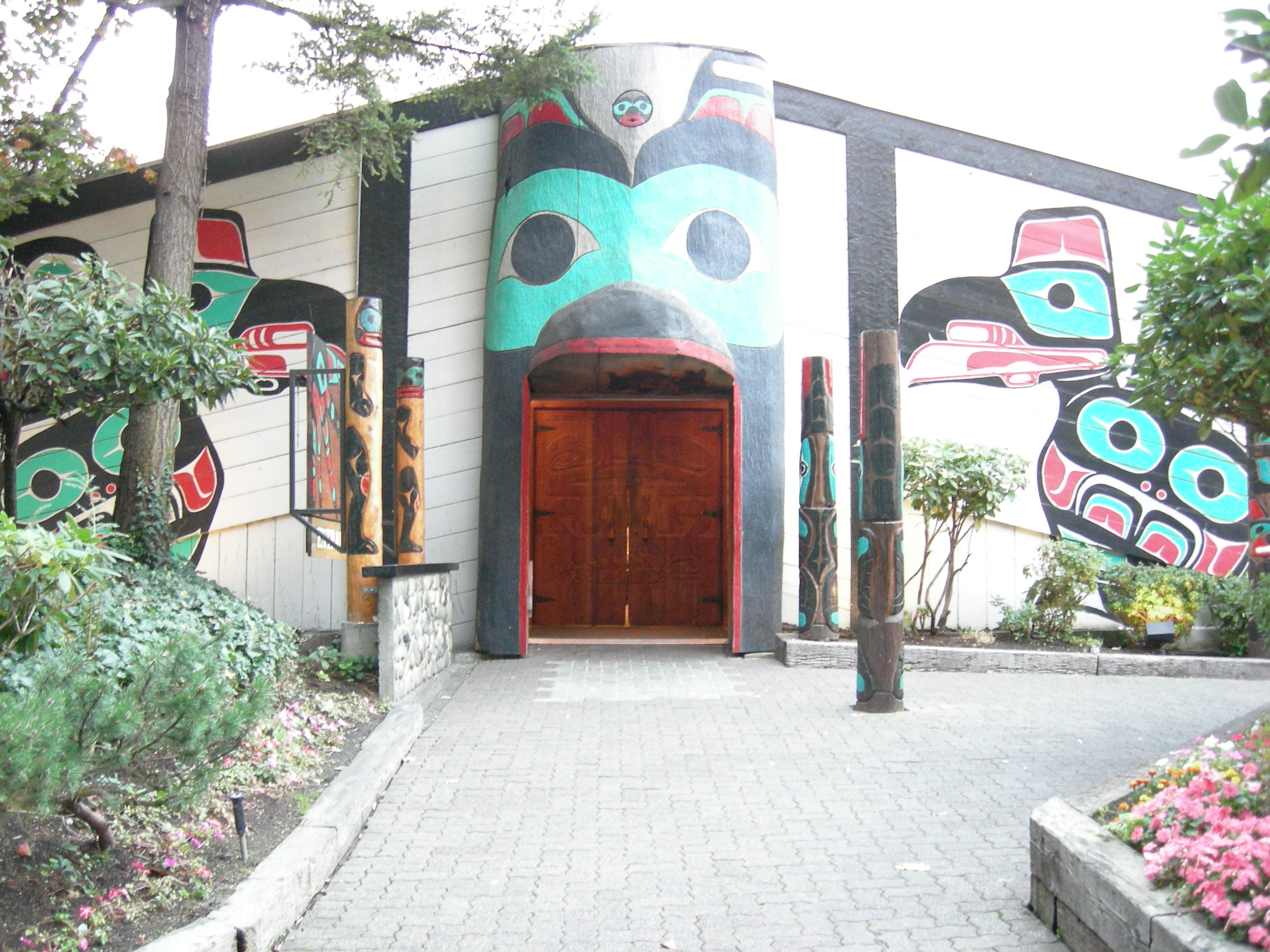
Main entrance of Ivar's Salmon House

Ivar's is a seafood restaurant chain based in Seattle, Washington, United States, with operations in the Puget Sound region. It is known for its clam chowder, fish and chips (cod or halibut), and salmon. It also has clams, shrimp, and salads with seafood.

Ivar's also owns the Seattle-based burger restaurant chain Kidd Valley.

== History ==
Ivar's was founded in 1938 by Seattle folk singer Ivar Haglund. Having built Seattle's first aquarium on what is now Pier 54, he decided to add a companion fish and chips bar to feed his visitors. The bar was short-lived, however. On July 22, 1946, Haglund opened a new restaurant, Ivar's Acres of Clams, at the same location. The aquarium closed ten years later, but the restaurant remains.

Ivar's has two other full-service restaurants: Ivar's Salmon House in Seattle's Northlake neighborhood, and Ivar's Mukilteo Landing in Mukilteo, Washington, near the Washington State Ferries terminal. There is a fishbar outside of all three full-service restaurants. All its other locations are seafood bars. There are several Ivar's and Kidd Valley locations at T-Mobile Park, home of the Seattle Mariners, that are operated by the ballpark's concessions contractor. The outlets serve garlic fries along with other seafood fare.

Nard Jones remarked in 1972 that Haglund was "not afraid to reflect Puget Sound tradition in the decor of his restaurants, whereas others of his profession seem intent on making their patrons forget where they are." In this respect, he singled out the Salmon House, "an almost exact replica of an old Indian longhouse."

Every Independence Day from 1964 until 2008, Ivar's sponsored the Fourth of Jul-Ivar's festival and fireworks show at Downtown Seattle's Myrtle Edwards Park on Elliott Bay. Ivar's estimated its attendance at around 300,000 people. On April 3, 2009, Ivar's announced it was no longer sponsoring its Fourth of Jul-Ivar's community fireworks show. Ivar's decided to focus its efforts on feeding families in the Pacific Northwest through its partnership with Northwest Harvest.

The soups and chowders used in Ivar's restaurants are manufactured at a plant in Mukilteo by Ivar's Soup Company, a subsidiary. The plant also produces packaged soups for retailers, including some private label products, in the United States and Mexico. These soups are also sold onboard Washington State Ferries vessels and Amtrak Cascades trains in the region. In 2021, Kettle Classic Clam Chowder with Uncured Bacon, sold only at Costco, was recalled in 13 states for plastic in the Chowder.

== Underwater billboard hoax ==
Capitalizing on founder Haglund's reputation for eccentric marketing stunts, Ivar's put out a story that Haglund had placed billboards on the bottom of the Sound, related to a proposal he had once made for submarine traffic as a viable mode of transportation. Some documentation was released, including maps of possible sub-aquatic billboard locations. On August 22, 2009, one of the rumored signs was discovered and hoisted out of the water, advertising a cup of Clam Chowder for $0.75. Several other signs followed. The signs were displayed publicly as authentic, with Ivar's saying that for a time they would honor the $0.75 price for chowder.

All of this turned out to be a hoax. The signs were sunk earlier in 2009, and local historian Paul Dorpat had deliberately furthered the hoax. Dorpat, of HistoryLink contributes a weekly column to the Seattle Times, and attempted to hoax that newspaper, whose first story about the billboards cast doubt on their authenticity, stating, "if it was a hoax, a prime suspect would be the Ivar's chain itself." Several minor clues were placed to guarantee that the hoax would eventually unravel. For example, the chowder price wasn't correct for the ostensible date, and the wrong governor's name was on the letterhead from the Department of Fisheries.

== See also ==
- Fried clams
- Ivar Feeding the Gulls (1988)
- List of seafood restaurants
- Rally fries
