= Olalla, Washington =

Unincorporated community in Washington, United States

- Unincorporated community
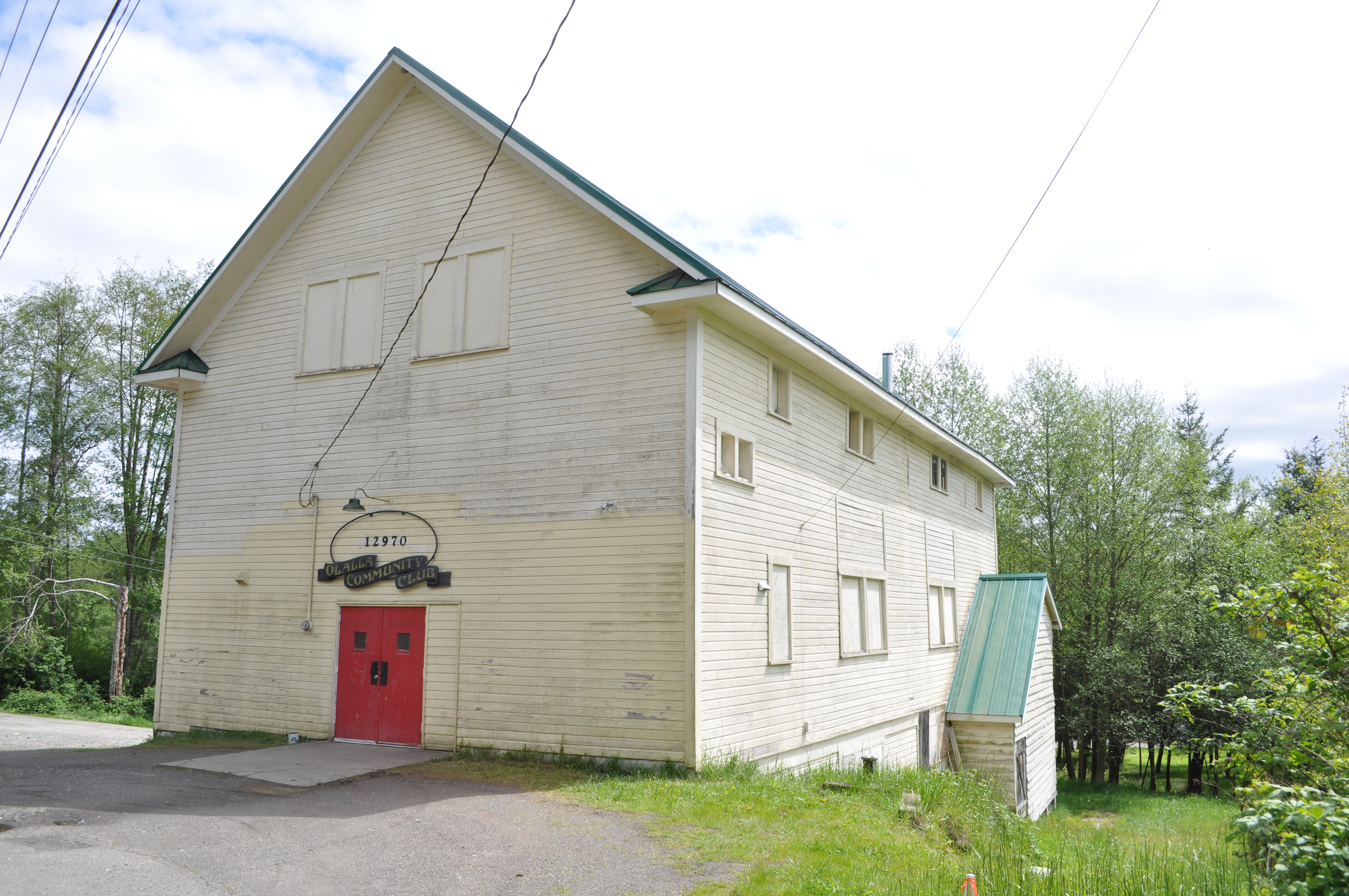
- Olalla Community Club

- Location in Washington and the United States Olalla (the United States)
- Coordinates: 47°25′19″N 122°32′30″W
- Country: United States
- State: Washington
- County: Kitsap
- Elevation: 331 ft (101 m)
- Time zone: UTC-8 (Pacific (PST))
  - Summer (DST): UTC-7 (PDT)
- ZIP codes: 98359
- GNIS feature ID: 1512528

Olalla is a small unincorporated community in Kitsap County, Washington, United States. It is located on Colvos Passage on Puget Sound, just north of the Pierce County county line. Olalla used to be as large as Port Orchard, the county seat of Kitsap County. Olalla was settled in its early years by a large number of Norwegian and other Scandinavian immigrants because of its similarities to their native countries. Noted as early as the 1860s, Olalla developed a commerce center by way of its good sea water access. The "old town" port located on Olalla Bay was made up of many business buildings, most on piers. Shipping and the mosquito fleet (ferrying system at that time) was very busy moving materials, goods and people.

== Etymology ==
Olalla's name is the Salishan and Chinook Jargon word for "berry" or "berries" (usually olallie or ollalie in most lexicons of the jargon).

== History ==
By the end of the 19th century, the cutting down of all old-growth forest was well on its way out. Olalla was no exception. The land was stripped clean leaving a barren landscape. This created an opportunity for farming as dynamiting stump and clearing the land became a standard operation. With European immigration fueling the growth spurt, new commerce came by growing strawberries and vegetables. Olalla being a port of commerce flourished as the logging, farming and boat building were king.

Olalla was served by many steamships, including the Virginia V which is the last operational example of a Puget Sound Mosquito Fleet steamer. She was built along the shores just south of Olalla near Maplewood. She was once part of a large fleet of small passenger and freight carrying ships that linked the islands and ports of Puget Sound in Washington state in the late 19th and early 20th centuries. On 21 October 1934, a severe Pacific storm swept through the Puget Sound. Virginia V was attempting to dock at Olalla, when the brunt of the storm hit. The powerful winds pushed the ship against the dock as the waves pounded the ship into the pilings. The result was the near destruction of the upper decks.

Since the Narrows Bridge was built, Olalla has enjoyed a quiet rural setting while being converted into a residential community for commuters to nearby cities and towns. Olalla Bay Market & Landing (formerly Al's Grocery Store) is the only old structure left by the lagoon and the locals hold it dear to their hearts.

Olalla has a small claim to fame as the location of an early 20th-century health retreat (Sanitarium) called Wilderness Heights a.k.a. "Starvation Heights". The sanitarium was owned and operated by Dr. Linda Burfield Hazzard. Hazzard's practice of starvation to cure one's ills resulted in the death of a visiting English heiress in 1911, and the conviction of Hazzard for her murder. The original bathtub where Hazzard performed autopsies is still in the house, which has a family residing there.

=== Olalla Community Club ===
On the way up hill along the Olalla Valley Road from the lagoon, the Olalla Bible Church and the Olalla Community Club stand. The OCC was built around 1906 by the Modern Woodsman of America and in 1937 they deeded the structure to the community. The OCC was incorporated and chartered to serve the community. Its mission is to support the citizen, organizations and maintain the building for social and civic needs. Over the decades, several renovations have taken place. In 1976, the OCC created its non-profit status and in September 2007 a new metal roof was installed. The current president is Marty Kellogg. Next to the OCC is the Olalla Bible Church, built around 1910. Together they represent some of the oldest and largest historic buildings still in working order in South Kitsap.

=== Arts and culture ===
Throughout Olalla's history, the strong sense of community has played out in various forms of a community celebrations. Most notable was the Strawberry Festivals in the 1960s and beginning in 1991, a 25-year run with the Olalla Bluegrass Festival. Currently, the name has changed to the Olalla Americana Festival to support a wider genre of music.

=== Olalla Lavender Festival ===
The Olalla Lavender Festival is an annual community event held in July in Olalla, Washington, celebrating lavender, local agriculture, and the arts.

First held in 2024, the festival includes farm tours, artisan vendors, educational activities, and workshops focused on the uses and cultivation of lavender. Events take place across multiple venues in the Olalla area, including farms, community spaces, and local businesses.

The festival was inspired in part by lavender traditions in Provence, France, and aims to highlight both the cultural and practical uses of lavender, including culinary, wellness, and craft applications.

== Notable people ==
Olalla author Gregg Olsen wrote about Starvation Heights in his award-winning book of the same name. Olsen acquired Al's, after its shutdown during the COVID-19 pandemic; Kona Ice, a small shaved ice company, operates out of the location.

== See also ==
- List of Chinook Jargon placenames
