= Lake Washington steamboats and ferries =

Defunct ferry system in Washington state

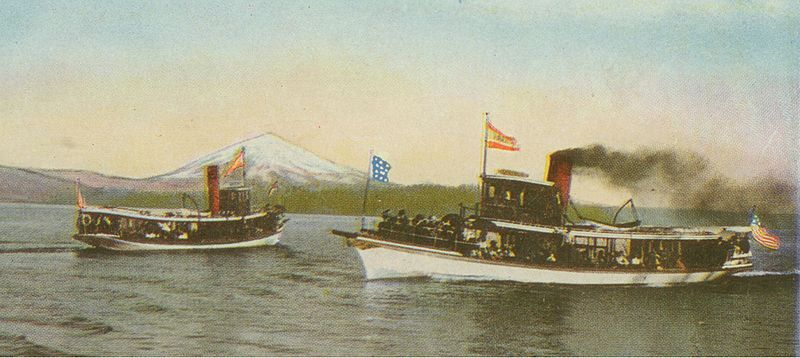
- Steamboats on Lake Washington near Leschi Park, circa 1906.
- Transit type: Passenger-only steamboats, vehicle ferries.
- Route: Lake Washington
- Line: Anderson Steamboat Co.; King County Ferry Dist. No. 1.
- Terminals: Madison Park, Leschi Park, Mercer Is., Medina, Kirkland
- Began operation: c. 1875; 150 years ago
- Ended operation: 1951; 74 years ago (last ferry run)
- No. of vessels: Fortuna, Leschi and many others.
- Connections at terminus
- Tram: Connection to Yesler Avenue cable car terminus at Leschi Park

Lake Washington steamboats and ferries operated from about 1875 to 1951, transporting passengers, vehicles and freight across Lake Washington, a large lake to the east of Seattle, Washington. Before modern highways and bridges were built, the only means of crossing the lake, other than the traditional canoe or rowboat, was by steamboat, and, later, by ferry. While there was no easily navigable connection to Puget Sound, the Lake Washington Ship Canal now connects Lake Washington to Lake Union, and from there Puget Sound is reached by way of the Hiram M. Chittenden Locks.

== Beginnings ==
In the 1870s the sternwheeler Lena C. Gray was built in Seattle, and operated on Lake Washington most of the time, towing barges. In about 1886, Edward F. Lee established a shipyard on the west side Lake Washington. The Lee yard is believed to have built the following ships that worked Lake Washington and Puget Sound: the small steam scow Squak, Laura Maud, Elfin, Hattie Hansen (also known as Sechelt), and Mist. Other early steamboats on the lake were Kirkland and Mary Kraft.

G.V. Johnson also built a shipyard on the lake in 1888, and from it launched, among others, the steamers L.T. Haas, Acme, and City of Renton. Another early steamboat on Lake Washington was the clipper-bowed yacht-like Cyrene, built in 1891. and the C.C. Calkins. In 1893, Hattie Hansen, later to have a tragic end off Vancouver Island was built at the Lee shipyard. Hattie Hansen only served on the lake until the next year, when she was brought down the Black and Duwamish rivers and placed on the Seattle-Dogfish Bay route under Capt. J.J. Hansen.

== Rise of Anderson Steamboat Company ==
Steamboat operations on Lake Washington eventually became almost the sole province of one firm, Anderson Steamboat Company, founded by John L. Anderson, an immigrant from Sweden. His brother, Adolph Anderson, was also a steamboat master on the lake. The company's headquarters was at Leschi Park, and the company had a shipyard across the lake at Houghton.

Anderson had worked his way up from deckhand to skipper of the C.C. Calkins, and in 1895, he was able to buy his one steamboat, the Winnifred, which burned the next year, 1896, at Leschi Park. Anderson then bought for $1,600, the aging propeller steamer Quickstep, which had been built at Astoria in 1877. Quickstep also burned in 1896, and Captain Anderson, undaunted, salvaged her engines to place in a new boat he would build at his own yard, Lady of the Lake.

== Construction of steamboats on lake ==
In 1900, the Anderson yard built the steam launch Elsinore, and for a while the Anderson concern ran her between Leschi and Madison parks. Later she was sold to Capt. George Jenkins, who ran her for many years on Lake Whatcom. L.T. Haas, built for the Interlaken Steamboat Company, was launched in 1902, and later acquired by Captain Anderson. Like the fate of many other boats, L.T. Haas was destroyed by fire in 1909.

In 1904 Anderson built the steel-hulled sternwheel passenger steamer Mercer (84 tons, 65' long). In 1906, the passenger steamer C.F. (8 tons) was built at Tacoma and later operated on Lake Washington at Leschi Park by Adolph Anderson (brother of John Anderson and Louis Birch. Also in 1906, the Anderson yard built the passenger steamer Fortuna (81 tons, 107' long) for the partnership between Anderson and the Seattle Street Railway. Fortuna had compound engines that had been built at Seattle Machine Works. Fortuna stayed in service until 1938, although in 1915 the vessel was rebuilt as an automobile ferry.

In 1909, the Anderson yard built Triton (49 tons, 78' feet) at Houghton for the Lake Washington service. Also in that year Capt. Simon Brunn built at Lenora the steamer Juanita for passenger service on the Kirkland-Madison Park run. (Juanita only lasted a few years. In 1912, she was being taken down to the Sound on the Cedar River, and ran aground on a sand bar, then burned.) Additionally, to serve the crowds at the Alaska–Yukon–Pacific Exposition, Cyrene was rebuilt and enlarged, her pilot house being moved to the upper deck. Captain Anderson preferred mystic-sounding names for his boats, of which by 1909 he had fourteen, including among them the Atalanta, Aquilo, and Xanthus. Other boats on the lake included the steam launch Ramona and the little steamer May Blossom, which used to run from Lake Washington up Sammamish Slough to Bothell.

== Routes on the lake ==
Anderson's company had over 50 stops on the lake, including the elegant C.C. Calkins Hotel on Mercer Island. The company's main terminal was at Leschi which in 1888 was connected to Seattle by cable car. Leschi Park was a popular resort, for example over 40,000 people went there on the Fourth of July, 1908, and this was good for the water tour business which was an important part of the Anderson firm's trade.

In 1911, the Anderson Steamboat Company offered a "beautiful 25-mile cruise around Mercer Island for 25-cents." The other advertised routes and departures were:

- Fortuna left Madison Park eight times daily for Kirkland and Juanita;
- Aquilo left Madison Park seven times daily for Houghton and the "Bay Route";
- Triton left Leschi Park eleven times daily for Medina, Bellevue and the "Scenic Route";
- Atlanta left Leschi Park six times daily for points around Mercer Island;
- Cyrene left Leschi Park eleven times daily for East Seattle and points on the west side of Mercer Island.

Another small ferry, Gazelle, ferried passengers to Cozy Cove, located between Hunts Point and Yarrow Point.

Business fell for the traditional passenger only boats as interurban train routes and then automobiles came to dominate transportation. In 1917, the small steamer Swan and, reportedly Urania were transferred to Puget Sound, where they continued to be operated by Anderson Steamboat Company in passenger service to Port Orchard. This is doubtful as to Urania as she burned for a total loss off Houghton on February 12, 1912. In 1926, the steamers Bremerton (ex-Kitsap) and Reliance, belonging to the Kitsap County Transportation Company, were rafted up together with the Anderson tug Dart. A fire started and all three vessels were destroyed.

== Ferries on Lake Washington ==
Ferries joined the Lake Washington fleet, starting in 1900 with the side-wheel ferry King County, which had the bad luck of stranding in mudbank on her launching with a large number of county officials aboard. Poorly built, she had chronic mechanical problems, and was condemned in 1908. She was replaced in 1908 with the Washington. Later, the Anderson yard at Houghton built the steel-hulled propeller ferry Lincoln (580 tons, 147.3' long, 43' on the beam, with 12.6' depth of hold). Lincoln was put into operation by King County on the Madison Park-Kirkland run. Later, the Anderson yard built another steam propeller ferry, the Issaquah, a double-ender (288 tons, 114' long, 38' on the beam, with 9.0 depth of hold), which included then-new features such as upper levels for vehicles above the main deck and an adjustable loading ramp. She was placed on the route between Leschi Park and Newport, stopping in between at Roanoke, on Mercer Island. At Newport, the steam ferry Issaquah connected with the newly built highway that to Lake Sammamish, Fall City, Issaquah, North Bend, and Snoqualmie Pass.

In 1913, the Port of Seattle built for service on Lake Washington, the large steel-hulled sidewheel ferry Leschi (433 tons, 169' long, 33' foot beam, 8.3' draft). She was fast (14 knots) and in April 1913, she was placed on the run between Leschi Park, Medina and Bellevue. Leschi was the first publicly owned ferry in the region. To keep his customers, Captain Anderson generously offer free service on his boats Fortuna and Atlanta to the launching of the Leschi. Even so, the ferries, subsidized as they were by King County and by the Port of Seattle, quickly made unprofitable private operation on Lake Washington of private passenger boats and ferries.

Medina City Hall was the Medina ferry terminal and contains some history of the times. The dock which jutted southward has been demolished. An anchor of the Leschi was found and salvaged in about 1970.

The former Columbia River motor ferry Tourist II was brought to the lake and run as a tourist boat under the name MV Kirkland.

== Seaplane collision ==
Seaplanes were new in the early 1920s. On June 11, 1920, a seaplane collided with the steamer Dawn.

== World War II ==
However, during World War II the ferries carried workers to the Lake Washington Shipyard, where auxiliary ships were built for the U.S. Navy, and made a tidy profit.

== End of business ==
By 1922 the county ferry system was in such financial difficulty that it appointed its largest competitor to run the system. The Anderson fleet was eventually bought out by King County. Ferry service on the lake declined with the completion of the floating bridges across Lake Washington, including the 1940 opening of the Lacey V. Murrow Memorial Bridge. The last ferry, Leschi, stopped running in 1950. A year after the tolls were removed from the floating bridge, the last ferry route was retired, and the boat was sold to the Washington State Ferries, which had taken over the Puget Sound Navigation Company in 1951.
