= Acme (steamboat) =

- Acme

History
- Name: Acme
- Owner: Bothell Transportation Co.; John L. Anderson
- Operator: N.C. Peterson
- Route: Lake Washington
- Builder: Gustavus V. Johnson & Son.
- In service: 1899
- Out of service: August 16, 1910
- Identification: U.S. Registry #107460
- Fate: Burned at mooring

General characteristics
- Type: inland steamboat
- Tonnage: 31 gross; 21 registered tons
- Length: 60 ft (18.29 m)
- Beam: 11.5 ft (3.51 m)
- Depth of hold: 3.0 ft (0.91 m)
- Propulsion: steam engine; propeller

The steamboat Acme operated on Lake Washington and also on the Sammamish Slough to Bothell, Washington from 1899 to 1910, when it was destroyed by fire.

== Construction and design ==
Acme was built in Seattle in 1899 on the Lake Washington shore. The builders were Gustavus V. Johnson (1845-1926) & Son. Gustavus V. Johnson was a Civil War veteran, who had been born in Clayton County, New York, and who had established a boat-building business on Lake Minnetonka in Minnesota. He and his son Mark ran one of the earliest boatyards on Lake Washington (established 1888). In addition to Acme, they built vessels such as L.T. Haas and City of Renton.

Acme was built of wood and was 60 ft (18.29 m) long, with a beam of 11.5 ft (3.51 m) and depth of hold of 3 ft (0.91 m). The overall size of the vessel was 31 gross and 21 registered tons. The official U.S. registry number was 107460. Acme has been described as a tug.

== Operation ==
Acme was operated between Leschi and Madison parks and Bothell, Washington by N.C. Peterson. The vessel was used to service Leschi and Madison parks for one year, and thereafter being sold to the Bothell Transportation Company for use on the Bothell run. Acme was also under the ownership of John L. Anderson, one of the most important figures in steamboat navigation on Lake Washington. In 1906, Acme was making twice-daily trips from Madison Park to Bothell, a distance of 22 miles (35 km) from Seattle.

== Loss by fire ==
On August 16, 1910, at about 2:00 a.m., Acme burned on Lake Washington. No one was on board at the time. Due to the lack of evidence, an investigation could not determine the cause of the fire. The total loss was $2,000.

== Possible discovery of wreck ==
In 2002, the Submerged Cultural Resources Exploration Team (SCRET) discovered a wreck in Lake Washington of a wooden steamer 60 ft (18.29 m) long, in 210 ft (64.01 m) feet of water, which they judged to be either Acme or L. T. Haas (which was destroyed by fire in 1909). The vessel contained a small steam engine and a propeller shaft, which made the wreck unique. Normally machinery would have been salvaged from a vessel if possible.

== See also ==
- Steamboats of Lake Washington
- Puget Sound Mosquito Fleet
