= Elsinore (steamboat) =

1900 steamboat in United States

- Elsinore

History
- Name: Elsinore
- Owner: Anderson Boat Company, George Jenkins
- Route: Lake Washington, Lake Whatcom
- Builder: John L. Anderson
- In service: 1900

General characteristics
- Type: steam launch
- Tonnage: less than 5 tons
- Installed power: steam engine
- Propulsion: propeller

The steam launch Elsinore operated on Lake Washington and Lake Whatcom starting in 1900.

== Construction and operations ==
Elsinore was built by John L. Anderson on Lake Washington. Initially operated the vessel between Leschi and Madison parks on the west side of the Lake. Soon afterwards Anderson sold Elsinore to Capt. George Jenkins, who took the vessel north to Lake Whatcom. Jenkins operated Elsinore on Lake Whatcom for many years. On February 15, 1907, another steamer on Lake Whatcom, the Marguerite struck a rock and began sinking. Elsinore was able to rescue the passengers from Margarite.
