= C. C. Calkins =

1890 steamboat in United States

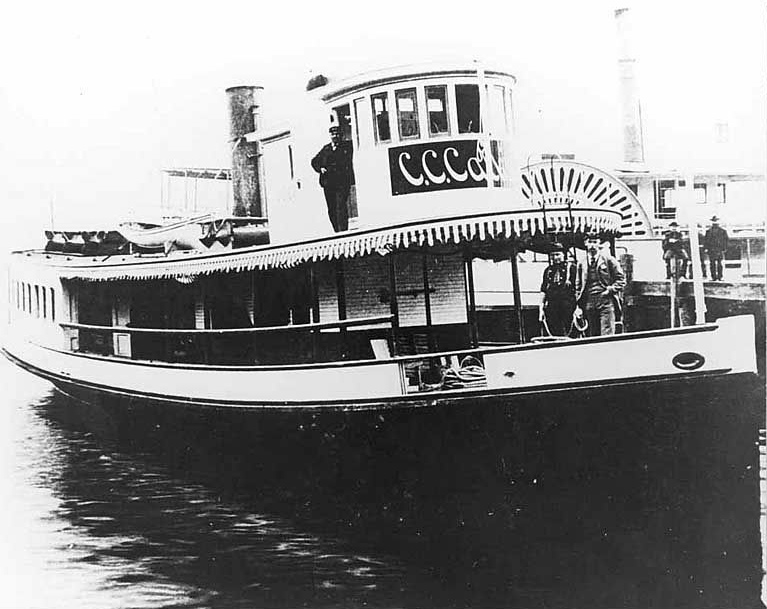
- C.C. Calkins. Sidewheeler to rear is the Kirkland.

History
- Name: C.C. Calkins
- Owner: Charles C. Calkins; others later
- Launched: March 21, 1890
- In service: May 2, 1890
- Identification: US registry # 126626
- Fate: Burned, rebuilt as steamer Blanche

General characteristics
- Type: steam ferry
- Tonnage: 60 gross; 30 regist.
- Length: 74.8 ft (22.80 m)
- Beam: 16.3 ft (4.97 m)
- Depth: 5.5 ft (1.68 m)
- Installed power: steam engine, 300 hp (220 kW)
- Propulsion: propeller

C.C. Calkins was a small steamboat built in 1890 which served on Lake Washington.

== Career ==
C.C. Calkins was named after Charles C. Calkins, a Seattle businessman who was involved in real estate development projects around Leschi Park and Mercer Island. Calkins, doing business as Lake Washington Land & Improvement Co., built a hotel on Mercer Island, which he named the "C.C. Calkins." He invested about $30,000 in the hotel and about $70,000 more in real estate development in the Leschi Park area of Seattle.

To serve these areas, Calkins had a steamer built by Niels C. Peterson, which he named C.C. Calkins. The vessel was launched on March 21, 1890 and formally registered on May 2, 1890. The first crew of the Calkins included Capt. H.M. Race, supervising engineer E.W. Dieckhoff, and deckhand John L. Anderson (1868–1941), who would later become a major steamboat owner on Lake Wa shington.

Calkins was sold on November 15, 1890, and L.B. Hastings became master. When President Harrison visited Seattle in 1891, he was taken around the lake on the sidewheeler Kirkland, with the Calkins (and other ships) travelling as escorts, with the steam calliope on Calkins playing Home Sweet Home.

Calkins was sold again on December 12, 1891, and the new captain was George H. Rodgers, who stayed until 1892. Anderson, who had worked up from a deckhand to a purser, was placed in command. However, because of the fall off in business during the Panic of 1893, Anderson's command did not last long, as economic conditions forced the steamer to be taken out of service.

In 1895, Calkins was said to be "one of the best steamers built on the lake but never steadily employed."

== Disposition ==
Calkins later burned at Houghton, Washington, and was rebuilt as the steamer Blanche.
