= King County (steam ferry) =

Steam ferry ship

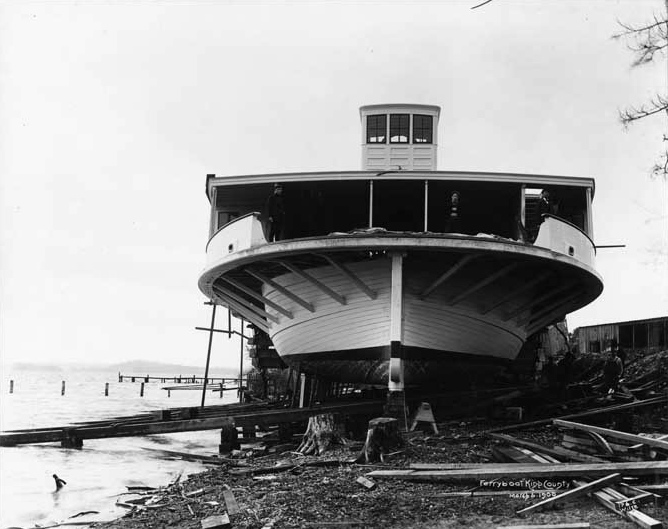
- King County under construction, March 6, 1900

History
- Name: King County
- Owner: King County
- Operator: George Bartsch
- In service: 1900
- Out of service: 1908
- Identification: US registry #161145
- Fate: Condemned as unfit for marine service

General characteristics
- Type: steam ferry
- Tonnage: 412 gross; 252 regist.
- Length: 115.5 ft (35.20 m)
- Beam: 33 ft (10.06 m)
- Depth: 10 ft (3.05 m)
- Installed power: steam engine
- Propulsion: sidewheels

King County was a steam ferry built in 1900 which served on Lake Washington, Seattle, Washington, United States, until 1908.

== Career ==
King County was the first true ferry to operate on Lake Washington, in King County, Washington. The ferry was built in 1900 at Madison Park The ferry was launched on March 8, 1900. A mishap occurred during the vessel's launching with a number of notable figures on board, the ferry slid down the ways but rather than floating in the water, became stuck in the mud. The steamer Cyrene had to pull the new ferry free.

King County purchased the ferry from Moran Brothers Company, the shipyard that built her, for $26,100 on July 25, 1900. King County was placed on the route from Madison Park to Kirkland. The county hired George Bartsch to act as the ferry's captain. When his services weren't necessary for the ferry, Bartsch ran a sideline with his own steamboat towing log rafts on the lake. It was said by some that he spent most of his time doing this, as business was too sparse to justify much operation of the ferry.

Poorly built, King County lasted only eight years, and 1908, the vessel was condemned as unfit for further service. The vessel is also reported to have sunk in May 1907.
