= Elfin (steamboat) =

1891 steamboat in United States

- Elfin before 1896 reconstruction

History
- Name: Elfin
- Owner: Frank Curtis
- Route: Lake Washington
- Builder: Edward F. Lee
- In service: 1891
- Out of service: 1901
- Fate: Burned, engines salvaged, installed in Peerless.

General characteristics
- Type: inland steamboat
- Length: 54.5 ft (16.61 m) or 60 ft (18.29 m)
- Installed power: compound steam engine; cylinder bores 6 inches (15.2 cm) and 12 inches (30.5 cm); stroke 10 inches (25.4 cm)
- Propulsion: propeller
- Speed: 12 miles per hour.
- Capacity: 35 passengers; 2.5 tons freight
- Crew: 4 (captain, mate, deckhand, engineer)
- Notes: Rebuilt in 1896 to increase capacity

The steamboat Elfin operated on Lake Washington and Puget Sound from 1891 to 1900. The vessel served as an important transportation link in the area when roads and railways were poor or non-existent, and there were no bridges across the lake.

== Construction and launching ==
Elfin was built at Pontiac, on the north side of Sand Point, on Lake Washington in 1891. The vessel was 54.5 feet (16.61 m) ( or 60 feet (18.29 m))) long, with a beam of 13.5 feet (4.11 m). Power was provided by a two-cylinder compound steam engine. The builder was Edward.F. Lee. The first owner was Capt. Frank Curtis, whose prior vessel, the Squak, had been sunk in a storm during Christmas, 1890. The vessel was launched in April 1891. Other steamers on the lake, Kirkland, and Mary Kraft brought spectators to the launching.

== Operations ==
Elfin, following 1896 reconstruction, at Kirkland dock.

Elfin first carried passengers on July 4, 1891. Frank Curtis was in charge, with his sons Al and Walter as mate and deckhand. Irving Leake was the engineer. Elfin made six round trips per day, starting at 7:10 a.m from Yarrow Bay (then called Northup’s Landing), to Kirkland then Houghton, and then west across the lake to the foot of Seattle’s Madison street. Fares were 10 cents each way. In the first two years, the most passengers transported in a single day were 180. Average monthly passengers in the first half of 1892 were 1,070 a month.

In 1896 the vessel' s capacity was expanded, and the pilot house was moved to the boat deck.

== Destruction and partial salvage ==
Early in the morning on December 2, 1900, while moored at a dock, Elfin was destroyed in a fire. The machinery was salvaged, to be installed in a new vessel, Peerless.
