= L. T. Haas =

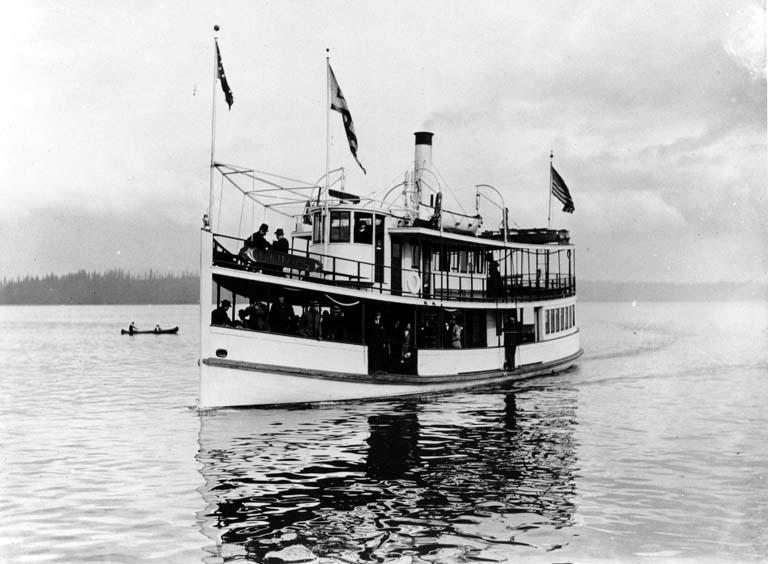
- L.T. Haas on Lake Washington.

History
- Name: L.T. Haas
- Owner: Henry Cade; Carlson Bros; Anderson Boat Company
- Route: Lake Washington
- Builder: G.V. Johnson
- In service: 1902
- Out of service: 1909
- Fate: Destroyed by fire

General characteristics
- Type: inland steamboat
- Tonnage: 89
- Installed power: steam engine
- Propulsion: propeller

The steamboat L.T. Haas was a vessel that operated on Lake Washington in the first part of the 20th century.

== Construction ==
L.T. Haas was built in 1902 by G.V. Johnson, who owned an early shipyard on Lake Washington.

== Operating career ==
L.T. Haas, rated at 89 tons, was originally operated by Harry Cade and the Carlson Brothers, who, doing business as the Interlaken Steamship Company, ran her on the Leschi Park-Meydenhauer Bay route. Later Captain John Anderson of Anderson Steamboat Co. acquired L.T. Haas when he merged the Interlaken concern into his own company. L.T. Haas was destroyed by fire in 1909 while on the lake.

== See also ==
- Steamboats of Lake Washington
- Puget Sound Mosquito Fleet
