= Kirkland (sidewheeler) =

1888 steamboat in United States

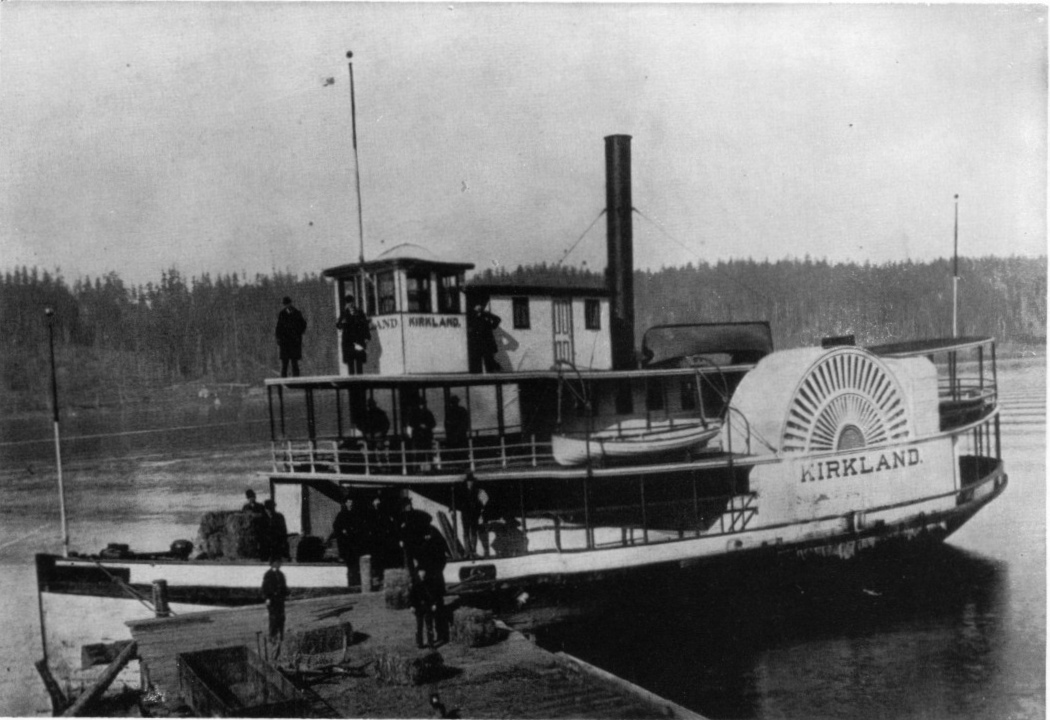
- Kirkland

History
- Name: Kirkland
- Owner: Jackson Street Cable Railway
- Route: Lake Washington
- Builder: T.W. Lake
- In service: 1888
- Identification: US Registry #14480
- Fate: Dismantled, hull converted to barge, transferred Alaska 1898

General characteristics
- Type: inland steamboat
- Length: 96.5 ft (29.41 m)
- Beam: 19.4 ft (5.91 m)
- Depth: 8.2 ft (2.50 m) depth of hold
- Installed power: steam engine, 125 hp (93 kW)
- Propulsion: sidewheels

Kirkland was a sidewheel steamboat that ran on Lake Washington from 1888 to 1898.

== Career ==
Kirkland was built in 1888 by T.W. Lake for the Jackson Street Cable Railway Company. Once complete, Kirkland was placed on the Juanita– Kirkland–Houghton–Leschi Park route. Kirkland was considered the prestige vessel on Lake Washington at the time it was built. In 1889 Kirkland carried the U.S. Naval Commission on a tour of the lake when they were considering whether a shipping canal was possible. 1891 Kirkland conveyed President Benjamin Harrison around the lake when he came to Seattle.

== Disposition ==
In 1898 Kirkland was dismantled, converted to a barge and sent north to Alaska.
