= Leschi Park =

Seattle park on the shore of Lake Washington

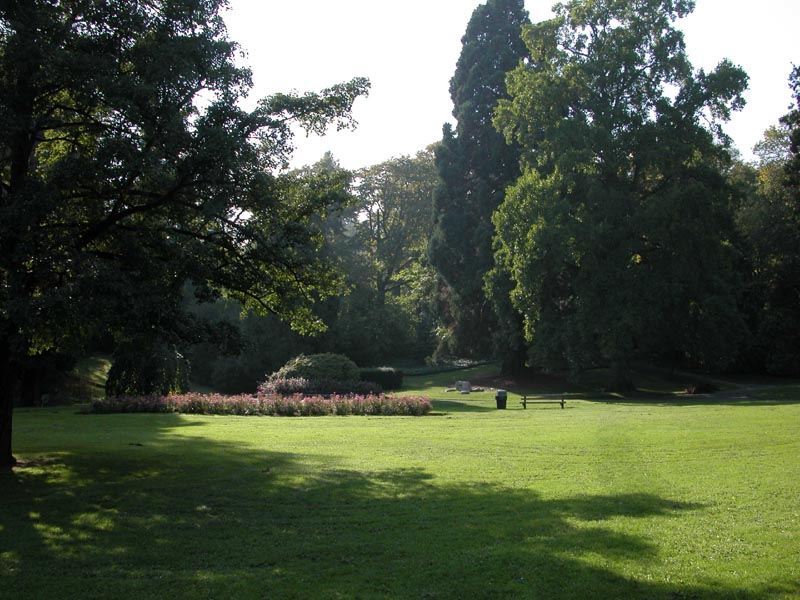
- Leschi Park in 2004
- Type: Urban Park
- Location: Seattle, Washington
- Coordinates: 47°36′04″N 122°17′13″W
- Area: 18.5 acres (75,000 m^{2})
- Operated by: Seattle Parks and Recreation

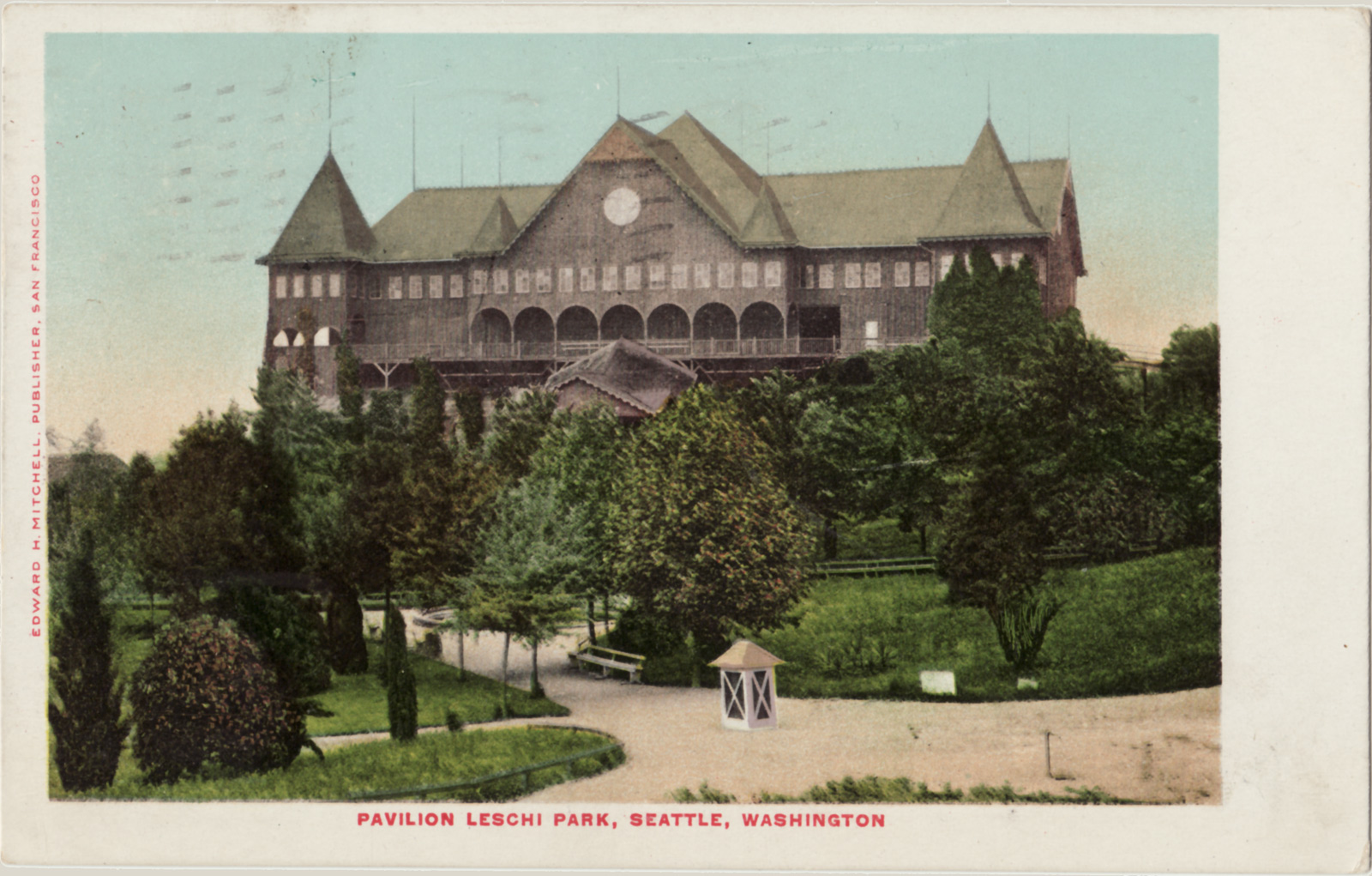
Leschi Park in 1905

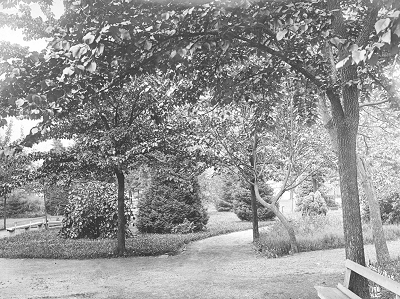
Leschi Park in 1908

Leschi Park is an 18.5 acres (75,000 m^{2}) park in the Leschi neighborhood of Seattle, Washington, named after Chief Leschi of the Nisqually tribe. The majority of the park is a grassy hillside that lies west of Lakeside Avenue S. and features tennis courts, picnic tables, and a playground. Across Lakeside Avenue to the east is the western shore of Lake Washington and a small lawn with benches. To its south is the southern portion of Leschi Moorage, separated from the northern portion by a parking lot in the E. Yesler Way right-of-way, private docks, and an office/restaurant complex.

The cable car run from Pioneer Square that operated from September 27, 1888, to August 10, 1940, terminated here. As with Madison Park to the north, there was a cross-lake ferry run from Leschi Park to the Eastside before the construction of the Lacey V. Murrow Memorial Bridge. Seattle's first zoo was located here, but moved to Woodland Park in 1903. Leschi Park borders Frink Park in its southwest corner.

The Duwamish called the area "Changes-Its-Face" (Lushootseed: s7ayá7oos), referring to an enormous and powerful supernatural horned snake that was said to live there.

== Steamboat operations ==
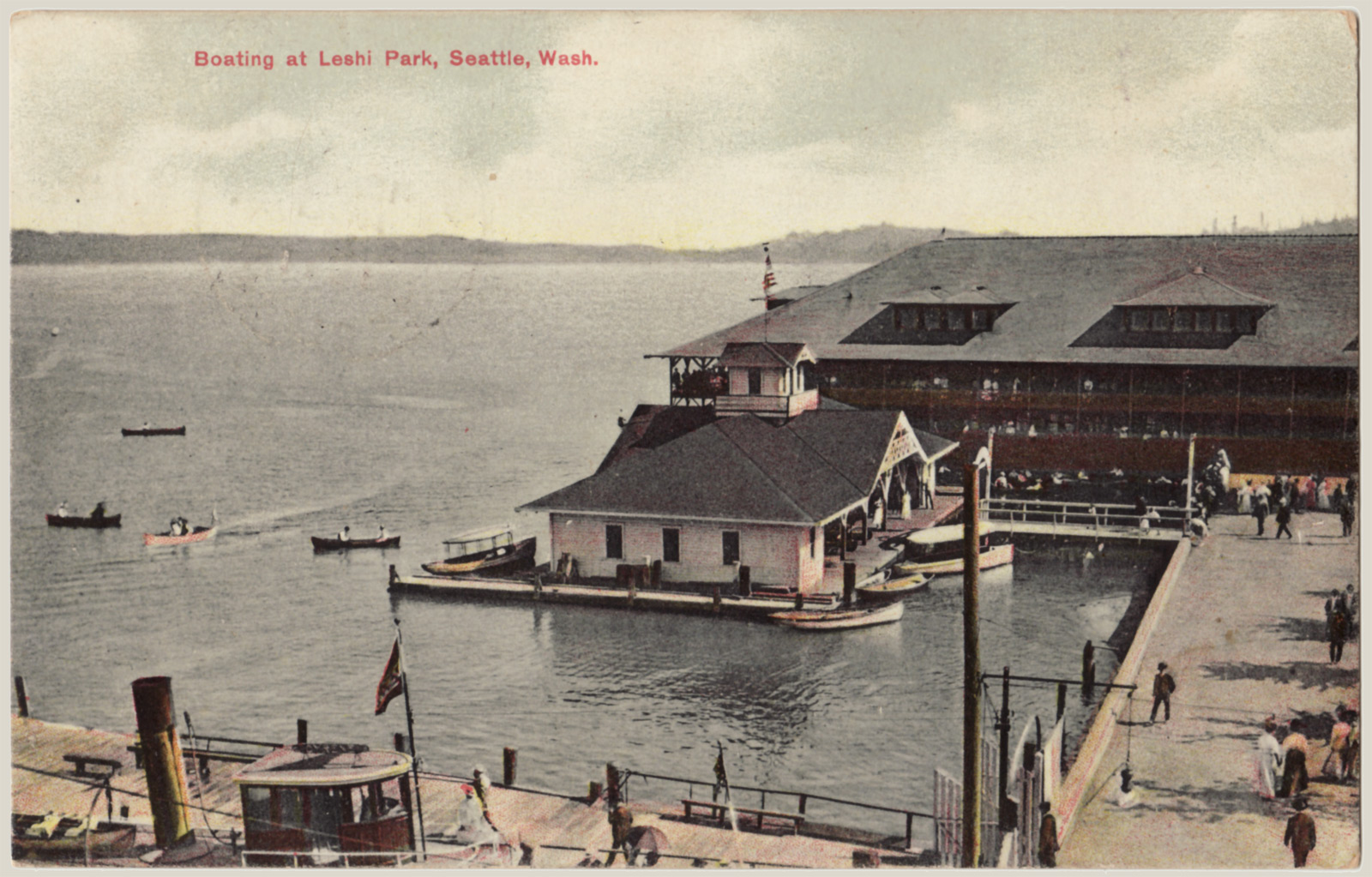
Leschi Park, 1911, showing steamboat at dock and relationship between the steamboat dock and other marine structures at the park.

From about 1890 to about 1910, Leschi Park was an important stop for steamboats which ran on Lake Washington.
