= Madison Park (Seattle) =

Park in Seattle, Washington, US

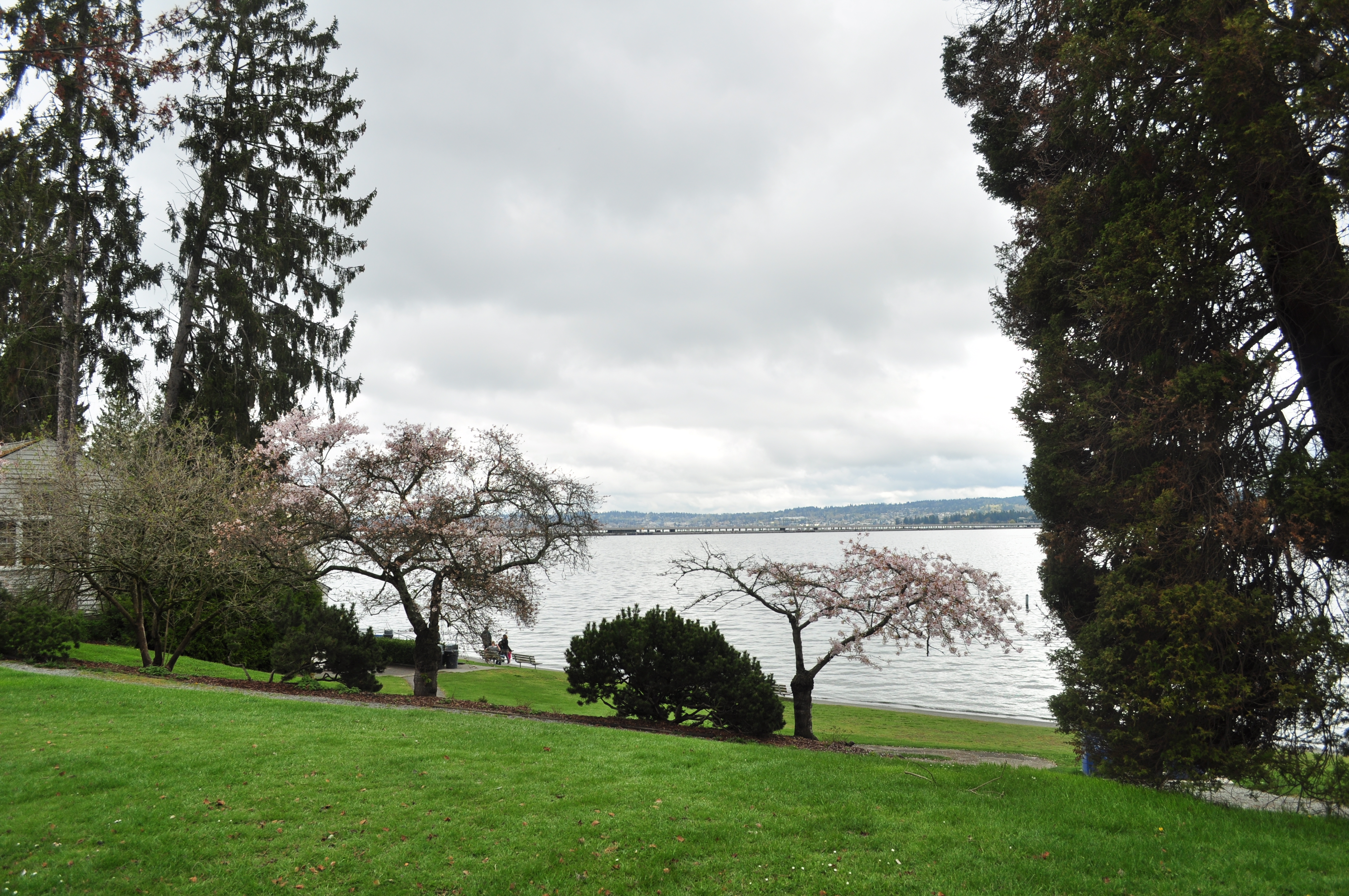
- Looking out to Lake Washington from Madison Park
- Interactive map of Madison Park
- Type: Urban Park
- Location: Seattle, Washington
- Coordinates: 47°38′06″N 122°16′39″W
- Area: 8.3 acres (34,000 m^{2})
- Operator: Seattle Parks and Recreation

Madison Park is an 8.3 acre (34,000 m^{2}) park in the Madison Park neighborhood of Seattle, Washington, located between the western shore of Lake Washington on the east, 42nd Avenue E. on the west, E. Madison Street on the north, and E. Blaine Street on the south. 43rd Avenue E. divides it into two sections; the east is a swimming beach and public dock, and the west is a playground, playfield, and tennis courts. Next to the beach is Madison Park Co-op, a community playhouse for toddlers and children.

For the first 19 years of its existence, the Madison Street Cable Railway ran on Madison Street from Elliott Bay to the park. Service was cut back to 21st Avenue in 1910. There was also ferry service on Lake Washington from the early 1880s to August 31, 1950, from Madison Park across the lake to Kirkland. (The construction of the Lacey V. Murrow Memorial Bridge in 1940 had greatly reduced demand and the continued existence of the run could no longer be justified after tolls were removed in 1949.)

== Steamboat landing ==
From about 1890 to 1910 Madison Park was also a landing for steamboats which ran on Lake Washington.

== Gallery ==
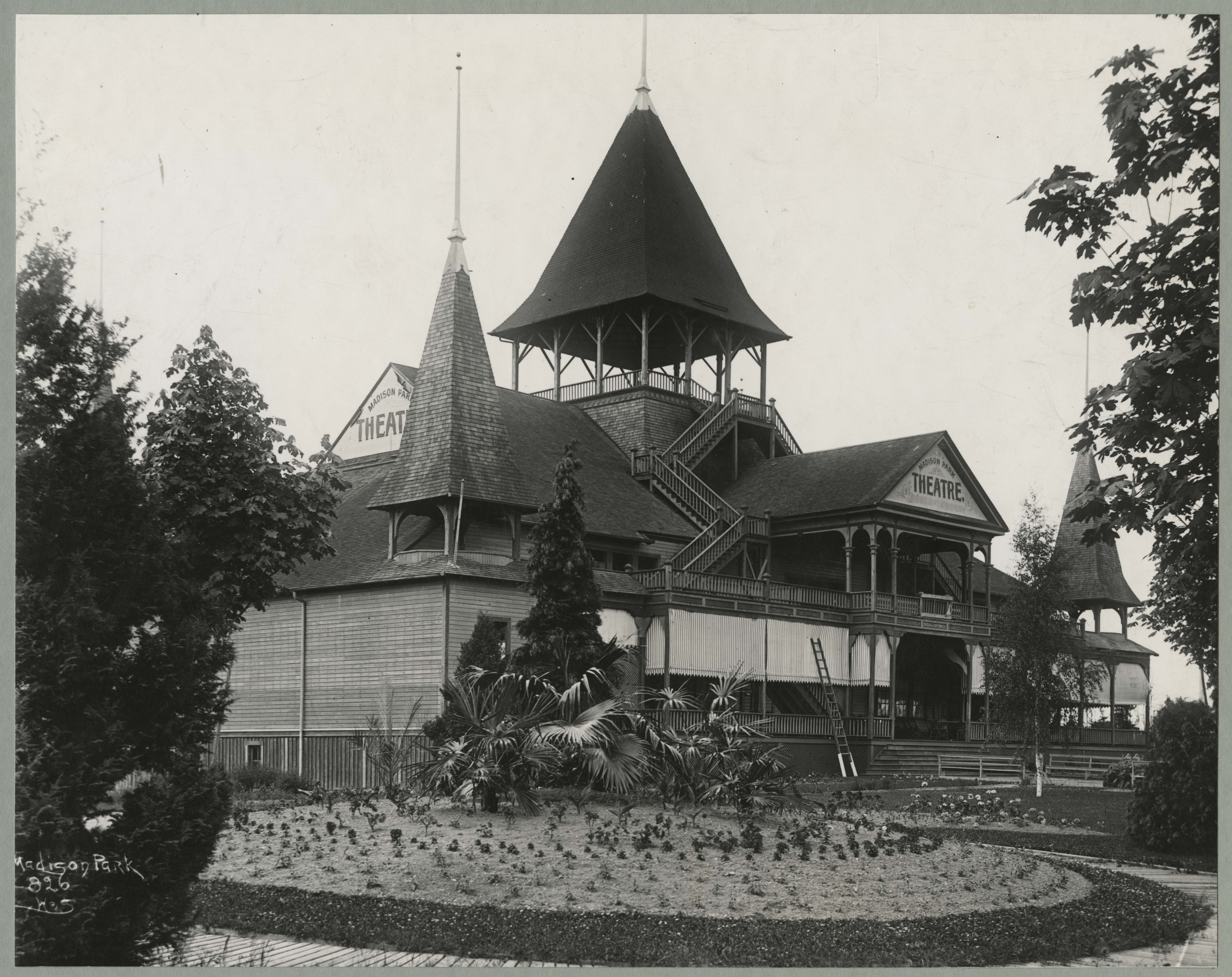
Madison Park Theatre, c. 1900

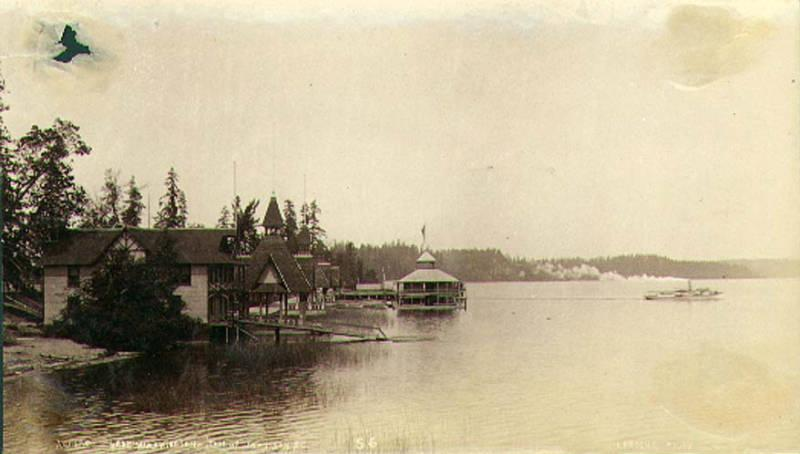
Madison Park, c. 1892, showing steamboat (possibly Cyrene) departing

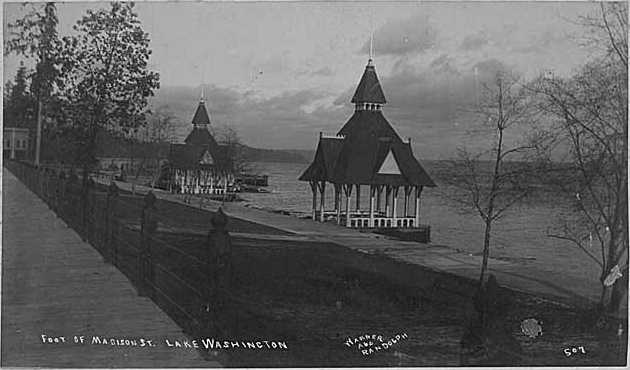
Madison Park c. 1895

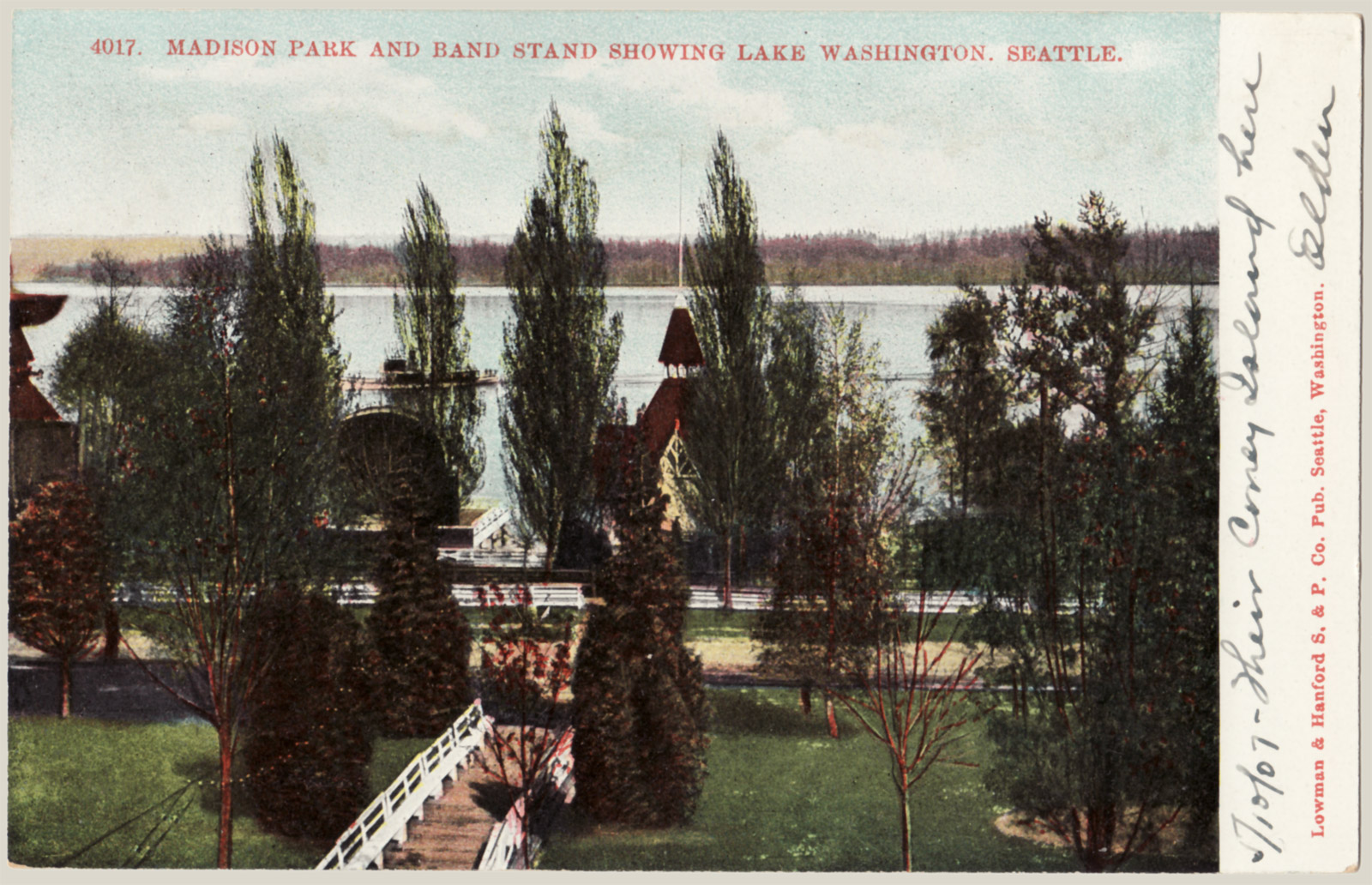
Madison Park c. 1907

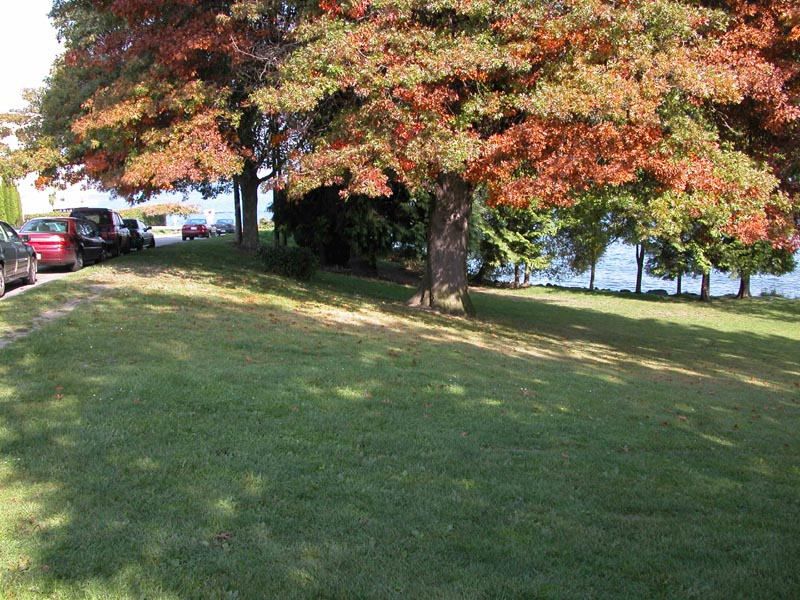
Madison Park in 2004 (with E. Madison Street in the upper-left-hand corner)

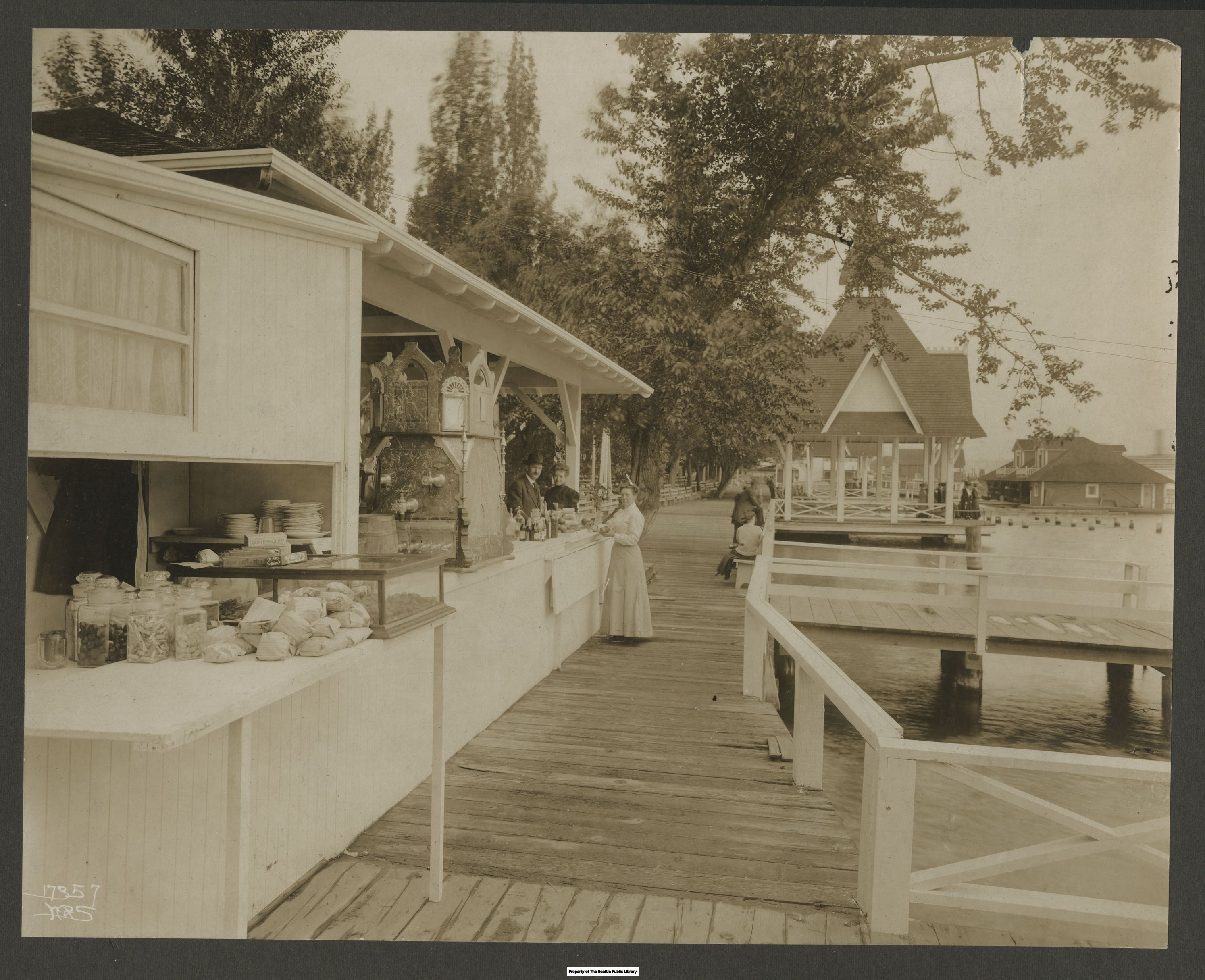
Concessions at Madison Park, c. 1897

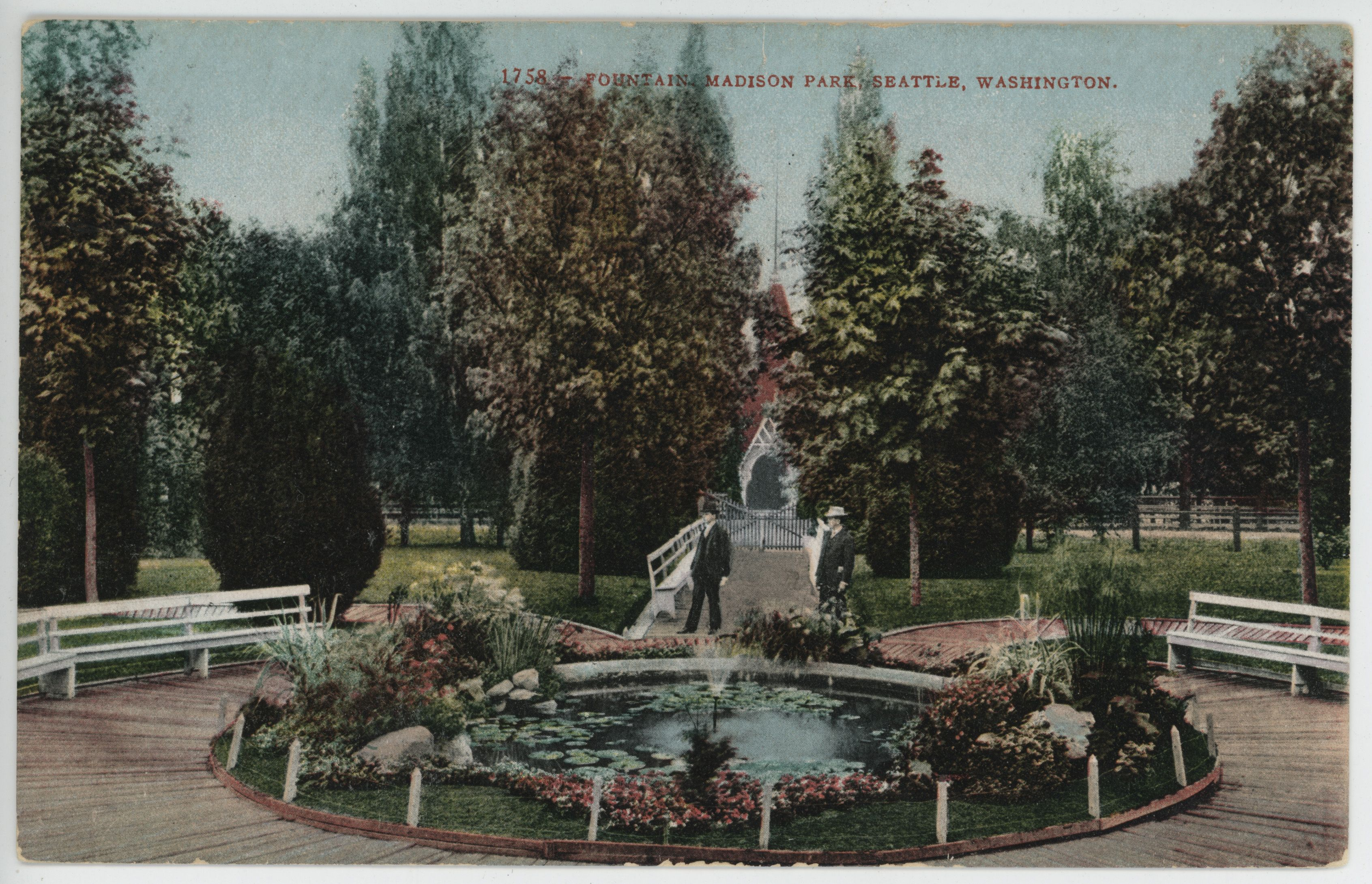
Madison Park fountain and bathing pavilion, c. 1910

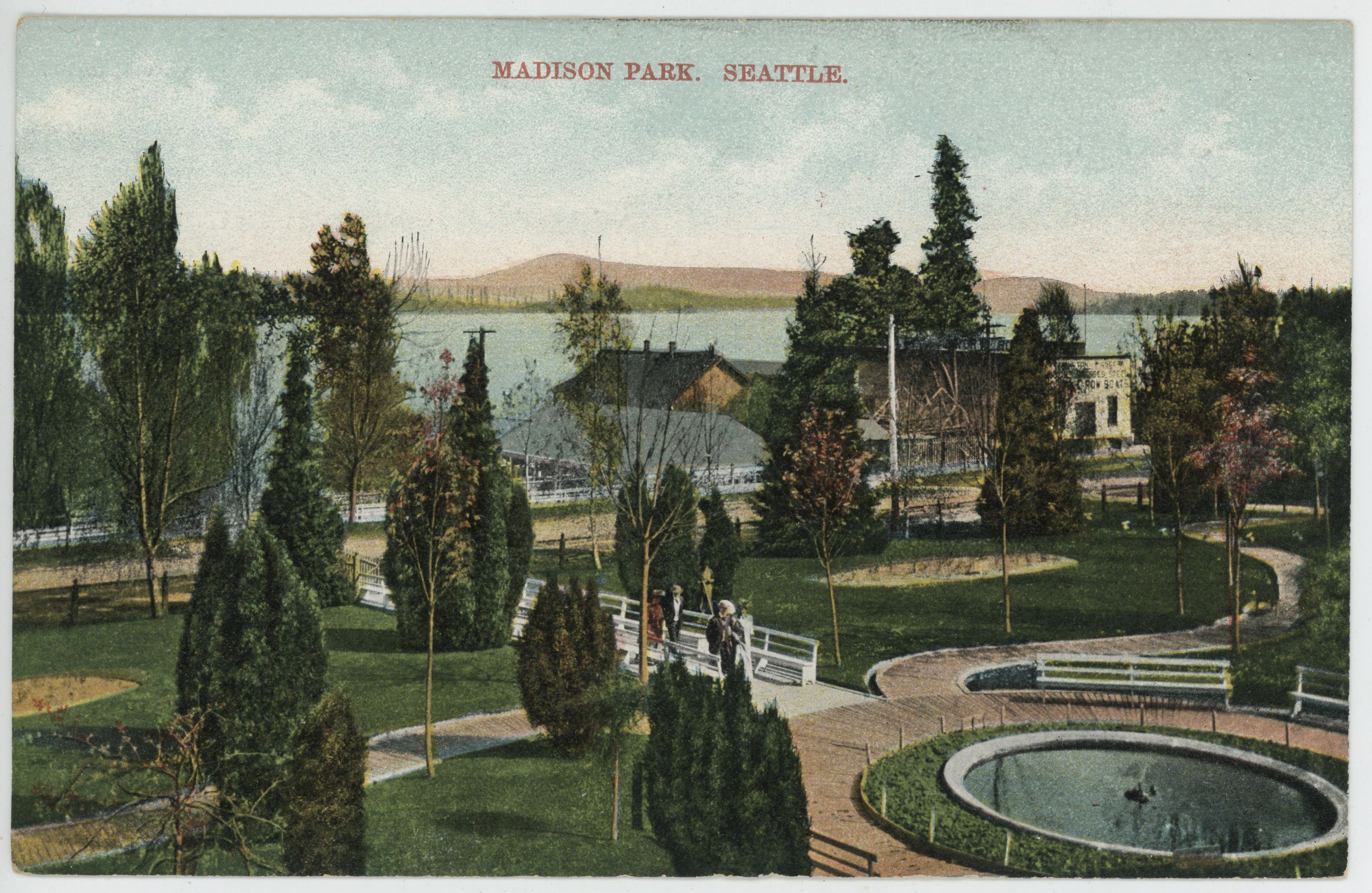
Madison Park fountain, c. 1910

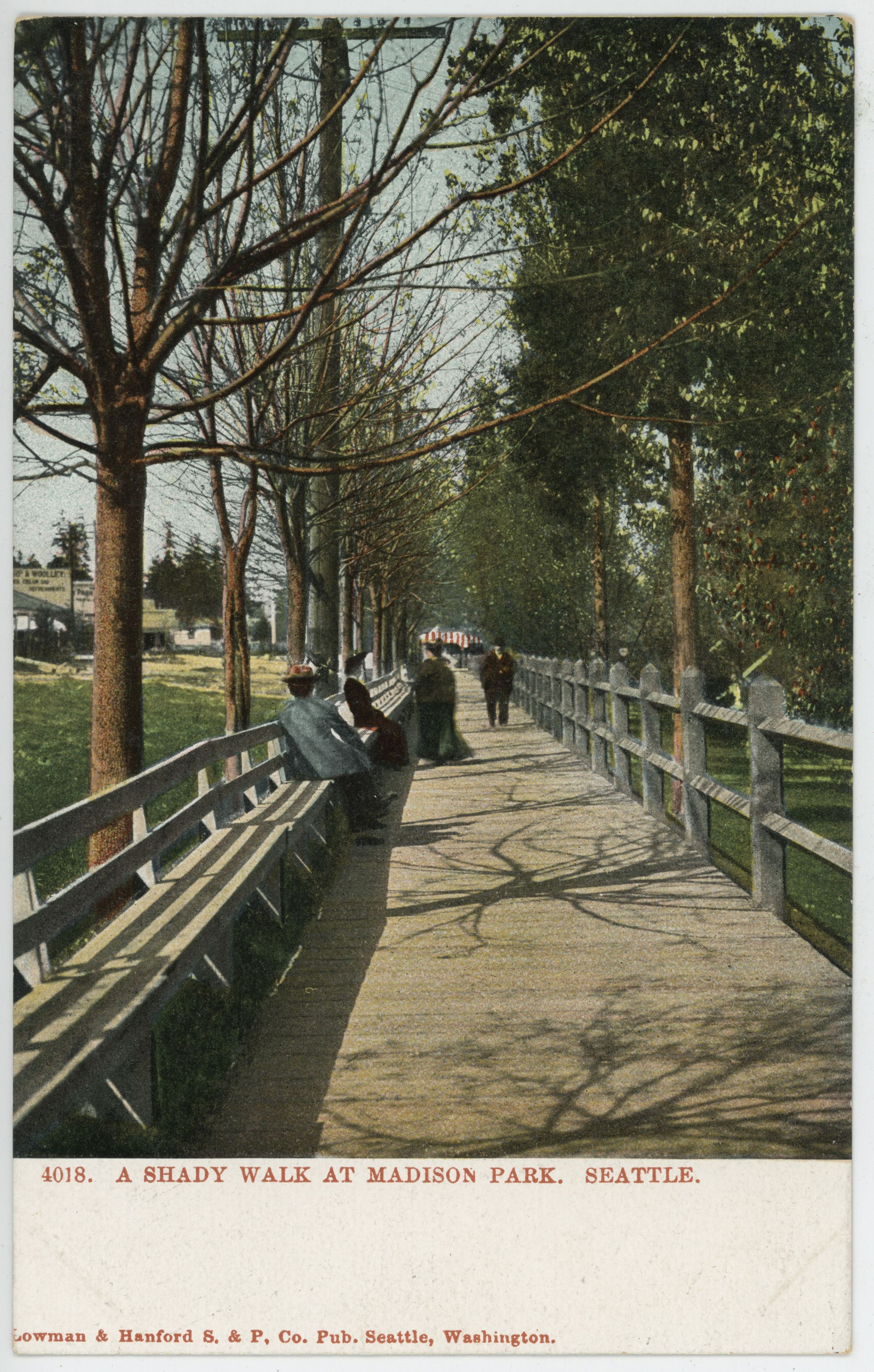
Madison Park boardwalk, c. 1905

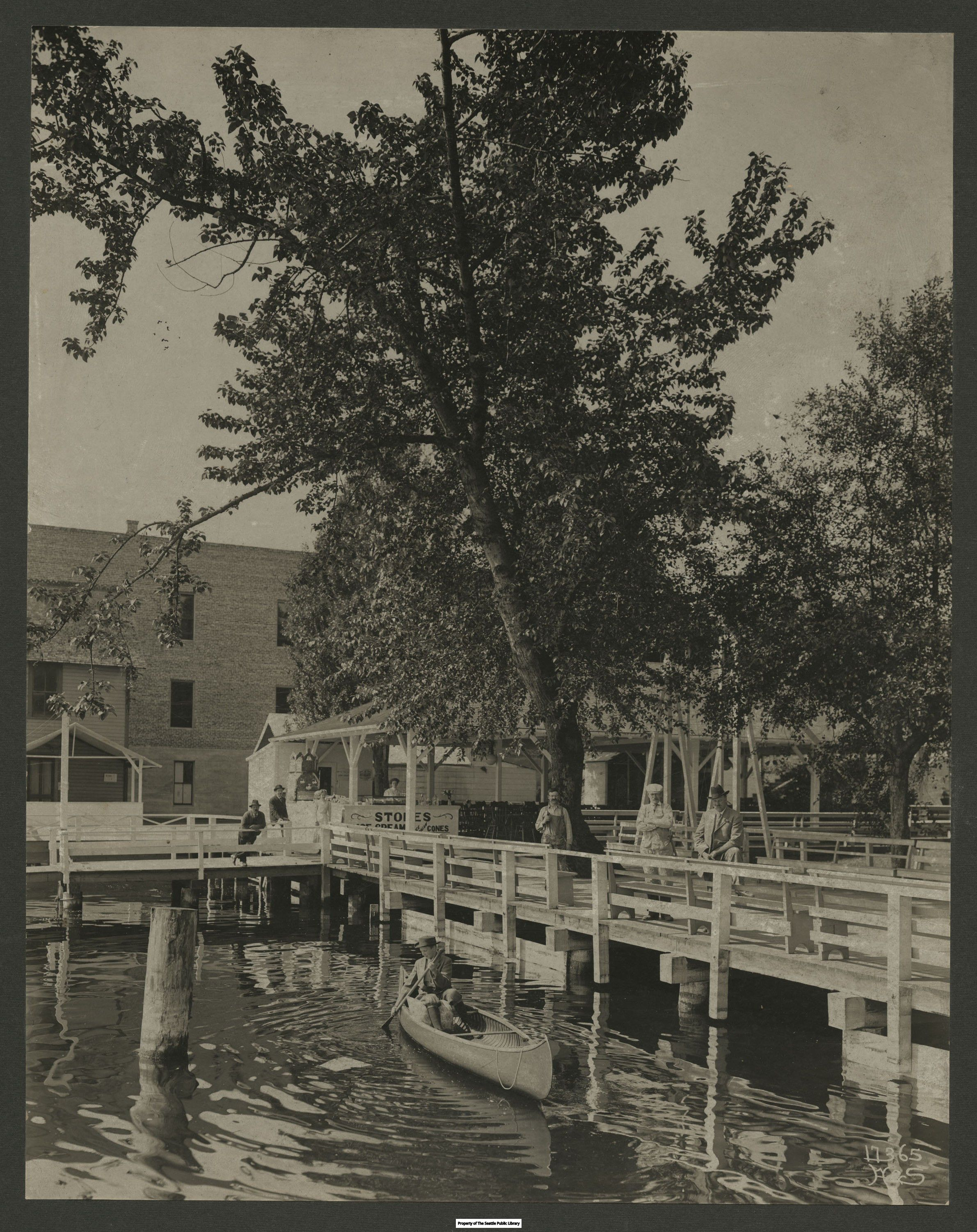
Madison Park, c. 1897
