= List of Puget Sound steamboats =

This is a list of steamboats and related vessels which operated on Puget Sound and in western Washington state. This should not be considered a complete list. Information for some vessels may be lacking, or sources may be in conflict.

== Table codes key ==
Vessel type codes are: Prop = propeller-driven; stern = sternwheel-driven; side = side-wheel driven; pddl or paddle = paddle-driven, sternwheel or sidewheel.
Disposition codes used in this list are:

- A = Abandoned.
- B = Burned
- C = Converted; C-B = Converted to barge; C-D = converted to diesel engine; C-F = Converted to ferry; C-G = Converted to gasoline engine; C-H = Converted to house; C-S = converted to sailing vessel.
- F = Foundered at sea;
- G = Grounded (total loss).
- L = Laid up.
- M = Museum as of 2011.
- N = Name change
- O = Operational as of date given.
- R = renamed..
- S = sank.
- T = Transferred; T-AK = Transferred to Alaska; T-BC = Transferred to British Columbia; T-CA = Transferred to California; T-OR = Transferred to Oregon or to Columbia River; T-CB = Transferred to Coos Bay; T-GH = Transferred to Grays Harbor
- W = Wrecked by collision or striking ground;
- X = Explosion of boiler.
- Gr = gross tons; Reg = registered tons.

Vessels should not be assumed to have served continuously on Puget Sound during the periods shown on this chart; transfer between service areas was common.

== Mosquito fleet list ==
Steam vessels of Puget Sound
Name	Reg #	Type	Use	Year built	Where built	Length		Gross Tons	Regis Tons	End year	Disposition
Name	Reg #	Type	Use	Year built	Where built	ft	m	Gross Tons	Regis Tons	End year	Disposition
A-1	213489	prop	tug	1915	Tacoma	62	18.9	14	9.0	1922	O
A.B. Carpenter	209653	prop	fish	1912	Winslow	45	13.7	71	33	1922	O
A.R. Robinson	106805	prop	psgr	1890	Brooklyn	45	13.7	36	24	1909	O
A.W. Sterrett (Note: Ex Anna E. Fay.)	107339	prop	ftr.	1898	Seattle	100	30.5	181	123	1909	O
Abe Perkins	106794	prop	misc	1890	Seattle	32	9.8	14	8.0	1920	A
Aberdeen (1888)	106544	stern	psgr	1888	Aberdeen	78	23.8	98	84	1901	O
Aberdeen (1912)	209852	prop	whaler	1912	Seattle	88	26.8			1949	D
A.B. Graham		stern	psgr	1898	Puget Sound	126	38.4				
Acme	107460	prop	tug	1899	Seattle	60	18.3	31	21		B
Active (1849)	1232	side		1849	New York	172	52.4	510			T-Mex
Active (1899)	107448	prop	tug	1899	Tacoma	74	22.6	57	34	1949	B
Addie	105447	stern	tug	1874	Seattle	75	22.9		81	1900	A
Addie Valvoline	106409	prop	tug	1898	Tacoma	46	14.0	14	7		C-G
Adeline Foss (Note: Ex Olympian (1907).)	204749	prop	tug	1898	Tacoma	72	21.9			1950	O
Advance (1889)	106719	side		1889	Whatcom	54	16.5	52	46		
Advance (1899)	107469	prop	tug	1899	Poulsbo	70	21.3	93	63	1922	O
Advance (1902)		side		1893		50	15.2				
Agnes (1899)	205888	prop	tug	1908	Shelton	46	14.0	16			C-G
Agnes W	202173	stern	tug	1908	Seattle	38	11.6	8	5	1909	O
Ajax	205055	stern	frt.	1908	Seattle	103	31.4	175		1908	T-CA
Alaska (1899)	107458	prop	tug	1899	Seattle	74	22.6	60			T-AK
Alaskan (1886)	106409	stern		1886	Seattle	85	25.9	155	95	1889	O
Alaskan	106232	side	psgr	1883	Chester, PA	276	84.1	1,718	1,259	1889	F
Albert Lea	106609	prop	fish	1888	Gig Harbor	43	13.1	16	10	1901	O
Albion	107443	prop	psgr	1898	Coupeville	94	28.7	149	97	1925	D
Alert (1893)	107048	prop		1894	Port Blakely	39	11.9	16	8	1894	O
Alert	107452	prop	tug	1893	Port Blakely	32	9.8	12	8	1901	O
Alexandra (Note: Also Alexandria in sources.)		stern	psgr	1864	Victoria, BC	167	50.9	469		1869	D
Alfred J. Beach	107362	stern	frt.	1898	Tacoma	138	42.1	365			T-AK
Alice (1892) (Note: Renamed Foss No. 18.)	106978	prop	tug	1892	Alameda, CA	70	21.3	39			C-G
Alice (1897) (Note: Renamed Simon Foss.)	107327	prop	tug	1897	Tacoma	65	19.8	86	55	1941	C-G
Alice (1909)	206095	stern	frt	1909	Ballard	111	33.8	262			T-AK
Alice A	107203	prop	fish	1895	Portland	42	12.8	6.0	5.0	1909	O
Alida	105028	side	psgr	1869	Olympia	115	35.1		114	1890	B
Alki (1882)	106062	side	frt	1882 (Note: Also sourced as 1880.)	Seattle	65	19.8	65	45	1900	A
Alki (1889)	106653	stern	frt	1889	Seattle	73	22.3	78	49	1920	A
Altona	107453	stern	psgr	1889	Tacoma	123	37.5	329	242	1907	T-AK
Alpha (1901)	107658	prop	tug	1901	Richardson	54	16.5	36	16	1929	A
Alta	106830	prop	psgr	1899	Eagle Harbor	37	11.3	6.0	6.0	1920	A
Amerind	107788	prop	misc	1902	Tacoma	48	14.6	14	10	1909	O
Andrew Foss (Note: Ex USS Harris.)	223240	prop	tug	1905	Seattle	98	29.9				C-G
Angeles (1889)	106639	prop	psgr	1889	Port Angeles	58	17.7	62	44	1920	A
Anna B.	107831	prop	launch	1903	Longbranch	33	10.1	9.0			C-G
Anna E. Fay	107339	prop	frt.	1898	Tacoma	100	30.5	97	66		C-G, R (Note: Renamed A.W. Sterrett)
Anna M. Pence	106803	stern	frt.	1890	Lummi Island	89	27.1	139	89 (Note: L&D gives 95.15 net tons.)	1895	A
Annie Jane	107240	prop	tug	1896	Seattle	44	13.4	17	6.0	1901	O
Annie Stewart	1218	stern	psgr	1864	San Francisco	155	47.2	316		1881	T-OR
Aquilo (1901)	107697	prop	yacht	1901	Boston, MA	127	38.7	176	103	1950	O
Aquilo (1909)	206214	prop	psgr	1909	Houghton	80	24.4	48	33	1940	A
Arcadia (1889)		prop		1889	Arcadia			40	1891	O	
Arcadia (1929) (Note: Later J.E. Overlade and Virginia VI.)	229258	prop	psgr	1929	Seattle	90	27.4	102			C-G
Argo (1883)				1883	Astoria, OR			9.0			
Argo (1906)	203652	prop	misc	1906	Port Blakely	67	20.4	65	44	1914	F
Ariel	209831	prop	psgr	1912	Tacoma	58	17.7	63		1947	O
Arrow (1883)		prop		1883	Olympia	45	13.7		9.0	1912	W
Arrow (1903)	107819	stern	psgr	1903	Portland	157	47.9				T-CA
Atalanta	210942	prop	psgr	1907	Seattle	95	29.0	147		1940	A
Athlon	107610	prop	misc	1900	Portland	112	34.1	157	107	1921	W
Atlanta (1908)	205232	prop	psgr	1908	Houghton	95	29.0	87	50	1909	O
Atlanta or Atalanta (1913)	210942	prop	psgr	1913	Tacoma	112	34.1	147	100	1922	O
Audrey	206401	prop	psgr	1909	Tacoma	65	19.8	75 (Note: 1922 Merchant List gives 49 gross, 23 registered tons.)	51	1922	O
Augusta (1880)	105949	prop		1880	Seattle	44	13.4	25	13	1894	O
Augusta (1888)	106593	prop	tug	1888	Oneatta, OR	79	24.1	78	44	1909	O
B & A No. 3	215162	prop	tug	1917	Seattle	47	14.3	9	6	1922	O
Baby Mine		prop	misc	1882	Steilacoom	26	7.9		4.0	1886	O
Bahada	3957	prop	tug	1902	Seattle	86	26.2	132	90	1926	F
Bailey Gatzert (1890)	3488	stern	psgr	1890	Seattle	177	53.9	560	444	1907	Rebuilt
Bailey Gatzert (1907)	204289	stern	psgr	1907	Seattle	194	59.1	642 (Note: Affleck gives 878 gross and 802 net tons for the post-1907 Bailey Gatzert. These figures probably relate to when the vessel was sponsoned out circa 1918 and converted to a steam ferry for auto transport.)	536	1926	C
Bainbridge (1915)	213253	prop	psgr	1915	Houghton	130	39.6	313			R (Note: Renamed Winslow.)
Ballard (Note: Ex City of Everett.)		prop	ferry	1900	Everett	131	39.9				C
Baranoff	3423	prop	tug	1889	East Portland	54	16.5	29	10	1901	O
Bay Center	3265	side		1877	Elma, WA (Note: 1901 Annual List gives Bay Centre, WA.)	51	15.5	43	31	1901	O
Bay City (Note: Ex Wasco.)	81168	stern	psgr	1887	Hood River, OR	135	41.1			1924	A
Beaver (1835)		side	misc	1835	London	101	30.8			1888	W
Beaver (1892)	3547	prop	tug	1892	Ballard	49	14.9	29	19	1901	O
Bee (1883)	3272			1883	Eagle Harbor		13	7.0	1889	B	
Bee (1901) (Note: Ex Nellie Pearson.)	130900	prop	tug	1900	Everett	60	18.3			1945	A
Beeline (Note: Ex Florence K.)	121281	prop	ferry	1903	Tacoma	101	30.8			1942	A
Belana		prop	frt.			97	29.6				
Belle	3836	prop		1900	Seattle	40	12.2	10	6	1901	O
Bellingham (Note: Ex Willapa, ex Genl. Miles.)	81313	prop	psgr	1882	Portland	136	41.5	333		1950	B
Bessie (1886)	3365	prop		1886	Tacoma	41	12.5	14	8.0	1901	O
Bessie (1907)	204523	prop	police	1907	Bellingham	48	14.6	15	10	1909	O
Biz	3183	prop	misc	1881	Arcadia, WA	77	23.5	80	40	1910	A
Black Diamond	2637	stern	psgr	1864	Seattle	70	21.3		50		
Black Prince	3866	stern	frt.	1901	Everett	91	27.7	159	100		C-hse
Blakely	2833	prop	tug	1872	Port Blakely	110	33.5	175	99		C-S
Blue Star	3539	prop	tug	1883	Tacoma	55	16.8	32	16	1924	A
Blanche (Note: Ex C.C. Calkins.)	126626	prop	psgr	1890	Seattle	75	22.9	98	61	1901	O
Bob Irving	3264	stern	frt.	1883	Seattle (Note: Affleck gives Tacoma.)	125	38.1	176.03	125	1888	X
Bonita	3846	prop	misc	1900	Eagle Harbor	59	18.0	32	20		T-CA
Boobla Mary (Note: Ex USN launch 823.)	223235	prop	tug	1906	Bremerton	93	28.3	9.0		1942	A
Brick	3252	stern (Note: 1901 Annual Merchant List indicates propeller-driven, length 55.6 feet (16.9 m).)	misc	1883	Seattle	40	12.2	52	35	1920	A
Buckeye	3474	prop	psgr	1890	Seattle	62	18.9	87	52	1930	A
Burro	222253	prop	ftr.	1922	Gig Harbor	53	16.2	108	83		C-G
Burton	201748	prop	psgr	1905	Tacoma	93	28.3	122	83	1924	B
Butcher (1909)		prop	misc	1912					1918		
C.C Calkins (Note: Later renamed Blanche.)	126626	prop	tug	1890	Houghton	78	23.8	60	30	1925	A
Calcium (Note: Ex Florence.)	201353	prop	tug	1904	Tacoma	55	16.8			1913	B
Calista	209157	prop	psgr	1913	Dockton	117	35.7			1924	W
Camano	202970	prop	psgr	1906	Coupeville	109	33.2	156	106		R (Note: Renamed Tolo.)
Canby	127183	stern		1896	Portland	76	23.2	59			
Capitol	125486	scow	frt.	1886	Olympia	55	16.8	54	24	1900	A
Carlisle II	214872	prop	psgr	1917	Bellingham	65	19.8	95	86	-	C-D
Carrie S. Davis	127265	prop	tug	1898	Seattle	46	14.0	41	13	1924	A
Cascades (1886)	126227	stern	psgr	1886	Tacoma	100	30.5	191	112	1907	A
Cascade (1864)	5263	stern		1864	Utsalady	155	47.2	401		1870	D
Cascade (1884)	126327	stern	psgr	1884	Seattle	99	30.2	120	65	1901	O
Cascade (1904)	126914	stern	misc	1904	Seattle	55	16.8	34	21	1922	A
Cassiar	125720	stern	psgr	1886	Tacoma	100	30.5	191	112	1907	A
C.C. Cherry	127139	prop	tug	1896	Seattle	70	21.3	54	37	1930	A
Celilo	5262	prop		1863	Celilo, OR	59	18.0	37	18	1894	O
Celtic	127424	prop	tug	1900	Beach, WA	47	14.3	20	12	1901	O
Central (1919)	218611	prop	ferry	1919	Clinton	60	18.3	31		1950	A
Central II (1924)	224095	prop	ferry	1924	Clinton	65	19.8			1931	B
Chaco		prop	frt	1919	Tacoma	64	19.5				
Challenge	127506	prop	tug	1901	Ballard	68	20.7	54	29		T-AK, C-G
Challenger	126339	prop		1885	Seattle	65	19.8	37	26	1891	O
Chas. Counselman	127421	prop	tug	1900	Ballard	85	25.9	123	55		R (Note: Renamed Intrepid.)
Cheakamus	C117153	prop	tug	1910	Dublin	150	45.7			1950	D
Chehalis (1867)	5694	stern	psgr	1867	Tumwater	90	27.4		88	1882	F
Chehalis (1896)	126682	stern	tug	1896	Cosmopolis	90	27.4	55	37	1901	O
Chinook (1889)	126542	prop	tug	1889	Astoria	59	18.0	21	11	1922	O
Chinook (1913) (Note: Ex Venus.)		prop	psgr	1913	Friday Harbor	118	36.0			1924	A
Chippewa	127440	prop	psgr	1900	Toledo, OH	206	62.8	996	677		C-G ferry
City of Aberdeen	126726	stern	psgr	1891	Aberdeen	127	38.7	245	138	1907	R (Note: Rebuilt, renamed Vashon.)
City of Angeles	203193	prop	ferry	1906	California	125	38.1			1938	D
City of Bothell	127063	prop	tug	1894	Seattle	64	19.5	212	111	1920	A
City of Bremerton (Note: Ex Majestic ex Whatcom.)	93135	prop	ferry	1901	Everett	167	50.9			1945	D
City of Denver	127233	stern	psgr	1898	Seattle	116	35.4	279	170	1901	O
City of Everett	127044	prop	psgr	1900	Everett	134	40.8	212	111		R (Note: Ex Liberty, ex Ballard)
City of Kingston	126214	prop	psgr	1884	New York	246	75.0		816	1899	W
City of Lalona	126686	prop		1890	Seattle	48	14.6	19	12	1894	O
City of Latona	126686	stern	tug	1891	Lake Union	60	18.3	19	12	1920	A
City of Mukilteo	226675	prop	ferry	1927	Seattle	104	31.7			1932	B
City of Olympia	127272	prop	tug	1898	Olympia	56	17.1	51	29		C-G, R (Note: Renamed Dividend)
City of Quincy	125701	stern	psgr	1878	Portland	109	33.2	195		1900	D
City of Renton (Note: Later known as May Blossom.)	127044	prop	tug	1894	Seattle	40	12.2	18	16	1920	A
City of Sacramento (Note: Ex Asbury Park.)	107848	prop	ferry	1903	Philadelphia	297	90.5			1950	L
City of Seattle (1888)	126536	side	ferry	1888	Portland	122	37.2	272	187	1913	T-CA
City of Seattle (1889)	126635	prop	psgr	1889	Philadelphia	250	76.2	1411	913 (Note: 1901 Annual List gives 767 registered tons.)		T
City of Shelton	127066	stern	psgr	1895	Shelton	100	30.5	190	138	1921	A
City of Stanwood	126865	stern	frt.	1892	Stanwood	101	30.8	200	125	1894	A
City of Tacoma (1909) (Note: Ex City of Vancouver.)	206015	side	ferry	1909	St. Johns, OR	142	43.3	460	398	1924	A
City of Tacoma (1921)	221831	prop	ferry	1921	Tacoma	113	34.4	197	130	1924	C-G
City of Victoria	106995	prop	ferry	1893	Sparrow Point, MD	293	89.3	1938			T
Clara Brown	126378	stern	psgr	1886	Tacoma	100	30.5	191	112	1907	A
Clara Howes	127532	prop	misc	1901	Ballard	46	14.0			1924	A
Clallam	117769	prop	psgr	1903	Tacoma	168	51.2		657	1904	F
Clan McDonald	126783	stern	misc	1891	Aberdeen	95	29.0	230	118	1902	B
Clatawa	211556	prop	psgr	1913	Dockton	82	25.0	49	33	1950	L
Colby	C116401			1902	Seattle	35	10.7	11	5.0		
Collis	126548	prop	tug	1889	San Francisco	110	33.5	205	103	1901	O
Columbia (1849)	5184	prop	tug	1849	Maine	100	30.5				C-S
Columbia (1894)	127320	prop	ftr.	1894	Fairhaven	26	7.9	9.0	5.0	1901	O
Columbia (1905)		stern	ftr.	1905	Ballard	132	40.2				T-OR
Comet	5973	stern	psgr	1871	Seattle	65	19.8		57	1900	A
Commander (Note: Ex General Frisbie.)		prop	pass	1900	Grays Harbor	187	57.0			1940	C-hse
Concordia	230279	prop	psgr	1930	Tacoma	62	18.9			1958	O
Constitution (1850)		prop	psgr	1850	New York, NY	185	56.4				C-S
Cora				1881	San Francisco			4.0			
Cornelia Cook	127417	prop	tug	1900	Portland	74	22.6	60	34	1922	O
Coulfax (Note: Also spelled Colfax.)	5121	pddl		1865	Seabeck	142	43.3		83	1878	O
Crescent	126896	prop	fish	1893	Tacoma	100	30.5	84	42	1901	O
Crest (Note: Later renamed Bay Island.)	127432	prop	psgr	1900	Tacoma	91	27.7	99	67	1929	A
Cricket	126769	prop	psgr	1891	Portland	45	13.7	77	50	1896	G
Cyrene	126774	prop	psgr	1891	Seattle	61	18.6	21	15.03	1901	O
Cyrus Walker	5123	side	tug	1864	San Francisco	128	39.0	241	154	1900	T
Daisy	157006	stern		1880	Seattle	81	24.7		98	1896	S
Dalton	157507	stern	psgr	1898	Port Blakely	75	22.9	523	348		R (Note: Renamed Capital City)
Daring	206115	prop	psgr	1909	Tacoma	100	30.5	163	111	1918	T-BC
Dart (1903)		prop	psgr	1903	Portland	150	45.7			1924	A
Dart (1911)	208721	prop	psgr	1903	Caledonia	57	17.4	74	50	1922	O
Dauntless	157743	prop	psgr	1899	Tacoma	93	28.3	125	85	1924	G
Dawn	212284	prop	psgr	1914	Houghton	55	16.8	70	48	1946	S
Defender	157587	prop	tug	1900	Tacoma	65	19.8	25	17	1910	B
Defiance (1897)	157488	prop	psgr	1897	Tacoma	61	18.6	85	58		R (Note: Renamed Kingston.)
Defiance (1900)	157607	prop	psgr	1900	Tacoma	93	28.3	171	116		T-BC
De Haro	157541	prop	tug	1896	Fairhaven	26	7.9	8.0	5.0	1901	O
Delight				1893	Seattle						
Delta	157224	prop	psgr	1889	Stanwood	69	21.0	46	31	1910	D (Note: 1922 Annual List shows this vessel still registered.)
Des Moines	157262	prop		1889	Tacoma	49	14.9	32	16	1894	O
Despatch		stern	frt.	1876	Tacoma	95	29.0			1889	B
Detroit	157262	prop	psgr	1889	Detroit, WA	81	24.7	97	61	1910	A
Diana		prop	misc	1860	China	100	30.5			1874	S
Discovery	157263	prop	tug	1889	Port Townsend	111	33.8	209	111	1908	A
Dispatch	157303	prop	tug	1890	Seattle	52	15.8	24	13	1901	O
Dix	200876	prop	psgr	1904	Tacoma	102	31.1	101		1906	W
Dode (Note: Ex schooner Wm. J. Bryant.)	81534	prop	psgr	1898	Tacoma	100	30.5	215	135	1910	F
Dolphin	106938	prop	psgr	1892	Wilmington, DE	64	19.5	824	498	1901	O
Dolphin	157567	prop	tug	1900	Seattle	64	19.5	62	32	1901	O
Dorothy	157686	prop	psgr	1903	Barnaby	64	19.5	59			
Dorothy Stern (Note: Also seen as "Dorothy".)	157505	stern	frt.	1898	Tacoma	75	22.9	126	62		T-AK
Dove (Note: Ex Typhoon.)	145547	prop	psgr	1910	Tacoma	93	28.3				R (Note: Renamed Virginia III.)
Dredger No. 1	157504	stern	dredge	1898	Portland	100	30.5	282	222	1901	O
Duck Hunter	157171	prop		1885	Utsalady	34	10.4	9.0	7.0	1894	O
Duwamish		prop	fire	1909	Richmond Beach	120	36.6				C-G
E.D. Smith	136379	prop	frt.	1893	Lowell	89	27.1	133	115	1901	O
E.G. English (Note: Ex S.G. Simpson. Renamed 1928.)	204649	stern	tug	1907	Tacoma	115	35.1	267	168	1945	A
E.L. Dwyer	136267	prop	psgr	1892	Astoria	69	21.0	64	44	1901	O
E.M. Gill	136260	prop		1895	Vaughn	63	19.2	21	14	1892	B
E.W. Purdy	136029	stern	frt.	1888	Utsalady	100	30.5	157	84	1910	A
Eagle (1900)	136812	prop	misc	1900	Eagle Harbor	54	16.5	40	23	1907	B
Eastern Oregon (Note: Ex City of Palatka.)	126176	prop	psgr	1883	Chester, PA	150	45.7			1891	B
Echo	136395	stern	psgr	1893	Snohomish	70	21.3	36	30	1901	O
Eclipse	136504	prop	fish	1895	Ballard	45	13.7	17	7	1901	O
Edison (1888)	135976	stern	tug	1888	Samish Is.	30	9.1	17	12	1901	O
Edison (1904)	201371	stern	tug	1904	Edison, WA	85	25.9	137	93	1929	B
Edith (1882)	135621	prop	tug	1882	San Francisco	120	36.6	192	136	1908	A
Edith (1884)	135802	stern		1884	Sehome	65	19.8	77	52		
Edith E	135906	prop		1886	Houghton	44	13.4	25	16	1894	O
Edith R	135657	stern	misc	1883	Seattle	75	22.9	110	58	1905	A
Edna	135655	stern		1882	Seattle	59	18.0	33	14	1922	O
Eleanor W	215681	prop	tug	1912	Tacoma	55	16.8	107	72	1922	O
Elf	136985	prop	tug	1902	Tacoma	60	18.3	44	30	2011	O
Elfin	136224	prop	misc	1891	Pontiac	55	16.8 (Note: Another source says 60.5 feet. This vessel was rebuilt, possibly this is the reason for the distinction.)	33	24	1901	B
Eliza Anderson	7967	side	psgr	1859	Portland	140	42.7	276	197	1897	A
Elk (Note: Ex Katherine.)	161007	prop	tug	1890	Houghton	50	15.2			1911	B (Note: Rebuilt as ferry, renamed Airline.)
Ellen				1881	Coupeville			18			
Ellis	136254	stern	psgr	1891	Ballard	129	39.3	325	199	1894	B
Elsie				1893	Seattle						
Elsie C. (Note: Later Carl Foss.)	C117012	prop	misc	1905	Vancouver, BC	50	15.2	33			
Elsie C. II		prop	misc	1930							
Elwood	136820	stern	psgr	1891	Portland	154	46.9	510	420	1920	A
El Primero	136385	prop	yacht	1893	San Francisco	111	33.8	102	73	1922	O
Elsinore	136834	prop	yacht	1900	Hammondsport, NY	47	14.3	12	8.0	1901	O
Emily Seward				1893	Tacoma						
Emma Florence (Note: Later renamed Marguerite)	92849	prop		1893	Tacoma	58	17.7	29			
Emma Hayward	8763	stern	psgr	1871	Portland	177	53.9	613	456	1891	T-OR
Emogene	136818	prop	psgr	1900	Monohon	52	15.8	18	12	1901	O
Empire	8973	prop	psgr	1873	Port Madison	170	51.8	732		1900	A
Emrose	209361	prop	frt.	1911	Seattle	85	25.9	67	45	1930	A
Enigma	135479	prop	psgr	1894	Seattle	49	14.9			1910	A
Enola	201564	prop	tug	1897	Ballard	43	13.1	36		1911	B
Enterprise (1861)	C83441	side	psgr	1861	San Francisco	134	40.8			1885	A
Enterprise (1884)	135761	stern	psgr	1884	Port Townsend	54	16.5		14	1926	D
Ernest A. Hamill	136677	prop	tug	1898	Seattle	101	30.8	163	81	1901	O
Estella	135853	prop	tug	1885	Tacoma	53	16.2	32	20	1901	O
Evangel	135567	prop	psgr	1882	Seattle	100	30.5	164	97	1904	D
Evril				1882	Lake Washington	30	9.1		4.0		
F.G. Reeve	214063	prop	psgr	1916	Dockton	102	31.1	87	69	1922	O
Fairfield	121069	prop	tug	1898	Tacoma	65	19.8	30	20		C-G
Fairhaven	120762	stern	psgr	1889	Tacoma	130	39.6	319	241	1918	B
Fairy		side		1853	San Francisco					F	
Falcon	121227	prop	tug	1902	Tacoma	60	18.3				C-G
Famous	124180	prop	tug	1901	Seattle	53	16.2	29	26		C-G
Fanny		stern	tug	1874	Ballard	65	19.8			1900	A
Fanny Lake	120220	stern	frt.	1875	Seattle	91	27.7	164	119	1893	B
Favorite (1864)				1864	Portland			85			
Favorite (1868)	9835	side	tug	1868	Utsalady	125	38.1	270	270	1921	A
Favorite (1881)	120459	prop	tug	1881	Chinook	42	12.8	14	7.0	A	1900
Favorite (1886)	120663	prop	tug	1886	Astoria	59	18.0	34	17	1901	O
Fawn (1896)	121026	prop	tug	1896	Tacoma	29	8.8	8.0	5.0		T-AK
Fawn (1900)	121132	prop	fish	1900	Decatur Is.	37	11.3	11	7.0	1901	O
Fearless (1900)	121166	prop	tug	1900	Tacoma	65	19.8	86	58		C-G, R (Note: Renamed Foss 21.)
Fearless (1901)		prop	tug	1901	Everett	125	38.1				C-G
Ferndale	120434	prop	frt.	1887	San Francisco	110	33.5	243		1890	B
Fleetwood	120447	prop	psgr	1881	Portland	125	38.1	134	68	1905	A
Flirt	121183	prop	psgr	1901	Ballard	27	8.2	8.0	6.0		C-G
Flora Brown	121197	prop	tug	1900	South Bend	41	12.5	15	8.0	1901	O
Florence	201353	prop	tug	1904	Seattle	55	16.8	51	35		R (Note: Renamed Calcium.)
Florence Henry	129896	stern	psgr	1891	Ballard	75	22.9	130	80	1918	T-AK, D
Florence K	121282	prop	psgr	1903	Tacoma	103	31.4	143	97		C-f, R (Note: Renamed Gloria, then ferry Beeline.)
Flosie	121094	prop	tug	1898	Tacoma	72	21.9	104	71		R (Note: Renamed Adeline Foss.)
Flyer	120876	prop	psgr	1891	Portland	170	51.8	427	280	1929	D
Forest T. Crosby (Note: Later renamed Reliance)	210782	prop	tug	1906	Seattle	74	22.6	83		1924	C-G
Forsaken	129869	prop		1891	Seattle	56	17.1		46	1892	B
Fortuna	202854	prop	psgr	1906	Seattle	113	34.4	81	55	1929	A
Francis Cutting	120747	prop	freight	1889	San Francisco	81	24.7	91	60	1901	O
Garland (1890)	86094	prop	psgr	1896	Port Townsend	97	29.6	166		1909	O
Garland (1900)		prop	tug	1900	Seattle	120	36.6				T
Gazelle (1876)	85474	stern		1876	Portland	92	28.0	157		1885	B
Gazelle (1898)	86419	prop	psgr	1898	Pontiac	72	21.9	75	50	1901	O
Genl Canby	85414	prop		1875	South Bend	85	25.9	89	45		
George E. Starr	85610	side	psgr	1879	Seattle	154	46.9	473	337	1921	A
Gig Harbor		prop	psgr	1925	Gig Harbor	100	30.5			1929	B
Gipsy	10982	prop		1868	San Francisco	102	31.1	215			
Gen. Garfield	85677	prop		1883	Rainier	56	17.1	21	16	1901	O
General Miles (Note: Later Willapa and Bellingham.)	81313	prop	psgr	1882	Portland	136	41.5	333		1950	B
Georgia (1872) (Note: Also seen spelled Georgie.)	83212	prop	psgr	1872	Seabeck	60	18.3		39		T-BC
Georgia (1902)	86624	prop	psgr	1902	Tacoma	110	33.5	225			T-OR
Georgia (1914)	212238	prop	tug	1914	Bellingham	60	18.3	70	43		T-CA
Gleaner (1886)	85927	stern		1886	Seattle	68	20.7	34	17	1891	O
Gleaner (1907)	204548	stern	frt.	1907	Stanwood	140	42.7	477	279	1940	W
Glide	85782	stern	psgr	1883	Seattle	81	24.7	110	79	1910	A
Goliah (1849) (Note: Also known as Defender.)	10744	side	tug	1849	New York, NY	136	41.5	236		1899	B
Goliah (1883) (Note: Ex Geo. W. Pride, ex U.S. Vigilante.)		prop	tug	1883	Philadelphia	112	34.1	414			C-G
Goliah (1907)	204800	prop	tug	1907	Camden, NJ	135	41.1	414	221		T
Grace		prop		1880	Seattle			27	1891	O	
Grace Thurston	86475	prop	tug	1899	Everett	59	18.0	52	35	1938	A
Grayling (Note: Ex Alfred A. Wotkyns, ex USS Grapeshot.)	92068	prop	tug	1888	Lakebay	59	18.0	28	19	1901	O
Griffin	86140	prop	fish	1890	Friday Harbor	46	14.0	11	5.0	1901	O
Greyhound	86100	stern	psgr	1890	Portland	139	42.4	180	166		C-B
Gwylan	86617	prop	tug	1902	Tacoma	110	33.5	43	29	1909	O
Gypsy				1893	Seattle						
H.B. Kennedy	206030	prop	psgr	1909	Portland	134	40.8	499			R (Note: Renamed Seattle.)
Halys		prop		1888	Vashon Is.	81	24.7		13	1891	O
Harbor Belle	96652	stern	tug	1902	Aberdeen	99	30.2	179	117	1936	A
Harbor Queen	96504	prop	psgr	1910	Aberdeen	90	27.4	161	107	1929	A
Harold C	96667	prop	tug	1903	Ballard	46	14.0	27	18		C-G (Note: Renamed Foss No. 17.)
Harry Lynn. (Note: Later renamed Roche Harbor.)	95951	prop	tug	1888	Tacoma	50	15.2		46	1950	A
Harvester	210341	stern	frt,	1912	Stanwood	152	46.3	638	402	1938	W
Hassalo	95591	stern	psgr	1880	The Dalles	160	48.8	462	351	1898	D
Hattie B	203008	stern	tug	1906	Seattle	50	15.2	59	37	1930	D
Hattie Belle	96182	stern	psgr	1892	Portland	110	33.5	207	120	1901	O
Hattie Hansen (Note: Later renamed Sechelt.)	96223	prop	psgr	1893	Pontiac	71	21.6	113	77	1929	T-BC
Hazel	96371	prop		1897	New Whatcom	52	15.8	54	35	1901	O
Hector	96374	prop	fish	1897	Roche Harbor	42	12.8	7.0	5.0	1901	O
Henry A. Strong		prop		1893	Tacoma						
Henry Bailey	95974	stern	frt	1888	Tacoma	109	33.2	271	210	1910	A
Hero (1887) (Note: Ex Klawack)	14454	prop	misc	1887	San Francisco	53	16.2	21		1918	F
Hoosier Bay (Note: Also referred to as Hoosier Boy.)	96409	prop	tug	1898	Seattle	54	16.5	31	21	1911	F
Hope	C88368	prop	psgr	1881	Seattle	80	24.4	78			T-BC
Hornet	96056	prop	tug	1890	Port Madison	37	11.3	15	7.0	1901	O
Hummaconna	218071	prop	tug	1919	Superior, Wisc.	142	43.3			1947	T
Hunter	95783	prop	tug	1883	North Bend, OR	90	27.4	119	92	1915	O
Hustler	205178	stern	tug	1908	Portland	65	19.8	96	73	1909	O
Hyak	206294	prop	psgr	1909	Pontiac	134	40.8	195	118	1941	A
Idaho	12298	side	psgr	1860	Cascades, OR	151	46.0	278	179	1898	C
Ilwaco (Note: Ex Suomi.)	100514	prop	tug	1891	Portland	90	27.4	196	72	1901	O
Independent	100683	prop	tug	1899	Everett	68	20.7	49	39	1930	D
Indiana	100458	stern	misc	1889	Mt. Vernon	86	26.2	107	82	1920	D
Indianapolis	200920	prop	psgr	1904	Toledo, OH	180	54.9	795		1938	D
Inland Flyer	100660	prop	psgr	1898	Portland	106	32.3	151	103	1924	A
International		prop	misc	1898	Seattle				1898	S	
Intrepid (Note: Ex Chas. Counselman.)	127421	prop	tug	1900	Ballard	85	25.9				U
Inverness	214469	prop	tug	1898	Winslow	61	18.6	35		1916	C-G
Iola	100383	prop	misc	1885	Big Skookum	57	17.4	31	17	1915	A
Irene (1899)	100672	stern	psgr	1899	Seattle	84	25.6	105	66	1929	A
Iroquois	100730	prop	psgr	1901	Toledo, OH	214	65.2	1169		1950	L
Isabelle (Note: Also seen as Isabella.)	100463	stern		1889	Port Hadlock	59	18.0	66	43	1891	O
Island Belle	100546	stern	frt.	1892	Ballard	101	30.8	143	60	1920	D
Islander (1904)	201240	prop	misc	1904	Newhall	87	26.5	162	87		T-CA
Islander (1921) (Note: Later renamed Mohawk.)	221640	prop	frt.	1921	Friday Harbor	91	27.7	240			R
Issaquah	211983	prop	ferry	1914	Houghton	114	34.7	288		1918	T-CA
J.B. Libby	13464	side	psgr	1863	Utsalady	85	25.9		163	1889	B
J.C. Brittain	46378			1885	Seattle			97			
J.E. Boyden	76752	prop	tug	1888	Seattle	85	25.9	102	54	1935	A
J.M. Coleman (Note: Also seen as J.M. Colman.)	76703	prop	tug	1887	Seattle	72	21.9	79	50	1922	O
J.R. McDonald	76876	prop	frt.	1890	Ballard	75	22.9	280	215	B	1893
James McNaught	76323	stern	misc	1882	Seattle	87	26.5	146.02	92	1885	T-BC (Note: Renamed Gladys.)
Jenny Jones		prop	misc	1864	Port Townsend	95	29.0				T-Mex
Jessie (1881)	76244	prop		1881	Seattle	36	11.0	11	6.0	1891	O
Jessie (1898)	77298	stern	misc	1898	Ballard	55	16.8	61	21	1901	O
John Cudahy	77408	prop	tug	1900	Ballard	85	25.9	123	55		T-OR
Josephine	76040	stern	misc	1878	Port Townsend	76	23.2	104	65	1892	B
Josie Burrows	77098	stern	misc	1893	Aberdeen	90	27.4	132	98	1898	T-BC, R (Note: Renamed Hattie Young.)
Josie McNear		side	psgr	1865	San Francisco (Note: Affleck gives Portland.)	109	33.2	159	137	1867	T-CA (Note: Affleck gives 1878.)
Julia Barclay	13621	stern	psgr	1858	Port Blakely	147	44.8	325		1872	D
Juniata	77220	prop	fish	1893	Tacoma	33	10.1	9.0	6.0	1901	O
Juanita	77129	prop		1894	Seattle	64	19.5	45	38	1894	O
Jupiter	77340	prop	psgr	1898	Tacoma	30	9.1	11	7.0		C-G
K.L. Ames	213019	stern	frt.	1915	Seattle	119	36.3	184	156	1900	C-G, R (Note: Renamed Skookum Chief.)
Katahdin	161136	prop	tug	1899	Seattle	64	19.5	44	25		C-G, R (Note: Renamed Catherine Foss.)
Katherine	161007	prop	tug	1890	Houghton	45	13.7	29	14		R-Elk
Katie (1898) (Note: Also known as Katie Hamrick.)	161108	stern	frt.	1898	Seattle	121	36.9			1898	T-AK
Katy (1862) (Note: Ex Monitor, ex USS Monterey.)	14405	prop	tug	1862	Eden Landing, CA	76	23.2	93	42	1952	B
Kenai		prop	psgr	1890	San Francisco	130	39.6			1950	O
Kennewick		prop	psgr	1908	Tacoma	110	33.5			1924	A
King County	161145	side	ferry	1899	Seattle	116	35.4	412	352	1907	S
Kinghurst	161175	prop	tug	1901	Seattle	50	15.2	18	12	1901	O
Kingston (Note: Ex Defiance.)	157607	prop	psgr	1897	Tacoma	93	28.3	117	116	1940	A
Kirkland	14480	side	psgr	1888	Houghton	95	29.0	185	118	1910	D
Kitsap	203160	prop	psgr	1906	Portland	130	39.6	195	123		R (Note: Renamed Bremerton.)
Kitsap II	214056	prop	psgr	1906	Portland	140	42.7	258	149	1922	O (Note: Later renamed Quilcene.)
Kodiak	209709	prop	whaler	1906	Seattle	100	30.5			1945	D
Koyokuk	161106	prop	tug	1902	Seattle	55	16.8	14	9.0	1924	A
Kulshan	207780	prop	psgr	1910	Seattle	160	48.8	926	573	1938	D
L.J. Perry	140117	prop		1875	Port Gamble	77	23.5	54	36	1894	O
L.T. Haas	141472	prop	psgr	1902	Lake Washington	68	20.7	89	60	1909	B
La Center	209642	stern	frt.	1912	La Center	93	28.3	67	64		T-OR
Lady Lake	141428	prop	psgr	1896	Ballard	58	17.7	36	24	1901	O
Lady of the Lake	141476	prop	psgr	1897	Seattle	70	21.3			1902	B, R (Note: Rebuilt, renamed Ruth.)
Latona	141095	prop		1890	Seattle	43	13.1	19	13	1894	O
Laurel	141856	prop	tug		South Bend	52	15.8	41		1938	A
Leah M		prop	misc	1910						C-G	
Lena C. Gray	140032	stern	frt.	1874	Seattle	75	22.9		155	1900	A
Lena L	141288	prop	tug	1893	San Francisco	47	14.3	16	8	1901	O
Lena Maud	140913	prop		1887	Lake Washington	56	17.1	51	36	1891	O
Leona	141710	stern	frt.	1901	Portland	105	32.0	145	136	1912	B
Leschi (1913)	211875	side	ferry	1913	Seattle	169	51.5	433		1931	C-G
Lillie (1893)				1893	Seattle			87			
Lillie (1901)	141706	prop		1901	Ballard	46	14.0	31	21	1901	O
Lilly (1881) (Note: Also seen as Lily.)	140478	stern	tug	1881	Seattle	93	28.3	134 (Note: 1901 Annual List gives 123 Gr 73 reg tons for this vessel.)	87	1930	A
Lincoln (1902)	141782	prop	psgr	1902	Tacoma	80	24.4			1925	A
Lincoln (1914)	212845	prop	ferry	1914 (Note: Kline gives 1908.)	Houghton	147	44.8	580		1950	O
Linnie	15621	stern	misc	1869	Utsalady	75	22.9		153		C-B
Lively (Note: Ex USS Lively.)	140973	prop	psgr	1871	Mare Is.	44	13.4	13		1900	A
Lizzie A.	141114	stern		1890	Henderson Bay	51	15.5	41	34		
Lois	213239	stern	frt.	1915	Seattle	65	19.8	130	120	1929	D
Loma	206763	stern	tug	1909	Everett	68	20.7	130	120	1924	A
Lone Fisherman	140623			1883	Seattle	43	13.1	12	6.0	1901	O
Loren		prop	misc	1914	U.S. Navy	50	15.2				C-G
Lotta Talbot	140614	stern	frt.	1898	Tacoma	146	44.5	342	216	1898	T-AK
Lottie	140599	prop		1883	Cypress Island	51	15.5	45	25	1919	O
Louise (1871)				1871	San Francisco			9.0			
Louise (1884)	140620	stern	tug	1884 (Note: Sources also give 1883.)	Seabeck	90	27.4	168	130	1898	T-BC
Lucy	140614	stern	tug	1883	Seattle	46	14.0	18	9.0	1900	A
Lumberman	141583	prop	tug	1899	Seattle	60	18.3	34	19		C-G, T-AK
Lydia Thompson	141206	prop	psgr	1893	Port Angeles	92	28.0	202	101		C-tug, R (Note: Renamed Monitor.)
Mabel	92151	stern	misc	1889	Seattle	99	30.2	157	115	1899	D
Maggie Yarnow (Note: Also seen as Maggie Yarnow.)	92270	prop		1891	Seattle	34	10.4	19	11		
Magic	92538	prop	tug	1893	Port Blakely	67	20.4	67	33	1942	A
Magnet	203958	prop	tug	1907	Vega, WA	46	14.0	32	21		T-GH
Magnolia	203978	prop	psgr	1907	Tacoma	112	34.1	119	81	1937	A
Maid of Oregon	92026	prop		1888	Astoria	91	27.7	99	92	1896	F
Mainlander		prop	psgr	1900	Tacoma	163	49.7				W
Majestic	93135	prop	psgr	1901	Everett	169	51.5	657	276		R (Note: Renamed Whatcom.)
Miami (Note: Ex The Doctor.)	145559	prop	psgr	1890	Olympia	57	17.4			1921	A
Major Tompkins		prop	psgr	1847	Philadelphia	97	29.6		151	1855	F
Malahat (Note: Ex Napa Valley.)	207420	prop	ferry	1910	California	244	74.4	1189		1950	L
Mame (Note: Also seen spelled Mamie.)	91957	stern	frt.	1887	Snohomish	75	22.9	73	43		C-B
Manette (1900)	93246	prop	psgr	1902	Everett	95	29.0	95	55	1958	O
Manitou (Note: Ex Vashon II.)	215120	prop	psgr	1917	Burton	106	32.3				C-hse
Margey	91779	stern	psgr	1885	East Portland	64	19.5	163	117	1901	O
Marguerite	92849	prop	psgr	1898	Olympia	58	17.7	44	34	1901	O
Marion	93454	prop		1901	Tacoma	57	17.4	43	29	1901	O
Mary C	93374	prop	tug	1903	Decatur Is.	71	21.6	92	47	1942	A
Mary D. Hume	91304	prop	misc	1881	Gold Beach, OR	98	29.9	140	83	1970	A
Mary F. Perley	91920	stern	psgr	1888	Samish Is.	104	31.7	185	128	1901	B
Mary Kraft	92240	prop	psgr	1890	Seattle	50	15.2	49		1910	A
Mary Woodruff	17065	side	psgr	1863	Port Madison	63	19.2		36	1881	B
Mascotte	92147	prop		1889	Seattle	38	11.6	18	9	1894	O
Maude	C64136	side	psgr	1872	San Juan Is.	116	35.4	175			T-BC
Mayflower (Note: Also seen as May Flower.)	92318	prop	tug	1891	Seattle	41	12.5	22	16	1901	O
May Queen	91920	stern	psgr	1886	Seattle	74	22.6	86	48	1920	A
McKinley	93271	prop	tug	1902	Tacoma	72	21.9	66		1929	A
Mercer	201059	stern	psgr	1904	Seattle	64	19.5	84	53	1909	O
Mercer (1917)	215484	prop	psgr	1917	Seattle	61	18.6				C-G
Messenger (1876)	90954	stern	tug	1876	Olympia	90	27.4	122	97 (Note: L&D give 90.11.)	1890	A
Messenger (1902)	93200	prop	tug	1902	Seattle	53	16.2	25	17		C-G
Meta	92068	prop		1888	Lakebay	59	18.0	46	25	1909	F
Michigan	91830	prop	fish	1885	Portland	64	19.5	42	21.05	1901	O
Mikado	91826	prop	psgr	1886	Portland	63	19.2	23	20	1901	O
Milwaukee (1913)	211599	prop	tug	1913	Seattle	107	32.6	222	100	1950	O
Minneapolis	92864	stern	frt.	1898	Seattle	109	33.2	235	157		T-AK
Minnie M	92292	stern		1891	Ballard	65	19.8	46	34		
Mizpah	202502	prop	psgr	1905	Olympia	47	14.3	33	22		C-G
Mocking Bird	92119	prop	misc	1889	Tacoma	32	9.8	21	15		C-G
Modoc	214030	prop	frt.	1916	Bellingham	80	24.4	119	69		T-AK
Monticello (1892)	92443	prop	psgr	1892	Ballard	126	38.4	226	175	1906	A
Monticello (1906)	203142	prop	psgr	1906	Tacoma	126	38.4	196			C-G
Montesano	91400	stern	psgr	1882	Astoria	80	24.4	113	87	1906	D
Mogul	91831	prop	tug	1885	Seattle	94	28.7	123	62	1924	A
Mohawk (Note: Ex Islander (1921).)	221640	prop	frt.	1921	Friday Harbor	91	27.7	220		1947	A
Mollie Bleeker	92209	stern		1889	Tacoma	122	37.2	287	239		
Monitor (Note: Ex Lydia Thompson.)	141266	prop	tug	1893	Port Angeles	93	28.3	94	52	1931	A
Monte Cristo	92382	stern	psgr	1891	Ballard	90	27.4	188	126	1898	T-BC
Morning Star (Note: Ex Shoe City, ex Sunbeam.)	116942	prop	psgr	1900	Essex, MA	133	40.5	263	112	1922	O
Mountaineer	91545	prop	tug	1883	Chinook	64	19.5	57	53 (Note: 1901 Annual list gives 28 reg. tons.)	1940	A
Multnomah	91765	stern	psgr	1885	Portland	143	43.6	313	278	1911	W
Mystic	92301	prop	tug	1891	Eagle Harbor (Note: L&D gives Seattle.)	50	15.2	27	13	1924	A
N.D. Tobey	130921	prop	tug	1901	Hadlock	38	11.6	12	8	1901	O
Nahcotta	130793	prop		1896	Portland	96	29.3	149			
Nellie (1876)	130079	stern	psgr	1876	Seattle	82	25.0	100	55.03	1910	A
Nellie Jensen	130710	prop	frt.	1896	San Juan Is.	60	18.3	54	32	1901	O
Nemo							9.0		1906	B	
Neptune	130750	prop	psgr	1897	Ballard	84	25.6	186	68	1901	O
New Western Queen	130773	side	ferry	1898	The Dalles	76	23.2	120	83	1901	O
New World	18357	side	psgr	1849	New York	225	68.6	531			
Nisqually (Note: Renamed Astorian.)	208596	prop	psgr	1911	Dockton	140	42.7	255		1923	W
Nooksack		stern	misc	1888	Lynden			36	1910	A	
North Pacific	18625	side	psgr	1871	San Francisco	166	50.6		124 (Note: L&D give 345.46 net tons.)	1901	W
Northern Light	130778	stern	frt.	1898	Seattle	120	36.6	265	147	1920	A
Northwestern				1893	Tacoma						
Norwood	130812	prop	psgr	1899	Tacoma	95	29.0 (Note: 1901 Annual List gives 74 feet (22.6 m).)	92	63	1925	C-G, A-1931
Occident	155196	prop		1891	Ballard	70	21.3	63	44		
Ocean Wave	155207	side	psgr	1891	Portland	180	54.9	724	507	1899	T-CA
Old Settler	19493	stern	psgr	1878	Olympia	60	18.3		11	1895	A
Olympia (1869)		side	psgr	1869	New York	180	54.9				T-BC
Olympian (1912) (Note: Ex Telegraph.)	200012	stern	psgr	1912	Everett	185	56.4	386	243	1920	T-OR
Olympian (1883)	155089	side	psgr	1883	Wilmington, DE	262	79.9	1,419	1.083	1906	B
Olympian (1907) (Note: Renamed Foss 16.)	204749	prop	tug	1907	Olympia	60	18.3	47	32	1920	C-G
Olympian (1900)	155385	prop	psgr	1900	Ballard	86	26.2	142	88	1901	O
Olympic (Note: Ex Sioux.)	208278	prop	ferry	1924		175	53.3				
Onward	19374	stern	psgr	1867	Tualatin Landing, OR	98	29.9	155			
Ora Elwell	225218	stern	psgr	1925	Sedro Wooley	66	20.1	61	61		
Oregon (1913)		prop	tug	1913	Seattle	80	24.4				T-CB
Orion				1893	Tacoma						
Osage		prop	psgr	1930	Decatur Is.						
Oscar B (Note: Renamed Wallace Foss.)	155344	prop	psgr	1899	Tacoma	63	19.2	23	16		C-G
Otter (1853)	C83459	prop	frt.	1853	London	180	54.9	291		1890	D
Otter (1873)	19407	stern	misc	1873	Portland	87	26.5	124	104	1890	W
Patterson	208757	prop	whaler	1911	Seattle	87	26.5	119	81	1948	O
Pauline Warner	150771	stern	dredge	1898	Seattle	78	23.8	112	66	1901	O
Pearl	150341	stern		1884	Seattle	62	18.9	75	54	1901	O
Peerless	150927	prop	tug	1902	Pontiac	72	21.9	57	39		C-G
Perdita	200077	prop	psgr	1903	Seattle	143	43.6	286	177	1911	B
Perhaps	150515	prop	tug	1891	Seattle	37	11.3	6.0	6.0	1901	O
Petrel	150515	prop	fish	1899	New Whatcom	54	16.5	27	18	1901	O
Phantom	20303	prop	psgr	1869	Port Madison	65	19.8		36 (Note: L&D give 28.11 net tons.)	1891	O
Pharos				1893	Port Townsend						
Philip F. Kelly	150896	prop	tug	1901	Tacoma	89	27.1	137	93	1901	O
Pioneer (1864)		side	misc	1864	Olympia	65	19.8	71		1890	D
Pioneer (1878)	150132	prop	tug	1878	Philadelphia	107	32.6	160	80	1950	O
Pioneer II (1907)	206183	prop	tug	1907	Olympia	37	11.3	17	12	1920	C-G (Note: Renamed Foss No. 16.)
Planter	20424	scow		1883	Seattle		50	47	1894	O	
Politkofsky	20304	side	tug	1866	Sitka	125	38.1	255	175	1897	C-B
Port Orchard	116159	stern	psgr	1887	Tacoma	60	18.3			1940	A
Portland	150024	prop		1875	Portland	60	18.3	32	17	1894	O
Potlatch	210378	prop	psgr	1912	Seattle	150	45.7	575	325	1940	A
Port Susan (Note: Also known as Port Suisan.)	150330			1883	Seattle	40	12.2	29	14	1885	O
Primrose				1893	Port Townsend						
Princess Angeline	150633	prop		1893	Seattle	73	22.3	77	63		
Princess (1900)	150483	prop	yacht	1900	Seattle	43	13.1	8.0	6.0	1901	O
Progress	150571		ferry	1891	Aberdeen	40	12.2	10	6.0	1901	O
Prosper	150781	prop	tug	1898	Seattle	84	25.6	168	85	1922	O
Prospector	159784	prop	tug	1898	Olympia	65	19.8	41	25	1931	A
Puget (Note: Ex Vashonian.)		prop	psgr	1908	Seattle	122	37.2			1923	C-f
Puritan (1887)	150392	prop	tug	1887	Portland	68	20.7	25	14	1922	O
Queen	20605	prop	tug	1892	Astoria	68	20.7	59	35	1901	O
Queen City	20590	prop	misc	1883	Seattle	69	21.0	67	34	1920	A
Quickstep (1875)	20571	stern	psgr	1875	Portland	60	18.3	22	12	1897	B
Quilcene (1919) (Note: Ex City of Bremerton, ex Kitsap.)		prop	ferry	1930		146	44.5				
R.P. Elmore	110856	prop	psgr	1890	Astoria	67	20.4	114	57	1901	O
Rainier	110748	prop	tug	1887	Seattle	81	24.7	179	109	1901	O
Ranger (1856)		side	psgr	1856	San Francisco	75	22.9			1870	D
Rainier (1899)	111240	prop	psgr	1899	Hoquiam	59	18.0	43	10	1901	O
Rapid Transit	110900	prop	frt.	1891	Port Hadlock	98	29.9	192	82	1929	A
Reef	111095	prop	tug	1894	Ballard	34	10.4	12	8.0	1901	O
Regie	110907	prop		1890	Chicago, WA	54	16.5	13	10	1894	O
Reliable	11423	prop	psgr	1902	Astoria	73	22.3	99		1925	C-tug
Reliance	111278	prop	tug	1900	Portland	118	36.0	153	204	1929	D
Rainier	111236	prop	tug	1898	South Bend	49	14.9	27	10	1901	O
Rip van Winkle	110321	prop	tug	1877	Seattle	62	18.9		37	1892	B
Roche Harbor (Note: Ex Harry Lynn.)	95951	prop	tug	1888	Tacoma	50	15.2	87	59	1950	A
Ronda	222679	prop	frt.	1922	Gig Harbor	60	18.3	29		1947	C-G (Note: Renamed Silver Swan, placed on Seattle, Suquamish, Indianola excursion route.)
Rosalie	111022	prop	psgr	1893	Alameda, CA	137	41.8	318	226	1918	B
Rose (Note: Ex Baronof.)	110234	prop	frt.	1866	Sitka	67	20.4	46		1873	T-AK
Ruby (1867)	21869	stern	psgr	1867	Snohomish	65	19.8	25			T-BC
Rustler (1887)	110744	prop	psgr	1887	Hoquiam	53	16.2	30	15	1901	O
Rustler (1893)	111024	prop	psgr	1893	Seattle	65	19.8	47	39		T-AK
Rustler (1898)	111192	prop	tug	1898	La Conner	45	13.7	18	12	1901	O
S.G. Simpson	204649	stern	psgr	1907	Tacoma	146	44.5	267	168	1945	A
Sachem	117173	prop	tug	1902	Fairhaven	54	16.5	36	118		C-G
Samson	117241	prop	frt.	1903	Seattle	116	35.4	328	223	1930	D
San Juan	116162	prop		1887	East Portland	45	13.7	36	23	1894	O
San Mateo	222386	prop	ferry	1922	San Francisco	217	66.1	1782		1950	O
Sarah M. Renton	116284	prop	psgr	1889	Port Blakely	92	28.0	137	69	1901	O
Saranac	115641	prop		1878	Whatcom	33	10.1	10	6.0	1891	O
Sea Bird		side	psgr	1850	New York	225	68.6			1858	B
Seaside	116062	prop	tug	1885	Portland	45	13.7	31	19.02	1901	O
Seattle (1880)	116062	prop	fish	1880	Seattle	33	10.1	13	6.0	1901	O
Seattle (1924) (Note: Ex H.B. Kennedy.)		prop	ferry	1924	Seattle	185	56.4			1940	D
Seattle Spirit	203384	prop	frt.	1906	Ballard	92	28.0	75	51	1930	D
Sehome (Note: Ex Mountain Queen.)	116301	side	psgr	1877	The Dalles	176	53.6	708	444		T-CA
Sentinel	116809	prop	psgr	1898	Tacoma	102	31.1	82	56	1901	O
Shasta	222598	prop	ferry	1922	San Francisco	230	70.1	1780		1961	C-H
Shoo Fly	23979	paddle		1881	Coupeville (Note: 1891 source gives Seattle.)	61	18.6	55	27	1891	O
Sightseer (Note: Ex Vashona.)		prop	psgr	1921	Dockton	110	33.5			1950	O
Sioux	208278	prop	psgr	1910	Seattle	150	45.7	461	266	1924	C-f (Note: Renamed Olympic)
Skagit Belle	241154	stern	frt.	1941	Everett	165	50.3	555	513	1950	O
Skagit Chief (1887) (Note: Later Port Orchard, Tourist.)	116159	stern	frt.	1887	Portland	140	42.7	345	241	1907	R (Note: Rebuilt, renamed Tourist.)
Skagit Chief (1933)	233755	stern	frt.	1933 (Note: Affleck gives 1935.)	Seattle	146	44.5	502	469	1950	O
T.C. Reed	116866	stern	frt.	1898	Seattle	126	38.4	327	149	1930	A
Skookum				1884	Big Skookum			57			
Snoqualmie	116387	prop	fire	1890	Seattle	80	24.4	110	70		C-G (Note: Later renamed Robert Eugene.)
Sockeye	116724	prop	tug	1885	Blaine, WA	46	14.0	14	9.0	1901	O
Sol Duc	210133	prop	psgr	1912	Seattle	189	57.6	1085	667		T
Sophia (1884)	116056	prop	misc	1881	Lakebay	42	12.8	27	19	1922	O
Sophia (1898)		prop	psgr	1898		100	30.5			1923	A
Sound (Note: Later renamed Carl Foss)	210814	prop	tug	1912	Anacortes	52	15.8	50	34	1922	O
St. Patrick	115359	prop		1879	Waterford, WA			22			
St. Paul	203615	stern	frt.	1906	Trinidad	116	35.4	208	131	1930	A
Squak		prop		1884	Lake Washington		37	19	1891	O	
Stampede				1893	Seattle						
Startling	116807	prop	psgr	1898	Tacoma	53	16.2	15	10	1913	B
Steelhead	116836	prop	tug	1898	Fairhaven	56	17.1	38	26	1901	O
State of Washington	116272	stern	psgr	1889	Tacoma	175	53.3	605	449	1920	X
Succeed	116543	prop	fish	1892	Seattle	29	8.8	9.0	5.0	1901	O
Success (1868)	23759	prop	tug	1868	Port Blakely	46	14.0	13	6.0	1901	O
Success (1888)		prop		1888	Utsalady			7.0	1891	O	
Susy (Note: Also spelled Susie.)	115684	prop		1879	Seattle	56	17.1	59	42	1891	O
Swan (1868)				1868	Tacoma			4.0			
Swinomish	200504	stern	tug	1903	La Conner	92	28.0	116	105	1903	C
T.C. Reed (1897)	145744	stern	frt.	1897	Aberdeen	116	35.4	166	149	1918	Rebuilt
T.C. Reed (rebuilt)	216193	stern	frt.	1918	Seattle	109	33.2	277	209	1949	A
T.J. Potter	145489	side	psgr	1888	Portland	234	71.3	659	590	1900	Rebuilt
T.J. Potter (rebuilt)	145489	side	psgr	1900	Portland	234	71.3	1107	676	1921	A
T.W. Lake	145700	prop	frt.	1895	Ballard	97	29.6	191	130	1923	F
Tacoma (1884)	145382	prop	ferry	1884	Portland	334	101.8	1,362	1,311		C-B
Tacoma (1913)	211198	prop	psgr	1913	Seattle	215	65.5	836	458	1938	D
Telegraph (1893)				1893	Seattle						
Telegraph (1903) (Note: Ex Skagit Chief.)	200012	stern	psgr	1903	Everett	185	56.4	386 (Note: Marine Blue Book gives 868)	243	1912	W, R (Note: Wrecked, rebuilt, renamed Olympian.)
Tempest	145871	prop	psgr	1901	Everett	65	19.8	54	26	1901	O
The Doctor	145559	prop	misc	1890	Olympia	57	17.4	28	15	20	R (Note: Renamed Miami.)
Thistle	145632	prop	psgr	1892	Hoquiam	47	14.3	18	9.0	1901	O
Thurow	213841	prop	misc	1915	Lakebay	45	13.7	48	39	1927	C-G
Tillie	145337	prop	psgr	1883	Seattle	46	14.0	34	17		T-GB
Tolo (1887)		prop	psgr	1887	Eagle Harbor	75	22.9	8.0		1907	W
Tolo (1904)	201341	prop	misc	1904	Seattle	77	23.5	35	22	1915	A
Tolo (1906) (Note: Ex Camano.)	202970	prop	psgr	1906	Coupeville	120	36.6			1917	W
Tonquin	145459	prop	frt.	1887	Astoria	64	19.5	91	53	1901	O
Tourist (Note: Ex Skagit Chief.)	203932	stern	psgr	1907	Tacoma	157	47.9	345 (Note: Marine Blue Book gives 467.)	241		C-G
Transport	145833	prop	frt.	1899	Olympia	111	33.8	99	52	1911	F
Triton	206216	prop	psgr	1909	Houghton	78	23.8	35	27	1930	D
Triumph	145522	stern		1889	Sehome	50	15.2			1892	B
Traveler		prop	psgr	1851	Philadelphia	85	25.9			1858	F
Trio	209486	prop	tug	1911	Decatur Is.	52	15.8	37	18	1922	O
Tussler	145814	prop	tug	1899	Olympia	45	13.7	18	12	1901	O
Tyconda	145889	stern	frt.	1901	Tacoma	104	31.7	186	117	1915	T-AK
Typhoon (1889)	145547	prop	psgr	1889	Portland	75	22.9	71	48	1901	O
Typhoon (1910)	207184	prop	psgr	1910	Tacoma	93	28.3	91			R (Note: Later Dove and Virginia III.)
Tyrus	2000681	prop	psgr	1904	Tacoma	98	29.9				R (Note: Renamed Virginia IV.)
Union	25313	prop	psgr	1898	Seattle	52	15.8	19	11	1901	O
Utsalady	25257	stern	tug	1884	Utsalady	57	17.4	44	33	1910	D
Utopia	25295	prop	psgr	1893	Seattle	123	37.5	424	351	1922	A
Urania (Note: Ex Wm. E. Reis.)	204149	prop	psgr	1907	Seattle	58	17.7			1943	A
Varuna	25799	prop	psgr	1869	Port Orchard	70	21.3	37			T-BC
Vashon (1905)	201956	prop	psgr	1906	Dockton	94	28.7	100	68	1930	D
Vashon (1907)	126766	stern	psgr	1907	Aberdeen	127	38.7	244	138	1911	B
Vashon II	215120	prop	psgr	1906	Burton	106	32.3	99	56	1922	O (Note: Later renamed Manitou, operational until at least 1937.)
Vashonian	205849	prop	psgr	1908	Seattle	122	37.2	234			R (Note: Renamed Puget.)
Venus	204019	prop	psgr	1907	Friday Harbor	118	36.0	149	101		R (Note: Renamed Chinook.)
Vera	161813	prop	stern	1898	Seattle	49	14.9	53	27	1901	O
Vermont	161888	prop	psgr	1901	Seattle	107	32.6	121	82	1901	O
Verona	207675	prop	psgr	1910	Dockton	112	34.1	113		1940	D
Victor	161707	prop	tug	1893	Seattle	59	18.0	40	27		C-G
Victor II		prop	psgr	1914					1924	F	
Victorian (1898)	161655	prop	psgr	1891	Portland	242	73.8	1,503	809		C
Vigilant	161743	prop	tug	1896	Ballard	58	17.7	50	34	1901	O
Vigilant (1907)	204707	prop	tug	1907	Tacoma	65	19.8	70	48	1922	O
Violet	161566	prop	tug	1887	Seattle	35	10.7	12	9.0 (Note: 1901 Annual List gives 6.0 registered tons.)	O	1891
Virgil T. Price	161647	prop	psgr	1891	Eagle Harbor	44	13.4	31	21	1894	B
Virginia (1875)	25923	prop		1875	San Francisco	44	13.4	14	10	1891	O
Virginia II (1912)		prop	psgr	1912	Tacoma	77	23.5	78	53		N (Note: Renamed Kingsmill.)
Virginia III (Note: Ex Typhoon (built 1910 at Tacoma).)	207184	prop	psgr	1910	Tacoma	93	28.3			1927	R (Note: Renamed Narada.)
Virginia IV (Note: Ex Tyrus.)	200681	prop	psgr	1904	Tacoma	98	29.9	85	43	1922	O
Virginia V	222170	prop	psgr	1922	Lisabuela	110	33.5	122	83	2011	O
Virjo Young		prop	tug	1912	Winslow	59	18.0				C-G
W.E. Harrington (Note: Later known as City of Bothell.)	81741	prop	psgr	1901	Everett	57	17.4	33	22	1901	O
W. K. Merwin	80959	stern	frt.	1883	Seattle	108	32.9	229.08	166.04	1900	W
W.T. Preston		stern	snag	1915	Winslow	161	49.1	275		1981	M
Walrus	81746	prop		1901	Ballard	42	12.8	13	8.0	1901	O
Walsh	81601	stern	ftr.	1898	Port Blakely	150	45.7	523	348	1903	B
Warrior	81772	prop	tug	1901	Wilmington, CA	102	31.1	122	83	1909	O
Wasco	81168	prop	psgr	1887	Hood River, OR	135	41.1	250	215		R (Note: Renamed Bay City.)
Wasp	81257	prop	tug	1890	Eagle Harbor	51	15.5	25	15		C-G
Washington (1881)	80815	stern	psgr	1881	Vancouver, WA	142	43.3	292	193.08	1900	A
Washington (1908)	203354	prop	psgr	1908	Seattle	160	48.8	539	367	1947	D
Water Lily		side		1854	San Francisco	49	14.9			1855	F
Waialeale (Note: Ex schooner Kauai.)	14445	prop	psgr	1886	Port Blakely	123	37.5	342	232	1929	A
Welcome	80537	stern	psgr	1874	Portland	127	38.7	327	251	1900	D
Wenat	80026	stern	frt.	1868	Portland	77	23.5	87		1898	T-AK
West Seattle	203946	side	ferry	1907	Tacoma	140	42.7	773	487		C-B
Whatcom (Note: Ex Majestic.)	93155	prop	psgr	1901	Everett	120	36.6	716	487	1921	C-f (Note: Renamed City of Bremerton.)
Whidby (1907)	204303	prop	psgr	1907	Coupeville	110	33.5	192	130	1911	B
Whidby (1923) (Note: Renamed Rosario.) (Note: Newell, Ships of the Inland Sea, at page 216, gives length as 120 feet, almost certainly an error.)	223051	prop	ferry	1923	Dockton	114	34.7	209	142	1921	C-D
Wildwood	81022	prop	psgr	1883	Rainier	115	35.1	53	27	1902	A
Willapa (Note: Ex General Miles.)	81313	prop	psgr	1882	Portland	136	41.5	334	250	1894	O (Note: Later renamed Bellingham.)
Willie	80974	stern	psgr	1883	Seattle	67	20.4	83	56	1905	A
Wilson G. Hunt	26713; C83455	side	psgr	1845	New York	185	56.4	461		1878	T-BC
Winnifred	81415	prop	psgr	1892	Seattle	46	14.0	26	13	1894	O
Winslow		prop	psgr	1915	Seattle	120	36.6			1940	A
Wm. E. Reis	204149	prop	psgr	1907	Seattle	95	29.0				R (Note: Renamed Urania.)
Wm. F. Monroe	81009	stern	misc	1883	Seattle	105	32.0	181	100	1896	W
Wyadda	81850	prop	tug	1902	Seattle	86	26.2	132	90	1940	A
Xanthus	27023	prop	psgr	1901	Seattle	83	25.3	49	34	1921	A
Yakima (1874) (Note: Also seen as Yakitna.)	27601	side	tug	1874	Port Gamble	117	35.7	173		1900	O
Yosemite	27550; C83455	side	psgr	1862	San Francisco	282	86.0	1525		1909	W
Yellow Jacket	27677	prop	tug	1900	Seattle	67	20.4	60	28	1900	C-G
Zephyr	28074	stern	misc	1871	Seattle	100	30.5	162	110	1907	D
Beatrice Baer	209733	prop	frt.	1912	Anacortes	67	20.4	89	60	1922	O
Bremerton (Note: Ex Inland Flyer.)	203160	prop	pass.	1906	Portland	128	39.0	195	123	1922	O
Beatrice Baer	209733	prop	frt.	1912	Anacortes	67	20.4	89	60	1922	O
C.F.	203731	prop	psgr	1906	Tacoma	128	39.0	195	123	1922	O
Callendar	127409	prop	psgr	1900	Portland	74	22.6	84	57	1922	O
Champion	206918	prop	tug	1909	Hoquiam	89	27.1	98	65	1922	O
Columbia (1894)	127320	prop	frt.	1909	Fairhaven	29	8.8	9.0	5.0	1922	O
Comanche	211319	prop	frt.	1913	Seattle	134	40.8	547	350	1922	O
Champion	206918	prop	tug	1909	Hoquiam	89	27.1	98	65	1922	O
Dove	145547	prop	psgr	1889	Portland	75	22.9	47	32	1922	O
Earle	221428	prop	psgr	1902	Portland	39	11.9	8.0	5.0	1922	O
Echo (1900)	136791	prop	psgr	1900	Tacoma	67	20.4	56	38	1922	O
Fram	203216	prop	tug	1906	Hoquiam	43	13.1	17	4	1922	O
Gem	85593	pddl		1878	Seattle			88	1883	B	
Gertrude	86423	prop	psgr	1898	New Whatcom	39	11.9	17	11	1922	O
Heather	221528	prop	frt.	1921	Hoquiam	31	9.4	10	7.0	1922	O
Hoquiam	96404	prop	tug	1898	Hoquiam	62	18.9	41	20	1922	O
Irene (1912)	210183	prop	tug	1912	Hoquiam	47	14.3	24	16	1922	O
Narine	206583	prop	fish	1909	Mt. Vernon	38	11.6	13	9.0	1922	O
Orlou	206844	prop	fish	1909	Decatur Is.	35	10.7	8.0	6.0	1922	O
Osprey	200052	prop	yacht	1903	Seattle	90	27.4	32	21	1922	O
R.P. Elmore	110856	prop	tug	1890	Astoria	67	20.4	85	58	1922	O
Ranger (1899)	111240	prop	tug	1899	Hoquiam	59	18.0	34	6	1922	O
Redondo	162330	prop	psgr	1904	Hoquiam	66	20.1	77	42	1922	O
Rodoma	213179	prop	tug	1915	Bellingham	63	19.2	50	24	1922	O
Ruby Marie	204738	prop	fish	1907	Everett	39	11.9	11	7.0	1922	O
Scout	214787	prop	tug	1896	Port Townsend	62	18.9	17	12	1922	O
Seamill	216741	prop	tug	1918	Seattle	48	14.6	18	12	1922	O
Sea Wolf	217097	prop	fish	1904	Bremerton	35	10.7	10	6.0	1922	O
Sis	208655	prop	tug	1911	Shelton, WA	32	9.8	10	7.0	1922	O
Tillicum (1901)	145915	prop	tug	1901	Ballard	87	26.5	115	85	1922	O
Tillicum (1911) (Note: Ex USN No. 691.)	222053	prop	tug	1911	Mare Is., CA	49	14.9	15	10	1922	O
Uwanta	208655	prop	fish	1901	Eliza Is.	69	21.0	63	32	1922	O
Venture	204609	prop	tug	1907	Friday Harbor	71	21.6	36	14	1922	O
W.H. Bancroft	208384	stern	misc	1911	Winslow	112	34.1	179	103	1922	O
Westport	209877	prop	fish	1912	Seattle	88	26.8	116	59	1922	O
Dashaway			scow	1861					1861	O	
Lizzie Hind				1866					1861	O	
Isabel			scow	1870		146	44.5			1870	O
Daniel Webster				1852		50	15.2	26		1852	O

== Ships built for service elsewhere ==
Steam vessels constructed on Puget Sound but used solely in other areas
Name	Registry	Type	Use	Year built	Where built	Length		Gross Tons	Regis Tons	End Year	Disposition
Name	Registry	Type	Use	Year built	Where built	ft	m	Gross Tons	Regis Tons	End Year	Disposition
Constantine		prop	ftr.	1898	Seattle	134	40.8			1898	T-AK
D.R. Campbell		stern	frt.	1898	Seattle	176	53.6			1898	T-AK
F.K. Gustin	121071	stern	frt.	1898	Seattle	176	53.6	718	409	1898	T-AK
J.P. Light		stern	frt.	1898	Seattle	176	53.6			1898	T-AK
Mary F. Graff		stern	frt.	1898	Seattle	176	53.6			1898	T-AK
Milwaukee (1898)	92865	prop	frt.	1898	Ballard	136	41.5	396		1898	T-AK
Monarch	stern		frt.	1898	Seattle	176	53.6			1898	T-AK
Oil City	155318	stern	psgr	1898	Seattle	176	53.6	719	409	1898	T-AK
Pilgrim	150778	stern	frt.	1898	Seattle	176	53.6	718	409	1898	T-AK
Puritan (1898)		stern	frt.	1898	Seattle	176	53.6			1898	T-AK
Quickstep (1898)	20617	stern	frt.	1898	Seattle	124	37.8	343	233	1898	T-AK
St. Michael	116816	stern	frt.	1898	Seattle	176	53.6	718	409	1898	T-AK
Schwatka		stern	psgr	1898	Port Blakely	146	44.5			1898	T-AK
Seattle (1898)		stern	frt.	1898	Seattle	176	53.6			1898	T-AK
Sovereign		stern	frt.	1898	Ballard	125	38.1			1898	T-AK
Tacoma (1898)	145773	stern	frt.	1898	Seattle	176	53.6	718	409	1898	T-AK
Victoria (1898)		stern	frt.	1898	Seattle	176	53.6			1898	T-AK
Western Star		stern	frt.	1898	Seattle	176	53.6			1898	T-AK

== Gasoline and naphtha launches ==
Gasoline and naphtha launches of Western Washington
Name	Registry	Use	Fuel	Year built	Where built	Length		Gross Tons	Regis Tons	IHP	Crew size	End	Disposition
Name	Registry	Use	Fuel	Year built	Where built	ft	m	Gross Tons	Regis Tons	IHP	Crew size	End	Disposition
Addie V.	204732	psgr	gasoline	1907	Aberdeen	27	8.2	7	5			1909	O
Addie V.	107388	psgr	gasoline	1898	Ballard	46	14.0	14	9			1909	O
Advance (1907)	204838	psgr	gasoline	1907	Hoquiam	39	11.9	14	10			1909	O
Advance (1908)	205756	psgr	gasoline	1908	Seattle	40	12.2	17	12			1909	O
Agnes M	205756	psgr	gasoline	1908	Seattle	33	10.1	8	5			1909	O
Bainbridge (gas launch)		psgr	gasoline	1908	Seattle	78	23.8						
Chickaree (gas launch)	203023	psgr	gasoline	1906	Tacoma	74	22.6					1942	B
Davy Jones	204748	yacht	gasoline	1907	Seattle	73	22.3					1923	A
Falcon		launch	gasoline	1908	Anacortes	67	20.4						A
Iris	100646		naphtha	1896	South Bend	45	13.7	59					
La Paloma	205974	tug	gasoline	1922	Tacoma	60	18.3						C-G
Lark	204753	misc	gasoline		Dockton	44	13.4	14	10				
Lavina	201805	misc	gasoline	1907									
Leota	205434	misc	gasoline	1908	Dockton	45	13.7	14	10			1950	O
Lotus	206231	tug	gasoline	1901	Tacoma	92	28.0	130	88			1903	T
Oriole (naphtha launch)	155260	psgr	naphtha	1894	New Whatcom	34	10.4	7.0	6.0			1901	O
Rhododendron	206103	yacht	gasoline	1909	Mount Vernon	45	13.7	17	11			1909	O
Virginia I (1908) (Note: Ex Virginia Merrill.)		psgr	gasoline	1908	Tacoma	54	16.5						
Transfer	145632	psgr	gasoline	1895	Aberdeen	42	12.8	14	14			1901	O
Uncle Jim	25325	psgr	gasoline	1900	Astoria	45	13.7	13	9.0			1901	O
Vaughn	204596	frt.	gasoline	1907	Tacoma	45	13.7	14	10			1909	O

== Ocean-going steam tugs ==
Ocean-going and large steam tugs
Name	Registry	Type	Use	Year built	Where built	Length		Gross Tons	Regis Tons	End	Disposition
Name	Registry	Type	Use	Year built	Where built	ft	m	Gross Tons	Regis Tons	End	Disposition
Rabboni	21642	prop	tug	1865	San Francisco	92	28.0	97	49		
Richard Holyoke	110335	prop	tug	1877	Seabeck	115	35.1	181	91	1935	D
Resolute (1887)	110747	prop	tug	1887	Mill No. 4, Oregon	104	31.7	97	44	1901	O
Roosevelt	202129	prop	tug	1905	Verona, ME	182	55.5	654	445	1936	D
S.L. Mastick		side	tug	1869	Port Discovery	130	39.6	195	107	1899	D
Sea King		prop	tug	1883	San Francisco	120	36.6			1940	A
Tacoma (1877)	145114	prop	tug	1877	San Francisco	136	41.5	239	128	1925	A
Tatoosh	145846	prop	tug	1900	Seattle	154	46.9	277	154	1901	O
Tyee (1884)		prop	tug	1884	Port Ludlow	141	43.0	316	158 (Note: An 1891 source gives 128.42 net tons.)		
Wallowa	81233	prop	tug	1889	Portland	112	34.1	184	92	1901	O
Wanderer	81275	prop	tug	1890	Port Blakely	128	39.0	212	125	1950	A
City of Columbia	126954	prop		1880	Seattle	44	13.4	25	13	1894	O
Cruiser	126368	prop		1886	North Bend, OR	70	21.3	63	33	1894	O
General Canby	85414	prop		1873	South Bend	85	25.9	89	44	1894	O
Quickstep (1875)	70751	prop		1875	San Francisco	62	18.9	22	12	1894	O
Restless	110844	prop		1889	Astoria	45	13.7	28	19	1894	O
Ruth F	111056	prop		1894	Anacortes	42	12.8	21	19	1894	O
Stimson	116518	prop		1892	Ballard	49	14.9	26	13	1894	O
Toiwo	145615	prop		1891	Deep River	34	10.4	12	6.0	1894	O
Alhambra	1230	pddl			Osyterville				5.0	1878	O
Capital	125486	pddl			Olympia				10	1878	O
Dispatch	6901	prop			Seattle				67	1878	O
Favorite (ca 1878)	120165	pddl			Olympia				74	1878	O
Ruby	21869	pddl			Port Madison			38	1878	O	
Teaser	145002	stern			Port Townsend				52	1878	O
Resolute	21550	pddl			Port Madison				76		X
