= Iola =

Iola or IOLA may refer to:

== Places in the United States ==
- Iola, Colorado, a ghost town
- Iola, Florida, an unincorporated community
- Iola, Illinois, a village
- Iola, Kansas, a city
- Iola, Pennsylvania, a census-designated place
- Iola, Texas, a city
- Iola, Wisconsin, a village
- Iola (town), Wisconsin, a town next to or partially within the village

== Given name ==
=== People ===
- Iola Evans (born 1994), English actress
- Iola Fuller (1906–1993), American writer
- Iola Gregory (1946–2017), Welsh actress
- Iola Abraham Ikkidluak (1936–2003), Inuk artist
- Iola Johnson (born 1950), American news anchor
- Iola, pen name of American writer Ida B. Wells

=== Fictional characters ===
- Iola Boylan, on the television series Mama's Family
- the title protagonist of Iola Leroy, a novel by Frances Harper
- Iola Morton, girlfriend of Joe Hardy in the Hardy Boys novels
- Iola, a mute temple servant in The Witcher story collection The Last Wish

== Other uses ==
- Iola (steamboat 1885), active on Puget Sound from 1885 to 1915
- Interest on Lawyer Trust Accounts, a method of raising money for charitable purposes in the United States
- Myrmarachne, a genus of jumping spiders
