= City of Shelton =

City of Shelton may refer to:

- Shelton, Connecticut
- Shelton, Washington
- City of Shelton (sternwheeler)
