= Triumph (sternwheeler) =

American steamboat

- ]] (above)Triumph (small steamer in center) at Bellingham. (below) Triumph on the Nooksack River near Lynden, 1889.

History
- Name: Triumph
- Completed: 1889 or 1892
- Fate: Destroyed by fire 1897

General characteristics
- Type: inland steamboat
- Tonnage: 66.97 regist.
- Installed power: twin steam engines, horizontally mounted.
- Propulsion: sternwheeler

Triumph was a sternwheel steamboat that ran on the Nooksack River in Whatcom County, Washington in the 1890s.

== Career ==
Triumph is reported to have been built by Capt. Simon P. Randolph (d.1909 at Seattle), either 1889 at Lynden, WA or in 1892 at Whatcom. Randolph, who received his master's license in 1871, had been the first man to operate a steamboat on Lake Washington, had commanded or owned a number of smaller sternwheelers over his career including Fannie, Old Settler, Comet, and the Edith R. His son, Capt. Preston Brooks Randolph (1860–1939), was also involved in ownership and management of the later boats, including Triumph.

Triumph was served on the Nooksack River, which the Randolphs had developed as a steamboat route. In 1897, Triumph was destroyed by fire near the town of Marietta, WA, in Whatcom County.
