= C. C. Cherry =

Steam tug built in 1896

History
- Name: C.C. Cherry
- Route: Puget Sound
- Completed: 1896
- Out of service: 1930
- Identification: US registry #127139
- Fate: Abandoned

General characteristics
- Type: inland steam towboat
- Tonnage: 54 gross; 37 registered
- Length: 68.7 ft (20.94 m)
- Beam: 16.4 ft (5.00 m)
- Depth: 7.0 ft (2.1 m) depth of hold.
- Installed power: steam engine
- Propulsion: propeller
- Crew: six (6)

C.C. Cherry was a small steam tug and general utility vessel that worked on Puget Sound from 1896 to 1930.

== Career ==
CC Cherry was built in 1896 for Capt. E.A. Smith. The first use of the vessel was hauling fish from the San Juan Islands to a Canadian cannery One of the early masters of C.C. Cherry was the prominent steamboat man William Williamson (1859-1930), who later commanded the well-known steamship Flyer from 1896 to 1904.

== Explosion of the Virginia ==
C.C. Cherry was working as a tug in July 1928, when the small gasoline-powered tug Virginia exploded at the entrance to the Lake Washington Ship Canal. The engineer was killed, and the captain was blown through the roof of the pilot house and into the water. He was then rescued by the crew of C.C. Cherry.

C.C. Cherry is reported to have been abandoned in 1930.
