= Tacoma (steamship) =

Steamship that served from 1913 to 1938

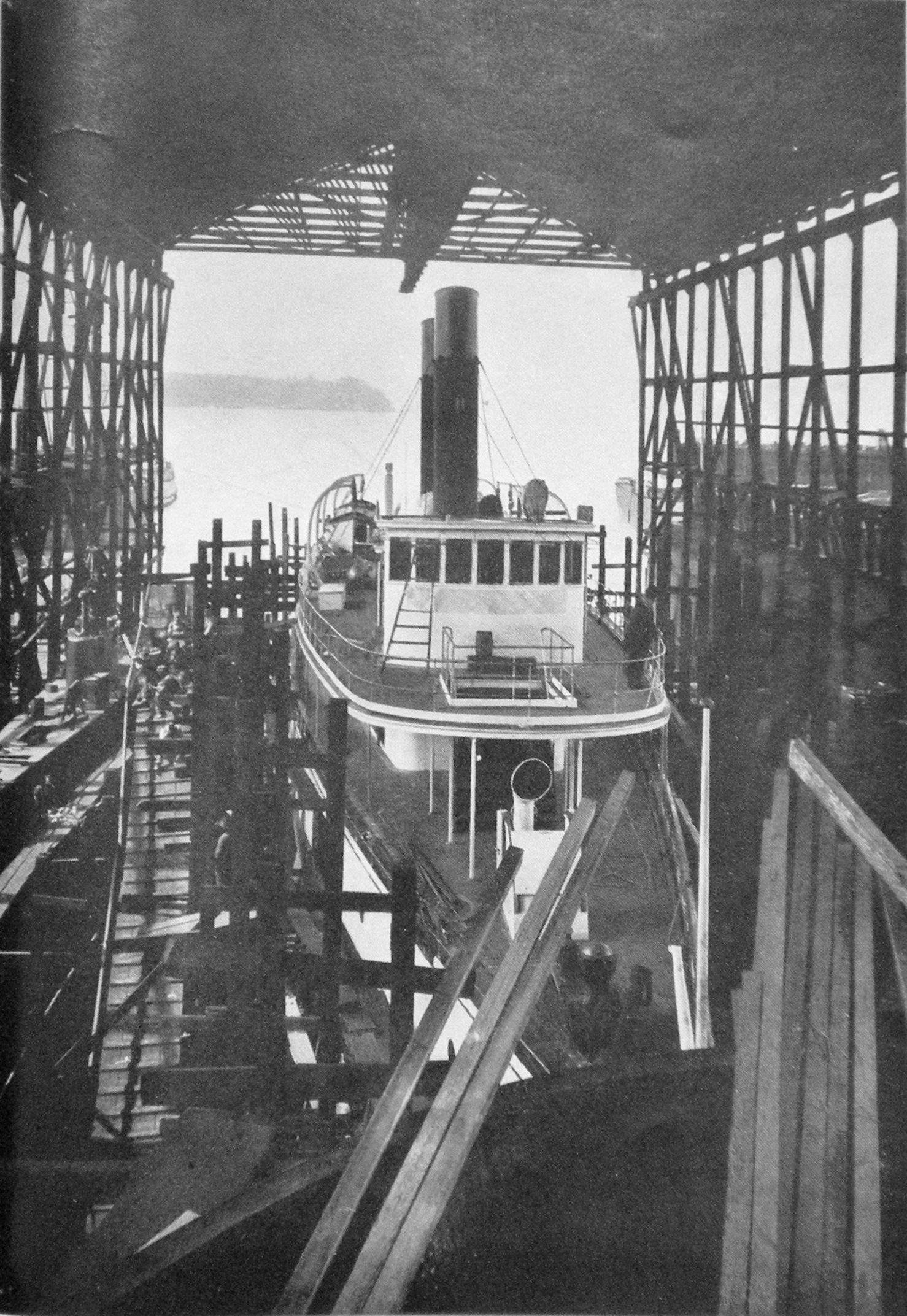
- Tacoma

History
- Name: Tacoma
- Owner: Puget Sound Navigation Company
- Route: Puget Sound. Strait of Juan de Fuca (Seattle-Tacoma, Seattle-Victoria, excursions)
- Ordered: 1 August 1912
- Builder: Seattle Construction and Drydock Company
- Christened: 3 May 1913
- Maiden voyage: 24 June 1913
- In service: 1913
- Out of service: 1938
- Fate: Scrapped

General characteristics
- Type: inland steamship (express passenger)
- Tonnage: 836
- Length: 209 ft (64 m)
- Beam: 30 ft (9 m)
- Depth: 17.6 ft (5 m) depth of hold
- Installed power: steam engine, compound, four cylinders, twin oil-fueled boilers generating 250/lb. steam.
- Propulsion: single propeller
- Speed: Designed for regular speed of 19.0 knots; capable of 21.5 knots maximum speed.

Tacoma was a steamship that served from 1913 to 1938 on Puget Sound. Built of steel, Tacoma was known for being one of the fastest and best-designed vessels to operate on Puget Sound. Tacoma was particularly noted for high-speed service from 1913 to 1930 on the route between Tacoma and Seattle.

== Design and construction ==
On 12 August 1912, the Puget Sound Navigation Company ("PSN'") contracted with the Seattle Construction and Drydock Company to build for them a passenger vessel which would run at a regular speed of 19 knots and which would be ready for service by 1 March 1913. PSN had decided to replace its fleet of wooden steamers with steel-built replacements, and Tacoma was intended to be the first of a new series of high-speed vessels. Tacoma was designed by James V. Paterson, the president of Seattle Construction and Drydock.

Tacoma was launched on 3 May 1913. The vessel was christened by Florence Lister, daughter of the governor of Oregon. Various dignitaries were brought to the launching in another PSN vessel, the steel steamship Indianapolis, with PSN President Joshua Green on board. Acceptance trials were conducted on 16 June 1913, and the vessel was found capable of 20.78 knots. Later the vessel was found to be capable of running even faster, at 21.5 knots.

=== Propulsion ===
Tacoma was driven by a single propeller, driven by a steam engine about 35 feet long. The engine was a four-cylinder, triple-expansion type, which was designed to extract the maximum energy possible from the steam. Twin oil-fired Ballin water-tube boilers supplied steam at 250 pounds pressure.

== Operations on Puget Sound ==
On 24 June 1913 Tacoma made its first regular run from Seattle to Tacoma in 77 minutes. This was a new speed record for the route. With the aid of a tug, Tacoma could be turned at the Tacoma municipal dock in 2.5 minutes, half the time it took to turn Indianapolis, then the other major vessel on the route. About six months after Tacoma began on the route, command of the vessel was taken over by Capt. Everett B. Coffin, one of the most experienced steamboat captains of Puget Sound. He had commanded the famous Flyer for much of the time from 1890 to 1911 when Flyer had dominated the Seattle-Tacoma route in competition with the Puget Sound Navigation Company.

Tacoma was a well-designed vessel which handled extremely well. Captain Coffin, in later years after Tacoma had been taken out of service, described the vessel in comparison to Flyer.

Previous to becoming master of S.S. Tacoma in 1914, I had been mate and master of S.S. Flyer for twelve years and I was a little doubtful if Tacoma could equal the workings of Flyer. But I soon found out that Tacoma was superior in every point. She was faster and much easier to handle, and as for time, she could be depended on to a second. Day in and day out, her time between points, allowing for tidal conditions, was the same, and in making landings at the different piers, it was like landing in a row boat. Her reversing power was wonderful and from full ahead to dead stop required seventeen seconds, a feat that was tried several times. Going astern, she was almost as fast as ahead, when she would gain in speed. Another point she had, when emergency required a sudden reversal, by a slight change in the rudder she could be held in perfect position until she commenced to gain sternway. Then she would crawl rapidly to port. Her ability on the points mentioned often prevented accidents in fog.

== End of regular service ==
Tacoma continued in service until better roads and increased automobile and bus traffic between Seattle and Tacoma forced the termination of regular marine passenger between the two cities. Tacoma's last run on December 15, 1930 marked the real end of commercial passenger activity for steamboats on Puget Sound. Marine historians Newell and Williamson documented the occasion:

The Tacoma and the Indianapolis passed a little south of Three Tree Point. ... Capt. Coffin pulled down a window and leaned out in the driving rain. The Indianapolis floated by, a dozen squares of light topped by a star. She spoke; three long, lingering blasts. ... Capt. Coffin reached for his own whistle cord. Three long blasts. And he let the last blast die away slowly, until it was only a moan in the throat of the whistle. “That’s the last time we pass each other,” he said.

When Tacoma arrived at the dock in Tacoma harbor that last night, every ship in the port blew three blasts on their whistles as a salute. Andrew Foss, owner of the great Foss tug concern, sent Foss No. 17 to help Tacoma make the landing, even though it had been two years since Tacoma could afford a tug. Departing that last time on her return to Seattle, Tacoma passed the hull of the Greyhound, once the fastest boat on the Sound and now, minus her upper works, engines and sternwheel, in service as a mudscow.

== Last years ==
Tacoma was still a sound vessel, and from time to time was placed on excursion runs or on the Seattle to Victoria. When the Puget Sound Navigation Company brought the streamlined ferry Kalakala on to the Seattle-Bremerton route, the mechanical problems of Kalakala required that Tacoma escort the ferry on the first run west across the Sound to Bremerton. During the westbound trip, to avoid embarrassing the owners, who had billed Kalakala as the fast ferry on the sound, Tacoma was restricted to running at Kalakala's maximum speed, about 17 knots. On the return, however, made by Tacoma alone without Kalakala, Captain Coffin ran Tacoma at top speed, which set a speed record for the trip. Captain Coffin recalled the Tacoma's later years:

When she was put in the excursion business, I got a great surprise as to her sea going abilities in the Strait between Point Wilson and Victoria. In the fresh southwesters that often occur in summer afternoons, I found her able to meet them all with very little fuss in going or coming either way. So I have always said that she was the ablest boat of her size ever on the Sound and as for stability, she was a wonder. When tested at inspection, as was often done, she surprised those giving the test. I have often see five and six hundred passengers on the hurricane deck when landing and very few in the cabin, and she would hold her stability.

== Sold for scrap ==
In October 1938, Puget Sound Navigation company sold Tacoma, and a number of other vessels, to Seattle Iron and Metals Corporation, for scrapping.
