= Mizpah (steamboat) =

1905 steamboat in United States

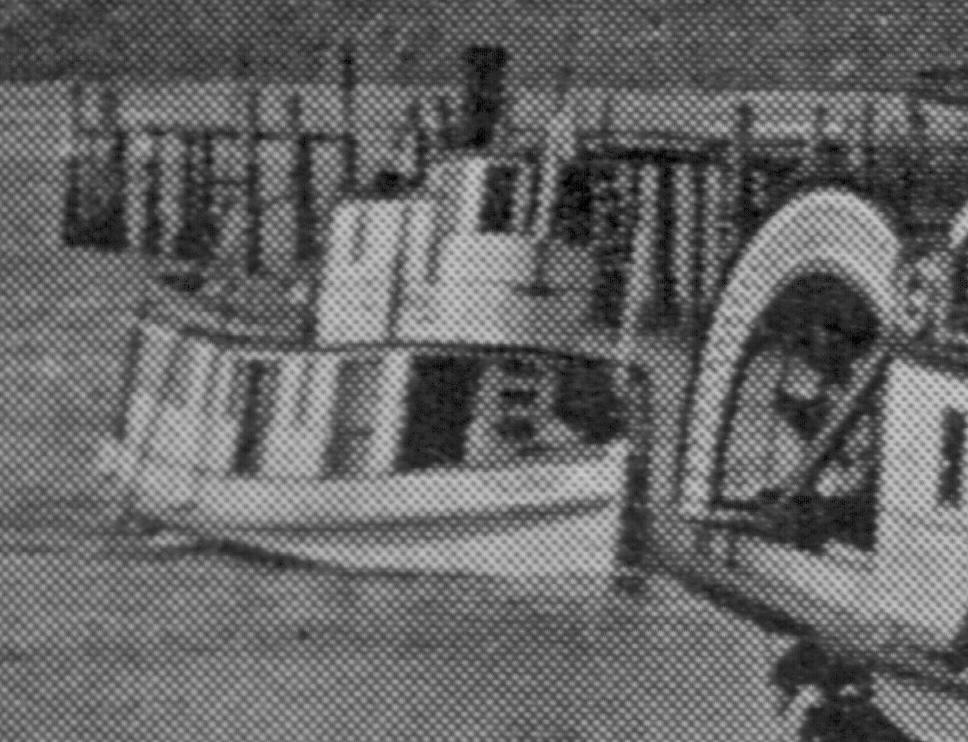
- Mizpah approaching dock in Olympia, circa 1911, with sternwheel of S.G. Simpson visible on right

History

United States
- Name: Mizpah
- Builder: Olympia, Washington
- Laid down: 1901
- Launched: 1905
- In service: 1905
- Out of service: possibly 1960
- Refit: Rebuilt after fire, 1915
- Fate: Unknown

General characteristics
- Tonnage: 12 tons
- Length: 55 ft (17 m)
- Decks: 2
- Propulsion: Gasoline engine; 60 hp (45 kW) Fairbanks-Morse diesel engine from 1921; 1 shaft

The steamboat Mizpah operated in the early 1900s as part of the Puget Sound Mosquito Fleet.

== Construction ==
Construction of Mizpah began in 1901 at Olympia, but the vessel was not launched until 1905, when she was completed by Capt. John C. Ross. Mizpah was propeller-driven, 55 feet (17 m) long, and rated at only 12 tons. Even so, she had two decks, the lower for freight and the upper for passengers and the pilot house. Her first skipper was Capt. Volney C.F. Young, with Capt. Ross acting as engineer.

== Operation ==
Mizpah served points on upper Puget Sound running from Olympia to Hunter's Point, Rolling Bay, Oyster Bay, and Kamilche. Gordon Newell described Mizpah ’s role in the early maritime transportation network:

[A]s a steamboat, she was typical of the small craft that carried the mail and groceries, milk cans and mail order catalogs to the settlements that only saw the big steamers as flashes of white speeding towards the cities.

Captain Ross fell overboard from Mizpah in September 1906 and was drowned. He had left the engine room to catch some air after the boat had gone around Windy Point. The fireman noticed him missing a few minutes later and alerted Captain Young, who turned the boat about and tried to find Captain Ross, but could not. His body turned up a week later. Captain Ross left a wife and two children. His widow later married Captain Young.At some point, Mizpah seems to have come into the ownership of Captain Hopkins of Olympia, who in 1911 replaced her on the Oyster Bay and Kamilche run with the gasoline-powered passenger and freight boat Chickaree, which he had bought from Capt. F.G. Reeve.

== Fire and reconstruction ==
In 1915, Mizpah burned to the waterline. Enough was left of her hull to allow her to be rebuilt as a tug. In 1920, minus her passenger cabin and pilot house, she was being operated by Captain Young with the tug Prospector as part of his Capital City Tug Company. In about 1921, she was converted from a gasoline power plant to 60 horsepower (45 kW) Fairbanks-Morse diesel propulsion.

== Disposition ==
Mizpah was still in operation in 1951, and possibly as late as 1960, working as a tug and tow boat on upper Puget Sound.
