= Iola (1885 steamboat) =

1885 steamboat in United States

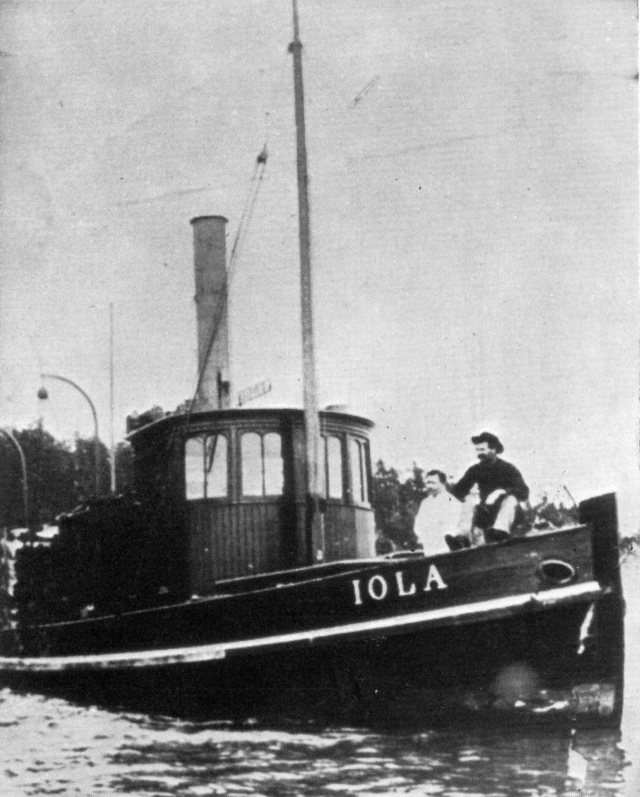
- Iola

History
- Name: Iola
- Route: Puget Sound
- Completed: 1885, Hammersley Inlet
- Out of service: 1915
- Fate: Abandoned

General characteristics
- Length: 64 ft (19.5 m)
- Installed power: steam engine
- Propulsion: propeller

Iola was a small steam vessel that operated on Puget Sound from 1885 to 1915.

== Career ==
Iola was built at Hammersley Inlet, then known as "Big Skookum", in the extreme southern portion of Puget Sound. The vessel entered service in June 1885 under the command of her first owner, Capt. Edwin Miller. The vessel initially made weekly runs from Oakland, Washington (in northern Puget Sound) to Olympia and Seattle, but within six months trip frequency had increase to twice a week. In June 1887, Miller hired John F. Vanderhoef to act as the vessel's master and agent. He rebuilt the cabins to accommodate both his wife and himself on a full-time basis. By 1889 Vanderhoef had ceased service in north Puget Sound and was concentrating on Vashon Island landings.

== Overboard incident ==
A story is reported that as Iola was moving towards Seattle on the west side of Vashon Island, with Captain Vanderhoef in the pilot house. While shaking a tablecloth over the side, Mrs. Vanderhoef fell overboard. Her husband did not hear her call for help, because of the engine noise. He did not notice she was missing until he reached Seattle. He turned the vessel around to begin looking for her. He is reported to have said "I thought for sure the Devil had her." Mrs. Vanderhoef was kept afloat for a while by air trapped within her voluminous skirts. A man on the shore, Thomas Redding, heard Mrs. Vanderhoef call for help, and took out a boat and rescued her. Two years later Redding bought the Iola.
