= City of Mukilteo (steam ferry) =

1927 steamboat in United States

History
- Name: City of Mukilteo
- Owner: Puget Sound Navigation Co.
- Builder: Marine Construction Co.
- In service: 1927
- Out of service: April 1932
- Fate: Destroyed by fire

General characteristics
- Type: steam ferry
- Length: 104 ft (31.70 m)
- Beam: 35 ft (10.67 m)
- Installed power: steam engine
- Propulsion: propeller

City of Mukilteo was a steam ferry built in 1927 which served on Puget Sound until April 1932, when the ferry was destroyed by fire.

== Career ==
City of Mukilteo was built in 1927 by the Marine Construction Co. of Seattle for the Puget Sound Navigation Company (PSN). PSN placed the ferry on routes out of Mukilteo, with stops on Whidbey Island. In 1929 the City of Mukilteo was one of 19 automobile ferries owned by PSN, of a total fleet of 29 vessels. In April 1932 the ferry was destroyed by fire.
