= Iola Fuller =

American writer (1906–1993)

Iola Fuller (Marcellus, Michigan, January 25, 1906 – April 12, 1993), later Iola Fuller Goodspeed McCoy, was an American writer.

Her first novel, The Loon Feather, won the 1939 Hopwood Award from the University of Michigan. Set primarily on Mackinac Island in the early 1800s, it is a tale of the life of the daughter of American Indian leader Tecumseh. During World War II, 150,000 copies of the book were printed as Armed Services Editions, inexpensive paperbacks which the Army and Navy Library Services distributed free of charge to members of the American armed forces.

== Personal ==
On June 28, 1927 in Marcellus, Michigan, she married Edwin W. Goodspeed. They divorced in 1947. On July 5, 1947, she married Raymond Arthur McCoy. She died on April 12, 1993, in Littleton, Colorado.

== Selected works ==
- The Loon Feather (1940)
- The Shining Trail (1943)
- The Gilded Torch (1957)
- All the Golden Gifts (1966)
