= Iola Abraham Ikkidluak =

Inuk artist (1936-2003)

- Born: 1936
- Died: 2003 (aged 66–67)

Iola Abraham Ikkidluak (1936–2003) was an Inuk sculptor from Kimmirut, Nunavut.

He participated in the Smithsonian Institution's 1979-1981 touring exhibition By the Light of the Qulliq. His work is included in the permanent collections of the National Gallery of Canada, the McMichael Canadian Art Collection, the Toronto-Dominion Bank Collection, the Winnipeg Art Gallery, the Musée national des beaux-arts du Québec, the National Museum of Finland, and the University of Michigan Museum of Art.

Ikkidluak's work frequently depicted Arctic animals, including polar bears, walruses, seals, whales, and birds.

He worked in soapstone, bone, antlers, and green serpentine.

His disc number was E7-923.

His wife Namonai (born 1944) was also an artist. Their son Tutuyea was also a carver.
