= SS Daring =

SS Daring was the name of several steamships, including:

- SS Daring (1909), a Puget Sound steamboat
- SS Daring (1943), a Liberian steamship
