= Oakland, Washington =

Unincorporated community in Washington, United States

- Unincorporated community
- Location within Washington (state) Location within the United States
- Coordinates: 47°13′37″N 123°03′59″W
- Country: United States
- State: Washington
- County: Mason
- Elevation: 0 ft (0 m)
- Time zone: UTC-8 (Pacific (PST))
  - Summer (DST): UTC-7 (PDT)
- GNIS feature ID: 1523959

Oakland is an unincorporated community in Mason County, in the U.S. state of Washington.

== History ==
A post office called Oakland was established in 1858, and remained in operation until 1889. The community was named for a grove of oak trees near the original town site.
