= Falcon (gasoline launch) =

Gasoline-powered boat, built 1909

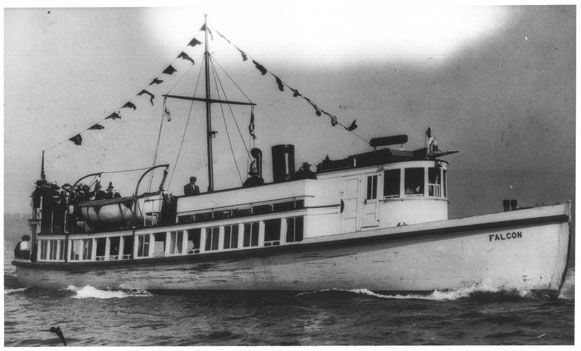
- Falcon

History
- Name: Falcon
- Owner: Island Transportation Co., Kitsap County Transportation Co., Alki Point Transportation Co.
- Port of registry: Port Townsend, Washington
- Route: San Juan Islands, Puget Sound, Bellingham-Anacortes and Lake Washington
- Cost: $8,000
- In service: 1908 or 1909
- Out of service: Unknown but apparently after June 30, 1919
- Identification: U.S. Registry #204927
- Fate: Possibly deliberately sunk.
- Notes: Wreck discovered in good condition in 2006 in Lake Washington.

General characteristics
- Type: inland launch
- Tonnage: 46 gross; 26 registered tons
- Length: 85 ft (25.91 m) or 67.9 ft (20.70 m)
- Beam: 16 ft (4.88 m) or 14.8 ft (4.51 m)
- Depth of hold: 4.8 ft (1.46 m)
- Installed power: 100 hp Eastern Standard gasoline engine
- Propulsion: propeller
- Crew: 2

Falcon was a 26 registered ton gasoline-powered launch built in Bellingham, Washington in 1909. She operated in Puget Sound and nearby regions, and also on Lake Washington during the first part of the 1900s. The wreck of this vessel has been discovered in Lake Washington not far from Kirkland and is in good condition under 190 feet (58 m) of water. This vessel should not be confused with the steam (later diesel) tug Falcon built in Tacoma, Washington in 1902.

== Construction and design ==
Falcon is reported to have been built in Bellingham, Washington in 1909 for the Island Transportation Company. There is some conflict in the sources. Another more contemporaneous source shows a gasoline-powered vessel named Falcon (U.S. Registry No. 204927) with the same sized engine (100 horsepower) as having been built in 1908 at Anacortes, Washington.

Falcon was one of a number of gasoline-engined launches built in 1909. Falcon was designed by L. H. Coolidge, a Seattle naval architect. Depending on the source, Falcon was either 85 ft (25.91 m) or 67.9 ft (20.70 m) long and either 16 ft (4.88 m) or 14.8 ft (4.51 m) on the beam, with a depth of hold of 4.8 ft (1.46 m). The overall size of the vessel was 46 gross and 26 registered tons. The total number of crew was two. Power was furnished by a 100 horsepower Eastern Standard engine. The cost of construction and equipment for the vessel was $8,000.

Subsequent to construction, and prior to January 1, 1917, $3,294.83 was expended on permanent improvements to the Falcon. As of June 30, 1911, the homeport was listed as Port Townsend, Washington. As of January 1, 1917, the market value of the Falcon was assessed at $10,500.

== Operation ==
Falcon was originally placed on the run between Bellingham and Anacortes, Washington by the Island Transportation Company. From 1913 to 1919, Falcon has been reported to have been owned by the Kitsap County Transportation Company.

However, according to a contemporaneous source, as of January 1, 1917, a gasoline-powered boat named Falcon was owned by the Alki Point Transportation Company, and was listed as the sole vessel owned by that company, which was engaged, from May through September, in gas boat service between Seattle, Washington, and the following points: South Alki Point, Three Tree Point, Des Moines, Zenith, Woodmont, and Redondo. In the early 1900s, the Alki Point Transportation Company had been engaged in equipping and operating a resort at Alki Point, now in West Seattle, Washington, which included a natatorium.

By 1917, Falcon was facing competition from a municipal street car line constructed by the city of Seattle as well as a new brick-paved highway built by King County, Washington along and parallel to the coast of Puget Sound, so much so that in March 1918, the future of Alki Point Transportation Co. appeared "precarious".

Island Transportation Company is reported to have held a 75% ownership interest in Falcon as of January 1, 1917.

== Disposition ==
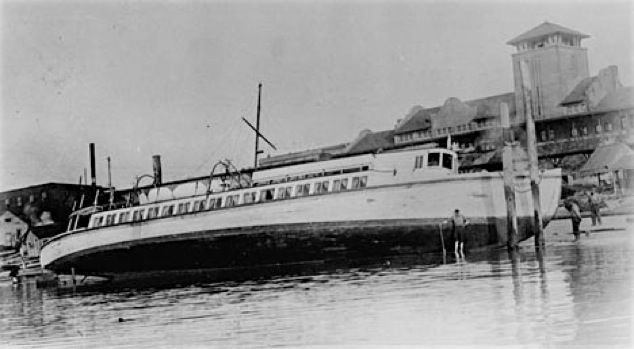
Falcon beached at Everett, Washington, unknown date.

Falcon was listed on the Annual List of Merchant Vessels for the year ending June 30, 1919 with a home port of Seattle, Washington. Although no source reports when the vessel left service, Falcon does not appear to be listed in any subsequent registries.

== Discovery of wreck ==
The wreck of Falcon has been discovered, lying at the bottom of Lake Washington, off of Kirkland, Washington, in water 190 ft (58 m) deep. It is not known how the Falcon came to be in Lake Washington. It has been speculated that the small-sized vessel could still earn a profit in operations on the lake when routes elsewhere became uneconomical. The wreck sits upright on the bottom and is in generally good condition. It is thought to have been possibly sunk deliberately when operations on the lake became unprofitable. The passenger cabin is intact, although the wheelhouse is missing. The exploratory team for the wreck speculated that the wheelhouse might have floated off when the vessel sank. The good condition of the wreck makes it an important history guide to the construction of vessels during the period when it was built.

== See also ==
- Steamboats of Lake Washington
- Puget Sound Mosquito Fleet
