= Fleetwood (steamboat) =

19th Century Steamboat

- steamboat Fleetwood, circa 1890, probably somewhere on Puget Sound

History
- Name: Fleetwood
- Owner: U.B. Scott; Z.J. Hatch
- Route: Columbia River, Puget Sound (Olympia - Tacoma - Seattle)
- Completed: 1881, at Portland, Oregon
- Fate: Sunk, Abandoned on beach at Quartermaster Harbor, circa 1898

General characteristics
- Type: Express passenger
- Tonnage: 135-tons
- Length: 111 ft (34 m)
- Beam: 32 ft (10 m)
- Installed power: steam
- Propulsion: propeller-drive

The steamboat Fleetwood operated in the 1880s and 1890s on the Columbia River and later as part of the Puget Sound Mosquito Fleet.

== Construction ==
Fleetwood was built in 1881, at Portland, Oregon, for Captain U.B. Scott and his associates L.B. Seeley and E.W. Creighton. Fleetwood was propeller-driven, 111' long, and rated at 135 tons.

== Operations on Columbia River ==
Capt. Scott successfully ran Fleetwood on the Astoria and Cascade routes on the Columbia River, in opposition to the would-be monopoly of the Oregon Railway and Navigation Company, then under the control of Henry Villard. Fleetwood outran the monopoly's steamers by two hours on the Astoria run, and built up so much business that Captain Scott had to replace her with the crack sternwheeler Telephone. Captain Scott trimmed up Fleetwood ‘s appearance a bit, not entirely to the liking of historian Newell:

The resulting striped paneling along her house, ginger-bread work on her cabin roof, and high-pointed pilot house roof crowned with a gilt ball, all gave the sturdy little Fleetwood an unfortunate resemblance to a forest cottage in a Grimm’s fairy tale book.

Other masters of Fleetwood on the Columbia River included Capt. William H. Whitcomb, a member of a prominent Northwest marine family, and, on Puget Sound, Capt. Henry Carter.

== Transfer to Puget Sound ==
In 1888, Capt. U.B. Scott sold Fleetwood to Capt. Z.J. Hatch, who transferred the vessel to Puget Sound. Fleetwood was brought around to Puget Sound by Captain Messegee for her new owner Capt. Hatch. On the way up, Captain Scott’s fancy trim work on the deckhouse caught fire, but the crew was able to extinguish it and Fleetwood rounded Cape Flattery and reached Neah Bay just 24 hours after leaving the Columbia Bar. Once on Puget Sound Fleetwood ran against another boat transferred up from the Columbia River, Emma Haywood. Fleetwood was advertised as a "fast time" steamer, leaving Horr's Wharf at Olympia at 6:00 a.m., stopping at Puget City, Steilacoom, and the Northern Pacific Railway wharf at Tacoma, and reaching Seattle's Yesler wharf at noon, then returning on the same route, arriving back in Olympia at 7:00 p.m.

In 1889, Fleetwood made record time on a trip from Olympia to Seattle to carry a steam fire engine to the aid of that city during its great fire. When Captain Scott expanded operations up to Puget Sound, he bought back Fleetwood and put her on the Seattle-Tacoma run with the new and eventually much more famous propeller steamer Flyer. On September 7, 1890, Fleetwood engaged unsuccessfully in an impromptu race between Tacoma and Seattle with the then brand-new and very fast sternwheeler Greyhound.

== Abandonment ==
In 1898 Fleetwood was abandoned on the beach in Quartermaster Harbor where for many years she was visible as she slowly rotted away.
