= Comet (sternwheeler) =

1871 steamboat in United States

History
- Name: Comet
- Route: Puget Sound, White, Black, and Nooksack rivers
- Completed: 1871
- Out of service: 1900 or early 1880s.
- Identification: US registry #5973
- Fate: Abandoned

General characteristics
- Type: inland steamboat
- Tonnage: 56.83 regist.
- Length: 65 ft (19.81 m)
- Installed power: two steam engines, horizontally mounted
- Propulsion: sternwheel

Comet was a sternwheel steamboat that ran from 1871 to 1900 on Puget Sound and rivers flowing into it, including the White and Nooksack rivers.

== Construction ==
The steamboat Comet, whose name was said to have been "misleading", was built in Seattle in 1871 by Capt. Simon F. Randolph (d.1909). Comet was constructed in an unusual fashion. Randolph built the vessel upside down by picking a flat area of ground, marking out the shape of the boat on the ground, and driving in posts at regular intervals to act as ribs. He then connected the ribs with crossbeams, bent planks around the posts and over the crossbeams, and had the hull complete, although upside down.

With the posts still affixed in the ground, the vessel looked like a potlatch house. Randolph then sawed off the posts, and pushed the hull out into the water. He then flipped the hull over using rocks piled on one side as an assist. The resulting hull was right-side up, but full of water. Randolph then beached the hull, pumped out the water with a home-made wooden pump, and the hull was complete. The steam engines Randolph installed were described as "non-descript and mismatching" and the upper works were said to have been tall and barn-like.

== Career ==
Comet was placed on the White River route under Capt. Curtis D. Brownfield (b. 1850) until 1876 or later, and was the first steamer to be successful on that route, which included service to farmlands on the Black River. Comet then was shifted to run almost every route out of Seattle. Under Captain Brownfield, Comet was a pioneer vessel on the Nooksack River. Capt. George A. Cushman (d.1891), who built the steamer Lillie, also for the White River route, was in command of Comet for a long time. (The current course of the White River deviates from its original as a result of flood control projects).

Capt J. C. Brittain (d.1891), who at one point controlled one of the largest merchant fleets on Puget Sound, came to own Comet at some point and used the vessel in connection with the steamers Despatch and Teaser to carry the mail, for which he had a contract, to Snohomish, La Conner, Whidbey Island, Fidalgo, Bellingham Bay, Semiahmoo Bay, and Lopez, Orcas and San Juan islands.
