= Flyer (steamboat) =

1891 steamboat in United States

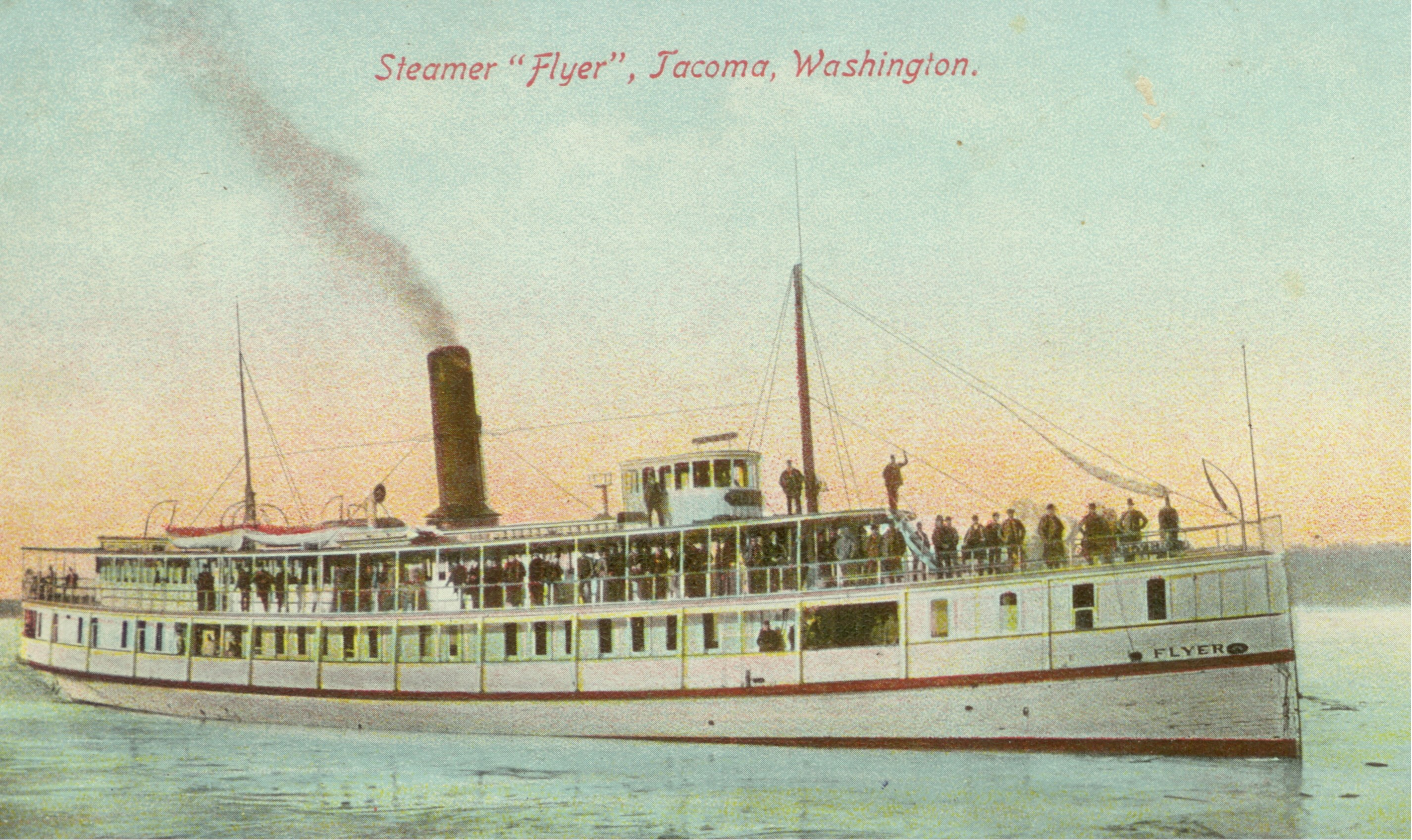
- Flyer

History
- Name: Flyer
- Operator: Columbia River and Puget Sound Navigation Company
- Route: Puget Sound (Seattle-Tacoma, Seattle-Everett) USA
- Builder: Johnson shipyard, Portland Oregon
- In service: 1891
- Out of service: 1929
- Fate: burned for metal

General characteristics
- Type: inland steamship (express passenger)
- Length: 170 ft (52 m)
- Beam: 21 ft (6 m)
- Depth: 15.0 ft (5 m) depth of hold
- Installed power: steam engine, compound
- Propulsion: single propeller
- Speed: 18.5 miles/hr (sustained average speed over an entire route; maximum speed higher)
- Notes: Converted to oil fuel in 1906

Flyer was an American steamboat that served from 1891 to 1929 on Puget Sound. From 1918 until the end of her service, she was officially known as the Washington. The Flyer ran for millions of miles at high speed, more than any inland vessel in the world. This 1891 steamer Flyer should not be confused with the steamboat Flyer built on Lake Coeur d'Alene in 1905, although the Coeur d'Alene vessel was inspired both in design and name by the success of the Puget Sound ship.

== Design and construction ==
Flyer was the first vessel ordered by the Columbia River and Puget Sound Navigation Company, a concern formed by Capt. U.B. Scott and others, which already controlled the fast sternwheeler Telephone on the Columbia River, and on Puget Sound, the then new and fast sternwheeler Bailey Gatzert as well as the express passenger boat Fleetwood. Flyer was built at the Johnson shipyard in Portland, Oregon of Douglas fir cut in Oregon and prepared for construction by prolonged storage in salt water. Unusually for an express passenger boat, Flyer included a dining room, which contributed to her great popularity.

=== Failed launching ===
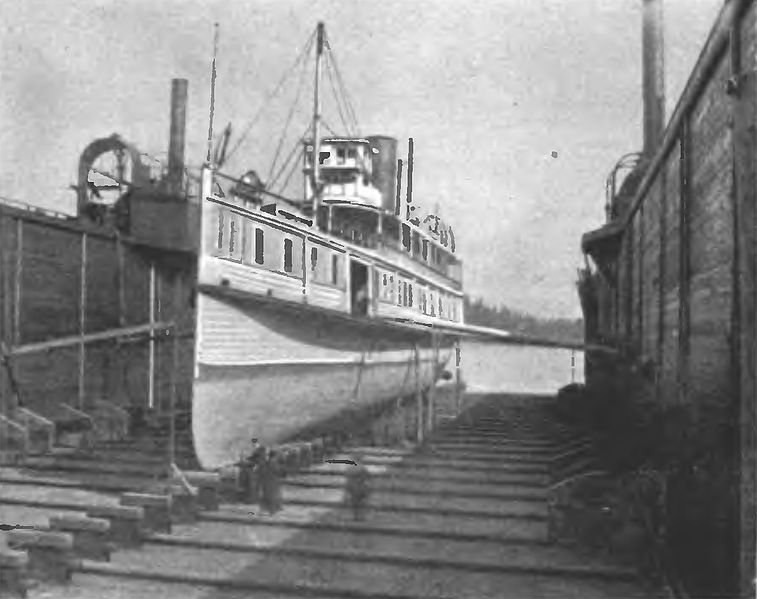
Flyer in floating drydock at Quartermaster Harbor, on Maury Island, sometime before 1895

Flyer was designed to be the fastest propeller-driven vessel in the Pacific Northwest, and was very fine-lined, that is, tall and narrow. Captain Scott was so proud of his new ship that he rode on her as she was launched into the Willamette River. This proved to be a mistake. Neither boilers nor engines had been installed in Flyer before launch, and without their weight deep in her hull to act as ballast, she simply flopped over in the water, and Captain Scott had to exit by climbing out a window. After that, another hull was built around her with the hope of making her a little less top–heavy, but this was imperfectly sealed, so water sloshed around in between the hulls for the rest of the vessel's operational life. Surprisingly, this did not affect the Flyer's speed, although she did acquire a permanent list to port, or at least the hint of a list. Once finally completed, the company sent Flyer to Puget Sound and brought Bailey Gatzert around to the Columbia River to run with the Telephone.

=== Propulsion ===
An animation of a simplified triple-expansion engine, like the one that drove the Flyer. High-pressure steam (red) enters from the boiler and passes through the engine, exhausting as low-pressure steam (blue) to the condenser.

Flyer was powered by a triple compound steam engine built by the Philadelphia firm of Neafie and Levy. It was a duplicate of one installed in J.P. Morgan's yacht Corsair. The bore sizes for the three cylinders, from high pressure to low pressure, were 21¼ʺ, 33½ʺ, and 54½ʺ, all with 30ʺ stroke. The engine drew national attention when it was built. It rose above the passenger deck, and passengers looked forward to watching the huge low-pressure cylinder, almost five feet across, drive the vessel at high speed.

The original steel boiler, built by Willamette Iron and Steel Works, of Portland, Oregon, generated steam at 160 pounds/inch² pressure. It was 8.0 ft (2 m) long and 29.0 ft (9 m). The boiler was replaced in 1899 with a two-furnace locomotive boiler constructed by Freeman & Sons of Racine, Wisconsin.

Flyer was originally a wood burner, consuming 24 cords of wood during every day of operation. Her firebox could hold two cords of wood. In 1906, she was converted to oil fuel, and was considered to be fuel-efficient, burning an average of 61 barrels (9.7 m^{3}) of oil on a daily basis. Although her engine was capable of generating 2,000 horsepower (1,500 kW) at 200 pounds steam pressure, at no time was she ever equipped with a boiler that generated more than 150 pounds of steam, thus her engine never could produce more than 1,200 horsepower (890 kW). H.D. Collier worked on the Flyer, qualifying for his engineer's license. Collier later became chairman of Standard Oil of California.

== Operations on Puget Sound ==
Flyer on Puget Sound, sometime before 1895, looking west, with Olympic Mountains in background

Flyer was placed on the run from Seattle to Tacoma. Her first master was Capt. Harry K. Struve (1866–1924), and her first pilot was Capt. Henry Carter (1858–1930). The run was 28 miles (45 km) long one way, and Flyer routinely completed it in less than 90 minutes. This was the beginning of many years of successful timely service, so much so that the Flyer's advertising slogan became "Fly on the Flyer".

Flyer's career was almost ended at midnight on 14 June 1892, by a fire which started when she was taking on wood for fuel at the Commercial Dock in Seattle. Within five minutes the fire had swept through the vessel. The fireboat Snoqualmie and all available units of the Seattle fire department, under Chief Gardner Kellogg, responded to the fire. They were able to get the fire under control before serious damage was done to the hull or machinery. However, all of the vessel's upper works were destroyed. Flyer was quickly rebuilt and returned to service by the end of the summer of 1892. She made four daily round-trips between Seattle and Tacoma.

In 1900, there appeared on the Sound the Imp, one of the fastest steam launches ever built to that time. Imp was just 50 feet (15 m) long, but could go 22 knots (41 km/h) with a boiler that generated steam at the then extraordinary pressure of 400 pounds. Imp bested Flyer on the Tacoma run by eight minutes before she was shipped to Lake Coeur d'Alene in Idaho.

Flyer ran an average of 344 days a year, and had a public reputation of high reliability. In 1908 it was calculated that Flyer had completed enough trips from Seattle to Tacoma to go around the world 61 times, and had carried over 3,000,000 people, more than the population of New York City at the time, and this without serious injury to any passenger. This does not mean there were no accidents – over the years, she was involved in several accidents, collisions and fires, including some which threatened the lives of her passengers or those of other vessels:

- On 20 August 1896, Flyer was rammed by the steamer Utopia off Browns Point, near Tacoma. Captain John O'Brien was in command of Utopia which was then en route to Tacoma with a cargo of gold and silver ore. One Utopia crew member was killed. Utopia took on Flyer's passengers, and towed Flyer to Tacoma for repairs.
- On 6 December 1903, with Capt. William Williamson (1859–1930) in command on Elliott Bay, Flyer collided with the steamer Bellingham (ex Willapa), which to make matters worse, was towing the steamer Dode, bound for Whatcom for repairs. Captain Bergman was in command of Bellingham and with him on board was Captain Curtis, manager of the Bellingham Bay Transportation Company, which owned both Bellingham and Dode. Flyer left the dock at the foot of Madison Street in Seattle, and five minutes later Bellingham crashed into her. Both vessels were moving slowly on account of the fog, but even so the collision tore away a large section of Flyer's port side near the engine room. Dode under tow and with no power to avoid collision, then also crashed into Flyer fortunately causing less damage. This wasn't the end, as Flyer was unable to avoid collision with the moored German ship Chile. The revenue cutter Manning launched boats, which took about 40 passengers off Flyer, which managed to return to the dock.

== Success against newer steel vessels ==
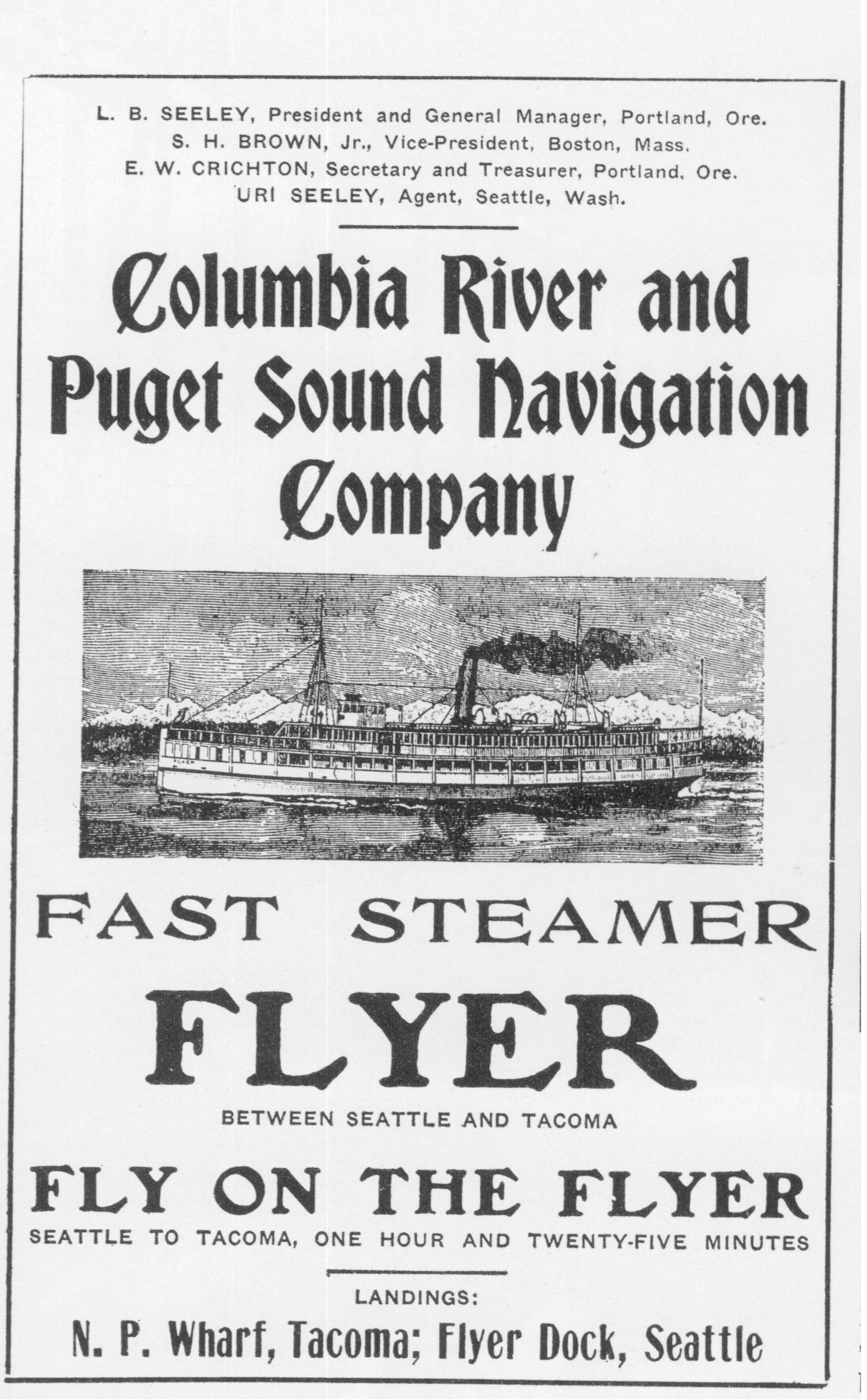
Advertisement for Flyer

In 1906, Flyer had an extensive overhaul and conversion to oil fuel to allow her to compete with the newer steel steamers that the Puget Sound Navigation Company had purchased in the Great Lakes and brought round South America. One in particular, Indianapolis, was being placed on the Seattle-Tacoma run in direct opposition to the Flyer. Passenger traffic on Puget Sound was then very high. In 1907, so many people wanted to travel to Tacoma on the Flyer that they were regularly turned away at the dock.

By 1910, the Puget Sound Navigation Company was well on its way towards achieving a monopoly on marine transport on Puget Sound, with the Flyer the only remaining major vessel still running against them. Flyer, although older, had a number of advantages over Indianapolis (then known as the Indian) and the other steel vessels.

- In those times before radar, knowing the boat's route well enough to run profitably day and night, in all seasons, in clear weather and fog, took extraordinary skill, using among other things, fixing the steamboat's location by the timing and sound of echoes from the vessel's whistle blasts, a skill that could only be reached with years of experience on the route. Flyer's officers did not change much, with Captain Williamson and also Capt. Everett B. Coffin (1865–1950) acting as her masters for most of the time on the Seattle-Tacoma route, and there was a similar lack of turnover among her engineers.
- Flyer was faster than Indianapolis. Although steamboat races were by then officially forbidden by company officials, Flyer's crews were continually challenging their counterparts to a race. Finally on 28 July 1910, the superior speed of the Flyer was firmly established, at least to her partisans, when on one of the rare occasions when the two vessels left the Seattle dock at the same time, Flyer beat Indian to Tacoma, unloading her passengers and departing for the fuel dock before the Indian had arrived.
- Flyer had a ready source of passengers through a contract with the Northern Pacific Railroad to carry rail passengers by water from the railroad's Tacoma terminus to Seattle.
- Flyer routinely docked without the aid of a tug. Her steel competitors could only do this with difficulty, and of course tug fees increased the cost of operations, so much so that the large Foss tug concern got its real start in docking these steamers.
- Flyer knifed through the water leaving very little wake, unlike the big steel ships which antagonized waterfront business by the big waves generated at their passage.

== Buy-out by the monopoly ==
From 1907 to 1911 the competition between the Flyer and the Indian continued. This was pursued on both sides by a variety of tactics, including Flyers honoring the tickets of the Indian's passengers just as the Indian was boarding. The Puget Sound Navigation Company became so desperate they started calling their own Indianapolis the "white Flyer" in their advertising. That didn't work, as the public still preferred the real Flyer. Finally the Puget Sound Navigation Company, realizing they were beaten, bought the Flyer on 7 June 1911. Said Joshua Green, PSN's president:

We paid what we consider to be a good plump price to the Columbia River & Puget Sound Navigation Co. While no steamer has a mortgage on a water route, we felt the Flyer had first right to the run and consequently paid a good bonus for it.

== Transfer to Everett route ==
A few days after the monopoly bought her, Flyer was placed on the Seattle to Everett route. She made a few trips under Capt. Charles Brydsen, and then Capt. Frank Clements, who had been first officer on the Tacoma run under Captain Coffin, was appointed to her command. Flyer broke all records on the Everett run, as she had done on the Tacoma route. She could complete the entire run, including a 12-minute stop at Edmonds in 1:50 hours, making an average speed over the route of 18.5 miles/hour. Later, when the sternwheeler Telegraph hit a snag on the Tacoma route, Flyer was put back on her old run until 1918 as a relief boat.

== Gangway accident at Colman Dock ==
On 12 May 1912, Flyer was at Colman Dock, disembarking passengers from Tacoma as several hundred people waited to board. Normally passengers boarded Flyer by a single gangway that extended from the waiting room on the upper level of the pier structure. However, a few weeks before, the steamer Alameda had collided with Colman dock, destroying a good part of it. As a result, passengers were no longer using the usual boarding method, but instead were using the freight gangways, located on the lower level of the pier. The freight gangplanks were large ramps 80 ft (24 m) and long 8.0 ft (2 m) wide. They were permanently hinged to the dock, and lowered down onto the steamer's deck, somewhat like a drawbridge. On this day there was an extreme low tide as the flyer approached the dock, and the freight ramp could not reach the deck of the Flyer. For this reason the Flyer's own gangplank was extended out to the end of the freight ramp, which was supposedly held up with chains.

The Flyer's gangplank was extended out to one of these freight loading slips. As the passengers were boarding, the slip locking mechanism gave way, the ramp collapsed into the water, and 50 people were tumbled into the sound. The captain of the Flyer saw the accident and immediately blew the emergency whistle. The fireboat Snoqualmie, which had come to the aid of the Flyer twenty years before, now again went to her assistance, as did the launch Skeeter, skipper Roy Lillico, and boat of the Rosalie, in charge of mate Louis Van Bogaert. The captain ordered the crew to toss life preservers and anything else floatable to the people struggling in the water. Major League baseball player, Rex DeVogt, assisted in the rescue, spending over an hour attempting to resuscitate one-year-old Carl Bruder. Within ten minutes, all but two people, Mrs. G.V. Leonard and Bruder, had been saved. Their tragic drownings broke the Flyer's long record of passenger safety.

== Reconstruction and last years of service ==
In 1918, Flyer was reconstructed at Seattle, renamed Washington and called up by the Navy for wartime service. By this time she had steamed over two million miles. After war service, she was returned to the Puget Sound Navigation Co. and maintained as a spare boat. She was also used for special excursions for about ten years. Despite the official change of name, apparently done to forestall rumors of unseaworthiness, the Washington continued to be known to her patrons as the Flyer. Every steamboat had a distinctive whistle, and people on the water or ashore knew by sound what vessel was near by the sound of the whistle. The Flyer's whistle was preserved, and is now mounted on the only surviving Puget Sound wooden steamer, the Virginia V. Flyer's compound steam engine was still in running order in 1929.

== Burned for metal ==
On 12 June 1929, Flyer was towed to Richmond Beach, Washington, and burned for her metal. Of this, the Tacoma Ledger wrote:

Once the speediest of all passenger ships on Puget Sound, the steamer Washington, the former Flyer, went to an inglorious end on a burning funeral pyre at Richmond Beach yesterday afternoon while hundreds of onlookers watched the flames eat the heart out of the venerable Sound greyhound.
