= S. G. Simpson =

Early 1900s steamboat in United States

S.G. Simpson
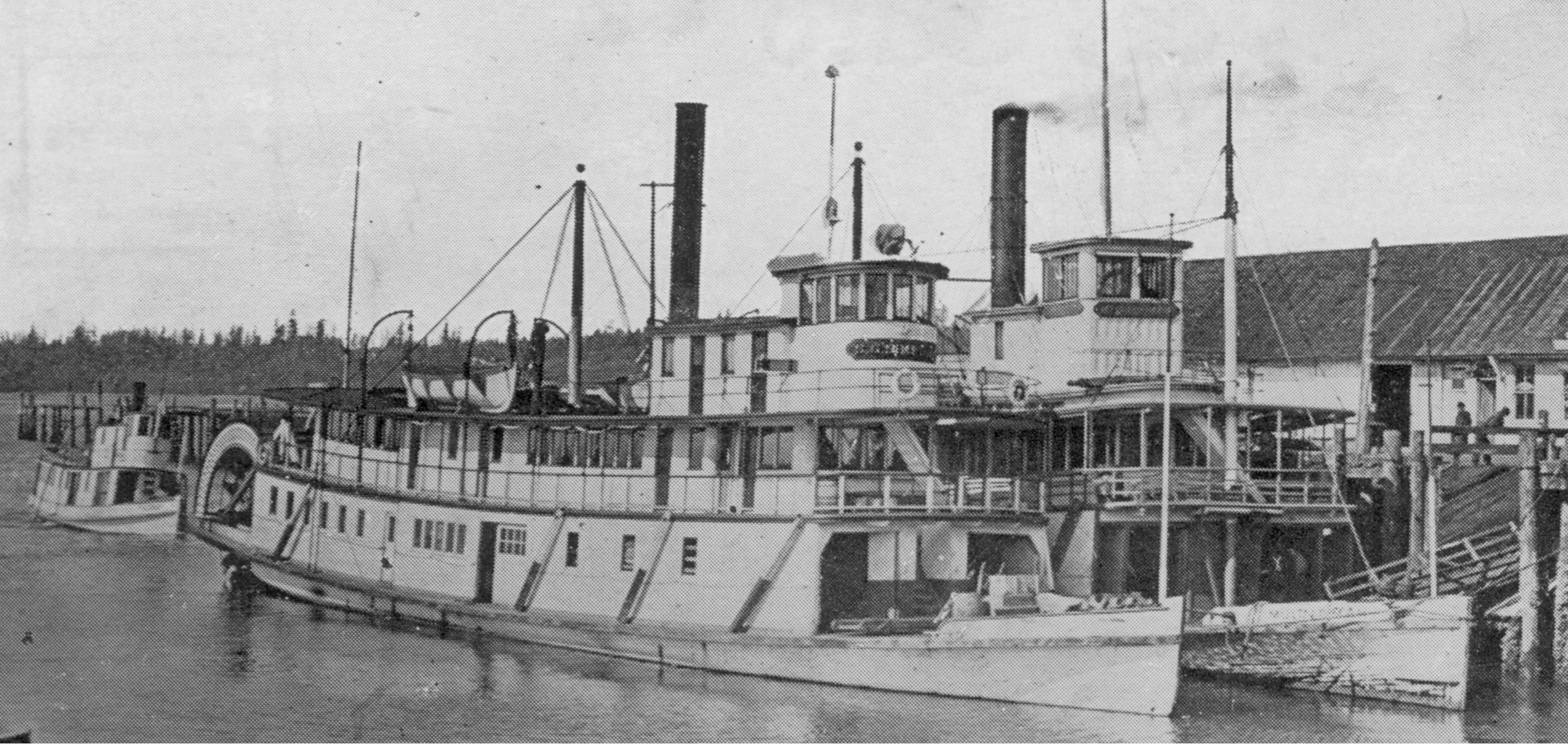
- Multnomah (on right) and S.G. Simpson (left) at dock in Olympia, circa 1911, with the smaller propeller-driven steamer Mizpah approaching at far left

History
- Name: S.G. Simpson (1907 – post 1927); E.G. English (post 1927 –)
- Namesake: Solomon Grout Simpson
- Owner: Shelton Transportation Company (1907–1926); Puget Sound Freight (1926–c.1927); Foss Company (c.1927–); Martin Tjerne
- Builder: Crawford and Reid
- Launched: 1907
- Nickname(s): Sol G
- Fate: Sunk as a breakwater c.1960

General characteristics
- Tonnage: 190 tons
- Length: 115.2 ft (35.1 m)
- Beam: 26.3 ft (8.0 m)
- Depth: 6.1 ft (1.9 m)
- Propulsion: Sternwheeler
- Speed: 15 mph (24 km/h)

The steamboat S.G.Simpson operated in the early 1900s as part of the Puget Sound Mosquito Fleet. This vessel was later renamed E.G. English.

== Construction ==
S.G. Simpson was designed by Capt. Ed Gustafson and built in 1907 at Tacoma, Washington by the shipyard of Crawford and Reid for the Shelton Transportation Company, to replace City of Shelton on the Olympia-Shelton route. She was a sternwheeler, 115.2 feet long, 26.3' on the beam, with 6.1' depth of hold, and rated at 190 tons. S.G. Simpson was named after Solomon Grout Simpson, a prominent man in the logging business in Shelton and Mason County. S.G. Simpson was launched into the water not fully complete, as some sternwheelers, such as Bailey Gatzert had been, but with only her hull completed, with her upper works and paddlewheel added later. S.G. Simpson made 15 miles per hour (24 km/h) on her trial run.

== Operations ==
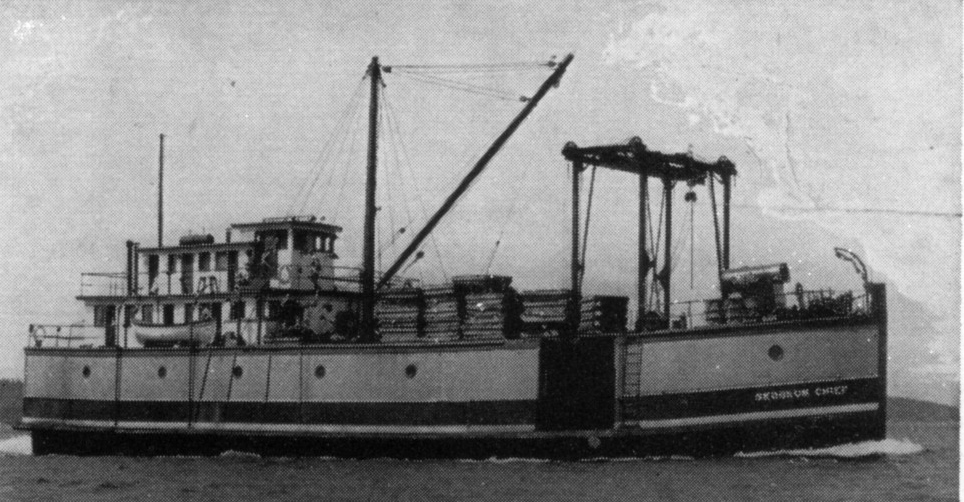
Her replacement the Skookum Chief

S.G. Simpson ran on the Olympia-Shelton route for many years. Her first master was Ed Gustafson, who served until his death. Later captains were George Melville and John Jones. Exceptional skill was required to navigate the tricky waters of Hammersley Inlet leading to Shelton. S.G. Simpson's nickname was Sol G and she was the last of the sternwheelers to run on the Shelton route, outlasting many other steamboats of the Mosquito Fleet.

In 1923, S.G. Simpson was chartered by Puget Sound Freight Lines to replace their new motor freighter Rubaiyat, which had capsized and sunk in Tacoma harbor in late September after taking on a load of gypsum, killing four of her crew. In 1926 Puget Sound Freight Lines purchased S.G. Simpson outright, keeping on her officers, George Melville, master, John Jones, mate, John Leslie, Chief Engineer, and George Foss, purser.

In about 1927, Puget Sound Freight Lines sold S.G. Simpson to the Foss Company, replacing her with Skookum Chief (ex K. L. Ames), a former sternwheeler rebuilt into a diesel propeller craft. Foss later sold S.G. Simpson to Martin Tjerne, of Stanwood who renamed her E.G. English, removed her passenger cabin, and placed her on the Skagit River service as a towboat.

== Disposition ==
By the early 1940s, the former S.G. Simpson had been abandoned on a beach. Hearing of this, officials of the Simpson Lumber Company began to make plans to return her to Shelton and restore her as a museum. Before this could happen, the Army Corps of Engineers dragged the hull off the beach, filled it with rocks, and sank it to form part of a breakwater. This was unfortunate, as S.G. Simpson had been the last surviving sternwheeler to operate on Puget Sound. Her paddle wheel was visible on the beach where she'd been abandoned as late as 1960.
