= City of Shelton (sternwheeler) =

Steamboat built in 1895

- City of Shelton

History
- Name: City of Shelton
- Owner: Shelton Transportation Company
- Route: Olympia-Shelton
- Completed: 1895 at Shelton, Washington
- In service: 1895
- Out of service: 1912
- Fate: Moored Dead Water Slough on Snohomish River, 1912, deteriorated and fell apart by the 1930s

General characteristics
- Type: Inland and riverine passenger/freighter
- Tonnage: 190
- Length: 99.8 ft (30.4 m)
- Beam: 20.5 ft (6.2 m)
- Depth: 6 ft (1.8 m)
- Installed power: steam
- Propulsion: sternwheel

The steamboat City of Shelton operated in the 1890s and early 1900s as part of the Puget Sound Mosquito Fleet.

== Construction ==
City of Shelton was built in 1895 at Shelton, Washington, to replace Willie on the Olympia-Shelton route. She was 99.8 feet long, 20.5 on the beam, with a 6' depth of hold, and rated at 190 tons. City of Shelton was one of the few vessels built on the Sound at that time because an economic depression had driven down business.

== Operations ==
One of her competitors was Marion, a small propeller-driven steamboat with an award-winning triple expansion engine. Marion's crew derisively named City of Shelton "Old Wet-Butt" after the spray thrown up on her deck by her unguarded sternwheel. During one race, when Marion was running at full speed, her shaft broke, and she had to whistle for assistance to City of Shelton who towed her into Olympia.

City of Shelton once ran aground at Arcadia Point in a fog. While waiting for the tide to come in and float her off, the cook had himself lowered overboard in a bosun's chair and came back with three huge geoduck clams, weighing a total of 12 pounds, which he made into chowder. Newell describes the reaction of the rest of the crew:

Everyone was happy but the vessel's navigating officers. The mate summed up their attitude when he leaned from the pilot house window, ejected a quid of tobacco in the direction of the cook's trophies, and growled contemptuously, "Yah, you t'ink a steamer iss to dig clams."

In March 1905, following the recent loss of the steamer Clallam in the Strait of Juan de Fuca, steamboat inspectors cracked down and levied heavy fines against a number of steamboats on Puget Sound for inadequate safety equipment, including the City of Shelton, fined for having no signs advising passengers of life preservers, and no log of boat or fire drills. Her original fine of $500 (a lot of money for the time) was later reduced to $10, presumably as a result of curing the safety defects.

City of Shelton ran on the Olympia-Shelton run until 1907, when the Shelton Transportation Co. replaced her with S.G. Simpson. City of Shelton's last skipper on the regular route was Capt. Ed Gustafson, who with mate Ole Gustafson and engineer John Lesli took over the new sternwheeler S.G. Simpson. City of Shelton was kept on as a reserve boat until about 1912, when she was sold to the American Tug Boat Co., an Everett concern. George E. Barlow (1842-1912) was another captain of City of Shelton.

== Abandonment ==
Her new owners did not put City of Shelton to use, but simply moored her on Dead Water Slough in the Snohomish River with the Edison where eventually she fell apart in about 1930.

== See also ==
S.G. Simpson (sternwheeler)
