= Dawn (1914 ship) =

Passenger ship

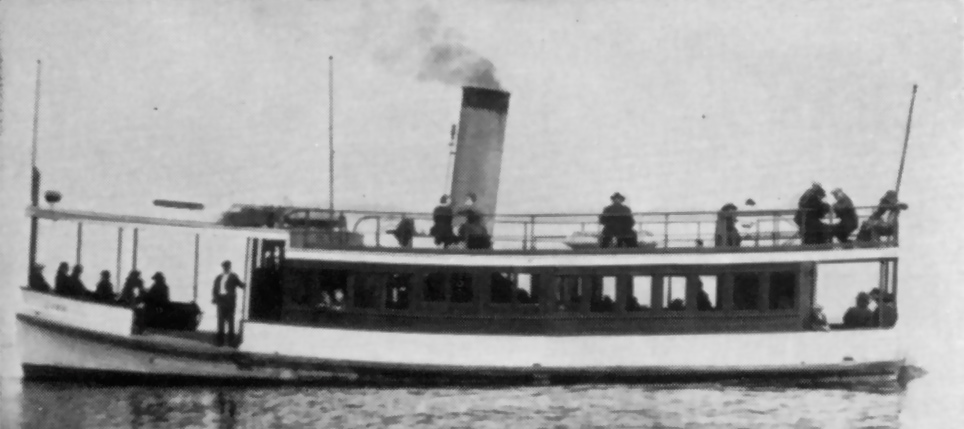
- Steamboat Dawn

History

United States
- Name: Dawn
- Builder: Anderson Shipyard
- Cost: $7,500
- Launched: June 1914
- Out of service: 1938
- Fate: Scuttled in Lake Washington in 1946

General characteristics
- Displacement: 70 gross tons, 48 net tons
- Length: 55 ft (17 m)
- Beam: 19.5 ft (5.9 m)
- Draft: 3.2 feet (0.98 m)
- Decks: 2
- Installed power: 120 horsepower
- Propulsion: Steam engine
- Capacity: 150 passengers
- Crew: 2
- Notes: Official Number 212284

Dawn was a wooden passenger ferry on Lake Washington in the early part of the twentieth century.

== Construction ==
Dawn was built by the Anderson Steamboat Company to replace Urania, which burned to the waterline in February 1914. She was built at the Anderson Shipyard in Houghton, Washington and launched in June 1914. The ship was 55 feet (17 m) long, with a beam of 19.5 feet (5.9 m). She displaced 70 gross tons and 48 net tons. Her engine and boiler were reused from Anderson's steamer Xanthus. The oil-fired steam engine produced 120 horsepower. The ship cost $7,500 to build.

== Operations ==
Shortly after her launch, Dawn replaced Triton on its route from Leschi Park to Medina and Bellevue. Anderson Steamboat Company made this substitution without obtaining a permit from the Port Commission of Seattle. The Commission cancelled Triton's permit in response. For most of the remainder of Dawn's career she sailed from Leschi Park to several landings on the west side of Mercer Island. Like the rest of the Anderson Steamboat fleet, she also sailed various routes for special events and private charters, such as the Shriners water parade on July 15, 1915.

Ferry service was critical to Lake Washington communities. Real estate interests, trying to sell land on the east side of Lake Washington, and agricultural interests, shipping food from the east side to Seattle, were particularly forceful in their desire for lower rates. The Port Commission of Seattle, newly established in September 1911, responded to these pressures. It placed Proposition 6, a $150,000 bond issue to operate a ferry from Leschi Park to Medina and Bellevue, on the March 1912 ballot. This Port Commission-owned ferry would be in direct competition with the Anderson Steamboat Company. Captain John L. Anderson, president of the Anderson Steamboat Company, fought this measure vigorously but lost resoundingly. The bond was approved by 71% of voters.

The Port Commission launched the steel-hulled ferry Leschi for its new service on December 6, 1913. The Port Commission undercut the prices of the Anderson Steamboat Company by operating the vessel at a loss. It budgeted $32,470 of expenses for Leschi in 1915 against expected revenues of $18,000. The private company could not compete. In May 1917, Captain Anderson took all his ships, except Dawn, Issaquah, and Arrow, out of service and announced his intention to terminate the Anderson Steamboat Company. Dawn, too, was taken out of service by the end of September 1917.

Residents around the lake complained of the loss of service. This popular displeasure and rising deficits brought about the consolidation of ferry service under King County. On January 1, 1919, the Port Commission transferred its Lake Washington ferry system to King County. Later that same month, Captain Anderson was named Superintendent of Transportation for King County, and was once again in charge of the dominant Lake Washington ferry fleet. Among his early actions was for King County to lease Dawn, Fortuna, Aquilo, and Atlanta to restore service on Lake Washington. Thanks to this lease, Dawn resumed her route in May 1919. The contract included an option to purchase the ships, which was exercised in 1920. King County bought Dawn, Fortuna, Aquilo, and Atlanta for $88,000.

Political pressure for cheap, abundant transportation produced a ferry system that cost King County $433,000 in 1920. Taxpayers who did not use the ferries objected to paying these costs. County commissioners wrestled with various proposals to reduce the taxpayer subsidy of the ferry service for several years and finally entered into a 10-year agreement with Captain Anderson on December 8, 1921. Anderson got the use of the County's ten ships on Lake Washington, including Dawn, the County's docks and ferry terminals, and 20,000 barrels of fuel oil. He could keep all the revenues from the ferries, but had to pay for all the expenses. In return, Anderson promised to maintain the existing routes and not to raise fares. This deal created a period of stability that lasted the rest of Dawn's years. She was owned by King County, operated by Captain Anderson, and ran on the Leschi Park to Mercer Island route.

On the afternoon of June 11, 1920, Dawn was shifting her berth from one side of the ferry dock in Leschi Park to the other in order to take on fuel. There were no passengers aboard. A seaplane taking off from the lake hit the ship. The pilot saw Dawn leaving the dock and assumed she would pull away from shore, allowing him to take off behind her. Instead, she stopped in order to pull back in to the other side of the dock, and the plane hit the ship on her port bow. This collision was the first between a seaplane and a ship on the Pacific coast. The plane was destroyed, but the pilot and passenger were able to step onto the Dawn from the ruined cockpit uninjured. Dawn's hull was punctured above the waterline by a pontoon and she suffered damage to both her starboard and port sides as a propeller blade flew off its hub.

Christmas Eve 1923 was a stormy night on Lake Washington, with gale winds up to 60 miles per hour (97 km/h). Dawn tied up to the ferry dock at Leschi Park at 12:45 a.m. after her last run from Mercer Island. At 3 a.m., the night watchman noticed that two bow lines had broken and that the waves on the lake were pounding the stern of the ship into a piling. The watchman called for help, but was unable to replace the broken bow lines before the piling punched a large hole in the stern. Dawn sank at her dock. The ship was refloated, repaired, and was on her regular run to Mercer Island by April 1924.

In July 1934, a strike by maritime workers in Seattle, caused a shortage of fuel oil. Instead of her normal 11 daily roundtrips between Leschi Park and Mercer Island, Dawn was restricted to only four. Full service was not restored for eleven days.

== Obsolescence and scuttling ==
In October 1938, Dawn was replaced on her Mercer Island route by the steamer Mercer. In her retirement, she was moored on the west shore of Lake Washington at 54th Avenue South and Rainier Avenue in Seattle. She sank at her moorings there, so that only her upper deck was above water. The hulk became a public nuisance. On September 28, 1946 King County Sheriff's deputies and Harbor Patrolman raised Dawn and towed her out into Lake Washington where she was scuttled off the southern shore of Mercer Island in 112 feet (34 m) of water.

Dawn came to rest sitting upright on the bottom. In the deep, still, cold waters in which she sits, she has been well preserved. The wreck has become a destination for divers.

== External Sources ==
See a photo of the 1920 crashed seaplane here.

See a video of a dive on the wreck of Dawn here.
