= Aquilo =

Aquilo may refer to:

- Aquilo (band), English musical duo
- Aquilo (god), Roman name for Boreas, one of the Greek Anemoi or wind gods
- Aquilo (steamboat), steamboat which operated on Lake Washington and Puget Sound
- Aquilo (steam yacht), private yacht built 1901 for William Phelps Eno

== See also ==
- Aquilopolis
