= Donna Nalewaja =

American politician and real estate broker (1939–2021)

Personal details
- Born: Donna Lou Speer Nalewaja; October 8, 1939 Winterset, Iowa, U.S.
- Died: September 30, 2021 (aged 81) Fargo, North Dakota, U.S.
- Party: Republican
- Education: University of Minnesota, Twin Cities (BA)

Donna Lou Speer Nalewaja (October 8, 1939 – September 30, 2021) was an American politician and real estate broker.

== Biography ==
She ran under Leon L. Mallberg for Lieutenant Governor of North Dakota in 1988 as a Republican, and for the North Dakota United States Senate in 1998 against incumbent Byron Dorgan. Nalewaja also served in the North Dakota House of Representatives for Fargo's district 45 from 1982 to 1986, and in the North Dakota Senate from 1986 till 1998.

Nalewaja was married to John, and had four children. She died from COVID-19 in Fargo on September 30, 2021, during the COVID-19 pandemic in North Dakota.

== See also ==
- North Dakota gubernatorial election, 1988
- North Dakota U.S. Senate election, 1998

== Notes ==
Party political offices
Preceded by Ernest Sands	Republican nominee for Lieutenant Governor of North Dakota; 1988	Succeeded by Rosemarie Myrdal
Preceded by Steve Sydness (1992)	Republican nominee for U.S. Senator from North Dakota (Class 3); 1998	Succeeded by Mike Liffrig (2004)
