= Urania (steamboat) =

American passenger and merchant ship (1907–1941)

Coordinates: 47.661777°N 122.226707°W

- Urania, probably near Leschi Park.

History
- Name: Urania
- Owner: Anderson Steamboat Company
- Route: Lake Washington
- Launched: May 11, 1907
- Notes: Official number 204149

General characteristics
- Type: inland steamboat
- Displacement: 93 gross tons, 63 net tons
- Length: 85 ft (25.9 m)
- Beam: 20.4 ft (6.2 m)
- Draft: 5.1 ft (1.6 m)
- Decks: 2
- Propulsion: steam engine; propeller
- Speed: 16.6 knots
- Capacity: 350 passengers
- Notes: Partially rebuilt in later career to carry four automobiles.

The steamboat Urania was a vessel that operated on Lake Washington and Puget Sound in the first part of the 20th century.

== Construction ==
Urania was built at the Lake Washington Mill Company shipyard, south of Leschi Park on Lake Washington. She was launched on May 11, 1907, and christened by Miss Daisy Johnson, daughter of her builder. She was commissioned by Captain John Anderson, to expand his fleet of steamboats on Lake Washington, operating under the name of the Anderson Steamboat Company. She was 85 feet (26 m) long, with a beam of 20.4 feet (6.2 m). She displaced 93 gross tons. Urania was similar to but slightly shorter than another Anderson vessel, Fortuna, built in 1906.

Her oil-fired steam engine was built by Seattle Machine Works. It was reported to be capable of producing 550 horsepower. Fully loaded, with 350 passengers, Urania could maintain a speed of 16.6 knots.

In 1913, Urania was reconstructed to allow four automobiles to be carried sideways across her foredeck. The reconstruction required removal of a portion of her upper deck.

The ship's namesake, Urania, was the Greek muse of astronomy and astrology.

== Operation ==
Urania had a regular run from Madison Park to Kirkland and Juanita, completing seven round-trips per day. She was also chartered for all kinds of special events including conventions, company parties, and as a viewing platform for crew races on Lake Washington.

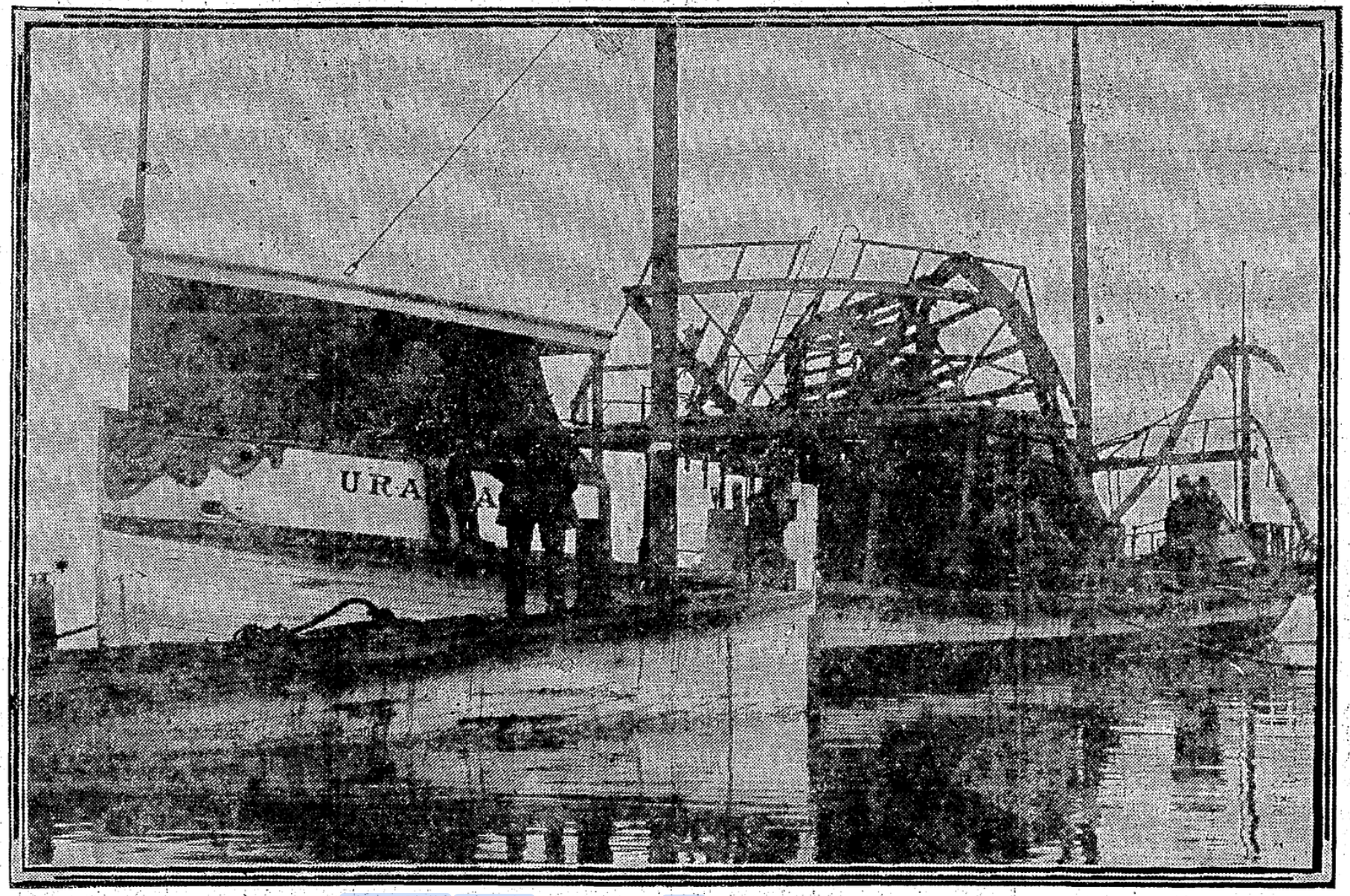
Urania, after the fire on February 12, 1914

Urania had her share of mishaps during her operational life. In August 1908, Cyrene's bowsprit punched a hole in Urania's cabin. In November 1908 she went aground at the entrance to Union Bay and was stuck for a day before she was refloated. On December 20, 1913, passenger John White committed suicide by jumping into Lake Washington from Urania's stern. The worst came on February 12, 1914. Urania burned at her dock at the Anderson Shipbuilding facility in Houghton. The fire pumps on Fortuna extinguished the flames, but not until after most of Urania's upper works had been destroyed. Captain Anderson built Dawn to replace her.

Urania's machinery was removed and she was rebuilt as a smaller vessel, maintaining both her name and Federal registration number. As rebuilt, Urania was 58.3 feet (17.8 m) long, 18.2 feet (5.5 m) in beam, with a displacement of 63 gross and 41 net tons. Her new engine was much smaller than her original, producing only 75 horsepower. By June 1915, she was back on Lake Washington as part of the Anderson Steamboat Company fleet.

Sometime between 1916 and August 1918, Harry D. Hanson of Bremerton purchased Urania. He operated her as a passenger ferry between Seattle and Bremerton as part of the H. D. Hanson Ferry Company. On December 7, 1919 Urania tied up to the company's float at Manette. Twenty-five passengers were waiting to board as fifteen disembarked. The boarding passengers moved to one side to let the arrivals off, and this weight shift caused the boat to list and then submerge. Forty people were thrown into the water and one drowned. Nine of the passengers filed and won lawsuits, but received no payouts as the ferry company had no assets. Hanson owned Urania personally, and did so through 1930.

Federal registration records show that William E. Westerman of Tacoma purchased Urania in 1931. These records classify her as a freighter at this time. Westerman owned her at least until 1941, the last time she was Federally documented. Her ultimate fate is unclear.

== Discovery of wreck ==
In 2002, divers of the Submerged Cultural Resources Exploration Team (“SCRET”) found a wreck they concluded was Urania, noting that she lies upright on the bottom, her hull substantially intact, but her upper works completely destroyed by fire. It is unclear how this wreck relates to the Urania built in 1907, or the vessel rebuilt in 1915.

== See also ==
- Steamboats of Lake Washington
- Puget Sound Mosquito Fleet
- Fortuna (steamboat), a similar vessel
