= 1998 United States Senate election in North Dakota =

- November 3, 1998
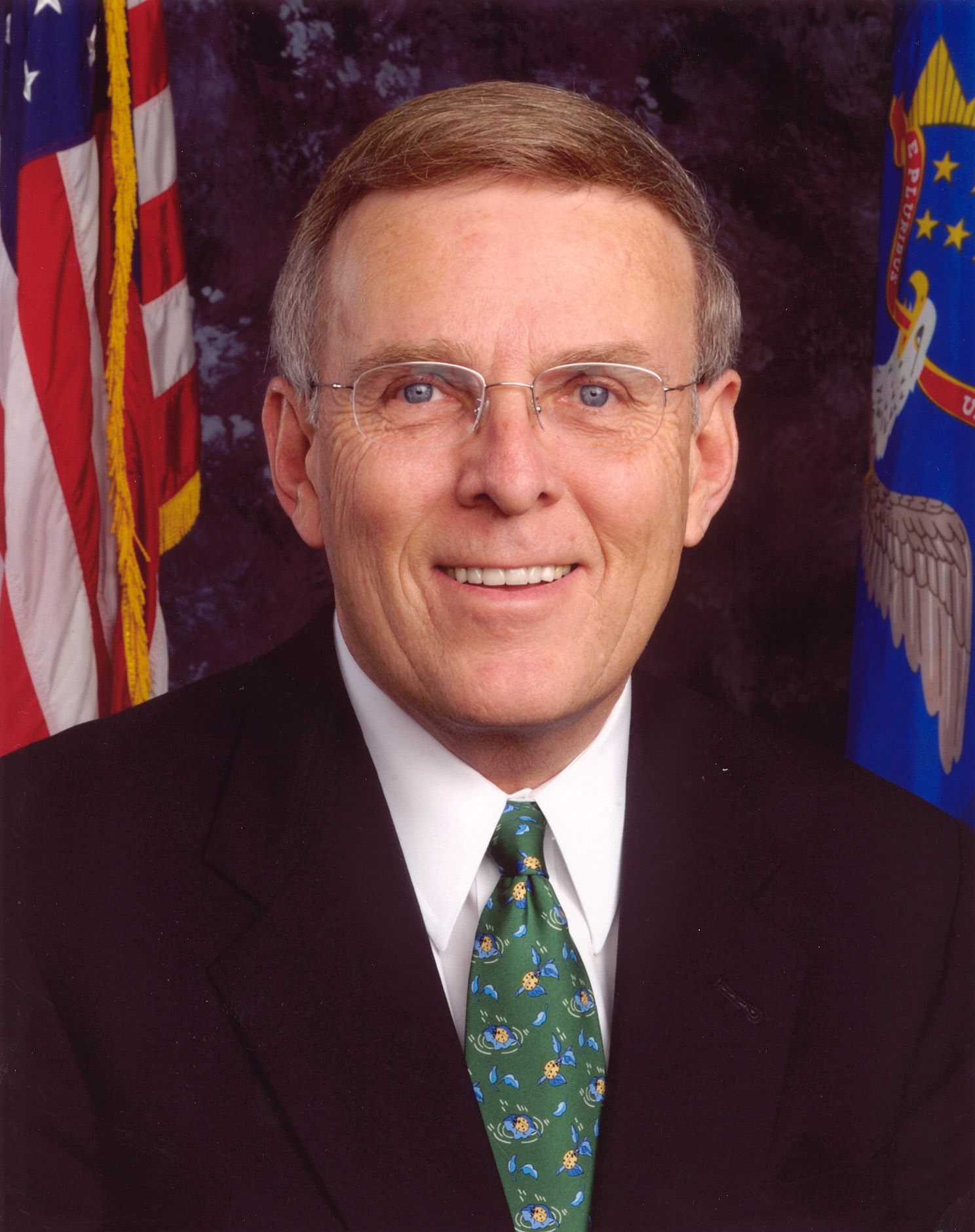

| Nominee | Byron Dorgan | Donna Nalewaja |
| Party | Democratic–NPL | Republican |
| Popular vote | 134,747 | 75,013 |
| Percentage | 63.16% | 35.16% |
- County results Dorgan: 50–60% 60–70% 70–80% 80–90% Tie: 40–50%
U.S. senator before election
Byron Dorgan
Democratic–NPL
Elected U.S. Senator
Byron Dorgan
Democratic–NPL

The 1998 United States Senate election in North Dakota was held on November 3, 1998, along with other elections to the United States Senate as well as elections to the United States House of Representatives and various state and local elections. Incumbent Democratic-NPL U.S. Senator Byron Dorgan won re-election to a second term.

== Major candidates ==
=== Democratic ===
- Byron Dorgan, incumbent U.S. Senator

=== Republican ===
- Donna Nalewaja, State Senator

== Campaign ==
Nalewaja's campaign focused on the suggestion that Dorgan had served in the United States Congress for nearly 20 years, and had accomplished relatively little. Dorgan and Nalewaja won the primary elections for their respective parties. McLain had previously run for this Senate seat in 1980 against eventual winner Mark Andrews and Kent Johanssen for the open seat given up by retiring Senator Milton Young.

== Results ==
1998 United States Senate election, North Dakota
| Party | Candidate | Votes | % |
|---|---|---|---|
| Democratic–NPL | Byron Dorgan (incumbent) | 134,747 | 63.16% |
| Republican | Donna Nalewaja | 75,013 | 35.16% |
| Reform | Harley McLain | 3,598 | 1.69% |
| Total votes | | 213,358 | 100.00% |
| Democratic–NPL hold | | | |

== See also ==
- 1998 United States Senate elections
