= Aquilo (steamboat) =

1909 steamboat

- Aquilo under construction

History
- Name: Aquilo
- Owner: Anderson Steamboat Company; King County, Washington
- Route: Lake Washington
- Builder: John L. Anderson
- Launched: May 22, 1909
- In service: 1909
- Out of service: 1938
- Fate: Sold for scrap

General characteristics
- Type: inland steamboat
- Installed power: steam engine
- Propulsion: propeller
- Notes: Converted to ferry for later career.

The steamboat Aquilo operated on Lake Washington and Puget Sound in the first part of the 20th century.

== Construction ==
Aquilo was built by Captain John Anderson at Anderson Shipyard as part of his fleet of steamboats on Lake Washington, operating under the name of the Anderson Steamboat Company. She was launched on May 22, 1909. She was christened by Miss Ethel Meek.

"Aquilo" was the Roman name for their god of the northwind. (Captain Anderson named his vessels after classical gods, starting with Xanthus and Cyrene.) The vessel is reported to have been acquired by Anderson Steamboat Company at a cost of $20,000 in April 1909.

== Operation ==
Publicly owned ferries operating on Lake Washington ran Captain Anderson out of the steamboat business by about the time of the First World War, and he sold his interest in the Anderson Steamboat Company. In 1920 ferry services across Elliott Bay from Seattle to West Seattle were terminated by King County which had been operating the ferry West Seattle on the route.

As a replacement, Aquilo was brought to Puget Sound from Lake Washington, and apparently acquired then or earlier by King County. The county rebuilt Aquilo's bow to allow her to use the West Seattle ferry dock. Aquilo could thereafter carry two automobiles on her foredeck (and thus technically may have become a ferry) but did not on the West Seattle run.

== Sold for scrap ==
Captain Anderson operated Aquilo as the lessee of King County's ferry fleet. In November 1938, he returned Aquilo, and another former Anderson steamboat, Atlanta, to King County. The county sold Aquilo for scrap to the Seattle firm of Pacific Metal & Salvage Co. for $360.

The steamboat Aquilo should not be confused with the steam yacht Aquilo.

== See also ==
- Steamboats of Lake Washington
- Puget Sound Mosquito Fleet
- Triton (steamboat) – near sistership of Aquilo
