= El Primero =

American steam yacht built in 1893

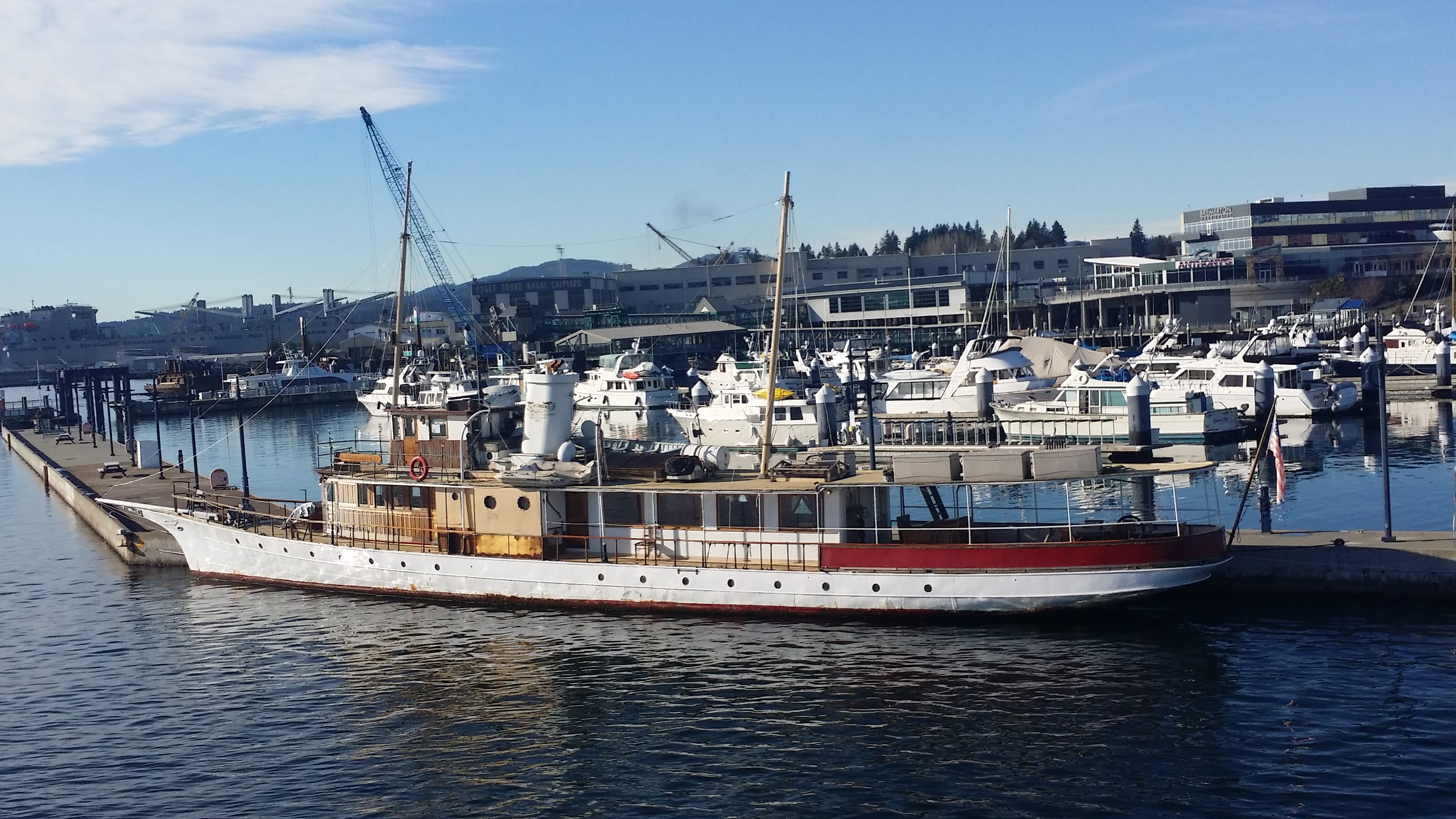
- El Primero 2015

History

United States
- Name: El Primero
- Builder: Union Iron Works
- Cost: $250,000
- Launched: 5 August 1893
- Completed: August 1893
- Refit: 2017
- Identification: U.S. Registry #136385
- Status: In service as of 2019

General characteristics
- Type: Inland steamboat
- Tonnage: 103 gross; 73 regist.
- Length: 120 ft (36.58 m) length overall; 108 ft (32.92 m) waterline length
- Beam: 18 ft (5.49 m)
- Draft: 5.5 ft (1.68 m)
- Depth: 8.7 ft (2.65 m) depth of hold.
- Installed power: Compound steam engine, three cylinder triple expansion; cylinder bores 8 in (20.3 cm), 12 in (30.5 cm) and 20 in (50.8 cm); stroke 12 in (30.5 cm); 200 nominal HP; 225 indicated HP; converted to diesel propulsion in late 1960s.
- Sail plan: Schooner (auxiliary rig)
- Crew: six (6)

El Primero is a steam yacht that was built in 1893. This vessel was once considered one of the most luxurious yachts on the West Coast of the United States, and was one of the few steam yachts to be operated on Puget Sound. The yacht has since been converted to diesel, but it remained operational as of 2010.

== Design and construction ==
El Primero (constructed in San Francisco, California) was the first steam yacht built on the west coast of the United States. The yacht had an auxiliary sail rig. The steam engine was rated at 225 indicated horsepower, driving the vessel at a maximum speed of 13.5 knots.

== Career ==
The yacht's original owner was Edward W. Hopkins, heir to the wealth of his uncle, Mark Hopkins, for whom the Mark Hopkins Hotel is named. In 1896 Hopkins was a member of the San Francisco and the Pacific yacht clubs.

In 1906 Hopkins sold the yacht to Chester Thorne of Tacoma and the yacht thereafter came to be based in Puget Sound. Thorne in turn wagered the yacht in a craps game and lost the game and thus the yacht to Sidney Albert "Sam" Perkins (1865–1955), a newspaper publisher. El Primero transported four different presidents, including William Howard Taft when he came to Seattle to visit the Alaska-Yukon-Pacific Exposition in 1909.

During World War II the yacht was taken into the U.S. Navy as a patrol vessel and returned to Perkins in 1947. During the 1950s, there were only two steam yachts operational on Puget Sound: El Primero and Aquilo.

After Perkins' death in 1955, the yacht went to his heirs and was later purchased by Sy Devening who was doing business as Puget Sound Excursion Lines, who converted it to diesel power. The yacht passed through two subsequent owners, an American (Arther B. Church) as well as a Canadian and was taken out of service in the year 2000, remaining at a dock in Blaine, Washington.

In 2010, the yacht was purchased by a semi-retired tug captain and engineer. Encountering engine troubles, the new owner had the vessel hauled out at Port Townsend for repairs. With the vessel still in need of restoration, as of January 2010 the new owner was considering taking the yacht to Mexico or Thailand to have the work done. 2013 Ship proudly berthed and displayed at Bremerton, Washington Marina for maintenance, tours, and public functions. In 2016, the hull was repainted with the help of volunteers.

In 2017, El Primero underwent a refit at the Boat Haven Yard in Port Townsend. The main objective was to restore as many of the original features as possible. Some areas, such as the dining room, did not require restoration as it has remained unchanged since the ship was launched.
