= William Phelps Eno =

American businessman

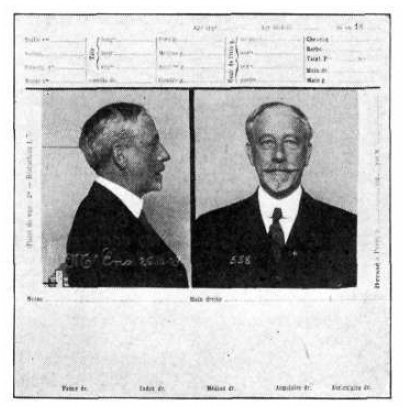
- Honorary driver's license for Eno, issued by A. Bertillon, Préfecture de Police, Nancy, France, 1912
- Born: William Phelps Eno; June 3, 1858; New York City, New York, U.S.
- Died: December 3, 1945 (aged 87); Norwalk, Connecticut, U.S.
- Known for: "Father of traffic safety"

William Phelps Eno (June 3, 1858 – December 3, 1945) was an American businessman responsible for many of the earliest innovations in road safety and traffic control. He is sometimes known as the "father of traffic safety", despite never having learned to drive a car himself.

Among the innovations credited to Eno are traffic regulations, the stop sign, the pedestrian crosswalk, the taxi stand, and pedestrian safety islands. He also helped to popularize the traffic circle and the one-way street, both older inventions. His rotary traffic plan was put into effect at Columbus Circle, New York City, in 1905; the Arc de Triomphe in Paris, in 1907; Piccadilly Circus in 1926; and the Rond Point on the Champs-Élysées in 1927.

== Early life ==
Eno was born in New York City, the youngest child of Amos R. Eno and his wife, Lucy Jane Phelps, daughter of Elisha Phelps. He attended Hopkins Grammar School in New Haven and Williston Academy, and graduated from Yale University in 1882, where he had been a member of Skull and Bones.

== History ==
=== Traffic regulations ===
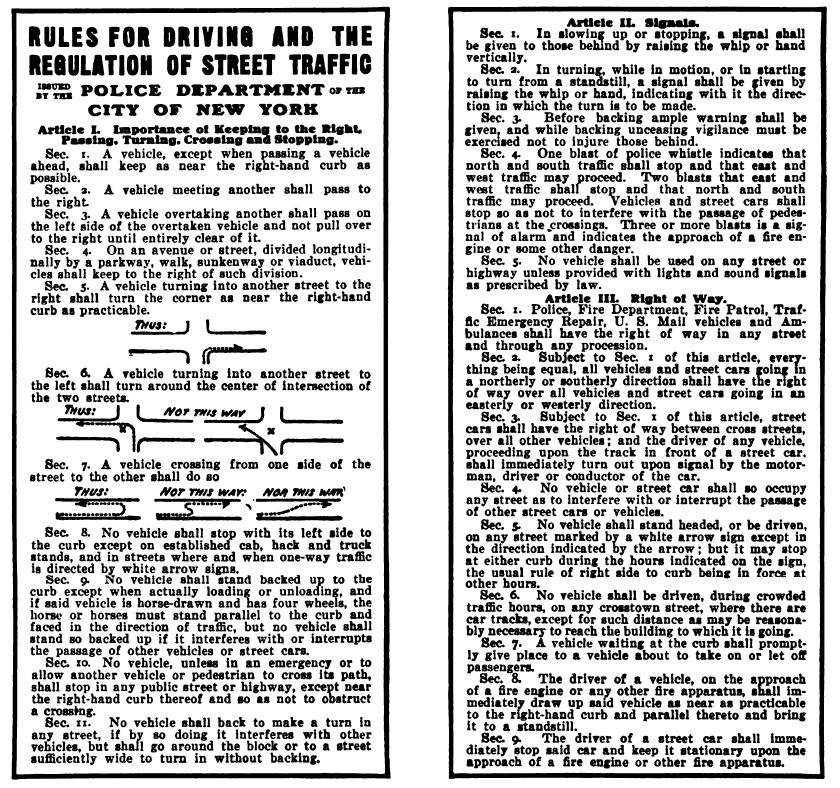
Traffic regulations first drafted by Eno, as issued by New York City on February 8, 1909

Though automobiles were rare until Eno was an older man, horse-drawn carriages were already causing significant traffic problems in urban areas like Eno's home town of New York City. In 1867, at the age of 9, he and his mother were caught in a traffic jam. He later wrote, "That very first traffic jam (many years before the motor car came into use) will always remain in my memory. There were only about a dozen horses and carriages involved, and all that was needed was a little order to keep the traffic moving. Yet nobody knew exactly what to do; neither the drivers nor the police knew anything about the control of traffic." As reported in 1909:

The regulation of street traffic was unknown in New York up to the year 1900, and although the number of carriages, automobiles, delivery wagons, trucks and other vehicles was much smaller than it is to-day, blockades were frequent throughout the city. Often the greater part of a day was consumed in transporting merchandise from one point to another, especially in the downtown shopping districts, while charges were proportionate to the time consumed. Quarrels between police, truckmen and cab-men were common, and it was only by resort to the "night stick" that in many instances blockades could be cleared away. There was no bureau of street traffic, no traffic squad and not one officer employed on the street to keep vehicles moving.

These conditions provoked much complaint and criticism in private and in public, but nothing was done to correct them until William Phelps Eno undertook to secure a change. He asserted that to accomplish anything worthwhile three things were necessary:

1. We must have concise, simple and just rules, easily understood, obeyed and enforced under legal enactment.

2. These rules must be so placed and circulated that there can be no excuse for not knowing them.

3. The police must be empowered and ordered to enforce them, and men should be trained for that purpose.

In 1900, Eno wrote a piece on traffic safety entitled Reform in Our Street Traffic Urgently Needed. In 1903, he wrote a city traffic code for New York, the first such code in the world, and subsequently designed traffic plans for New York, London, and Paris.

=== Rotaries (traffic circles) ===
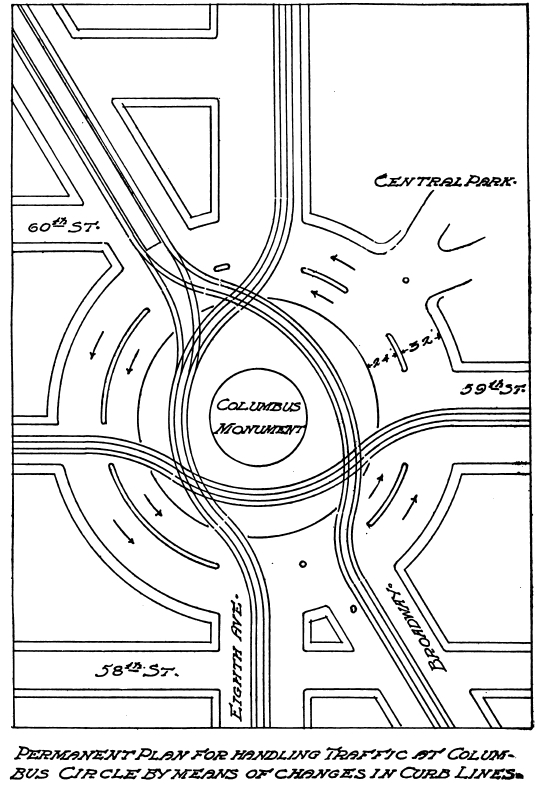
Columbus Circle rotary plan in Eno's Street Traffic Regulation, 1909

During that same year, Eno proposed the first version of today's roundabouts or traffic circles, which he termed "the rotary or gyratory traffic system". In his 1920 book, Eno recalled that "in 1903, the New York Police Department asked that a plan be suggested for Columbus Circle, where accidents were occurring almost daily. It was advised that vehicles should keep to the right, going around the circle in one direction instead of two. In 1905, the plan was put in operation.... In 1907, the system was put in operation at the Arc de Triomphe in Paris, but whether due to the suggestion sent them from New York or not is not clear." His 1909 book, Street Traffic Regulation, contains a diagram of the Columbus Circle rotary.

=== One-way streets ===
Eno also appears to have introduced one-way streets, as recalled in The Science of Highway Traffic Regulation 1899-1920, page 39: "On the author's advice, One-Way Traffic was put in force in a few streets in New York in the spring of 1908; in Boston in the autumn of the same year; in Paris in 1909, where it has since been greatly extended, and in Buenos Aires in 1910. It is now used in many cities throughout the world."

== Recognition and honors ==
In 1921 Eno founded the Eno Foundation for Highway Traffic Control in Westport, Connecticut, today a think tank known as the Eno Center for Transportation. The Center is a non-profit organization with the mission of improving transportation policy and leadership. His Westport office has been recreated as the William Phelps Eno Memorial Center in the Simsbury Free Library in Simsbury, Connecticut.

Eno was awarded the cross of the Legion of Honour by the French government, and was one of the first honorary members of the Institute of Transportation Engineers. He was a member of the New York Yacht Club and the first owner of the steam yacht Aquilo, built in Boston in 1901.

== Death ==
Eno died of bronchopneumonia on December 3, 1945, and is buried in Center Cemetery, Simsbury, Connecticut.

== Writings ==
- Street Traffic Regulation, The Rider and Driver Publishing Company, 1909
- The Science of Highway Traffic Regulation 1899-1920, 1920
- Fundamentals of Highway Traffic Regulation, 1926
- Simplification of Highway Traffic, 1929
- Crime, A National Disgrace, 1938
- The Story of Highway Traffic Control 1899-1939, 1939
- The Parking Problem, 1942
