= 1980 United States Senate election in North Dakota =

- November 4, 1980
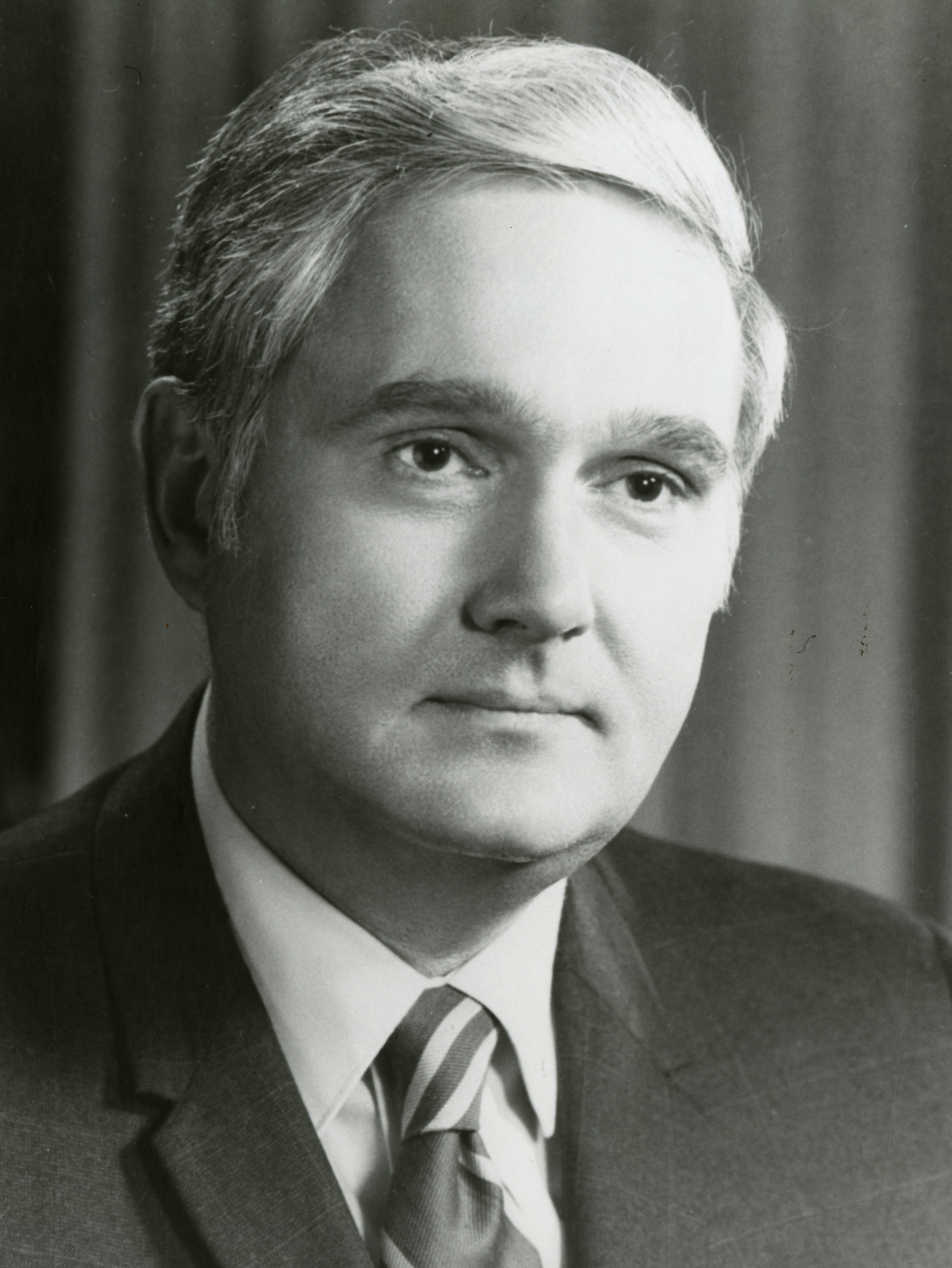

Nominee	Mark Andrews	Kent Johanneson
Party	Republican	Democratic–NPL
Popular vote	210,347	86,658
Percentage	70.29%	28.96%
- County results Andrews: 50–60% 60–70% 70–80% 80–90%
U.S. senator before election
Milton R. Young
Republican
Elected U.S. Senator
Mark Andrews
Republican

The 1980 U.S. Senate election for the state of North Dakota was held November 4, 1980. Incumbent Republican Senator Milton Young retired. Republican Mark Andrews defeated North Dakota Democratic-NPL Party candidate Kent Johanneson to fill the seat. This was the last time Republicans won any congressional election in North Dakota until 2010, when John Hoeven was elected to the Senate and Rick Berg to the House.

Andrews, who had served as a Representative since 1963, easily received the Republican nomination, and the endorsed Democratic-NPL candidate was Kent Johanneson. Andrews and Johanneson won the primary elections for their respective parties.

Two independent candidates, Harley McLain and Don J. Klingensmith, also filed before the deadline under the Chemical Farming Banned and Statesman parties, respectively. McLain would later run for the same seat in 1998 against then-incumbent Byron Dorgan.

== Election results ==
1980 United States Senate election, North Dakota
Party	Candidate	Votes	%
Republican	Mark Andrews	210,347	70.29%
Democratic–NPL	Kent Johanneson	86,658	28.96%
Independent	Harley McLain	1,625	0.54%
Independent	Don J. Klingensmith	642	0.22%
Majority		123,689	
Turnout		299,272	
Republican hold			
