= Byron Dorgan =

American politician (born 1942)

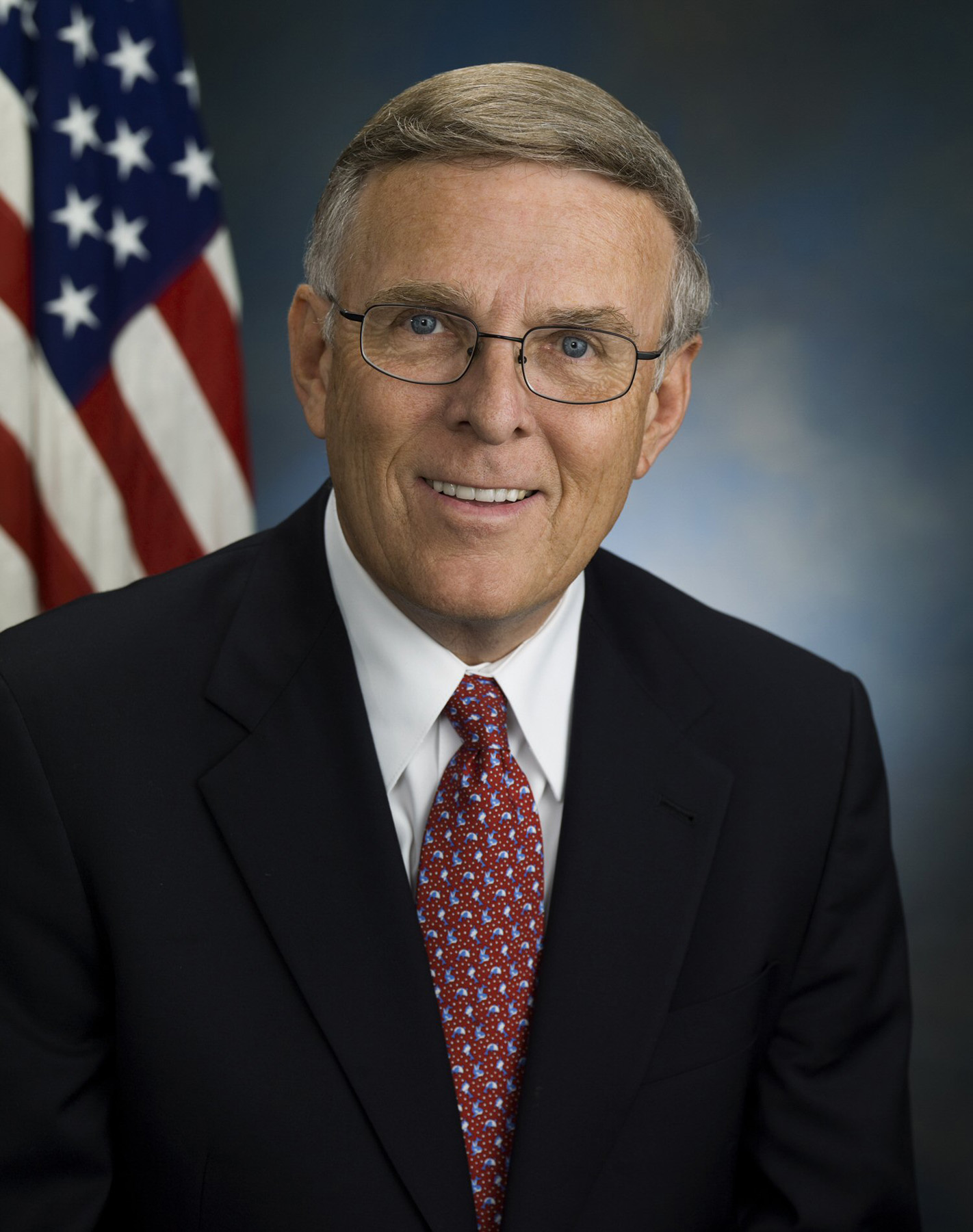
- Official portrait, 2008

Chair of the Senate Indian Affairs Committee
- In office January 3, 2007 – January 3, 2011
- Preceded by: John McCain
- Succeeded by: Daniel Akaka

United States Senator from North Dakota
- In office December 15, 1992 – January 3, 2011
- Preceded by: Kent Conrad
- Succeeded by: John Hoeven

Member of the U.S. House of Representatives from North Dakota's at-large district
- In office January 3, 1981 – December 14, 1992
- Preceded by: Mark Andrews
- Succeeded by: Earl Pomeroy

18th Tax Commissioner of North Dakota
- In office March 31, 1969 – January 3, 1981
- Governor: William Guy; Art Link
- Preceded by: Edwin Sjaasstad
- Succeeded by: Kent Conrad

Personal details
- Born: Byron Leslie Dorgan; May 14, 1942 (age 84) Dickinson, North Dakota, U.S.
- Party: Democratic (D-NPL)
- Spouse: Kimberly Olson
- Children: 4
- Education: University of North Dakota (BS); University of Denver (MBA)
- Dorgan's voice Dorgan supporting a new G.I. bill for Afghanistan and Iraq War veterans. Recorded May 20, 2008

Byron Leslie Dorgan (born May 14, 1942) is an American author, businessman and former politician who served as a United States representative (1981–1992) and United States senator (1992–2011) from North Dakota. He is a member of the Democratic Party.

As of 2011, he serves as a senior policy advisor for the Washington, DC law firm Arent Fox LLP. He was a member of the Senate Democratic leadership for 16 years, first as Assistant Democratic Floor Leader and then as Chairman of the Democratic Policy Committee and Chairman of the Committee on Indian Affairs. Dorgan announced in January 2010 that he would not seek re-election that year.

In addition to his work at Arent Fox, Dorgan serves as a senior fellow at the Bipartisan Policy Center, where he focuses on energy policy issues as co-chair of BPC's Energy Project and is also a member of the ReFormers Caucus of Issue One. He is an adjunct professor at Georgetown University; he also serves on several boards of directors, including the Board of Governors of Argonne National Laboratory and on the National Advisory Board of the Center for Arms Control and Non-Proliferation.

Dorgan is also a New York Times best-selling author of five books, including two on economic and political issues, two novels described as eco-thrillers and the latest book titled “The Girl in the Photograph” a true story about a Native American girl living on an Indian Reservation.

== Early life, education, and business career ==
Dorgan was born in Dickinson, North Dakota, the son of Dorothy and Emmett Patrick Dorgan, and was raised in Regent, North Dakota. His father's family was of Irish and Swedish ancestry, while his mother's was German and Norwegian. He graduated from Regent High School and earned a Bachelor of Science from the University of North Dakota and a Master of Business Administration from the University of Denver. Dorgan worked for Boeing and the Martin-Marietta Corporation in the aerospace industry.

== Early political career ==
Dorgan's public service career began at age 26, when he was appointed North Dakota State Tax Commissioner to a fill a vacancy opened upon the death of the incumbent tax commissioner. He was the youngest constitutional officer in North Dakota's history. He was re-elected to that office by large margins in 1972 and 1976, and was chosen one of "Ten Outstanding State Officials" in the United States by the Washington Monthly magazine. His future Senate colleague Kent Conrad worked in the same office before succeeding Dorgan at this post. Dorgan ran unsuccessfully for a seat in Congress in 1974. He was elected to the United States House of Representatives in his second bid in 1980. He was a member from 1981 until 1992, being re-elected five times.

== U.S. Senate ==
=== Elections ===
In 1992, the Democratic incumbent, Kent Conrad opted not to run for re-election because of a campaign promise. Dorgan won the election for the seat. However, that September the state's other senator, Quentin Burdick, died and Conrad ran for the seat in the special election. Conrad took the new seat in 1992 and Dorgan assumed Conrad's old seat a few weeks early. Dorgan was re-elected in 1998 and 2004. Conrad later was elected for a full term from North Dakota's other Senate seat.

=== Tenure ===
When Dorgan was chairman of the Democratic Policy Committee, he was one of the most powerful Democrats in the Senate. He was considered "something of a liberal hero." In the later years of his Senate career, he had been increasingly sought by the national media for comment on political issues. He was a strong opponent of continuing the U.S. embargo toward Cuba. He was instrumental in passing legislation to remove the embargo as it applied to the sale of food and medicine to Cuba. He introduced, with varying levels of success, several amendments to end the U.S. prohibition on travel to Cuba, and to terminate funds for anti-Castro broadcasting. Dorgan has also opposed most bills "liberalizing" trade policies between the United States and other countries, maintaining that most trade agreements resulted in higher trade deficits and shipping U.S. jobs overseas. He has a mixed record on tort reform issues, voting against the Private Securities Litigation Reform Act and the Class Action Fairness Act, but voting in favor of the vetoed Common Sense Product Liability and Legal Reform Act and the Protection of Lawful Commerce in Arms Act.

=== Chairman of Senate Energy Panel ===
Dorgan was Chairman of the Senate Energy and Water Appropriations Subcommittee and was also senior member of the Senate Energy Committee. He was an early supporter of renewable energy, sponsoring measures on the production tax credit for wind energy and creating a Renewable Fuels Standard (RFS) mandate to help build a renewable fuels industry. He also persuaded the U.S. Geological Survey to conduct and release the first official estimate of recoverable oil in the Bakken Formation in North Dakota. That estimate concluded that there was up to 4.3 billion barrels of recoverable oil from the shale deposits in North Dakota.

=== Chairman of Senate Aviation Panel ===
Dorgan was Chairman of the Aviation Subcommittee of the Senate Commerce Committee and worked extensively on aviation issues. He has served as co-chairman of the Eno Center for Transportation project exploring ways to reorganize the Air Traffic Control function at the Federal Aviation Administration (FAA) in order to accelerate the movement to the next generation air traffic control system using GPS as a replacement for ground-based radar.

=== Red River Valley Research Corridor ===
As a member of the Senate Appropriations Committee, Dorgan earmarked substantial funds to create a Red River Valley Research Corridor to bring new high-tech jobs to that region. The Research Corridor was anchored by North Dakota State University and the University of North Dakota, which became magnets for new economic opportunities and new jobs in materials science, micro and nano-technology research, unmanned aviation vehicle research, among others.

=== Campaign contributions ===
In November 2005, Dorgan was accused of receiving campaign contributions from people who worked for companies connected to lobbyist Jack Abramoff. Because Dorgan was the top Democrat on the committee investigating corruption charges against Abramoff, questions were raised about a possible conflict of interest. In a statement released on November 28, 2005, Dorgan responded by asserting that he has never personally met Jack Abramoff, nor has he ever received money from Abramoff. Dorgan did acknowledge receiving money from Abramoff's clients, but the donations began prior to their involvement with Abramoff. Dorgan's statement went on to say that he has supported the programs that benefited Abramoff's clients years prior to the contribution. On December 13, 2005, Dorgan announced that he was returning all donations from Abramoff's clients as a precaution to avoid any impropriety as the contributions may have been directed or requested by Abramoff.

=== Financial Regulation and the 2008 financial crisis ===
As early as 1994, Dorgan was sounding the warning about the speculation in unregulated financial derivatives, which was a central issue in the subprime mortgage crisis and subsequent 2008 financial crisis, by U.S. banks on their proprietary accounts. He wrote the cover story for the Washington Monthly magazine titled "Very Risky Business" warning of the danger to the economy of the wagers that large financial institutions were making by trading in unlimited derivatives.

In 1999, Dorgan voiced continuing concern over lack of regulation of derivatives.

We are moving towards greater risk. We must do something to address the regulation of hedge funds and especially derivatives in this country, $33 trillion, a substantial amount of it held by the 25 largest banks in this country, a substantial amount being traded in proprietary accounts of those banks. That kind of risk overhanging the financial institutions of this country one day, with a thud, will wake everyone up.

Senator Dorgan was one of only eight members of the Senate to vote against the repeal of key provisions of the Glass-Steagall Act (contained in the Gramm–Leach–Bliley Act) in 1999. During debate on that 1999 legislation, in a speech on the Senate floor, he said that, "it will in my judgement raise the likelihood of future massive taxpayer bailouts" (cited in John Lanacaster, Whoops, London, 2010, p. 161). On September 26, 2008, against a backdrop of growing economic turmoil caused by the Credit Crunch, David Leonhardt of The New York Times singled out a quotation made by Dorgan in 1999 during the US Senate's repeal of the Glass–Steagall Act. "I think we will look back in 10 years' time and say we should not have done this, but we did because we forgot the lessons of the past, and that that which is true in the 1930s is true in 2010."

On January 23, 2008, Dorgan was one of the first politicians to speak of the oncoming economic downturn in a speech to the Senate given in response to then-President Bush's economic stimulus package.

=== Additional Senate history ===
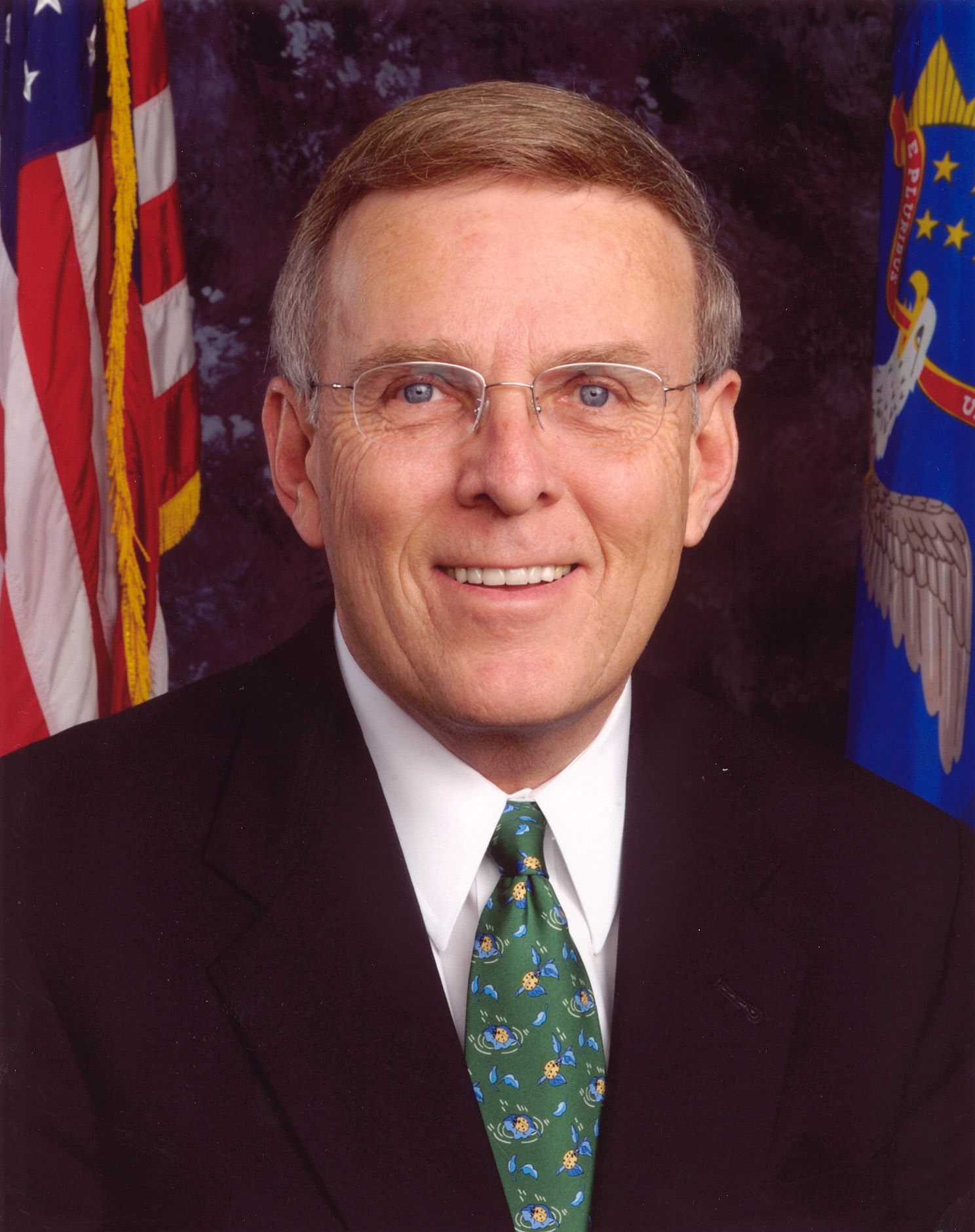
Dorgan in 2001

In 2007, Dorgan was a major supporter of net neutrality legislation in the Senate, seeing it as essential to keeping the Internet open and democratic.

In 2007, he was a major opponent of the McCain-Kennedy Comprehensive Immigration Reform Act of 2007 (S. 1639) saying that the legislation's guest worker provision would continue the downward push of illegal aliens on the wages of American workers.

In 2009, he voted along with all 39 voting Republican senators and 12 Democrats against an amendment to the Helping Families Save Their Homes Act of 2009.

Three times, Dorgan introduced a bill to form a new committee modeled after the 1940s Truman Committee to oversee Government waste, fraud, and corruption in the awarding of government contracts.

In 2009, Dorgan voted to approve the $838 billion stimulus package. The Senate voted 61–37 to pass this legislation.

In 2009, Dorgan sided with fellow Democrats to make funds available to modify or build facilities to allow Guantanamo detainees to be brought to the United States. This was a reversal from his previous vote to not allow federal funds to be used to transfer or incarcerate Guantanamo inmates.

Although Dorgan had indicated in early 2008 he would seek a fourth term in the Senate, on January 5, 2010, he issued a statement announcing he would not run for re-election. In it, he insisted that the "... decision [was] not a reflection of any dissatisfaction with my work in the Senate, nor [was] it connected to a potential election contest [in the fall of 2010] (frankly, I believe if I were to run for another term I would be reelected)." He gave his Senate farewell speech on December 9, 2010.

=== Committee assignments ===
2009-2010

- Committee on Appropriations
  - Subcommittee on Agriculture, Rural Development, Food and Drug Administration, and Related Agencies
  - Subcommittee on Commerce, Justice, Science, and Related Agencies
  - Subcommittee on Defense
  - Subcommittee on Energy and Water Development (chairman)
  - Subcommittee on Interior, Environment, and Related Agencies
  - Subcommittee on Transportation, Housing and Urban Development, and Related Agencies
- Committee on Commerce, Science, and Transportation
  - Subcommittee on Aviation Operations, Safety, and Security (chairman)
  - Subcommittee on Communications, Technology, and the Internet
  - Subcommittee on Competitiveness, Innovation, and Export Promotion
  - Subcommittee on Consumer Protection, Product Safety, and Insurance
  - Subcommittee on Surface Transportation and Merchant Marine Infrastructure, Safety, and Security
- Committee on Energy and Natural Resources
  - Subcommittee on Energy
  - Subcommittee on National Parks
  - Subcommittee on Water and Power
- Committee on Indian Affairs (chairman)

== Center for Native American Youth ==
Following his departure from the Senate, Dorgan announced the creation of a non-profit organization to help Native American youth living on Indian Reservations. He donated $1 million of unused campaign funds to create the Center for Native American Youth (CNAY), which is housed as a separate program at the Aspen Institute. The center works on teen suicide prevention, providing educational opportunities, and additional issues with Indian youth in the United States. CNAY sponsors a Champions of Change program that recognizes outstanding Native American youth and develops mentors for other youth. Dorgan serves as the unpaid chairman of the Board of CNAY.

== Personal life ==
Dorgan is married to the former Kimberly Olson, who was formerly an executive vice president and lobbyist for The American Council of Life Insurers. Together they have two children and a daughter in law. He also has 2 grandchildren. From his first marriage, Dorgan has one son.

== Writings ==
=== Nonfiction ===
- Electric Transmission Infrastructure and Investment Needs: Hearing Before the Committee on Energy and Natural Resources, U.S. Senate (editor). Diane Pub Co., 2003 ISBN 0-7567-2997-1.
- Take This Job and Ship It: How Corporate Greed and Brain-Dead Politics Are Selling Out America. Thomas Dunne Books (2006) ISBN 0-312-35522-X. (appeared on ''The New York Times'' Best Seller list)
- Reckless!: How Debt, Deregulation, and Dark Money Nearly Bankrupted America (And How We Can Fix It!). Thomas Dunne Books (2009) ISBN 0-312-38303-7.
- The Girl in the Photograph: The True Story of a Native American Child, Lost and Found in America. Thomas Dunne Books, 2019. ISBN 9781250173645.

=== Fiction ===
- Blowout (with David Hagberg). Forge, 2012. ISBN 978-0-7653-2737-6
- Gridlock (with David Hagberg). Forge, 2013. ISBN 978-0-7653-2738-3

== Electoral history ==
U. S. Senate elections in North Dakota, Class III: 1992–2004
Year	Democratic-NPL	Votes	Pct	Republican	Votes	Pct	3rd Party	Party	Votes	Pct
1992	Byron L. Dorgan	179,347	59%	Steve Sydness	118,162	39%	Tom Asbridge	Independent	6,448	2%
1998	Byron L. Dorgan (incumbent)	134,747	63%	Donna Nalewaja	75,013	35%	Harley McLain	Reform	3,598	2%
2004	Byron L. Dorgan (incumbent)	212,143	68%	Mike Liffrig	98,553	32%				

== See also ==
- 1986 United States Senate election in North Dakota
- 1992 United States Senate election in North Dakota
- 1998 United States Senate election in North Dakota
- 2004 United States Senate election in North Dakota

Political offices
Preceded by Edwin Sjaasstad	Tax Commissioner of North Dakota; 1969–1981	Succeeded by Kent Conrad
U.S. House of Representatives
Preceded by Mark Andrews	Member of the U.S. House of Representatives from North Dakota's at-large congressional district 1981–1992	Succeeded by Earl Pomeroy
Party political offices
Preceded by Kent Conrad	Democratic nominee for U.S. Senator from North Dakota (Class 3); 1992, 1998, 2004	Succeeded by Tracy Potter
Preceded by Tom Daschle; Harry Reid	Chair of the Senate Democratic Policy Committee; 1999–2011	Succeeded by Chuck Schumer
U.S. Senate
Preceded by Kent Conrad	U.S. Senator (Class 3) from North Dakota; 1992–2011; Served alongside: Kent Conrad	Succeeded by John Hoeven
Preceded by Daniel Inouye	Ranking Member of the Senate Indian Affairs Committee; 2005–2007	Succeeded by Craig L. Thomas
Preceded by John McCain	Chair of the Senate Indian Affairs Committee; 2007–2011	Succeeded by Daniel Akaka
Preceded by Sandy Levin	Chair of the Joint China Commission; 2009–2011	Succeeded by Chris Smith
U.S. order of precedence (ceremonial)
Preceded by Russ Feingold as Former U.S. Senator	Order of precedence of the United States as Former U.S. Senator	Succeeded by Larry Pressler as Former U.S. Senator
