= Triton (steamboat) =

Steamboat that operated on Lake Washington, USA

- Triton

History
- Name: Triton
- Owner: Anderson Steamboat Company; King County, Washington
- Route: Lake Washington
- Builder: John L. Anderson
- In service: 1909
- Out of service: 1916
- Fate: Wrecked 1916

General characteristics
- Type: inland steamboat
- Tonnage: 48 gross tons, 33 net tons
- Length: 78 ft (23.8 m)
- Beam: 18 ft (5.5 m)
- Installed power: 180 horsepower
- Propulsion: 1 steam engine; 1 propeller
- Crew: 3
- Notes: Official Number 206216

The steamboat Triton was a passenger ferry that operated on Lake Washington in the first part of the 20th century.

== Construction ==
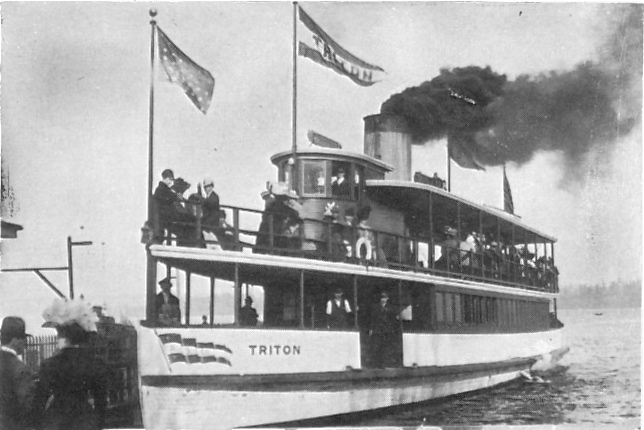
Triton

Triton was launched in May 1909 at the Anderson Shipyard on the eastern shore of Lake Washington at Houghton. She was 78 feet long and had a beam of 18 feet. Her displacement was listed as 49 gross tons. She had a 180 horsepower steam engine which was oil-fired.

Triton was built by Captain John Anderson to join his fleet of steamboats on Lake Washington, operating under the name of the Anderson Steamboat Company. Her original cost was reported as $20,000.

“Triton” was the Roman name a god reputed to be the son of Poseidon who was called the “messenger of the deep". Captain Anderson named his vessels after classical gods, starting with Xanthus and Cyrene. Triton was a sister ship to Aquilo, which was also launched in May 1909 by Anderson.

== Operation ==
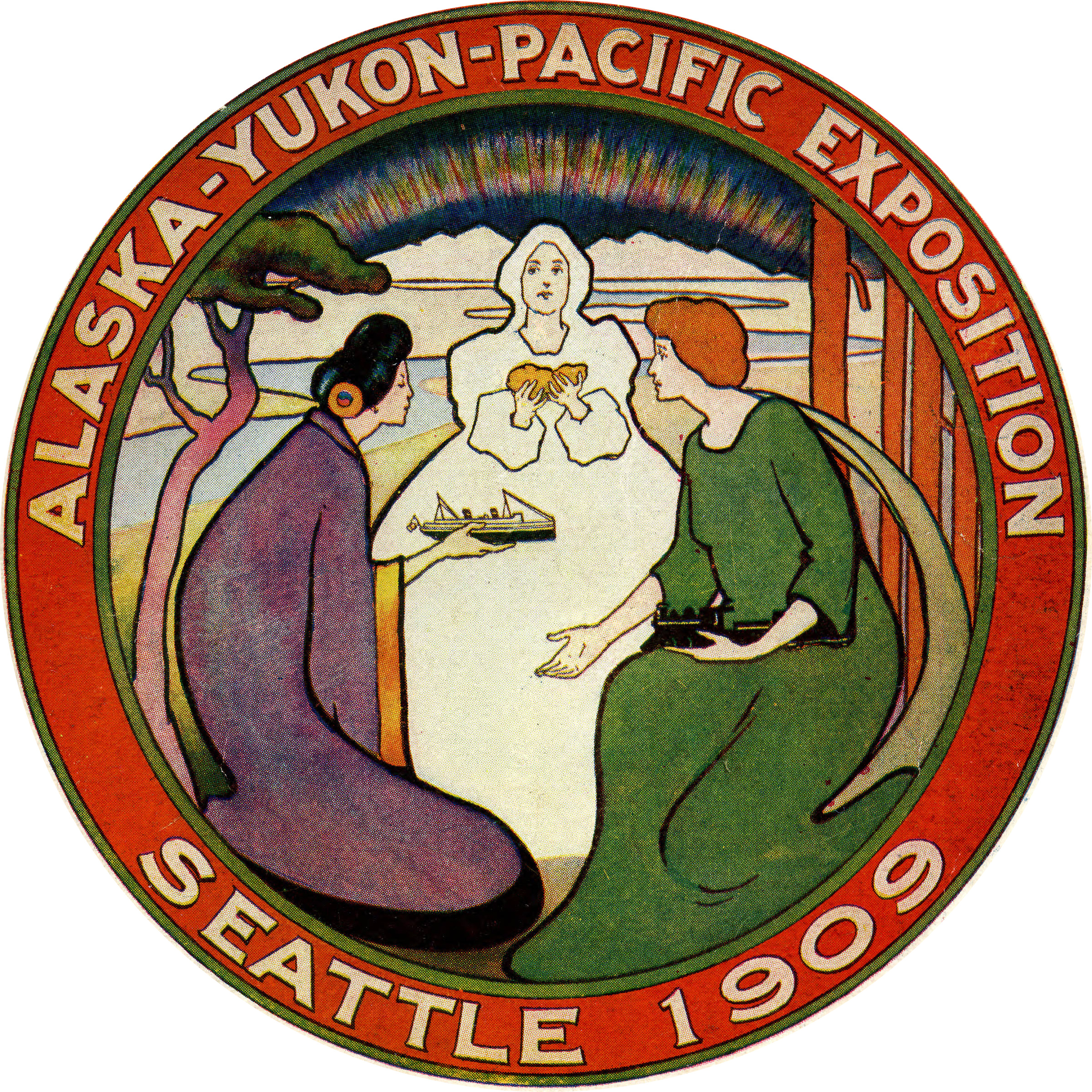

Triton's launch coincided with the opening of the Alaska-Yukon-Pacific Exposition on June 1, 1909, and one of her early routings was to bring visitors from around Lake Washington to the exposition grounds. In 1912, her regular route took her from Leschi Park around Mercer Island and back. In April 1914, the Seattle Port Commission granted a permit for the Triton to dock at its Bellevue and Medina piers. She completed 11 round trips per day from Leschi Park to Bellevue and Medina. By November 1915, however, Anderson Steamboat Company had substituted Dawn on the route and the permit was cancelled.

Triton was also used for holiday and special excursions. On July 4, 1915, she sailed from the Anderson Steamboat Company dock at Leschi Park for a circumnavigation of Mercer Island. The company advertised the trip as "25 miles for 25 cents". On Sunday July 31, 1910, Triton served the annual Seattle Newsboys Union picnic by running between Leschi Park and Wildwood Park.

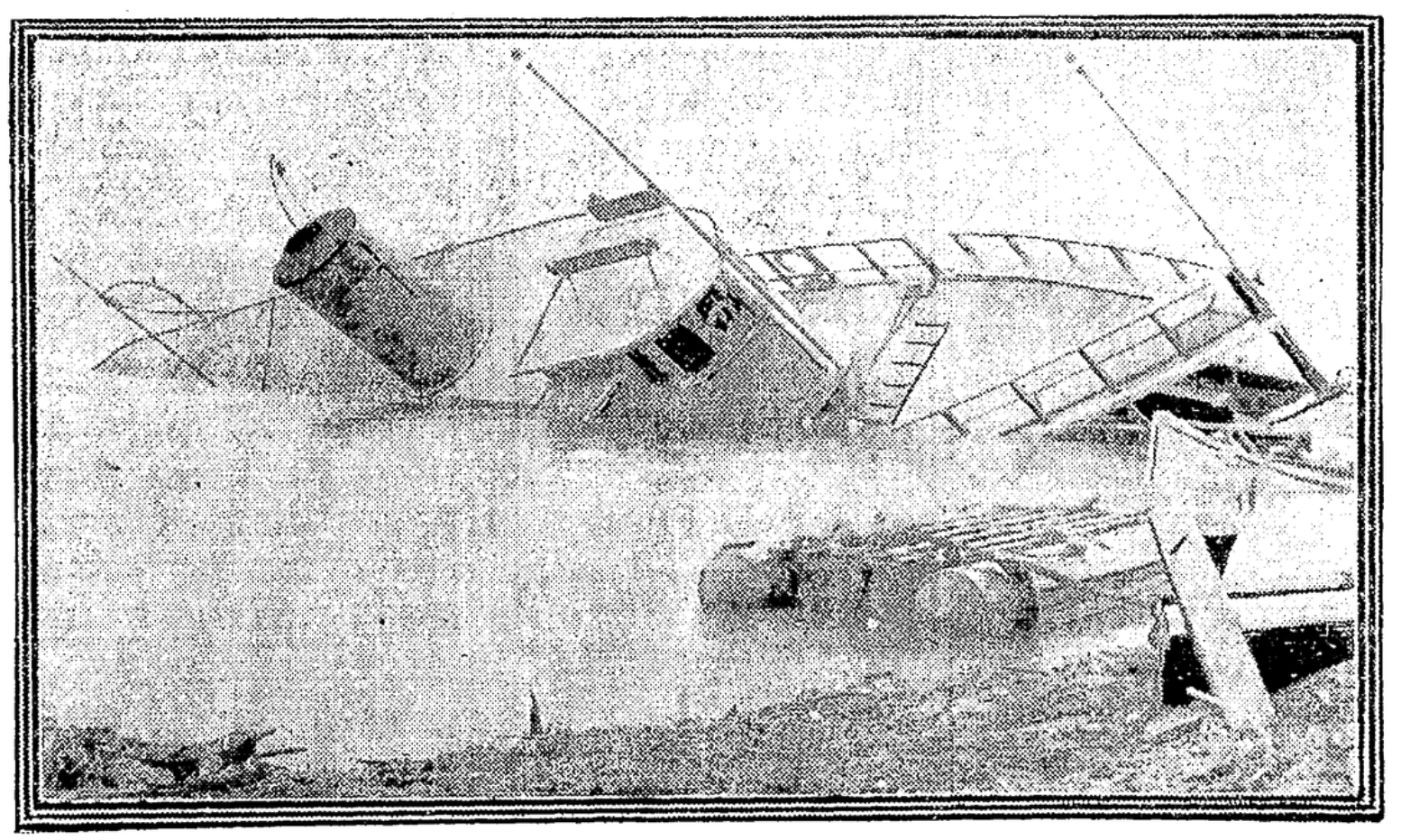
Triton, sunk on the south shore of Mercer Island

At about 4 p.m. on September 24, 1916, Triton hit a snag off the south end of Mercer Island. The snag punctured the hull but remained in place for several minutes acting as a plug. When the snag fell away, Triton began taking on water rapidly. Captain H. A. Riddle beached the vessel on the south shore of Mercer Island and safely landed the passengers and crew before Triton settled to the bottom on her starboard side. The accident occurred two months after the Lake Washington Ship Canal was opened and the lake level had been lowered by 7 feet (2.1 m). It was hypothesized at the time that this snag was one of many hazards that would be encountered with the lower water levels.

The ship came to rest on a steep underwater slope. The stern sank in 20 feet (6.1 m) of water, while the bow sat on the bottom in 7 feet (2.1 m). The Anderson Steamboat Company carried no insurance on Triton and it was acknowledged at the time that she might not be salvageable. It appears that Triton never sailed again. She is not listed as a company asset as of January 1, 1917 by the Public Service Commission of Washington and drops out of press accounts after her accident.

== See also ==
- Steamboats of Lake Washington
- Puget Sound Mosquito Fleet
- Aquilo (steamboat) – sistership of Triton
