= Lotus (motor vessel) =

Houseboat yacht

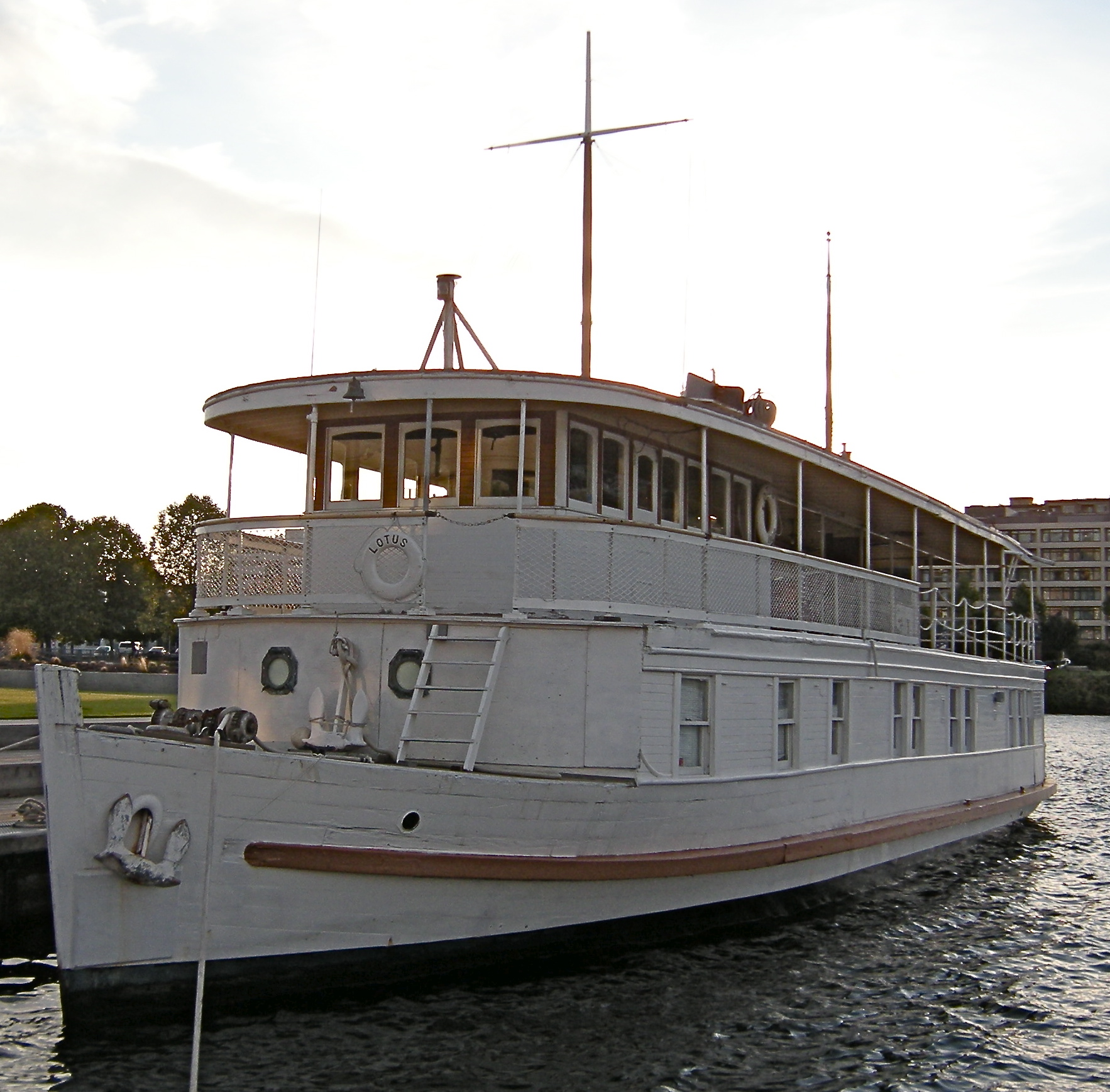
- Lotus in 2008 at Northwest Seaport on Lake Union.

History
- Name: Lotus
- Owner: MV Lotus Foundation
- Route: Puget Sound
- In service: 1909
- Identification: US registry # 206231; signal letters L.B.C.M.
- Status: Operational as of 2019

General characteristics
- Type: Inland motor launch
- Tonnage: As built (1909) : 130 gross, 88 registered tons
- Length: As built (1909) : 85 ft (25.91 m)
- Beam: 18.3 ft (5.58 m)
- Depth: 4.2 ft (1.28 m)
- Installed power: As built (1909) : gasoline engine, 80 indicated HP
- Lotus (motor vessel)
- U.S. National Register of Historic Places
- Location within Washington (state) Location within the United States
- Location: 860 Terry Avenue North, Seattle, WA 98109
- Coordinates: 47°37′41.8″N 122°20′12.5″W
- Built: 1908
- Architect: Lee and Brinton
- NRHP reference No.: 87000715
- Added to NRHP: 1987-05-18

Lotus is a motor yacht, launched in 1909 in Seattle, Washington. Lotus was employed as a pleasure vessel on Puget Sound, and in the waters of British Columbia and southeastern Alaska. Lotus was of a unique design and is now on the National Register of Historic Places.

== Design and construction ==
Lotus was built in 1908-1909 at Seattle, Washington for Maurice McMicken (1860-1940), a lawyer and businessman. The vessel was launched in May 1909, and was at that time the largest privately owned motor yacht on the west coast of the United States. The yacht was designed by naval architects Lee and Brinton, and constructed by Joseph A. Sloane. The yacht had accommodations for a party of 10 as well as a crew of four. The yacht carried enough fuel to have a range of 1,500 miles (2,400 km).

As originally built, the vessel was 85 feet (26 m) long, 12.5 feet (3.8 m) beam, and 4.2 feet (1.3 m) in depth of hold. Overall size was 133 gross and 88 registered tons. Only two crew were required according to the 1911 merchant vessel registry. As of 1911, the vessel was powered with a "Globe" gas-distillate (early diesel) engine that generated 80 indicated horsepower. The vessel's U.S. Registry number was US registry # 206231 and the signal letters were L.B.C.M

== Career ==
McMicken owned Lotus until his death in 1940. He used the yacht to cruise the waters of Washington, British Columbia, and southeast Alaska. Shortage of fuel forced the yacht to be tied up throughout the Second World War. McMicken's heirs sold the yacht in 1947. The yacht was sold again in 1951 to a family which moored the yacht in Lake Union and lived on it as a full-time residence. In 1961 the yacht was sold again, to Maj. (later Col.) Curtis Gruye, an Air Force officer, and a jet pilot. Gruye restored the yacht and operated it as a floating hotel for a number of years. In 1977, Gruye sold the yacht to Gordon R. Newell, an author and maritime historian. Newell moved the yacht to a marina in Olympia, where the yacht remained. In 1981, Gruye bought the yacht back from Newell, and began an extensive restoration program, which by 1982 was able to return the yacht to an operable condition.

== Current status ==
Lotus was listed on the National Register of Historic Places in 1987. It is now maintained by the Motor Vessel Lotus Foundation, a non-profit, all-volunteer organization, and is moored in the Historic Ships Wharf at the Center for Wooden Boats in Seattle, Washington.
