= 1992 United States Senate election in North Dakota =

- November 3, 1992
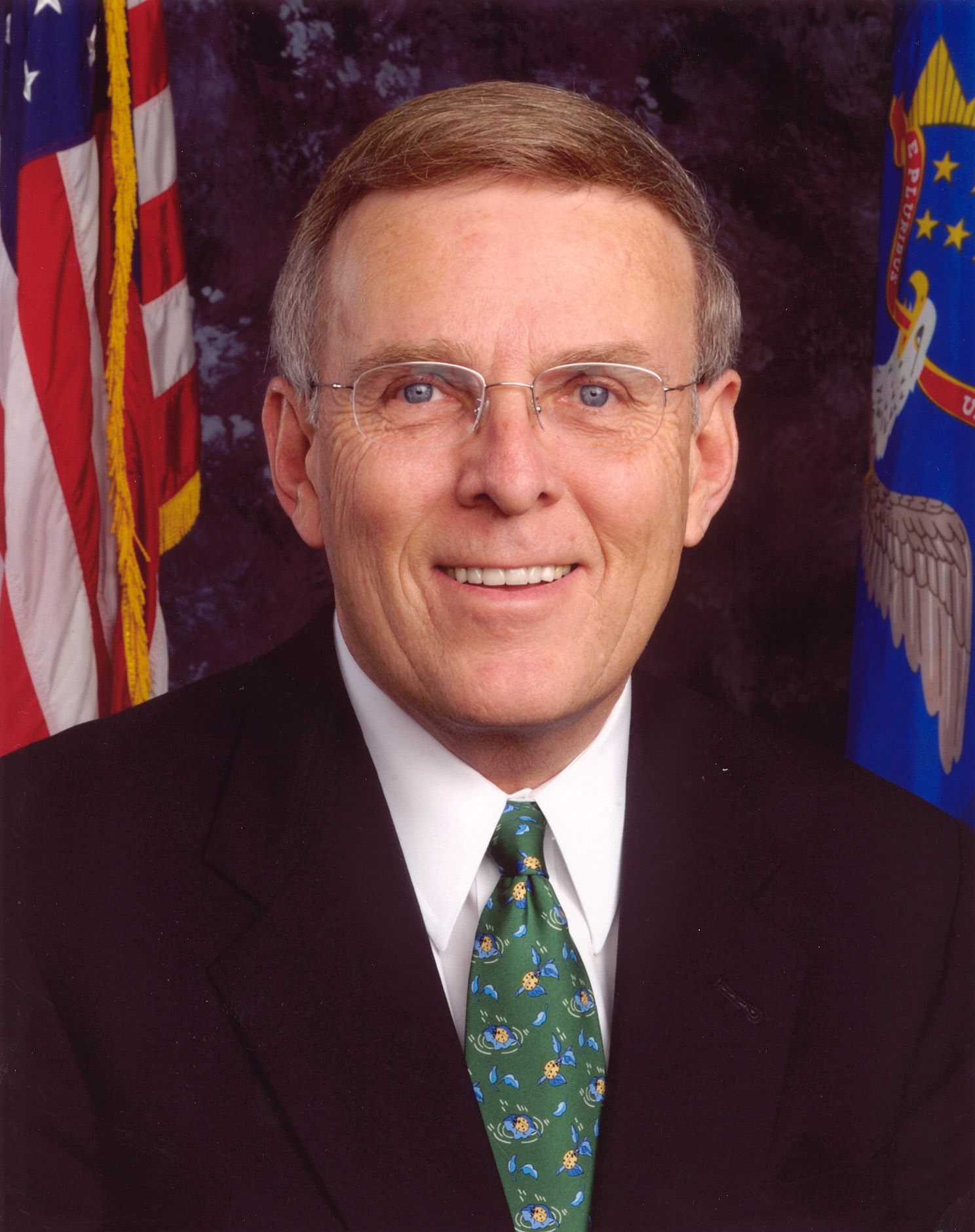

Nominee	Byron Dorgan	Steve Sydness
Party	Democratic–NPL	Republican
Popular vote	179,347	118,162
Percentage	59.00%	38.87%
- County results Dorgan: 50–60% 60–70% 70–80% Sydness: 50–60%
U.S. senator before election
Kent Conrad
Democratic–NPL
Elected U.S. Senator
Byron Dorgan
Democratic–NPL

The 1992 United States Senate election in North Dakota was held on November 3, 1992, along with other elections to the United States Senate in other states as well as elections to the United States House of Representatives and various state and local elections. Incumbent Democratic-NPL U.S. Senator Kent Conrad retired, having given a pledge that he would not run for re-election if the federal budget deficit was higher than when he was first elected; however, when the other Senate seat became vacant, he ran in the special election and won. Democratic-NPL U.S. Congressman Byron Dorgan won the open seat.

This election was a rematch of the 1988 United States House of Representative election in North Dakota, where Byron Dorgan also defeated Steve Sydness.

== Major candidates ==
=== Dem-NPL ===
- Byron Dorgan, U.S. Representative for North Dakota's at-large congressional district (1980–)

=== Republican ===
- Steve Sydness, CEO of Endurance International Group

== Results ==
1992 United States Senate election, North Dakota
Party	Candidate	Votes	%
Democratic–NPL	Byron Dorgan	179,347	59.00%
Republican	Steve Sydness	118,162	38.87%
Independent	Tom Asbridge	6,448	2.12%
Turnout		303,957	
Democratic–NPL hold			

== See also ==
- 1992 United States Senate elections
