= Atlanta (1908 steamboat) =

1908 steamboat in United States

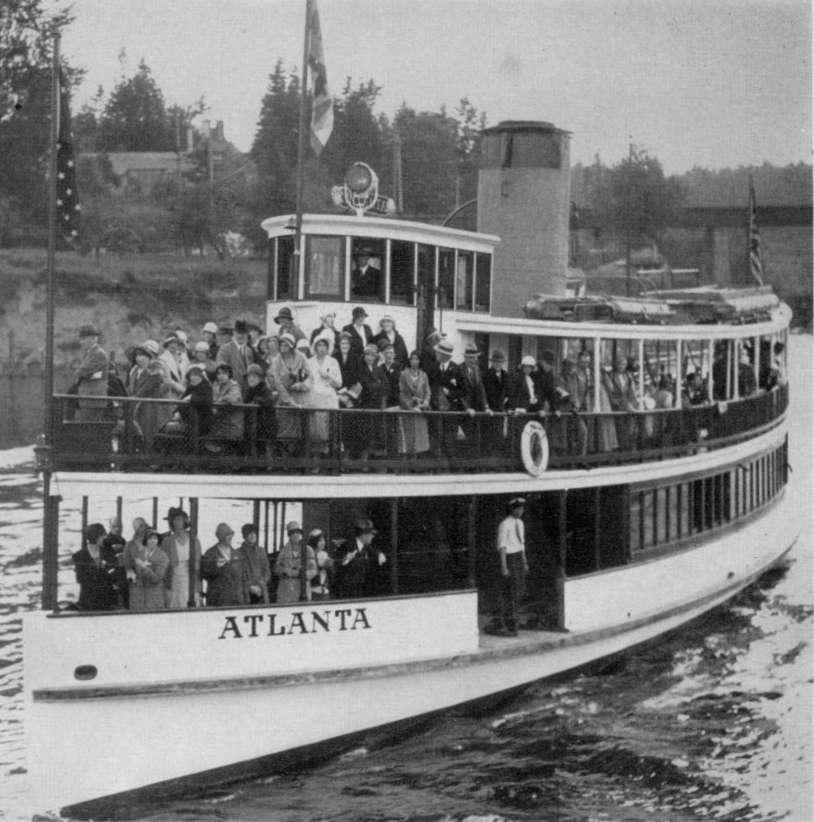
- Atlanta in 1931 carrying persons attending a medical convention.

History
- Name: Atlanta
- Owner: Anderson Steamboat Company and others
- Route: Lake Washington, Puget Sound
- Builder: Anderson Steamboat Co. (aka Lake Washington Shipyard)
- Launched: May 28, 1908
- Out of service: 1938
- Identification: US registry #205232
- Fate: Converted to houseboat

General characteristics
- Type: Inland steamboat
- Length: 95 ft (28.96 m)
- Beam: 22 ft (6.71 m)
- Depth: 5.4 ft (1.65 m) depth of hold
- Installed power: 1908-1938: double expansion compound steam engine, 9.5 in (24.1 cm) / 22 in (55.9 cm) by 16 in (40.6 cm), 200 hp (150 kW); 1938-1943: 155 hp (116 kW) diesel engine.
- Propulsion: propeller

Atlanta was a steamboat built in 1908 at Houghton, Washington which served on Lake Washington and Puget Sound until 1938, when it was converted into a diesel-powered houseboat.

== Construction ==
Atlanta, launched May 28, 1908, was the first vessel built at the Houghton shipyard after it had been taken over by Captain John L. Anderson from its former owners, Captains George Bartsch and Harry Tompkins, and renaming it the Anderson Shipyard before it was later renamed to Lake Washington Shipyard. This process had begun in 1906 at the suggest of Jacob Furth, a banker who had also financed the La Conner Trading and Transportation Company.

Atlanta was built entirely of wood. The vessel and was 95 ft (28.96 m) long, 22 ft (6.71 m) beam, and was 87 gross tons and 59 registered tons in overall size. Atlanta was equipped with a double expansion compound steam engine, with cylinder dimensions of 9.5 in (24.1 cm) and 22 in (55.9 cm) with stroke of 16 in (40.6 cm), generating 200 horsepower (150 kW).

Atlanta was registered as steamship number 205232 and was reported to require only two crewmen, at least as of 1909. The vessel cost $30,000 to construct.

== Career ==
Following completion, Atlanta was operated in passenger service on Lake Washington and on the Lake Washington Ship Canal after it was completed in 1916. Anderson, and his firm, the Anderson Steamboat Company faced competition from government-owned and built ferries. Even so, he used his own vessels, the Fortuna and the Atlanta to transport people to Rainier Beach on Lake Washington to witness the launching, on December 5, 1913, of the new King County ferry Leschi.

In 1917 Atlanta was still owned by Anderson Steamship Company.

In the summer of 1922, Atlanta was successfully used as a tourist vessel by Capt. John L. Anderson, making a popular two-hour cruise of Elliott Bay, the Ballard Locks, Lake Union, the Lake Washington Ship Canal, and Lake Washington. By this time, Anderson had sold his interests in his first business, the Anderson Steamboat Company, and was operating Atlanta under the business name of Anderson Water Tours.

== Later years ==
Anderson later sold Atlanta to King County, but leased it back from the county as part of his agreement to operate the county's ferry fleet. In November 1938, Anderson turned Atlanta back to the county, which, having no use for the vessel, sold it at a sheriff's auction for $510 to Russel T. Gibson. He then sold the vessel to Delta V. Smyth, an Olympia lumber mill owner who owned a number tug boats. Smyth removed Atlanta's compound steam engine, and installed it in his tug Olympian. Walter House, who worked for Smyth's company, then installed a 155 horsepower (116 kW) diesel engine in the Atlanta hull, and converted the vessel into a houseboat.

In 1943, the diesel engine that had been placed in Atlanta was removed and installed in the tug Margaret S, which belonged to the American Tug Company, an Everett, Washington concern. Atlanta then became a shoreside house on Lake Union, where it was still in existence as of 1966.
