= 2004 United States Senate election in North Dakota =

- November 2, 2004
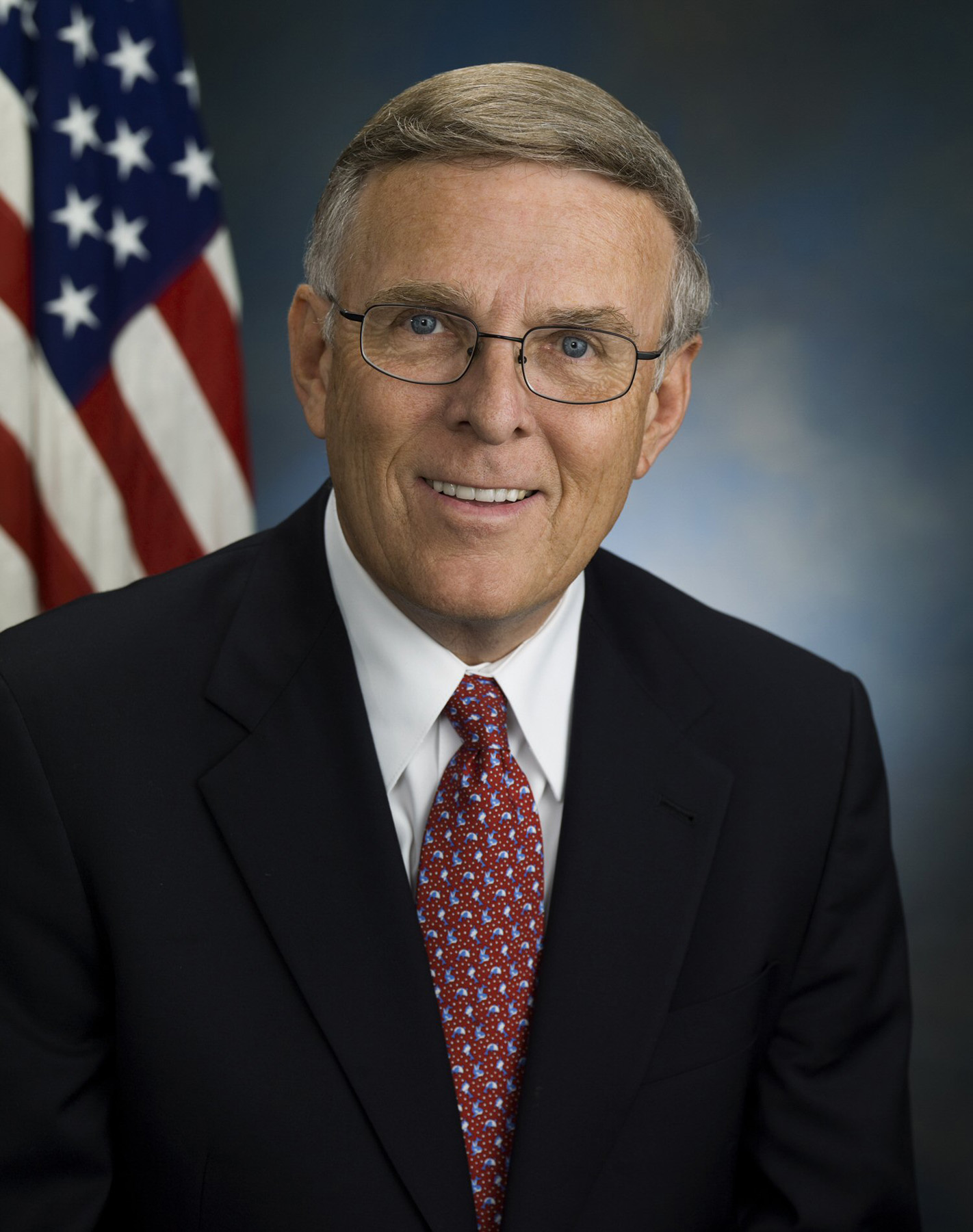

Nominee	Byron Dorgan	Mike Liffrig
Party	Democratic–NPL	Republican
Popular vote	212,143	98,553
Percentage	68.28%	31.72%
- County results Dorgan: 50–60% 60–70% 70–80% 80–90%
U.S. senator before election
Byron Dorgan
Democratic–NPL
Elected U.S. Senator
Byron Dorgan
Democratic–NPL

The 2004 United States Senate election in North Dakota was held on November 2, 2004, concurrent with other elections for president, the United States House of Representatives, and various state and local offices. Incumbent Democratic-NPL U.S. Senator Byron Dorgan won re-election to a third term by a landslide margin of 36.6 percentage points, sweeping every county in the state, even while Democratic presidential nominee John Kerry lost the state by 27.3 percentage points. Despite this landslide victory, as of 2026, this is the last time the Democratic-NPL won the Class 3 Senate seat from North Dakota.

== Candidates ==
=== Democratic-NPL ===
- Byron Dorgan, incumbent U.S. Senator

=== Republican ===
- Mike Liffrig, attorney

== General election ==
=== Predictions ===
Source	Ranking	As of
Sabato's Crystal Ball	Safe D	November 1, 2004

Byron Dorgan (D–NPL)

Newspapers

- The Bismarck Tribune
- The Forum of Fargo–Moorhead
- Grand Forks Herald

=== Results ===
2004 United States Senate election, North Dakota
Party	Candidate	Votes	%
Democratic–NPL	Byron Dorgan (incumbent)	149,936	68.28%
Republican	Mike Liffrig	98,553	31.72%
Total votes		310,696	100.00%
Democratic–NPL hold			

==== Counties that flipped from Republican to Democratic ====
- Sheridan (largest city: McClusky) (previously tied)

== See also ==
- 2004 United States Senate elections
