= Fortuna (steamboat) =

1904 steamboat in United States

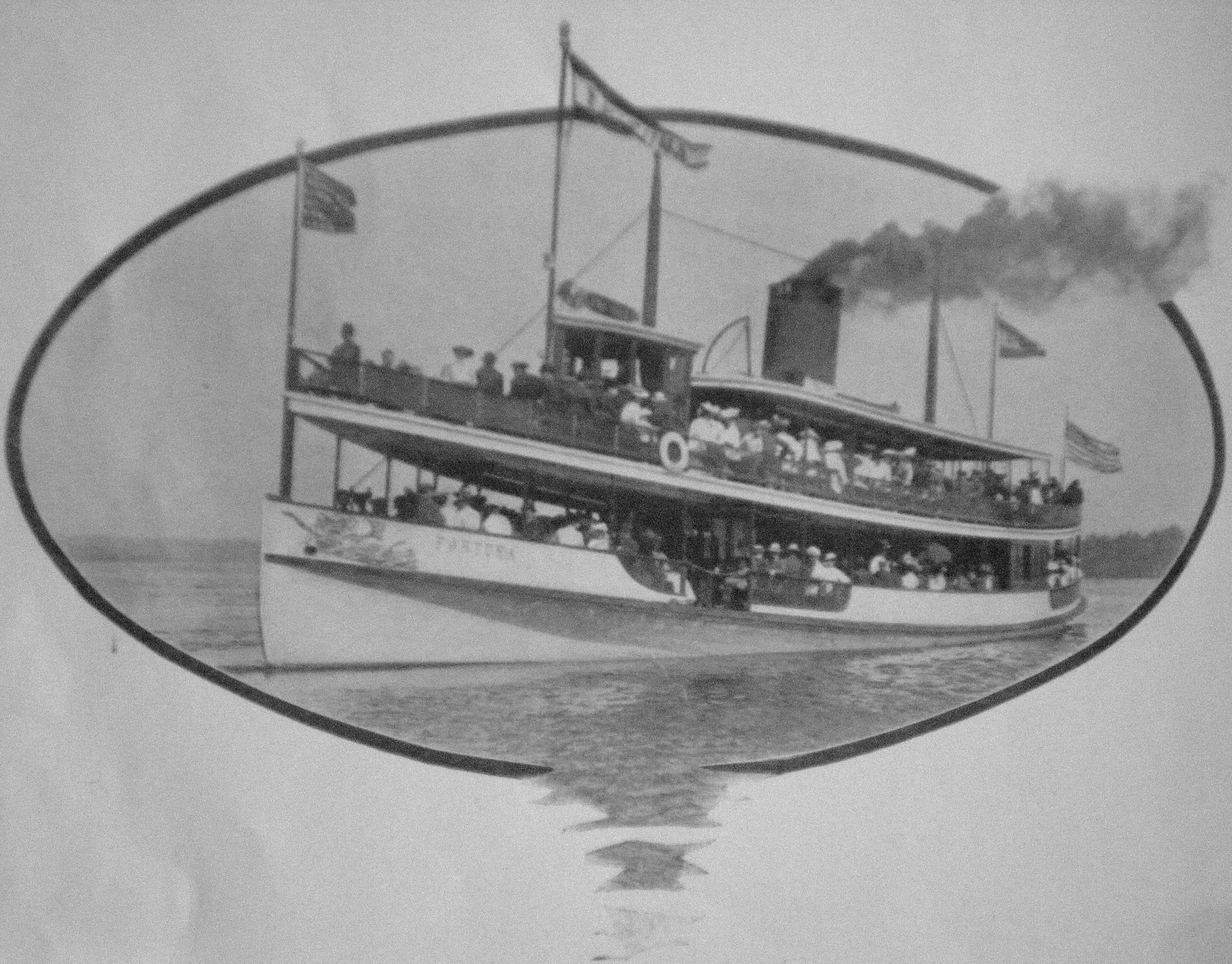
- Fortuna

History
- Name: Fortuna
- Operator: Anderson Steamboat Company
- Launched: March 31, 1906, at Leschi, on Lake Washington

General characteristics
- Type: inland steamship; auto ferry
- Tonnage: 81
- Length: 106.9 ft (32.6 m)
- Installed power: compound steam engine built at Seattle Machine Works
- Notes: Reconstructed as auto ferry in 1919.

The steamboat Fortuna was a vessel that operated on Lake Washington in the first part of the 20th century.

== Construction ==
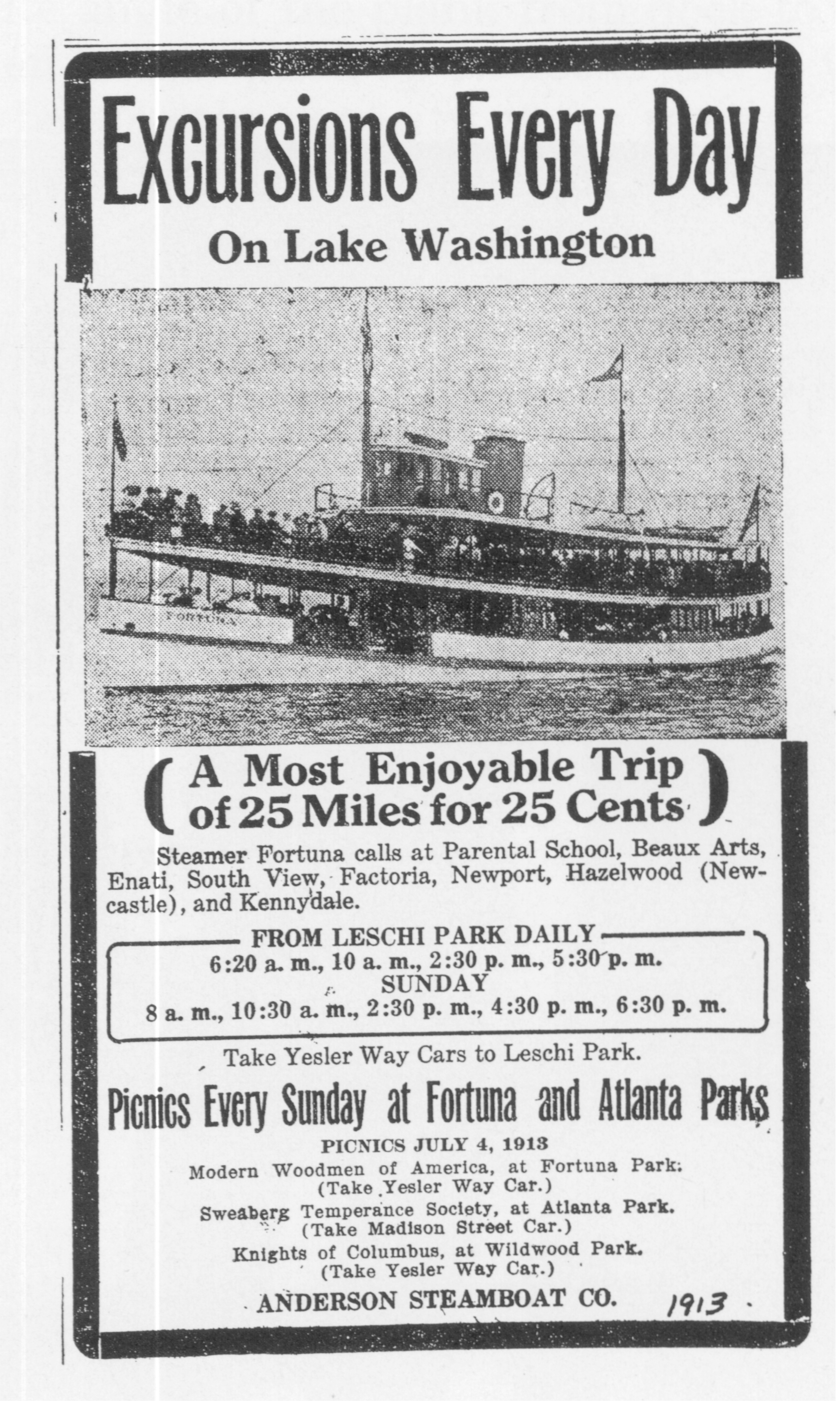
Advertisement for Fortuna, circa 1912.

Fortuna was built in 1904 at a shipyard on the west side of Lake Washington two blocks south of Leschi Park. She was 106.9 feet in length overall, and rated at 81 tons. The vessel is reported to have been acquired by Anderson Steamboat Company at a cost $31,500 in December 1906.

Fortuna was built for Captain John Anderson to join his fleet of steamboats on Lake Washington, operating under the name of the Anderson Steamboat Company. Anderson at that point may have been operating in partnership with the Seattle Street Railway. Fortuna had compound engines that had been built at Seattle Machine Works.

Fortuna was launched on March 31, 1906. She was christened by Miss Daisy Johnson, the 13-year-old daughter of E. E. Johnson, of Seattle Machine Works. A sea wall collapsed under her weight during the launch itself and she was stuck on land. Anderson steamers Cyrene and Xanthus towed her off the beach later that day without incident.

Fortuna was the Roman name for the goddess of fortune. Captain Anderson named his vessels after classical gods, starting with Xanthus and Cyrene.

Fortuna was known for her distinctive chime whistle, which had been personally prepared by Captain Anderson, filing away at the whistle's pipe until the sound suited him. Later the whistle was transferred to another Anderson boat, the Sightseer, which became one of the last steamboats of the Mosquito Fleet to operate on Puget Sound.

== Conversion to ferry ==
Publicly owned ferries (owned by King County on Lake Washington ran Captain Anderson out of the steamboat business by about the time of the First World War, so he sold his interest in the Anderson Steamboat Company. Later, Captain Anderson operated Fortuna and other former vessels of his as a lessee of King County.

In 1919, Fortuna was reconstructed into a ferry at Captain Anderson's shipyard at Houghton. Unlike most purpose-built ferries, Fortuna remained a single-ender. Automobiles however could drive right through the once-beautiful steamer. The procedure was for Fortuna to dock bow-on at Roanoke, on Mercer Island, have autos drive on, then back out and head for the Seattle ferry dock at Leschi. On reaching Leschi, to unload the autos, Fortuna had to be turned and backed into the dock. This took great skill by her captain and engineer. Fortuna was ultimately judged too small for her route, and was returned to the county by Captain Anderson's Lake Washington Ferries company.

== Final disposition ==
On April 30, 1928, King County sold Fortuna at auction. King Shipbuilding Company of Seattle paid $1,150 for her. The leading source states that she lasted until 1938, but is silent as to her later career or ultimate disposition (probably scrapping).

== See also ==
- Steamboats of Lake Washington
- Puget Sound Mosquito Fleet
- Urania (similar but slightly smaller vessel built 1907)
