= Eno Center for Transportation =

American nonprofit organization

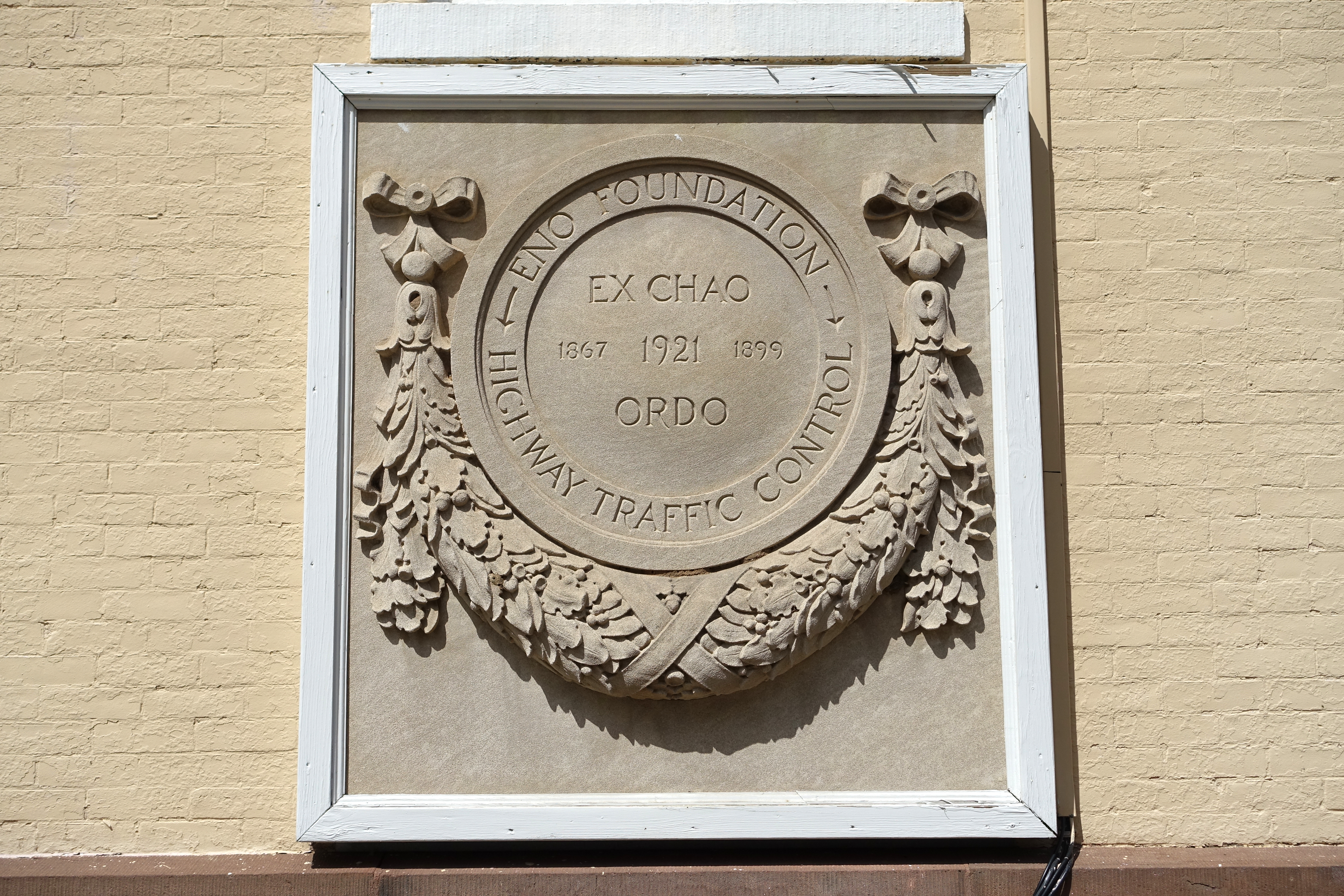
- Abbreviation: Eno
- Formation: April 21, 1921; 105 years ago
- Headquarters: Washington, DC
- Website: www.enotrans.org

The Eno Center for Transportation is a non-profit, independent organization based in Washington, D.C., with the stated mission of shaping public debate on critical multimodal transportation issues and to build an innovative network of transportation professionals. The center was created and endowed in Westport, Connecticut, by William Phelps Eno, a pioneer in the field of traffic control.

== History ==
In 1921, William P. Eno created a corporation to promote safety on roads and highways. He started the Eno Foundation for Highway Traffic Regulation and began attracting other industry experts to discuss improving the movement of people and goods.

On April 21, 1921, Eno published the foundation's articles of association. These articles laid out the purposes of the foundation:

1. Devise traffic methods and rules
2. Publish information on traffic
3. Standardize general highway traffic regulations
4. Familiarize the public with traffic laws
5. Promote special traffic regulations
6. Provide proper instruction of traffic police
7. Promote proper understanding by all police that they have general traffic obligations when in uniform
8. Furnish advice on traffic regulation generally
9. Recommend physical changes, such as widening of roadbeds, to assist the movement of traffic

== Boards ==
=== Board of directors ===
The Eno Center for Transportation's Board of Directors is made up of distinguished leaders from across the transportation field. Board Members bring expertise in all modes of transportation and experience in federal and state government service, as well as the private sector. The Board meets throughout the year to provide strategic direction and assure careful stewardship of resources. Board Members also participate in Eno activities, such as policy forums and leadership development programs.

- James Burnley: Chairman of the Board; former U.S. Secretary of Transportation
- Norman Mineta: Principal, Mineta & Associates; former U.S. Secretary of Transportation Emeritus
- Mary Peters: Principal, Mary Peters Consulting; former U.S. Secretary of Transportation
- Thomas F. Prendergast: Head of Transit, AECOM; former chairman and CEO of the Metropolitan Transportation Authority in New York
- Marjorie J. Dickman: Chief Government Affairs and Public Policy Officer, Blackberry
- Carolyn Flowers: Managing Principal, InfraStrategies LLC; former Acting Administrator of the Federal Transit Administration.
- Keith Parker: President and CEO, Goodwill of North Georgia; former General Manager and CEO, Metropolitan Atlanta Rapid Transit Authority (MARTA)
- Martin T. Whitmer; Principal, Whitmer & Worrall
- Diane Woodend Jones; chairman of the board, Lea+Elliott, Inc.; former chair, WTS international
- Tay Yoshitani; Port of Seattle (retired)
- Karen Rae; Senior Strategic Advisor at STV Inc.; former deputy administrator at the Federal Railroad Administration.

=== Board of advisors ===
The Eno board of advisors provides advice and counsel to Eno's executive leadership, including its board of directors and president and chief executive officer. The members are selected from across industry and government, and possess extensive knowledge and expertise in surface-, air-, and water-based transportation policy, management, and operations. The board meets annually with the board of directors to provide advice on organizational priorities and participate in policy and professional development activities.

- Jennifer Aument: Group General Manager, North America Transurban
- Doran Barnes: Executive Director, Foothill Transit
- Shailen Bhatt: President and CEO, Intelligent Transportation Society of America (ITS America)
- Emily Feenstra: Managing Director of Government Relations and Infrastructure Initiatives, American Society of Civil Engineers
- Kate Fox Wood: Director, Government Relations, Association of Equipment Manufacturers
- Patricia G. Hendren: Executive Director, Eastern Transportation Coalition
- Kara Kockelman: E.P. Schoch Professor in Engineering, University of Texas at Austin
- Hani Mahmassani: Director, Northwestern University Transportation Center
- Ed Mortimer: Executive Director, Transportation and Infrastructure, U.S. Chamber of Commerce
- A. Bradley Mims: President & CEO, Conference of Minority Transportation Officials
- Thomas O'Brien: Executive Director, Center for International Trade and Transportation, California State University, Long Beach
- Joel Oppenheimer: Senior Vice President, STV Inc.
- Christopher Pangilinan: Head of Global Policy for Public Transportation, Uber
- Neil Pedersen: Executive Director, Transportation Research Board
- Sharon Pinkerton: Senior Vice President, Legislative and Regulatory Policy, Airlines for America
- Paul Rinaldi: President, National Air Traffic Controllers Association
- David Somo: Senior Vice President, Corporate Strategy, Marketing & Solutions Engineering, ON Semiconductor
- Paul Skoutelas: President and CEO, American Public Transportation Association
- Michael Smythers: Vice President of Federal Government Affairs, BNSF Railway
- H. A. "Burt" Tasaico: Director of Strategic Initiatives and Program Support, North Carolina Department of Transportation
- Adie Tomer: Senior Fellow, Brookings Institution Metropolitan Policy Program
- Jannet Walker Ford: Senior Vice President, Transportation Strategy, Growth & Key Accounts for Americas AECOM
- Maggie Walsh: Vice President and Strategic Pursuits Leader for the Transportation Business Group, HDR, Inc.
- Linda Washington: President and CEO, The Washington Consulting Team
- Nicole Young: Vice President Commercial Aviation & Transportation Government Operations, The Boeing Company
- Seth Young: Director, Ohio State University Center for Aviation Studies

=== Board of Regents ===
The Board of Regents supports Eno's educational and professional development programs. Members are selected from across the public and private sectors and share Eno's commitment to creative and visionary leadership in the transportation sector. They select the LDC Fellows, offer advice to improve the value of Eno's professional development programs, help identify needs in workforce development, and serve as ambassadors to help build relationships across Eno's alumni network.

- Asha Weinstein Agrawal: Director, Mineta Transportation Institute (MTI) National Transportation Finance Center
- Rhonda Allen: Chief Customer Experience Officer, Metropolitan Atlanta Rapid Transit Authority (MARTA)
- Anthony Barnes: Chief Operating Officer, Airport Minority Advisory Council
- Jonathan Church: Project Manager, McMahon Associates
- Jennifer Dill: Director of the Transportation Research and Education Center (TREC), Portland State University
- Michael Meyer: Consultant
- Jennifer Mitchell: Director, Virginia Department of Rail and Public Transportation
- Steven Polunsky: Director of the Transportation Policy Research Center, University of Alabama
- Billy Terry: Director, National Transit Institute (NTI)
- Melissa S. Tooley: Director of External Initiatives, Texas A&M Transportation Institute
