= Aquilo (steam yacht) =

1901 steam yacht in United States

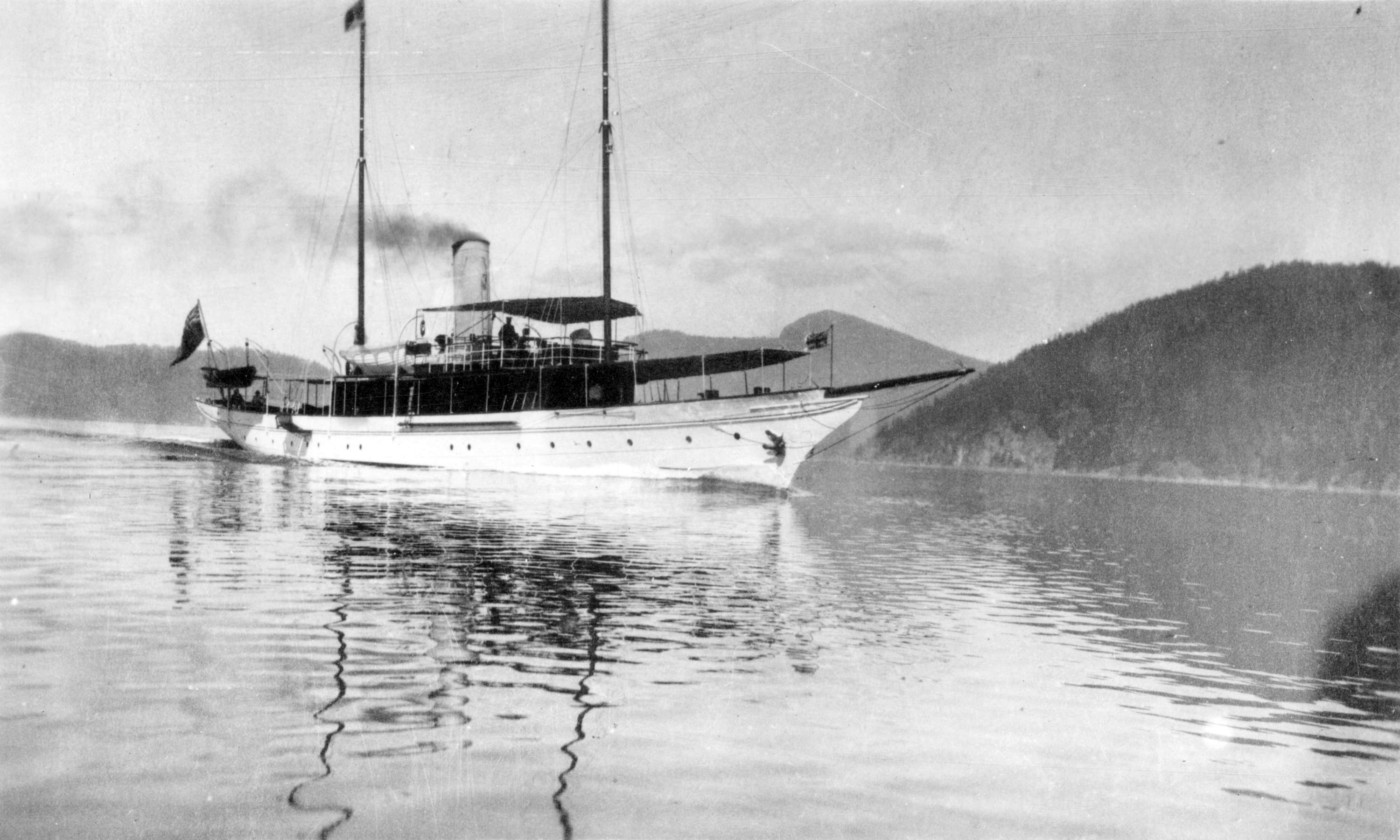
- Aquilo circa 1912 in Vancouver harbor

History
- Name: Aquilo
- Owner: William Phelps Eno and others
- Builder: George Lawley & Son
- Cost: $120,000
- Yard number: 461
- Completed: 1901
- Out of service: September 1966
- Identification: U.S. Registry #107697; Canada #130842
- Fate: Caught fire at sea and sank.

General characteristics
- Type: Steam yacht.
- Tonnage: 176 gross; 103 net
- Length: 152.6 ft (46.51 m) over all;127.4 ft (38.83 m) registered; 125.5 ft (38.25 m) waterline length
- Beam: 20 ft (6.10 m)
- Draft: 9.3 ft (2.83 m)
- Depth: 11.3 ft (3.44 m) depth of hold.
- Installed power: compound steam engine, coal (later oil) fired boilers, three-cylinder triple expansion; cylinder bores 10.75 in (27.3 cm), 17 in (43.2 cm) and 27 in (68.6 cm); stroke 18 in (45.7 cm).
- Propulsion: Propeller
- Sail plan: schooner (auxiliary rig)
- Speed: 12 to 14 knots in 1910
- Crew: fifteen (15) in 1910

Aquilo was a steam yacht which was built in Boston in 1901 for William Phelps Eno, a wealthy man who was the inventor of the stop sign. In 1910, Eno sold Aquilo and the yacht was brought to the west coast of North America, where it was operated principally in Puget Sound and coastal British Columbia. Aquilo had a long succession of wealthy owners. In 1966, the yacht caught fire and sank while en route from Seattle to Los Angeles.

== Construction and design ==
Aquilo (U.S. registry #107697) was constructed in Boston, Massachusetts, by the firm of George Lawley & Son. The initial owner was William Phelps Eno (1858–1945), the inventor of the stop sign. Eno was a member of the exclusive New York Yacht Club. The signal code for the yacht was KRGB.

The ship was built as hull number 461 in the Lawley yard, which at that time was adjacent to the Boston Yacht Club. The designer was Tams, Lemoine & Crane.

The overall size of the yacht was 176 gross and 103 registered tons. The registered length of the vessel was 127.4 feet, with the length overall of 152.6 feet, and length on the load water line of 125.5 feet. The beam was 20 feet, and the depth of hold was 11.3 feet. The draft of the vessel was 9.3 feet.

The hull was built of steel with a flush deck. The deckhouses were built of teak.

There were four rooms in the after section of the yacht reserved for the use of the owner, as well as two bathrooms and two toilet rooms. There were two double and two single staterooms for the use of the crew. The dining room was in the deck-house, and there was a continuous deck house passage on the starboard side from the smoking room aft to the dining room forward.

The power plant consisted of a single Lawler triple-expansion steam engine, with cylinder diameters of 10.75, 17 and 27 inches, and a bore stroke of 18 inches. Steam was generated by two Almy-type boilers, which could drive the vessel at a speed of 12 to 14 knots. Coal consumption was four tons per day. Aquilo had an auxiliary sailing rig as a schooner. The yacht was equipped with electric lighting and the interior had steam heat. Auxiliary vessels in 1910 consisted of two rowboats and a naphtha launch. In 1910 Aquilo carried a crew of fifteen men, which required a monthly payroll of $850., that is, $10,000 per year.

== History ==
On May 2, 1902, The New York Times reported that William P. Eno, of New York, the owner of Aquilo had departed the previous Saturday on Aquilo with a large party of guests, bound for Martinique and St. Vincent to observe the volcanic eruptions then occurring on those islands. Discussions at the New York Yacht Club at that time indicated that other yachts might be making similar cruises.

In 1910, the yacht was sold to Herbert E. Law, a resident of San Francisco, California, and subsequently taken from Boston around South America to the west coast of the United States. On January 1, 1910, it was announced that William P. Eno had sold Aquilo to Herbert E. Law, of San Francisco, and James H. Moore, of Seattle. Law and Moore had recently acquired steel interests all along the west coast of the United States. These were formed into a company called "Western Steel", which held extensive ore deposits in the Puget Sound region. The purpose of the yacht was announced as being to call upon the various places where the concerns of Law and Moore were located. Western Steel was based in Irondale, Washington.

Law was described, in 1910, as being "well known in yachting circles on the Pacific coast.". He had been elected commodore of the Pacific Yacht Club in 1897, and his yacht Sappho had been the flagship of that yacht club for two years until Law sold it to buy a bigger vessel.

Having completed recent dry dock maintenance, Aquilo left New York City on December 23, 1909, bound for San Francisco. The trip was a journey of 17,000 miles, and was said to involve a transit of the Straits of Magellan. Aquilo arrived in San Francisco on March 28, 1910.

In 1912, Aquilo was sold to Benjamin Tingley Rogers (1865–1918), president of the British Columbia Sugar Refining Company of Vancouver, British Columbia. Upon the outbreak of World War I, in 1914, Aquilo was armed and performed duties as a naval patrol vessel off Cape Flattery. The yacht was assigned Canadian registry number 130842. By 1917, Aquilo had been converted to oil fuel.

In 1920, Aquilo was reported to be owned by H.F. Alexander, president of the Pacific Steamship Company, through whom the vessel was associated with the Tacoma Yacht Club. In 1934, H.F. Alexander and the estate of James B. Hoge, a Seattle capitalist, sold Aquilo to John W. Eddy, of the Skinner and Eddy shipbuilding concern.

In 1944 John W. Eddy sold Aquilo to Edward D. White, owner of the Lakewood Boat Company and Harbor Island Ferries. White intended to use Aquilo as a charter vessel. By the 1950s, the only steam yachts still operational on Puget Sound were Aquilo and El Primero.

== Last years ==
In 1962, Aquilo, then docked in Seattle, was purchased by John Campbell (d.1999), an eccentric but multi-talented inventor and professor from California. Campbell moved to Seattle, where he lived on Aquilo, trying to restore the vessel while working as a professor at the University of Washington. Campbell's plan was to convert the vessel into a sea-going engineering campus. Another plan that Campbell had was to collect advertising revenue by erecting huge billboards on the yacht and cruising along California beaches between Santa Monica and Redondo Beach.

== Fire and sinking ==
On September 5, 1966, while en route from Seattle to Los Angeles, with Campbell and three other persons on board, Aquilo caught fire and sank. All aboard were rescued by the intervention of a U.S. Coast Guard cutter, Point Ledge, which responded to an SOS signal broadcast from the yacht. The sinking occurred about two miles off the California coast, near Fort Bragg, California.

In the weeks prior to the sinking, the Coast Guard had had to assist Aquilo on three occasions, specifically on August 25, 1966, when the vessel was taking on water while in drydock in Seattle on Lake Union, on September 4, 1966, when the vessel reported itself to be disabled at sea 10 miles west of the mouth of the Rogue River at Gold Beach, Oregon, and, on the same day, the Aquilo having been restored to operability, when the Coast Guard was asked to escort the Aquilo into the northern California port of Crescent City, because the crew did not have sufficient knowledge of the waters of that area.

== See also ==
- El Primero
- Lotus (motor vessel)
