= Cyrene (steamboat) =

- Cyrene

History
- Name: Cyrene
- Owner: James M. Colman, John L. Anderson
- Route: Lake Washington, Puget Sound
- Builder: Matt Anderson
- In service: 1891
- Notes: Originally built as a yacht. Rebuilt in 1909 to increase capacity (pilot house moved to upper deck).

General characteristics
- Type: inland steamboat
- Displacement: 21 gross tons, 15 net tons
- Length: 61 feet (19 m)
- Beam: 10 feet (3.0 m)
- Draft: 5.3 feet (1.6 m)
- Propulsion: propeller
- Crew: 6 (captain, mate, deckhand, engineer, purser, fireman)
- Notes: Official number 126774

Cyrene was a steamboat that operated initially on Puget Sound and later on Lake Washington from 1891 to 1914. Cyrene and another similar vessel Xanthus were somewhat unusual in that they had clipper bows and were both originally built as yachts.

== Construction and launching ==
Cyrene was built in Seattle in a boatyard on the site of Colman Dock. The vessel was commissioned as a yacht by James M. Colman, a prominent early Seattle businessman. Colman hoped that the building of the yacht would encourage employment in the shipyard. Matt Anderson superintended the construction of the vessel. She was launched in 1891 and passed her final inspection at the end of July that year.

As originally built, Cyrene was 61 feet (19 m) long, 10 feet (3.0 m) in beam, and had a draft of 5.3 feet (1.6 m). She displaced 21 gross tons. She was substantially enlarged in 1904 in order to carry more passengers at a cost of $4,000. The work was done at Atwood's wharf near Leschi Park. After this rebuild, she displaced 25 gross tons. She was lengthened to 94 feet (29 m) and had her beam increased to 11.6 feet (3.5 m). Her pilothouse was moved to the upper deck in order to create more room for passengers on the lower deck.

Cyrene's original engine was removed and installed on Inland Flyer in late 1900. Seattle Machine Works built a new compound steam engine for Cyrene in 1901, and it was installed at least by April of that year.

At least as early as 1901, she had electric lights aboard for nighttime operation.

== Service as a yacht (1891–1900) ==
Immediately after her final inspection, on August 2, 1891, Cyrene headed north to East Sound on Orcas Island. She was base camp for a two-week camping expedition for 42 vacationers. Guests enjoyed tennis, bonfires, singing, and stories. This camping expedition became an almost annual affair. The Colman family used her as a setting for dinner parties for their friends. There were excursions to Port Orchard, Tacoma, Alki Point, Olympia, among others. Laurence J. Colman, James' son, took his Sunday school class on an outing.

== Lake Washington passenger ferry (1900–1914) ==
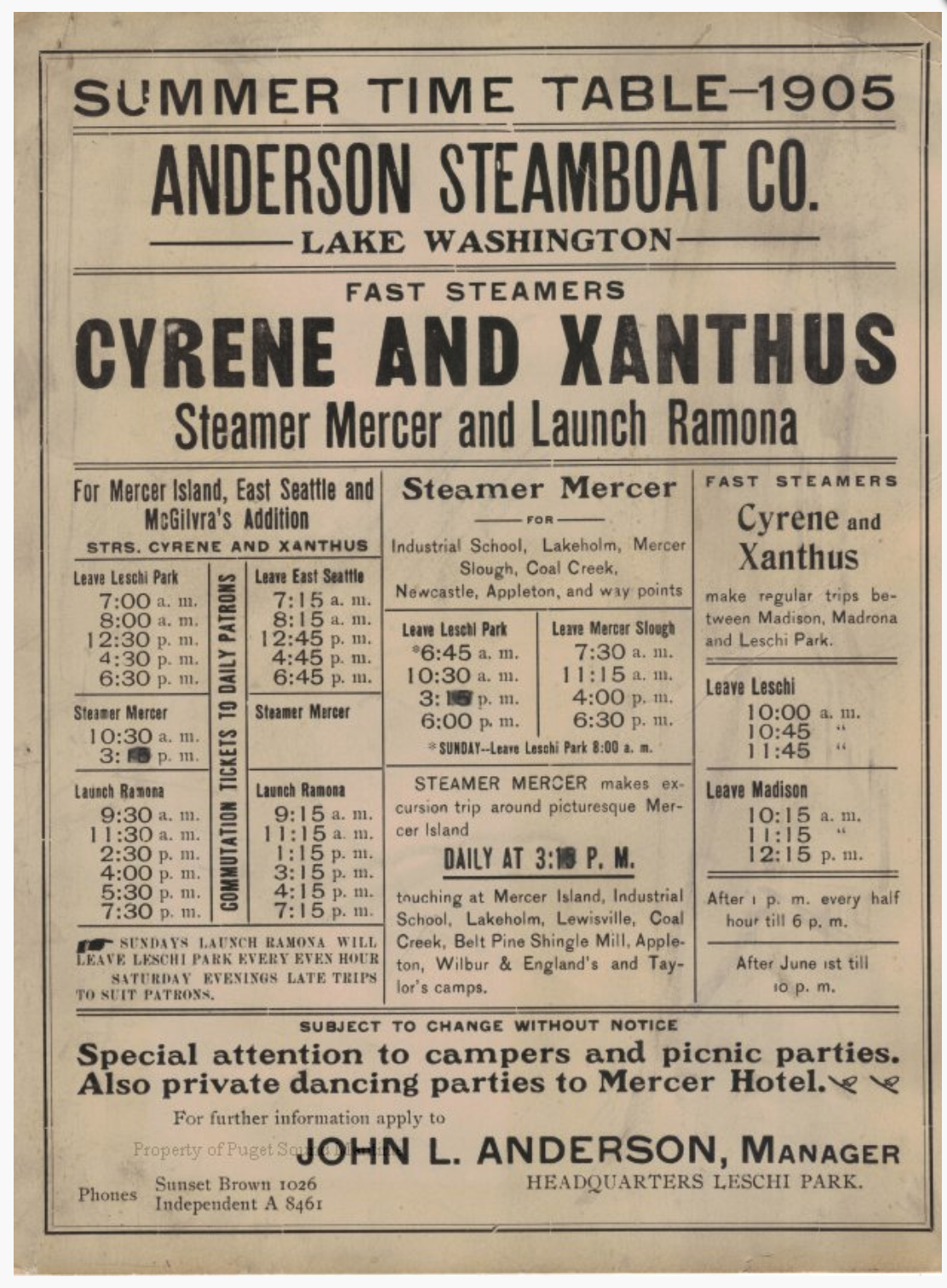
Anderson Steamboat Company advertising Cyrene in 1905

John L. Anderson purchased Cyrene from Colman in March 1900. The two of them had been partners in Winnifred, in the early 1890s. Anderson sailed the vessel to Lake Washington by way of the difficult Black River route, the only natural riverine access from Puget Sound to Lake Washington.

Starting in the summer of 1900, Anderson ran the vessel as a passenger ferry between Madison Park and Leschi Park. In 1903, Anderson acquired Xanthus, another of James Coleman's yachts. He paired her with Cyrene to create a passenger ferry service that ran every half hour between Leschi Park, Madrona Park, and Madison Park. The fare was 10 cents. Business was good. Too good on occasion. In 1907 Cyrene was fined $393.50 for taking 30 more passengers than the law allowed. In 1914 Cyrene ran from Leschi Park to various points on the west side of Mercer Island eleven times daily.

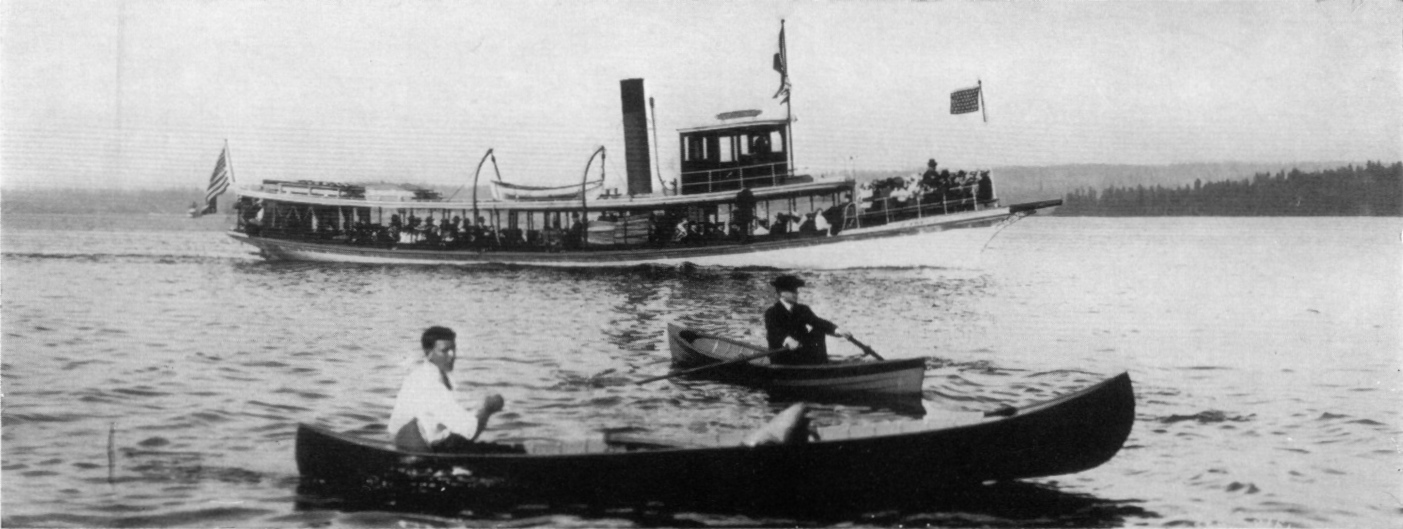
Cyrene on Lake Washington, 1905

In addition to her ferry service, Cyrene was chartered for private cruises. For example, on July 31, 1900 the Seattle Chamber of Commerce entertained the officers of the 1st Cavalry, then encamped at Fort Lawton, on a lake cruise and dinner. Cyrene hosted wedding parties, the Norse Club of Seattle, college fraternities, and many other private events. On May 23, 1901 she hosted thirteen members of Congress from Ohio, on their way home from San Francisco where they had viewed the launch of the battleship Ohio.

== End of Cyrene ==
There is no advertising or other press account of Cyrene sailing after 1914, but neither is there any report of her being sold or broken up. She drops from Federal registration in 1915 so it seems likely that she was broken up. Wreck divers in Lake Washington have identified a hull that conforms to the general size and shape of Cyrene, but the ship cannot be definitively identified.
