= West Seattle Land and Improvement Company =

US company

West Seattle Land & Improv. Co.
- West Seattle ferry terminal and waterfront, c. 1913
- Type: Land development with ancillary ferry service
- Founded: 1888
- Headquarters: West Seattle
- Area served: West Seattle; Routes: Elliott Bay; Terminals: Seattle waterfront (east), West Seattle (west) Rail links: Cable car at west terminal.
- Services: Shipping company Ships owned City of Seattle, West Seattle
- Total assets: $2.1 million initial (including subsidiaries)
- Subsidiaries: Oreg. & Wash. Ferry & Nav. Co. West Seattle Cable Rwy Co. West Seattle Elec. Lt. & Wtr Co.
- Competitors: Lady of the Lake

The West Seattle Land and Improvement Company was a real estate development concern that conducted business in West Seattle starting in 1888. Through a subsidiary, the Oregon and Washington Ferry and Navigation Company, the company also owned and operated two ferries that operated between the company's developments in West Seattle and Seattle itself, which was then a separate city which was difficult to reach over land routes of the time.

== Formation ==
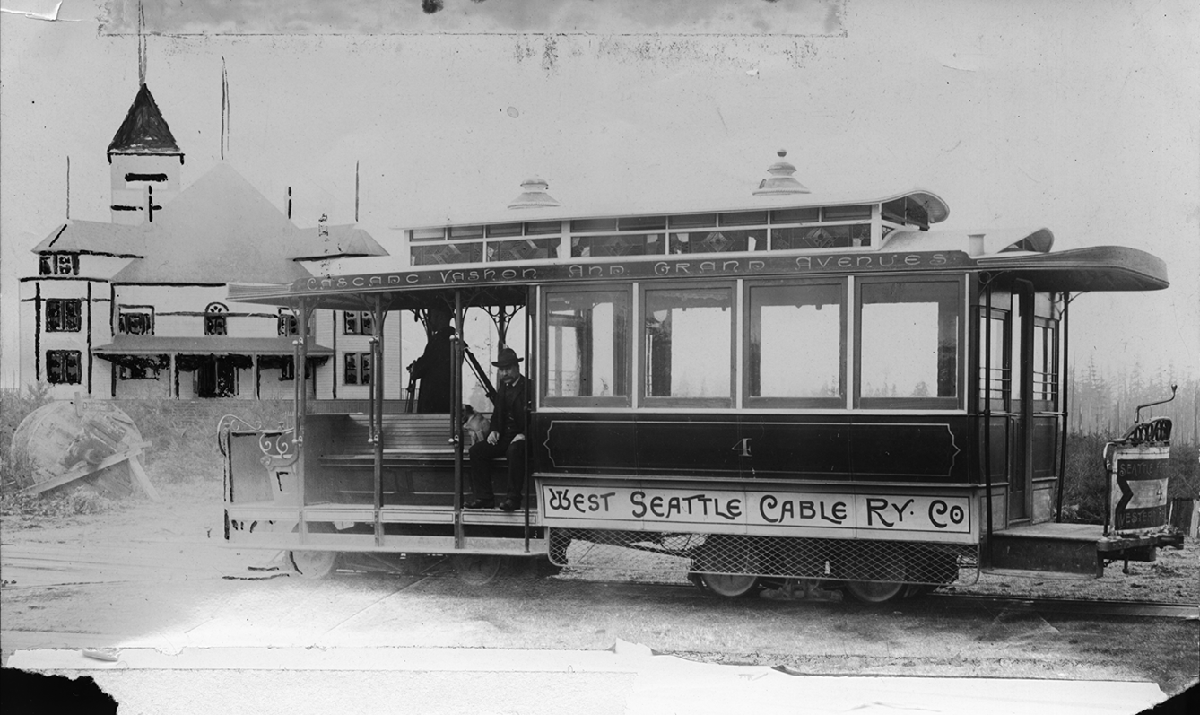
West Seattle Cable Railway Co car, pictured in 1895.

The West Seattle Land & Improvement Company was incorporated July 11, 1888, and was reported to have been capitalized at $1,500,000. Most of the capital came from San Francisco. Thomas Ewing was the president and Morris S. Bates was secretary and general manager.

Several subsidiaries or affiliated companies were later organized, all with Ewing as president and Bates as secretary. These included West Seattle Cable Railway Co, incorporated February 26, 1890, capitalized at $500,000, and West Seattle Electric Light & Water Co. incorporated February 25, 1890, and capitalized at $100,000.

In 1890, the company's main office was in West Seattle, at the corner of Railroad and Grand streets. The company had a branch office in Seattle, at the foot of Marion Street. The company's ferry ticket agent was Arthur I. Gould.

== Course of business ==
The company purchased and replatted much of what later became the Admiral district. To attract potential buyers, the company organized a ferry service, constructing a terminal and purchasing a ferry, the City of Seattle In September 1890, the company also built a two-mile long cable railway, leading from the ferry dock to the top of the high ground where the company's real estate development was underway. The company had $300,000 worth of real estate sales in 1890, but was hit hard by the Panic of 1893. The cable line closed in 1897. The company's ferry operation continued without the cableway. In 1900 the company held a mail contract for the ferry route, which paid $250 per year.

== Rate war ==
In 1903, the company's ferry division was involved in a rate war on the ferry route against the steamer Lady of the Lake There were two collisions between City of Seattle and Lady of the Lake during the rate war. The owners of Lady of the Lake reduced their fares to five cents, which prompted the ferry division to allow 40 rides for one dollar. The rate war ended on June 18, 1903, when Lady of the Lake was hauled out of the water in a shipyard in West Seattle. Overnight a fire broke out. The origin of the fire was reported to be "not ascertained", with Lady of the Lake suffering approximately $3000 in damage. The rate war and the circumstances of the fire caused a rumor that arson was the cause, but no charges were ever brought.

== Litigation ==
The company was involved in a number of lawsuits over the years. These included among others West Seattle Land & Improv. Co. v. Herron, 48 Pac. Rep. 341 (Wash. 1897); West Seattle Land & Improv. Co. v. Novelty Mill Co., 72 Pac. Rep. 69 (Wash. 1903), and Town of West Seattle v. West Seattle Land and Improvement Co., 80 Pac. 549.

== Peak ferry year and decline ==
In 1907 City of Seattle was still on the same route, but demand had increased so much that a new and larger vessel was commissioned to handle the ferry traffic. This was the West Seattle, which was built at Tacoma and entered regular service on June 27, 1907 on the Seattle – West Seattle route. The company had its own ferry terminal in Seattle.

With the new ferry on the route, City of Seattle was then shifted to run to the Luna amusement park then located at Duwamish Head. 1907 was the peak year for ferry transport on the Seattle-West Seattle run, with 103,000 passengers carried in July alone. After that, rising competition from the expanding network of street car lines over time proved too much for the West Seattle ferries, and City of Seattle was taken off the route in 1911. West Seattle was kept on the run, and in June 1913, the money-losing ferry was sold to the Port of Seattle.

== Property ownership ==
In 1910, almost the entire waterfront of West Seattle, which by then had become part of the municipality of Seattle, was owned by the West Seattle Land & Improvement Co., and occupied by tenants on short-term leases.
