= North Admiral, Seattle =

Neighborhood in Seattle, Washington

North Admiral
- Seattle Neighborhood
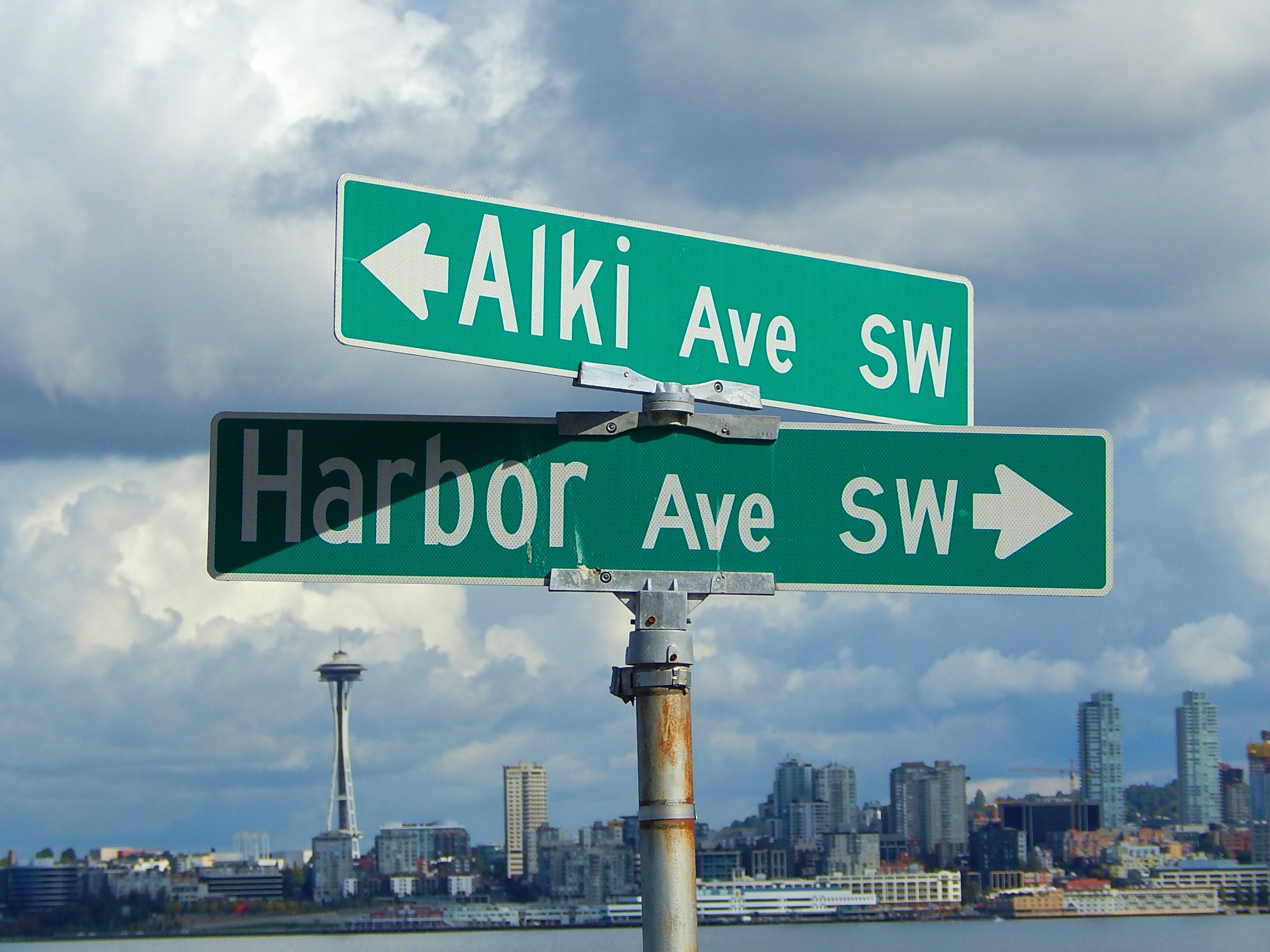
- Downtown Seattle as seen from West Seattle

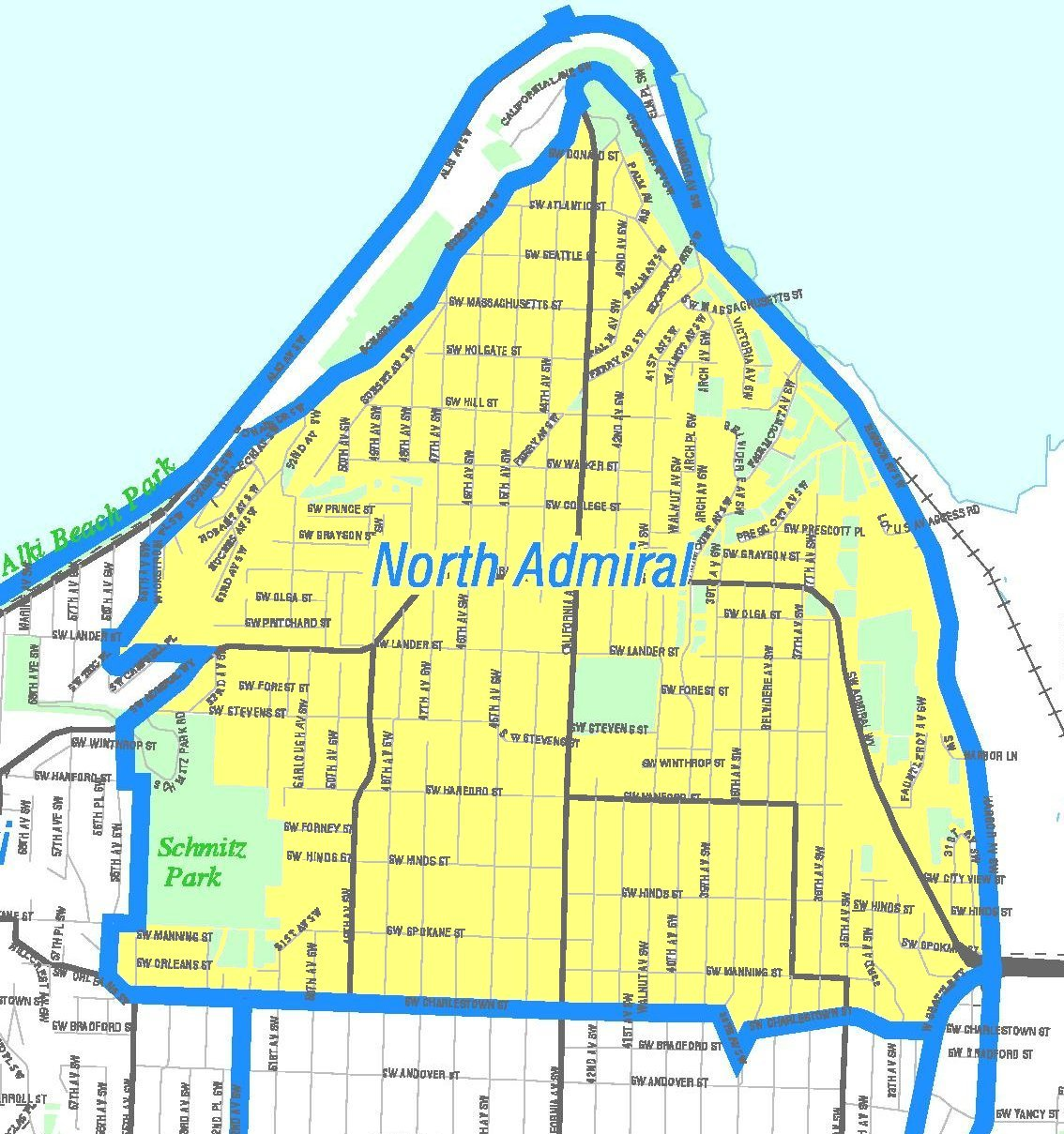
- Map of West Seattle's location in Seattle
- Coordinates: 47.5855°N 122.3847°W

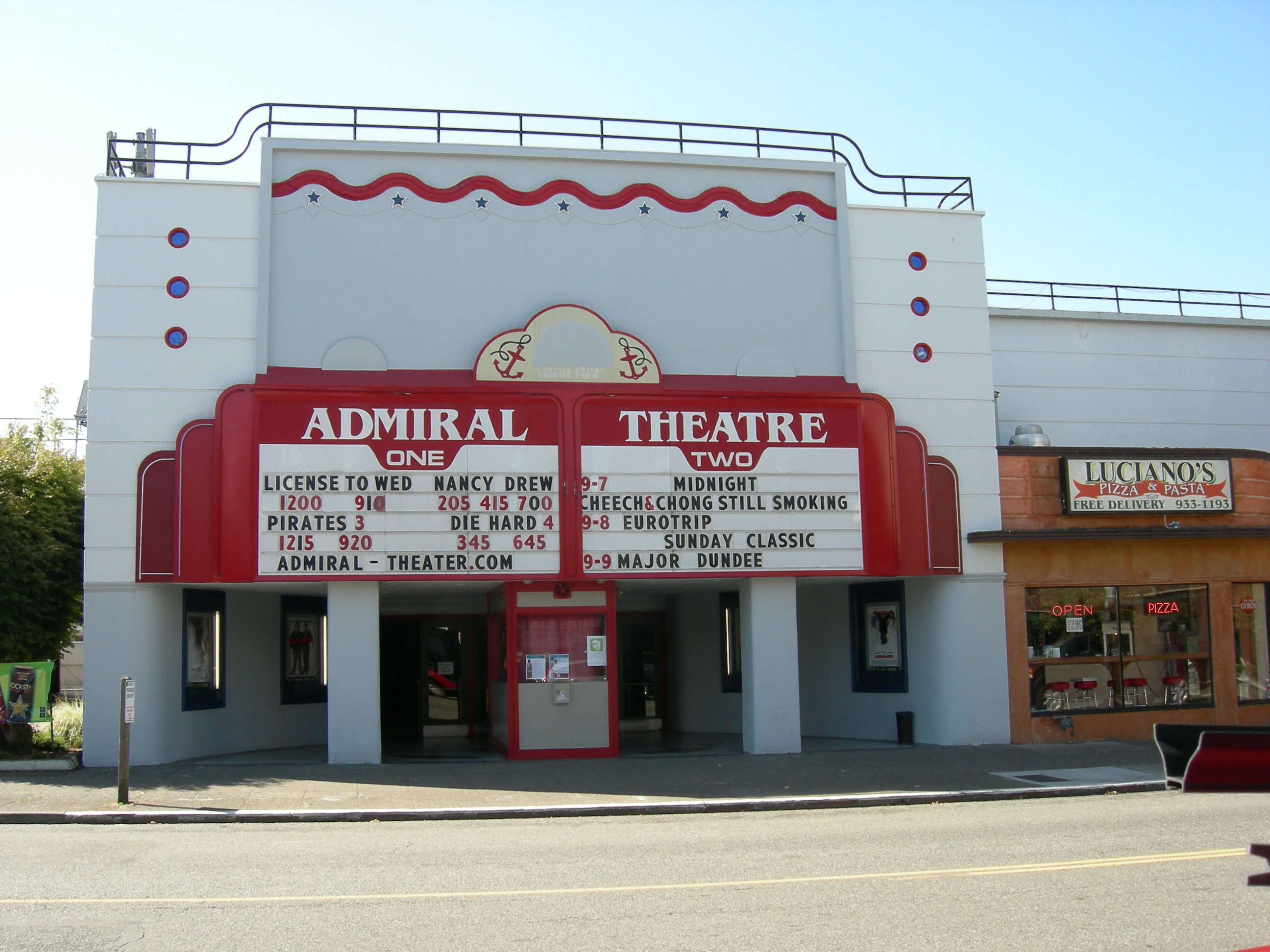
The nautically themed Admiral Theatre in North Admiral is on the National Register of Historic Places.

North Admiral (locally known as Admiral or Admiral District) is the oldest neighborhood in West Seattle, Washington. In the early 1900s, it was connected to Seattle by ferries and a cable car. These ferries included the paddle steamers City of Seattle and West Seattle.

The North Admiral district is the location of West Seattle High School, which is adjacent to Hiawatha Playfield, which is home to the oldest community center west of the Mississippi. North Admiral is also home to Schmitz Preserve Park, 53.1 acres of old-growth forest traversed by 1.7 miles of hiking trails. The neighborhood name implies that it is at the north end of Admiral Way S.W.; however, Admiral Way runs east and west and crosses California Avenue S.W. north of the major junction at S.W. Alaska Street and California. Thus the name North Admiral combines the orientation to The Junction with the name of the main cross street.

The population of the area is approximately 22,241, based on the estimates of the U.S. Census.
