= Heffernan Engine Works =

Former shipyard in Seattle, Washington

- Incorporated: 17 July 1903
- Founded: 1899
- Founders: John T. Heffernan
- Headquarters: Seattle, Washington

Heffernan Engine Works and its sister company, Heffernan Dry Dock Company, was a prominent ship repair and construction business in Seattle, Washington during the first quarter of the twentieth century. The business operated two major shipyards at various times and worked on hundreds of ships.

== Organizational history ==
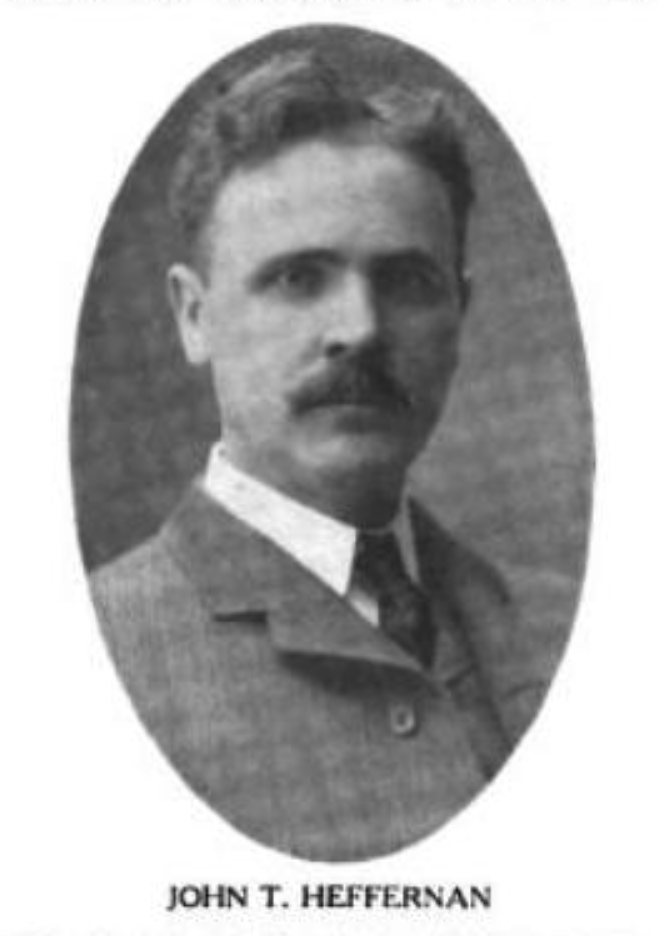
John T. Heffernan, circa 1909

=== Heffernan Engine Works (1899–1925) ===
As early as 1892, John T. Heffernan had a small marine repair and construction business in Port Townsend, Washington called Puget Sound Engineering Works. This business built USRC Scout and USRC Guard, both of which were launched in 1896, and the original steam engine for the tug Prosper. In 1899, at 33 years old, Heffernan moved to Seattle and established a similar marine repair and construction business, Heffernan Engine Works. His machine shop was located at 108 Railroad Avenue. The original wood-frame structure was replaced by a brick building in 1918 which still stands at what is now 110 Alaskan Way in the Pioneer Square area.

The company's products included marine steam engines, pumps, boilers, windlasses, winches, and related installation and repair services. Heffernan Engine Works began as a sole proprietorship. It became a Washington State corporation on 17 July 1903 with a capitalization of $50,000.

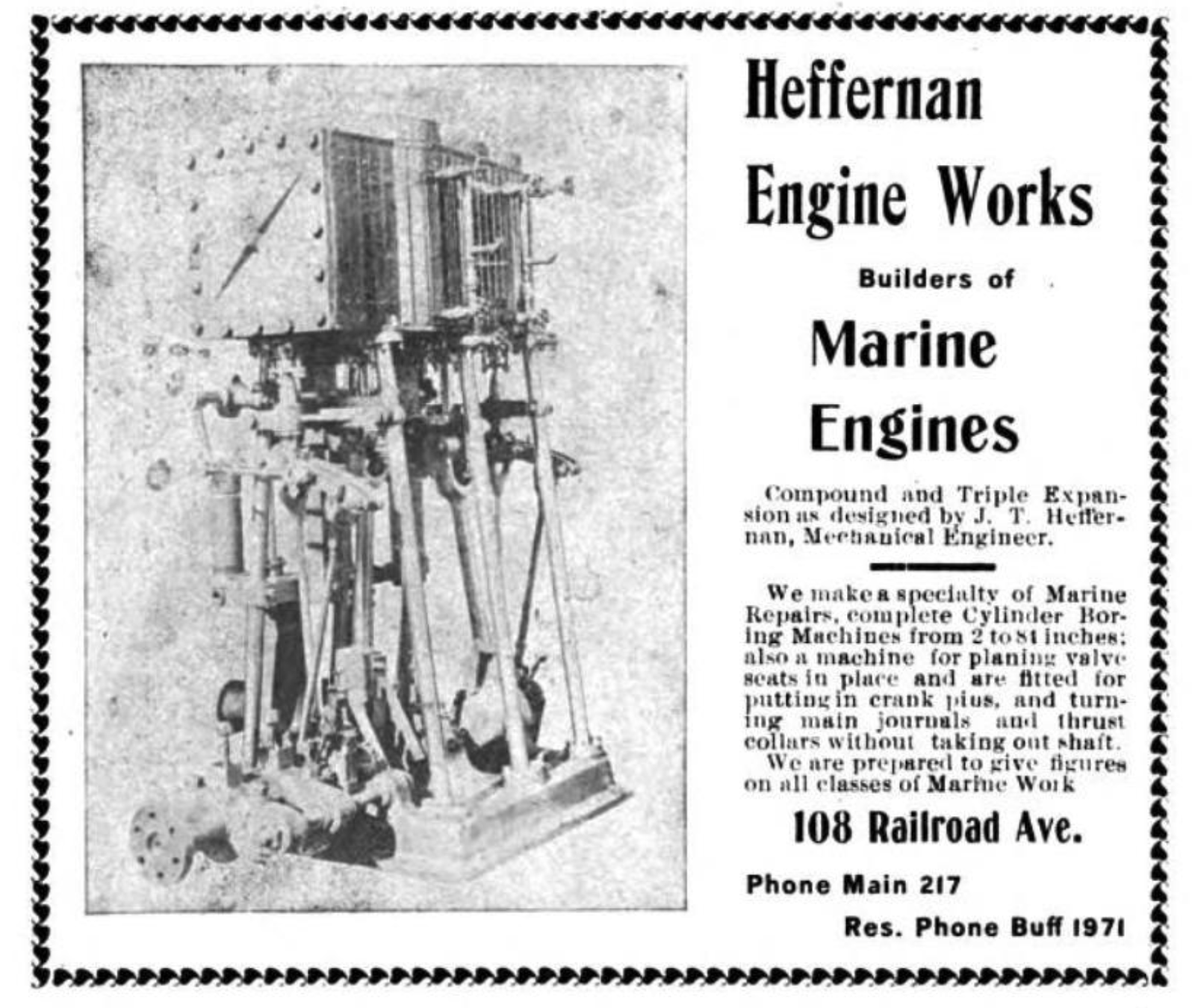
1899 advertisement for Heffernan Engine Works

Heffernan Engine Works remained in continuous operation through at least 1927.

=== East Waterway shipyard (1904–1913) ===
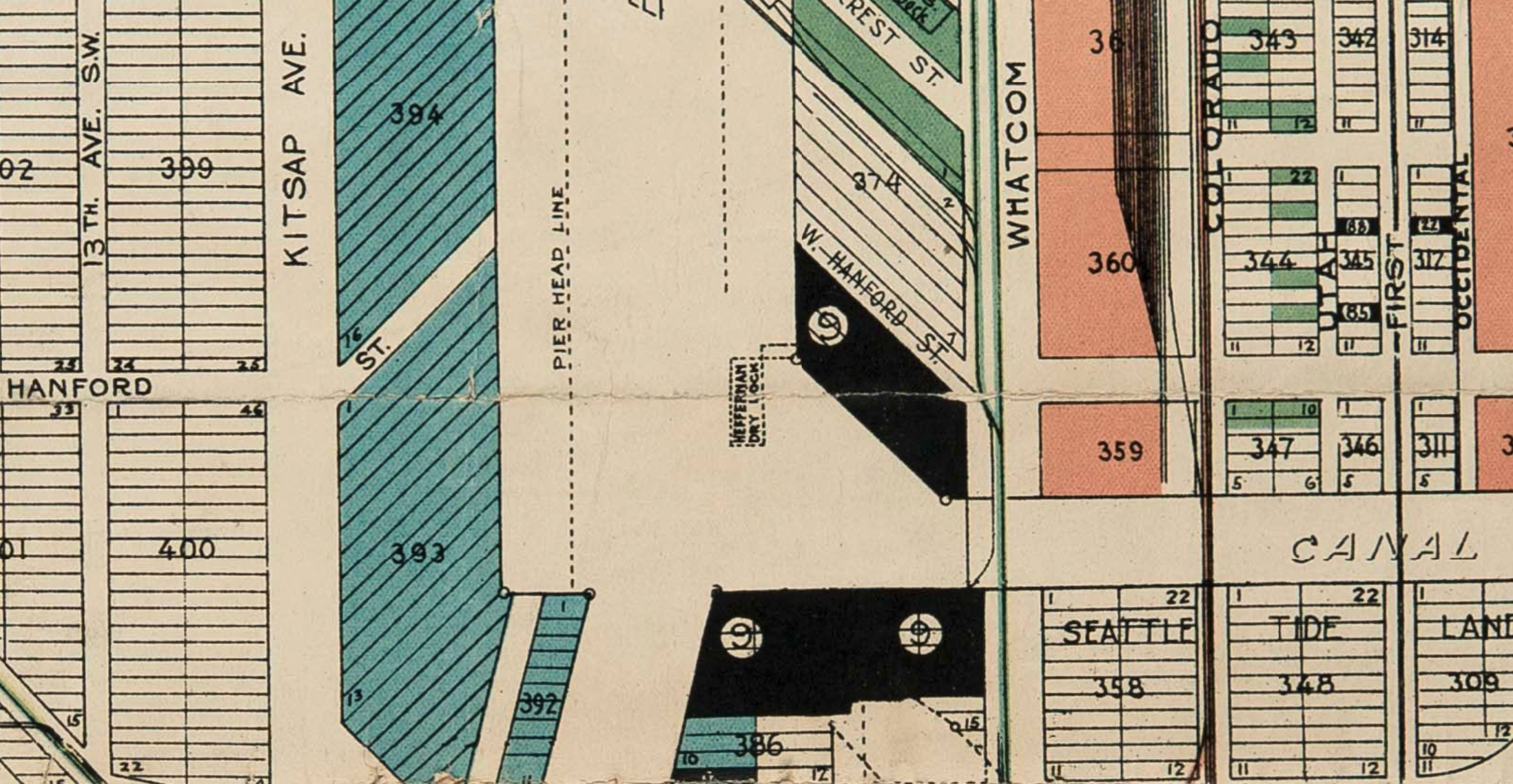
1913 map of Seattle tidelands showing Heffernan Engine Works property in black, labeled "9". Note the position of the drydock in the East Waterway.

In 1904, Heffernan Engine Works bought most of block 375 of Seattle tidelands at the junction of the East Waterway and the Canal Waterway for $28,500. It bought the remainder of the block for $12,000 in 1905. The company had the marshy area filled, and built workshops and docks. With 1,300 feet (400 m) of waterway frontage, Heffernan could berth multiple ships. In 1910, Heffernan bought the adjacent block 386, which also fronted the East Waterway, for $375,000. This land became the site of Heffernan's first shipyard.

In April 1907, the Heffernan Dry Dock Company was incorporated with a capitalization of $250,000. That same month, the new company purchased one of the largest floating drydocks on the west coast, which was then located at Quartermaster Harbor on Vashon Island. The company operated the drydock at Quartermaster Harbor while preparations, including dredging, were made to move it to Heffernan's property on the East Waterway. On 11 August 1909, the dock was towed to its new location. The drydock was 385 feet (117 m) long with a beam of 100 feet (30 m) and a lifting capacity, variously reported to be up to 7,500 tons.

In August 1910, Heffernan purchased the marine railway of Seattle Ship Yards Company. It was 250 feet (76 m) long and 56 feet (17 m) wide with a capacity to lift ships up to 4,000 tons. It was towed to the company's property on the East Waterway. With the addition of this facility, by 1912 the Heffernan shipyard grew to 75 employees.

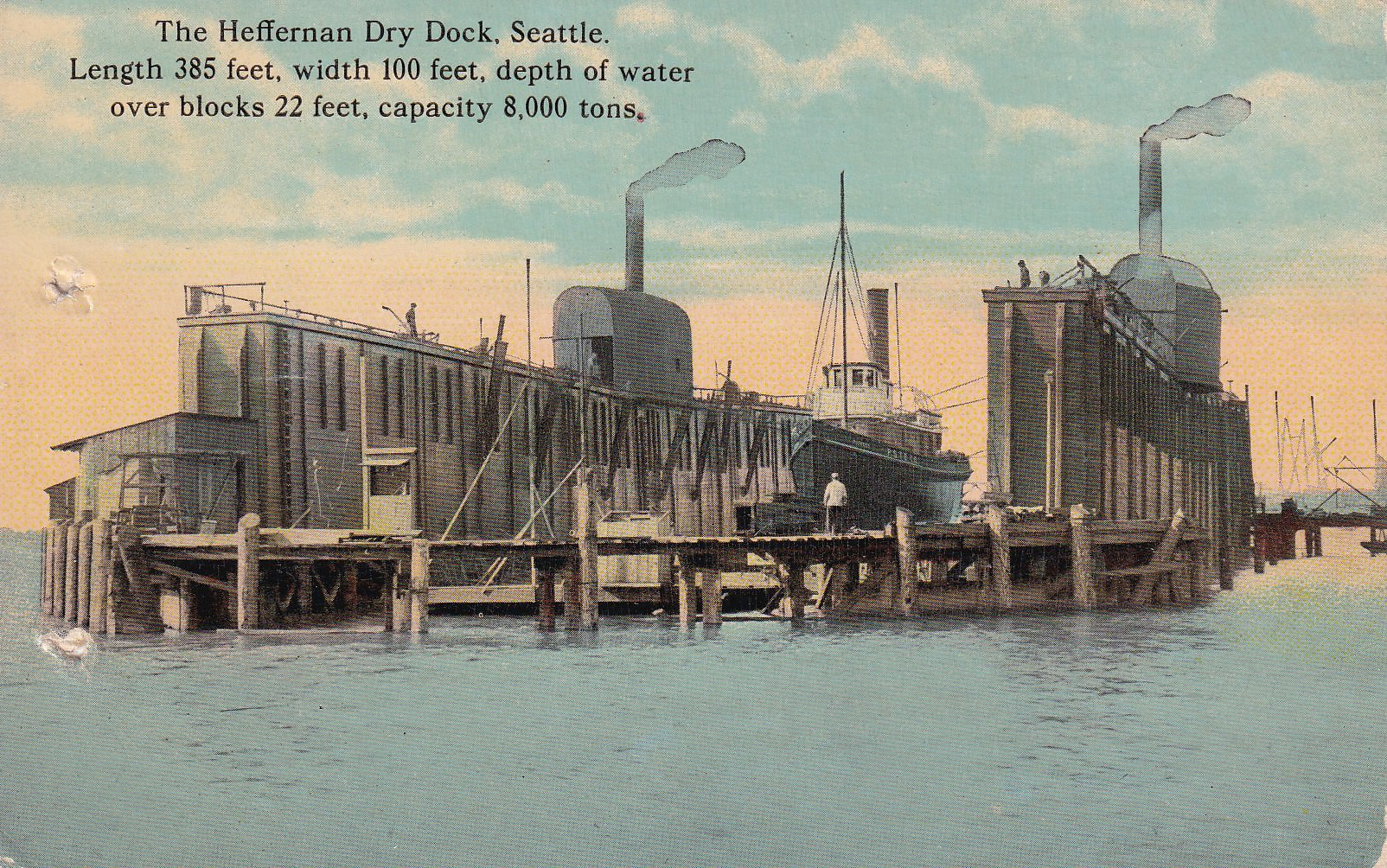
The Heffernan drydock in the East Waterway

Heffernan sold block 375, and the waterfront halves of blocks 376 and 386 to the Port of Seattle on 5 September 1913 for $440,000 to facilitate the port's plans for a deep-sea dock and cargo handling facility. In conjunction with the land sale, the company sold its drydock and marine railway to Seattle Construction & Drydock Company for a reported $550,000. This sale closed on 27 September 1913. While Heffernan Engine Works remained in operation building and repairing marine machinery, these transactions marked the end of Heffernan's first shipyard.

=== West Seattle shipyard (1918–1925) ===
American shipping needs in World War I brought about significant Federal funding for ship construction through the Emergency Fleet Corporation. John Heffernan went back into the shipyard business to take advantage of this opportunity and signed his first contracts with the Emergency Fleet Corporation on 22 May 1918. The company purchased 800 feet (240 m) of waterfront land consisting of lots 1 to 15 of block 449 of the Seattle tidelands. A new Heffernan shipyard was built there on Elliot Bay in West Seattle.

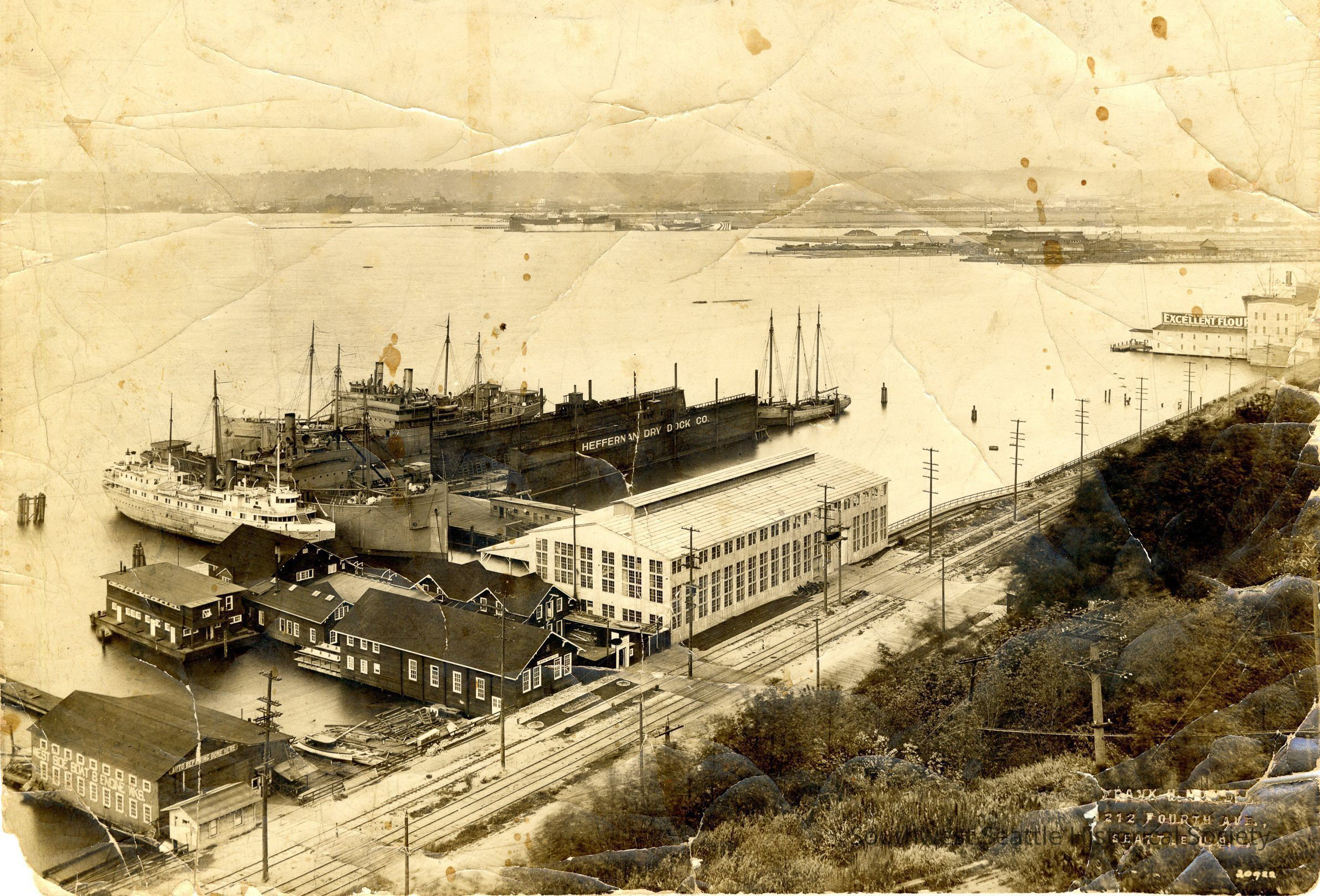
Heffernan Dry Dock facilities in West Seattle, circa 1918

On 3 May 1918, the Heffernan Dry Dock Company purchased the floating drydock of the Oregon Drydock Company. It was towed from Portland to Seattle. This dry dock was 340 feet long, with a beam of 80 feet, and a capacity to lift 3,500 tons. The dock was moored at 1650 Harbor Avenue SW at the company's property in West Seattle. The company also installed a marine railway that was 250 feet long and could accommodate vessels up to 2,500 tons. In 1918, Heffernan built a 1-story machine shop that was 84 feet by 160 feet at the new shipyard. By 1919, the company employed 400 workers there.

The Heffernan Engine Works machine shop in Pioneer Square moved to the Heffernan Dry Dock Company shipyard in 1923. The new shop was located at 1722 Harbor Avenue SW.

At the end of World War I, it became apparent that the Emergency Fleet Corporation had contracted for many more ships than were needed for peacetime. The four design 1001 ships for which Heffernan Engine Works built engines in 1918 were broken up in 1922. The worldwide glut reduced the cost of existing ships so much that new shipbuilding activities contracted. John Heffernan, now 60 years old, with significant real estate development, financial, and political interests, chose to close the shipyard in 1925. Heffernan's drydock was sold to Lake Union Dry Dock & Machine Works.

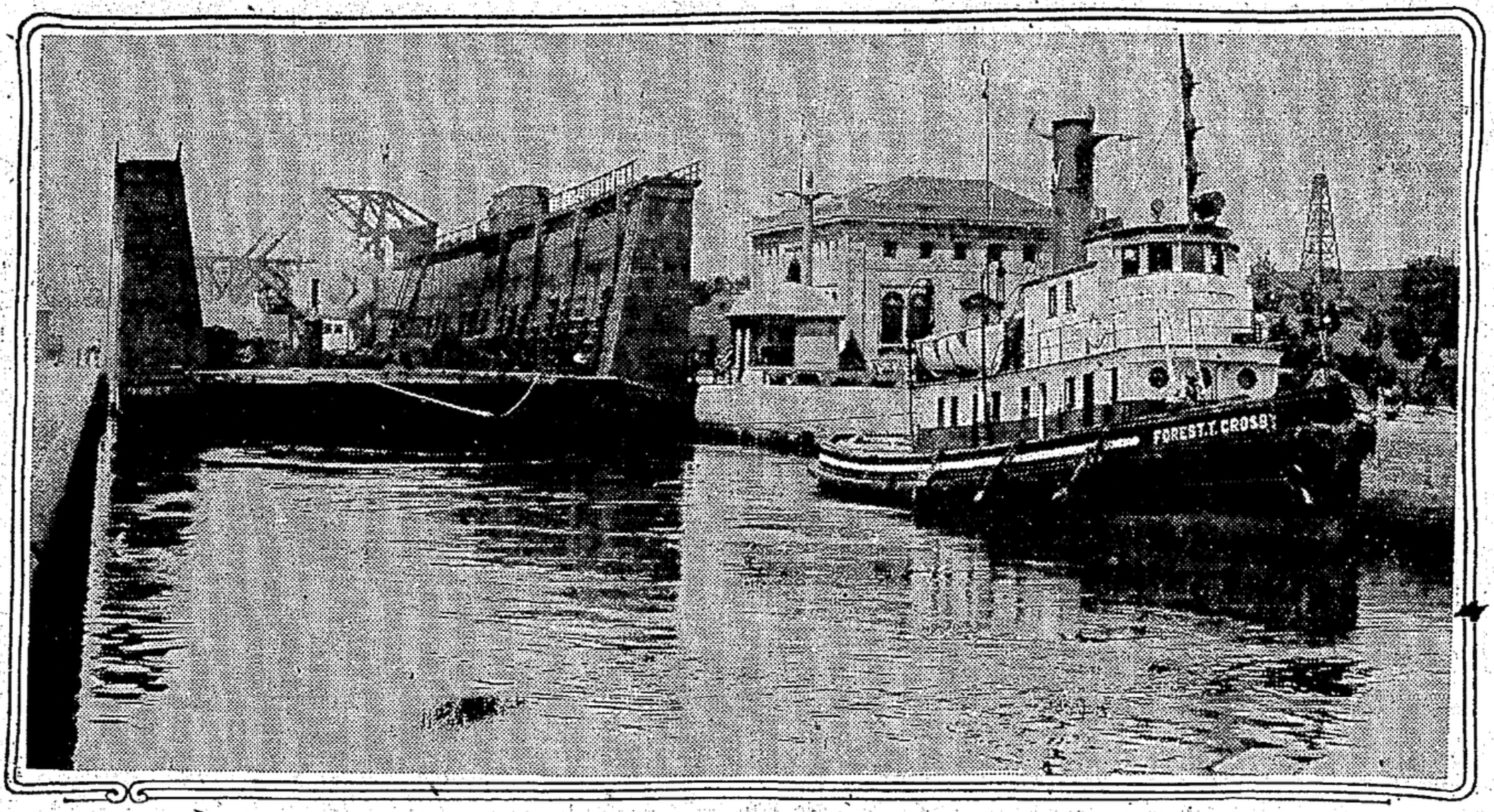
The West Seattle Heffernan drydock being towed to its new owner in Lake Union in July 1925

== Ship repair history ==
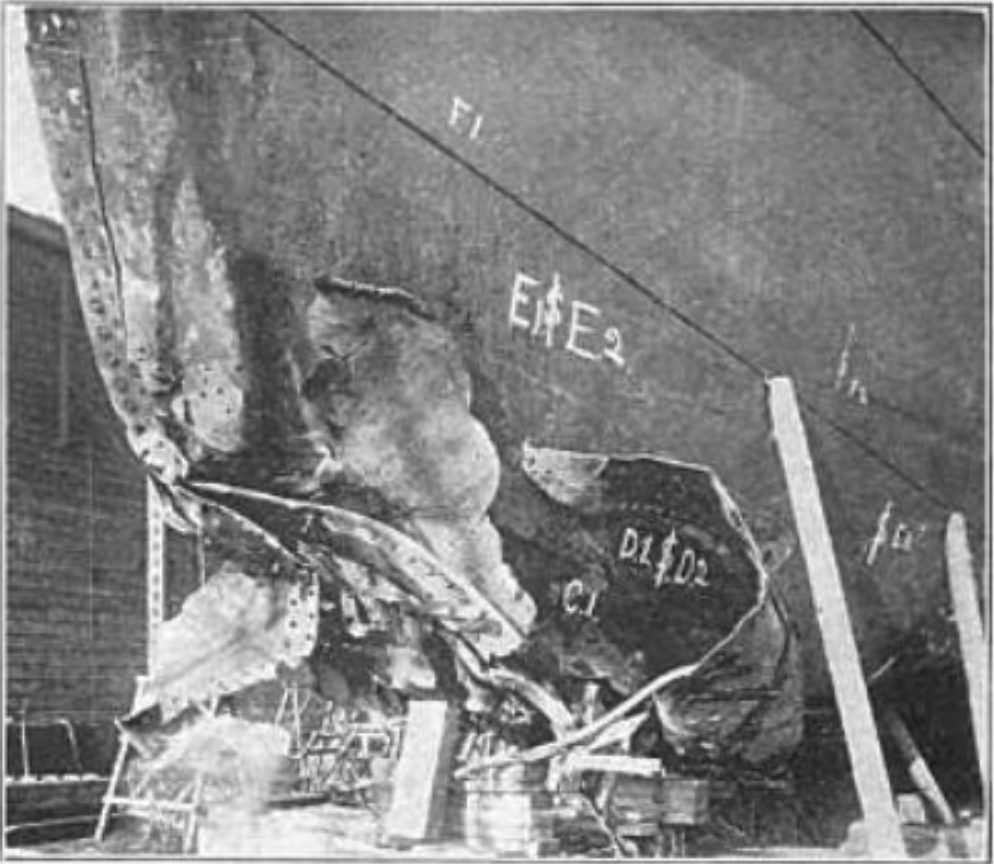
The bow of passenger liner Northwestern in Heffernan drydock for repairs after grounding in 1911

Heffernan repaired every type of ship from fishing boats to passenger liners with both wooden and steel hulls. These included U.S. flagged vessels and ships from around the world. They included vessels owned by the U.S Government and private shipping firms. While Heffernan Engine Works focused on boilers, engines, pumps, steering, and other equipment, Heffernan Dry Dock clients required a range of services from simple hull scraping and painting, to the replacement of steel hull plates crushed in grounding incidents. The number of vessels repaired numbered in the hundreds. The table below shows some of the more important:

Notable vessels repaired by Heffernan
Ship	Date	Repair
USAT Egbert	September 1901	
USAT Dix	January 1902	Engine and boiler overhaul
USRC Rush	April 1903	Engine and boiler overhaul
USAT Burnside	December 1903	
Light Vessel 67	September 1905	Machinery overhaul
Spokane	March 1907	Hull damage from grounding
USAT Crook	August 1907	
Senator	1908	
USLHT Heather	July 1909	Replaced boiler furnaces
USLHT Armeria	1910	Engine room and crew quarters overhaul
Northwestern	December 1911	Hull damage from grounding
Victoria	March 1911	Hull damage from grounding
USC&GS Carlile P. Patterson	December 1912	
USC&GS Lydonia	January 1921	
USC&GS Surveyor	January 1921	
Roosevelt	February 1923	Conversion to tug
USCGC Haida	April 1922	
USC&GS Discoverer	November 1923	
USAT Dellwood	December 1923	
USCGC Unalga	December 1923	

== Shipbuilding history ==
Heffernan Engine Works built engines, boilers, and other machinery for new ships throughout its history. In some cases, Heffernan contracted to deliver entire ships, subcontracting the construction of the hull. In other cases, it acted as a subcontractor, delivering engines to be installed under other companies' contracts. One source wrote that Heffernan Engine Works built engines and machinery for nineteen ships by 1905.

Vessels built by Heffernan Engine Works
Ship	Photo	Original Owner	Launched	Note
Irene Official # 100777		Pacific Tug Company	1902	Hull built by Crawford & Reid at Tacoma
John McCracken Official # 77571		City of Portland, Oregon	18 December 1902	Hull built by Ballard Dry Dock & Shipbuilding Company
Major Evan Thomas		US Army Quartermaster Corps	12 July 1904	Hull built by the T. C. Reed Shipyard in Ballard.
Florence Official # 201353		Juneau Ferry & Navigation Company	20 September 1904	Hull built by the T. C. Reed Shipyard in Ballard. Capsized on launching.

Partial list of vessels whose engines were built by Heffernan Engine Works
Ship	Photo	Original Owner	Launched	Note
Mary C. Official # 93374		Henry Cayou	1903	Hull built by Reid & Cayou at Decatur Island. Double-expansion engine: 12 inch high-pressure, 23 inch low-pressure, with 23 inch stroke.
ClallamOfficial #127769		Puget Sound Navigation Company	15 April 1903	Hull built by E. W. Heath at Everett. Double-expansion engine: 17 inch high-pressure, 42 inch low-pressure, with 28 inch stroke. Sank 8 January 1904.
JeffersonOfficial # 201073		Alaska Steamship Company	2 April 1904	Hull build by E. W. Heath shipyard. Triple-expansion engine: 20 inch high-pressure, 32 inch intermediate-pressure, 56 inch low-pressure, with 35 inch stroke.
AthlonOfficial # 107610			15 December 1900	Heffernan built a replacement engine in January 1906 for the ship's original engine which suffered a catastrophic failure in December 1905.
West SeattleOfficial # 203946		West Seattle Land & Improvement Company	13 April 1907	Hull built by E. W. Heath shipyard.
USLHT FernOfficial # 234815		U.S. Lighthouse Service	6 February 1915	Hull built by Hall Brothers Marine Railway & Shipbuilding Company. Triple-expansion engine: 10 inch high-pressure, 17.5 inch intermediate-pressure, 28 inch low-pressure, with 18 inch stroke.
BonnafonOfficial # 216847		U.S. Shipping Board	8 June 1918	Hull built by Nilson & Kelez Shipbuilding Company. Triple-expansion engine: 19 inches high-pressure, 32 inches intermediate-pressure, 56 inches low pressure with a stroke of 36 inches.
FosterOfficial # 216919		U.S. Shipping Board	3 July 1918	Hull built by Nilson & Kelez Shipbuilding Company.
OctoraraOfficial # 217231		U.S. Shipping Board	22 August 1918	Hull built by Nilson & Kelez Shipbuilding Company. Triple-expansion engine: 19 inches high-pressure, 32 inches intermediate-pressure, 56 inches low pressure with a stroke of 36 inches.
AdwayOfficial # 217721		U.S. Shipping Board	30 September 1918	Hull built by Nilson & Kelez Shipbuilding Company. Triple-expansion engine: 19 inches high-pressure, 32 inches intermediate-pressure, 56 inches low pressure with a stroke of 36 inches.
Virginia V Official # 222170		West Pass Transportation Company	9 March 1922	Triple-expansion engine: 10.5 inches high-pressure, 16.75 inches intermediate pressure, 28.5 inches low-pressure, with 18 inch stroke. This engine was installed in 1904 in the steamer Tyrus, later renamedVirginia IV. It is a twin to the engine installed in Major Evan Thomas. It was installed in Virginia V in 1922 and is the last operational Heffernan Engine Works engine.
