= USCGC Unalga =

Ship of the U.S. Coast Guard and U.S. Navy

USCGC Unalga (WPG-53)
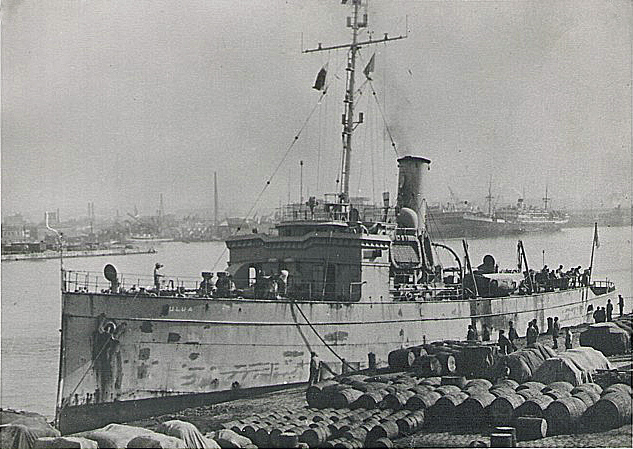
- Unalga in civilian service as Ulua in Marseille, France, in 1946

History

United States
- Name: USCGC Unalga
- Namesake: Unalga Island, Alaska, U.S.
- Operator: United States Coast Guard
- Builder: Newport News Shipbuilding and Drydock Corporation, Newport News, Virginia
- Cost: US$250,000
- Launched: 10 February 1912
- Sponsored by: Miss Elizabeth Hilles
- Christened: 10 February 1912
- Commissioned: 23 May 1912
- Decommissioned: 10 October 1945
- Maiden voyage: 20 April 1912, Hampton Roads, Virginia
- Fate: Turned over to War Shipping Administration for sale. Sold 19 July 1946.

General characteristics
- Displacement: 1,181 tons
- Length: 190 ft (58 m)
- Beam: 32.5 ft (9.9 m)
- Draft: 14.1 ft (4.3 m)
- Propulsion: Triple-expansion steam power-plant producing 1,300 ihp (970 kW)
- Speed: Max 12.5 knots
- Range: Cruising: 7.9 knots, 4200 mile range
- Complement: 73 (1930)
- Sensors & processing systems: SF-1, SA-2 detection radars; QCL-5 sonar (1945)
- Armament: 2 six-pounder rapid fire guns (1912); 2 × 3"/50 cal guns, 2 x 20mm guns, 2 x depth charge racks (1943)

USCGC Unalga (WPG-53) was a Miami-class cutter that served in the United States Revenue Cutter Service and later the U.S. Coast Guard and U.S. Navy. The early part of her career was spent patrolling the Pacific coast of the United States and the Bering Sea. After 1931 she did patrol work off Florida and in the Caribbean. After Unalga was sold in 1946, she was renamed after Jewish Agency leader Haim Arlosoroff and used for six months for moving Jewish refugees from Europe to Palestine before being forced to run aground by British Navy ships near Haifa.

== History ==
=== U.S. Revenue Cutter Service ===
==== Reporting for her first assignment ====
USRC Unalga, a cutter built for the Revenue Cutter Service by the Newport News Shipbuilding and Drydock Corporation, was authorized June 1911 and launched on 10 February 1912. After leaving the shipyard in convoy with USRC Apache, she arrived at Baltimore, Maryland, 27 April and was placed in commission by the Revenue Cutter Service at its depot at Arundel Cove, Maryland, on 23 May 1912. After spending the summer outfitting at the USRC Depot, Washington Navy Yard and Newport News Shipbuilding, she received orders to report to the RCS Northern Division at Port Townsend, Washington on 6 September 1912. Departing Norfolk, Virginia, on 26 September, Unalga arrived at Port Said, Egypt, on 1 November after making stops at ports of call at Gibraltar, Naples, Italy and Malta. While preparing to transit the Suez Canal, she received orders to report to US Ambassador William Woodville Rockhill at Constantinople. Rockhill directed that Unalga remain in the area to protect Americans in Turkey during the Italo-Turkish War in Libya. (Note: While Turkey was involved in the war with Italy in Libya, the Balkan League composed of Bulgaria, Serbia, Greece and Montenegro invaded European Turkey in an effort to liberate Ottoman controlled areas in the Balkans. While the Greeks and Serbs moved into Macedonia, three Bulgarian armies drove into Thrace, invested Adrianople and defeated Turkish armies at the battles of Kirk Kilissa and Lule Burgas. The success of that drive alarmed the foreign community in Constantinople which led Ambassador Rockhill to call for assistance in case an evacuation became necessary. The Navy Department dispatched USS Brutus while the Treasury Department instructed Unalga to remain in Port Said during the hostilities.) She departed Port Said on 17 December, the same day a peace conference was convened in London to settle differences between the Ottoman Empire and the Balkan League. After stops at Aden, Ceylon, Singapore, Manila, Yokohama, and Honolulu, Unalga reported to the Commander, RCS Northern Division at Port Townsend, Washington on 22 March 1913, which in turn assigned her to the Bering Sea Patrol.

==== Bering Sea Patrol ====
The first patrol Unalga sailed lasted from 3 May until 11 August when she returned to Port Townsend. On 21 September Unalga departed Port Townsend for a new assignment with the RCS Southern Division headquartered at San Francisco arriving for patrol duties on 25 September. She served with the Southern Division until detached on 25 March 1914. She was at Oakland for repairs for the first twenty days of April and left for duty in Alaska following completion of the repairs. For the next three years Unalga rotated between assignments in Alaska and Port Townsend and added the duty of enforcing the Neutrality Act when World War I started in Europe on 1 August 1914.

=== U.S. Coast Guard ===
==== Alaska patrols ====
On 28 January 1915 USRC Unalga became USCGC Unalga by virtue of the establishment of the United States Coast Guard by merger of the United States Revenue Cutter Service with the United States Life-Saving Service. (Note: President Woodrow Wilson signed Senate Bill 2337 on 28 January 1915 creating the United States Coast Guard through the merger of the United States Life-Saving Service with the United States Revenue Cutter Service. On that date the newly formed service had 25 sea-going cutters and 19 harbor tugs and launches and 270 stations. The bill authorized 4093 officers, warrant officers, and enlisted men. The service also consisted of one headquarters at Washington, D.C., 17 regional commands, four depots and one academy.) In February 1915 additional duties were assigned enforcing the North Pacific Fur Seal Convention of 1911 which related to prohibited pelagic sealing in the Bering Sea. Patrol work during 1915 and 1916 consisted of summers in Alaskan waters with sealing treaty duties, law enforcement, search and rescue, medical assistance to fishermen and others, and the delivery of mail to remote camps. Winters were spent at various locations along the Pacific Northwest coast doing law enforcement patrol work. In January 1917, Unalga was assigned her first winter patrol in Alaskan waters at the urging of representatives of the fishing industry to provide medical services to crews of fishing vessels as well as search and rescue work in remote waters. She stopped in Sitka, Alaska to investigate reports of a measles epidemic and to take on more coal for her first winter mission into the Gulf of Alaska. Unalga's first winter patrol was begun 30 January during a squall with hurricane force winds that iced the cutter over and threaten to sink her with the additional weight. After the starboard whaleboat was smashed by heavy seas and the radio masts snapped from the weight of ice, Captain Frederick Dodge made for the shelter of Yakutat Bay. (Note: The Johnson reference used for citing this section erroneously states that Captain Frederick G. Dodge's name was Francis G. Dodge when several sources say otherwise.) The cutter was listing starboard at twenty degrees and the crew had to clear ice from the decks and machinery with axes and steam hoses. The crew of Unalga spent the next week repairing damage to the cutter while the surgeon treated the ills of inhabitants of Yakutat and gave the resident missionary a short course in medicine. Each time the cutter would leave the shelter of the bay another gale would appear, but Dodge took care to seek shelter before the cutter was as severely iced as the first time. Unalga was recalled to Seattle on 6 March after steaming 3000 miles, boarding 342 vessels, having given medical aid to 19 individuals, of whom three were fishermen.

=== U.S. Navy and World War I ===
On 6 April 1917 the United States declared war on the "Imperial German Government" and the Coast Guard was placed under the jurisdiction of the U.S. Navy for the duration of the war by executive order signed by President Woodrow Wilson. Duties for Unalga did not change under Navy control initially and she left for her usual summer patrol work in Alaskan waters on 4 May. At the end of the summer cruise, she was assigned submarine tender duties with the Twelfth Naval District and home-ported at San Pedro, California, arriving 17 October. On 6 May 1918 she left Seattle for her usual Alaska patrol work, but in late May the captain was notified by radio to report to Unalaska to assist with an influenza epidemic. The crew tended eighty sick persons, distributed food, made coffins and buried the dead. In mid-June Unalga steamed to Bristol Bay and up the Nushagak River to Dillingham, Alaska providing medical services to the ill and burial details for the dead. By the end of June the epidemic had abated and Unalga resumed patrol work in the Gulf of Alaska. She returned to San Pedro and submarine tender duties on 17 October 1918. On 11 November 1918 the armistice ending World War I was concluded but Navy control of the Coast Guard did not end until 28 August 1919 when President Wilson signed an order returning the Coast Guard to Treasury Department control.

=== Return to the Coast Guard ===
==== Patrol work in Alaska ====
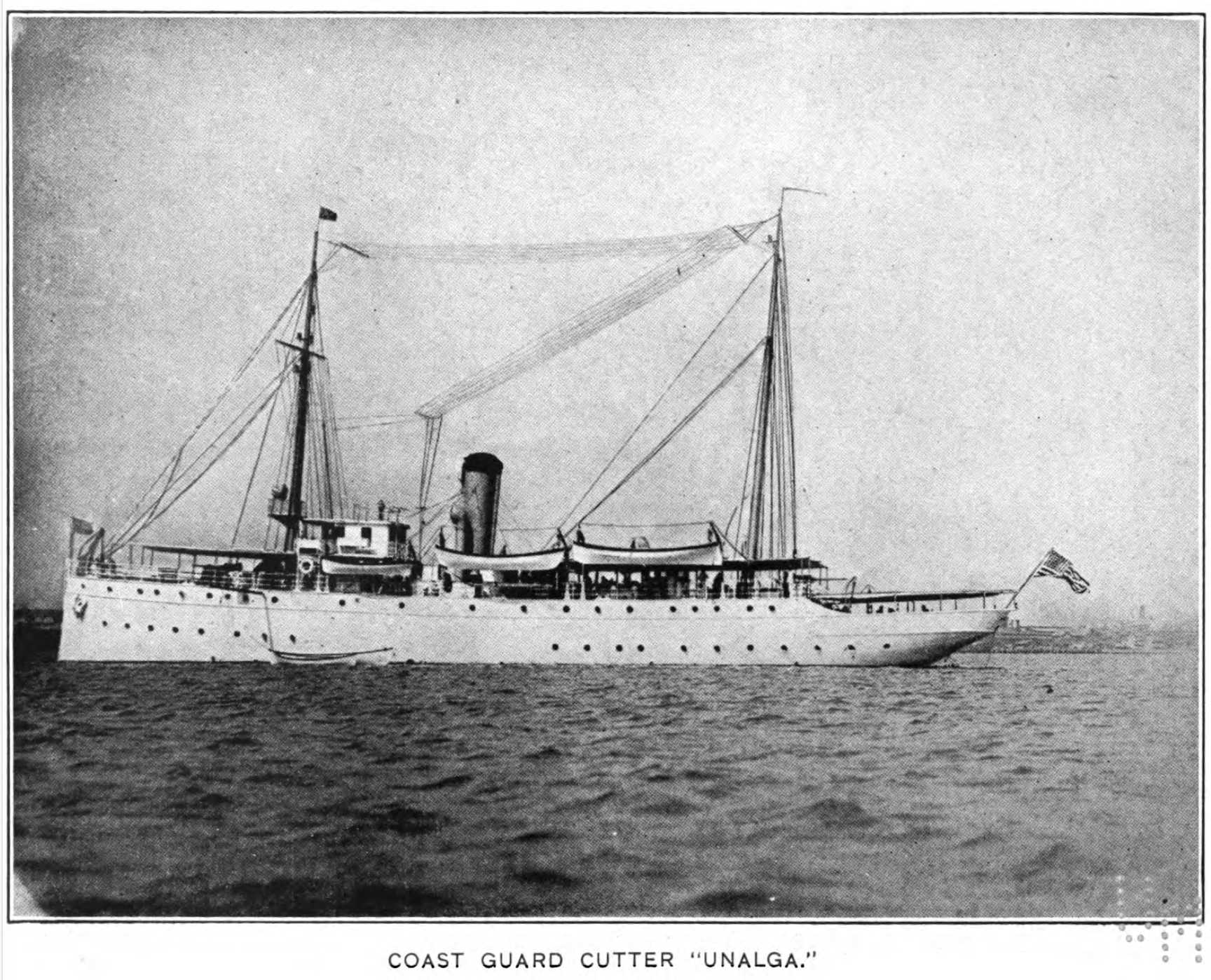
USCGC Unalga in 1920

Unalga's schedule of summers in Alaska and winter assignments with the Northern Division continued unchanged after the Treasury Department resumed control of the Coast Guard. Duties performed included search and rescue, fisheries patrols, treaty enforcement, delivery of supplies and mail to remote areas, transport of officials and prisoners, medical care, and law enforcement. A portion of each winter in the years 1922 to 1926 was spent on maintenance availabilities and repair work to the cutter. For example, she was hauled out at the Heffernan drydock in Seattle in December 1923. In February 1927, Unalga arrived at Winslow, Washington for a six-week overhaul, leaving 15 April for regular patrol duties in Alaska. On 4 November 1927, she collided with the 15 gross register ton motor vessel Eurus in Dixon Harbor in Southeast Alaska where she had towed Eurus after Eurus′s engine broke down near Cape Spencer, while trying to get a new towline to Eurus after the original towline parted; Eurus sank 20 minutes later, and Unalga rescued her crew of two. On 27 June 1930, Unalga received orders to report to the Coast Guard Depot at Curtis Bay, Maryland for extensive repairs.

==== Decommissioning ====
Unalga departed Seattle bound for Maryland on 26 July 1930 and arrived at the depot on 5 September. She was placed out of commission on 16 February 1931 and moved to the Philadelphia Navy Yard for repair on 18 February. Repairs at the Navy repair facility were completed and she left Philadelphia for Curtis Bay on 27 June, where additional work was completed. Unalga was again placed in commission 23 April 1932.

==== Port Everglades and the Navy ====
On 14 May 1932, Unalga left the Curtis Bay depot bound for her assignment at Port Everglades, Florida, and she arrived on 24 May for patrol duties. On 7 September 1933 she left Port Everglades for Key West, Florida, after being assigned to the Navy Special Service Squadron to be used to patrol the Florida Straits during a series of revolts that eventually put Fulgencio Batista in power in Cuba. Unalga responded along with cutters Gresham, Yamacraw, and Tuscarora; all stationed in Southern or Gulf ports. The Navy returned her to the Coast Guard on 1 November 1933 after the troubles in Cuba ended, and she returned to patrol work at Port Everglades. She served in the Port Everglades area until 1935 when she was transferred to San Juan, Puerto Rico. During this time Unalga provided rescue service to the stricken Pan American clipper ship, Dominican Clipper, NC15376. As reported in the Boston Globe, Unalga rescued 15 of the 27 passengers when the clipper crashed on landing in San Juan harbor on 3 October 1941. Shortly after she transferred to San Juan, Unalga was the oldest cruising cutter in the Coast Guard inventory.

=== U.S. Navy and World War II ===
Unalga served as a patrol cutter for the Coast Guard at San Juan performing law enforcement duties until 1 November 1941 when President Franklin D. Roosevelt transferred by executive order the whole Coast Guard to the control of the Department of the Navy. The Navy assigned her to anti-submarine patrols operating out of San Juan. In September 1943, Unalga was assigned to the Motor Torpedo Boat Squadron Training Center at Melville, Rhode Island where she served as a "target ship" for PT boats and then recovered the test torpedoes. In June 1945, she was relieved of those duties and assigned to the 5th Naval District at Norfolk, Virginia, where she assumed patrol work.

=== Immigration ship ===
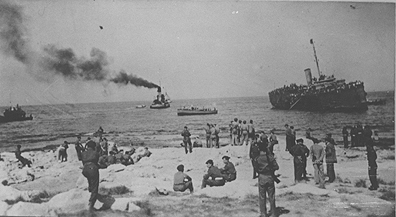
Haim Arlosoroff (right) aground off Bat Galim, British Mandatory Palestine in 1947

On 10 October 1945 the U.S. Navy decommissioned Unalga and turned her over to the War Shipping Administration. Subsequently, she was purchased by the 'Weston Trading Company' which was a front company of the Hagana. The Hagana used this company to purchase ships for Aliyah Bet, which was the name used for the immigration of Jewish refugees to British Mandatory Palestine. She was renamed the Ulua, after a river in Honduras, appropriate to the Honduran registry her new owners acquired for her. She was manned in the port of Baltimore by 27 crew members, most of them Jewish volunteers and led by two naval officers from Palestine, the Captain Gad Hilev and the Chief Engineer Ephraim Tsuk. On October 16, a moving ceremony was held on the ship in which the volunteers were sworn in to the 'Hagana' organization, and the next day it sailed for Marseilles.

On October 17, 1946, she sailed from Baltimore to Marseilles, where she was outfitted to accommodate a long journey with many refugees. At this juncture, the Ulua was assigned a Jewish Palestinian crew to command the American volunteers and the ship. The administrative commander of the ship was Arie 'Lova' Eliav, an officer of the Haganah. with him came his escorts: Nissan Levitan, Israel Auerbach, Zvi 'Miri' Katznelson and Moshe "Music" Gidron on communications.The Ulua left Marseilles on January 1, bound for Sweden where she was to collect her first group of refugees.

After receiving word that the Swedish harbors were closed by ice she put in to Copenhagen on January 21, 1947. During the several days she was harbored in Copenhagen, Danish officials boarded the Ulua and intended to interfere with her continued journey for safety reasons. In further conversation, over Brandy, it was mentioned that the Loyd's British maritime intelligence suspected that the Ulua intended to transport prostitutes to South America. In further conversation with the crew, it was acknowledged that the true mission of the Ulua was to transport Jewish refugees to British mandated Palestine. In turn, the Danish commander disclosed that he had served in the Danish underground in WW II and had aided Danes and Jews to escape the Nazis. Thereafter, the Danish commander took special care and interest in the Ulua and allowed her to resupply and sail to Sweden.

On the Friday morning, January 24, 1947, the Ulua arrived at the Swedish Port of Trelleborg and were met on the pier by a train, from which 664 passengers boarded the ship. More than 500 of these passengers were young women who were rescued from Nazi concentration camps. It was rumored that the source of this rescue was a secret deal between Swedish officials. and Heinrich Himmler, the Gestapo chief, who was trying to escape retribution by the allied forces. Upon their arrival to Sweden, these women were in poor health from their prolonged imprisonment in the camps. The Swedish government and the Jewish community cared for these women. In time, they were nourished back to health and given clothes, personal items and 2 suitcases each, with which to carry their belongings on board.

On January 31, 1947 the Ulua set sail from Trelleborg headed for Palestine, passing through Le Havre, France to refuel. As in Copenhagen, British intervention again threatened the voyage, as French tugboats blocked the ship and truckloads of armed police deployed on the dockside. Through negotiation with the Haganah office in Paris the ship was eventually allowed to sail, with approval to carry 100 refugees. After her departure from Le Harve, the Ulua encountered a severe storm in the Bay of Biscayne with winds up to 70 MPH. As the weather calmed, the ship the Ulua passed through the Straits of Gibraltar headed to the North African coast docking in Algiers and Tunis where she received orders to collect additional refugees in Italy.

Subsequently, the Ulua sailed to Gallipolli to receive detailed instructions on the collection of 700 refugees from Metaponte, Italy. To prepare for additional refugees, the crew and passengers had to transfer fuel from barrels to tanks and dispose of the barrels overboard. Furthermore, the woman collected in Sweden had to extract a few vital belongings that they could sleep on as a pillow and discard both of their suitcases. At Metaponte, the Ulua shot a cable to the beach and refugees were boarded by rafts attached to the cable. At the last moment, Haganah's top representatives asked the commander of the Ulua to take an additional 50 children, that left behind from every voyage in the past 2 months. The crew gave up their bunks and the children came on board.

Thus, the Ulua was underway, to breach the British blockade of Mandated Palestine, with 1,414 refugees rescued from Nazi concentration camps. In anticipation of the blockade and with the possibility of British soldiers boarding the ship, the crew and passengers were arranged in several group of resistance, using stacked bolts, cans of food, wooden clubs and hoses to shoot streams of water or hot oil. On the morning of February 27, 1947, the Ulua was sailing along the coast of Eastern Egypt when a British Halifax bomber appeared overhead, after which the Ulua was never without surveillance of British ships. As she was tracked by the British, without further need for discretion, the Haganah renamed the Ulua as the Haim Arlosoroff after the assassinated leader of the Jewish Agency. The Haim Arlosoroff was subsequently intercepted by the Royal Navy destroyer HMS Chieftain and after several failed attempts by British soldiers to board, several soldiers were able to breach the engine room. Yet in the commotion, the ship was able to run aground at to the beach of Bat Galim, Haifa. As it happened, the beach of Bat Galim was the opposite the location of a British compound. All refugees who escaped overboard, were rounded up by the soldiers guarding the beach. Thus, all the crew and passengers, some of whom were injured, were arrested and deported to Cyprus.

=== Wreck ===
The wreck laid on the beach until 1953, when the top of the wreck was broken up in situ for scrap, and the lower section was sunk in deeper water. The wreck now lies 100 meters away from the beach, in shallow water 5 meters deep.

=== Monument ===
After crowdfunding, a monument to the ship's legacy was installed in 2024 on Bat Galim beach, 70 meters away from the wreck.

== See also ==
- USCGC Tampa (1912), her sister ship.

== Bibliography ==
- "Alaska Shipwrecks, A comprehensive Accounting of Alaska Shipwrecks and Losses of Life in Alaskan Waters of Alaska Shipwrecks". Alaska Shipwrecks. Alaskashipwreck.com.
- "U.S. Coast Guard General Order No.1" (PDF). Historic Documents & Publications. U.S. Coast Guard Historian's Office.
- "Record of Movements, Vessels of the United States Coast Guard, 1790–December 31, 1933" (PDF). U.S. Coast Guard, Department of Transportation.
- "Two Babies Missing as Pan-American Clipper Dives into Puerto Rica Bay" (PDF). Boston Globe-Herald. 3 October 1941.
- "Unalga, 1912". Browse by Topic, Cutters. U.S. Coast Guard Historian's Office.
- Register of the officers, vessels and stations of the United States Coast Guard, January 1, 1917. U.S. Government Printing Office. 1917.
- Canney, Donald L. (1995). U.S. Coast Guard and Revenue Cutters, 1790–1935. Naval Institute Press, Annapolis, Maryland. ISBN 978-1-55750-101-1.
- Johnson, Robert Irwin (1987). Guardians of the Sea, History of the United States Coast Guard, 1915 to the Present. Naval Institute Press, Annapolis, Maryland. ISBN 978-0-87021-720-3.
- King, Irving H. (1996). The Coast Guard Expands, 1865–1915: New Roles, New Frontiers. Naval Institute Press, Annapolis, Maryland. ISBN 978-1-55750-458-6.
- Kroll, C. Douglas (2002). Commodore Ellsworth P. Bertholf: First Commandant of the Coast Guard. Naval Institute Press, Annapolis, Maryland. ISBN 978-1-55750-474-6.
- Larzelere, Alex (2003). The Coast Guard in World War I: An Untold Story. Naval Institute Press, Annapolis, Maryland. ISBN 978-1-55750-476-0.
- Noble (1990), Dennis L. "Historical Register U.S. Revenue Cutter Service Officers, 1790–1914" (PDF). U.S. Coast Guard Historian's Office.
- Strobridge, Truman R. and Dennis L. Noble (1999). Alaska and the U.S. Revenue Cutter Service, 1867–1915. Naval Institute Press, Annapolis, Maryland. ISBN 978-1-55750-845-4.
