= Pacific Tow Boat Company =

Defunct American tugboat firm

The Pacific Tow Boat Company (also seen as the Pacific Towboat Company) was a tugboat and towing firm based in the Puget Sound area of Washington state active in the first part of the 1900s.

== Course of business ==
The Pacific Tow Boat Company merged with the Chesley Tug Company and the Pacific Tug Company, a firm which had been established in 1900.

== Vessels ==
Vessels owned or employed by the Pacific Towboat Company include among many others the steam tugs Ruth, Defender, and Argo (launched 1900).
