= Admiral Theatre (Seattle) =

Coordinates: 47.581746°N 122.386722°W

- U.S. National Register of Historic Places
- Seattle Landmark
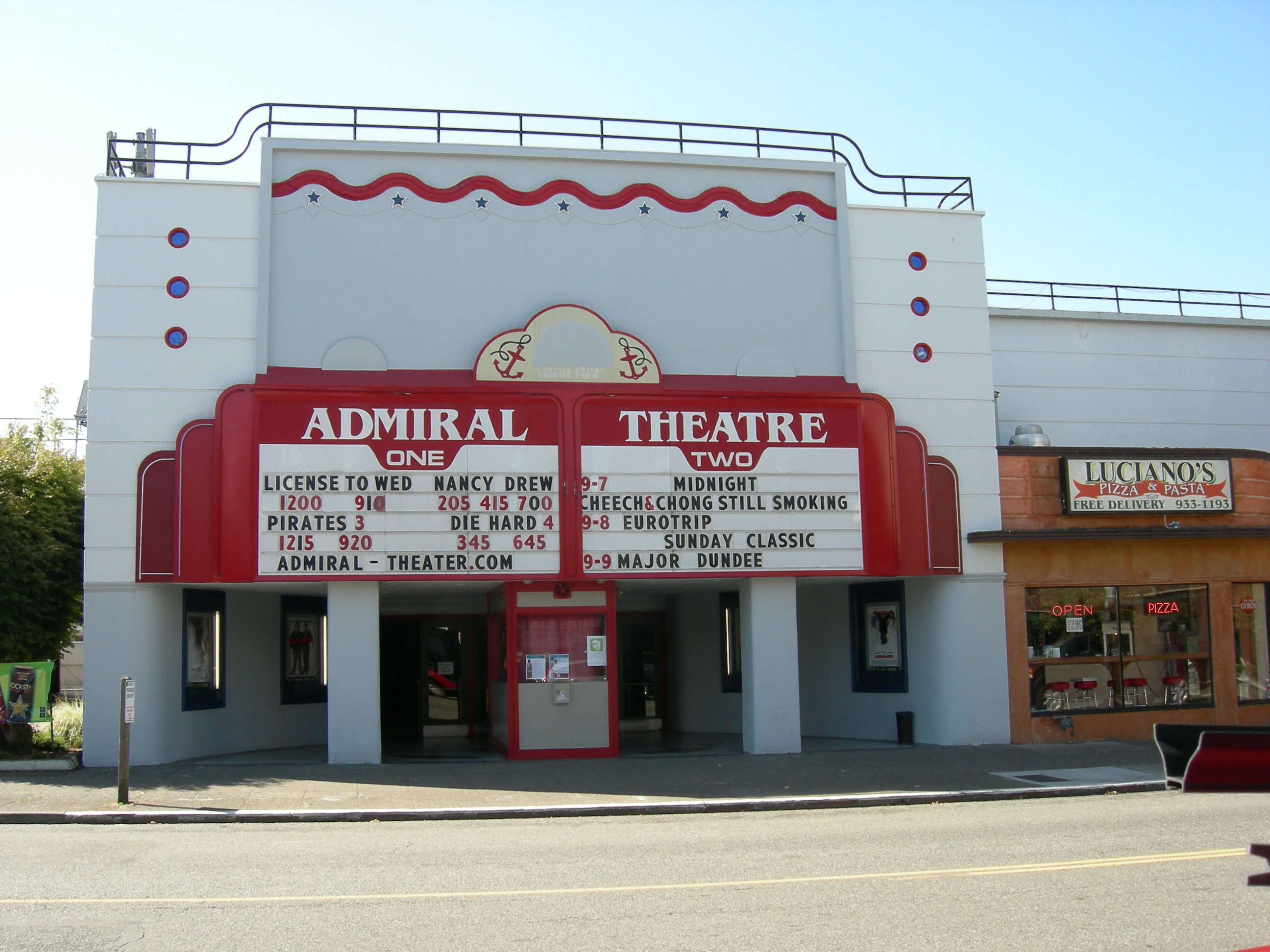

- Location within Washington (state)
- Location: Seattle, Washington
- Built: 1942
- Architect: B. Marcus Priteca
- Architectural style: Moderne
- NRHP reference No.: 89002098

Significant dates
- Added to NRHP: December 11, 1989
- Designated SEATL: December 13, 1993

The Admiral Theatre is a movie theater and historic landmark in the North Admiral neighborhood of West Seattle, Washington, United States. It was originally a second-run theater, but has since switched to showing new releases.

== History ==
The building dates to 1919 and was originally known as the Portola Theatre. With a somewhat nautical theme, the face of the theater sported two portholes. The Portola's screen was equipped with a lighting system, able to enhance the otherwise black and white scenes with hints of color, and a theater organ to provide music for silent films. In 1927, the theater was sold to Universal Chain Theatrical Enterprises, which installed Western Electric sound equipment in July 1929 for the Portola's first talkies. Ownership transferred to Seattle-based Far West Theatres in October 1930.

The Portola Theatre was bought in 1938 by John Danz's Sterling Theatres. It was then remodeled and renamed to the Admiral Theatre, a name chosen by popular vote courtesy of West Seattleites. The Admiral Theatre officially opened January 22, 1942. This 1,000 theater was designed by architect B. Marcus Priteca with interior decoration by Anthony Heinsbergen.

In 1986, the theater was sold by Sterling Theatres (later known as Sterling Recreation Organization) to Cineplex Odeon. After losing money due to declining attendance, Cineplex Odeon closed the theater in January 1989. In response, the Southwest Seattle Historical Society launched a grassroots preservation campaign that led the Seattle Landmarks Preservation Board to designate the building as a city landmark, protecting it from demolition while it remained closed. In 1992, local entrepreneur Marc Gartin purchased the building and reopened it, helping to keep the theater running as a second-run house. In 2008, operation of the theater business was acquired by Far Away Entertainment, a theater operator based in Bainbridge Island, while Gartin retained ownership of the property.

== Events ==
Alongside showing movies, the Admiral has been the host of performers, shows, and special events. For over ten years, The Rocky Horror Picture Show was performed regularly, with the last showing taking place on November 1, 2014. The Admiral Theatre was also frequented by J. P. Patches, a prominent local clown. The theater also hosts the Mommy Matinees, held regularly as an opportunity for parents and guardians to bring in their young children to watch a movie, but without the stress or worry of disrupting fellow viewers.

== Decor ==
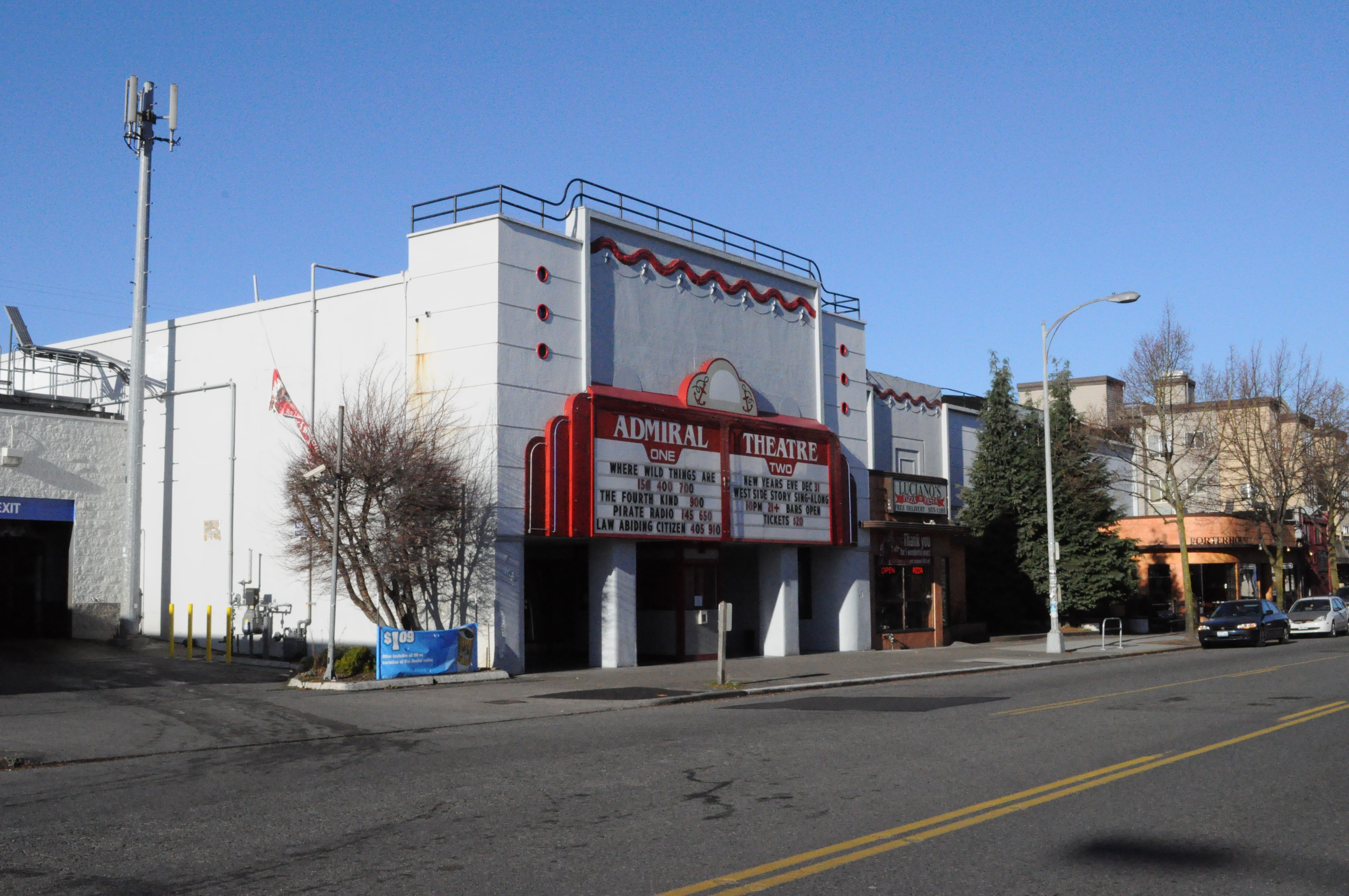
Exterior of the theater, as seen from California Avenue

Having expanded upon the Portola, the Admiral kept the original nautical theme and even expanded upon it over time. The auditoriums are labeled by "pier", green seahorses accompany the exit signs, the employee's room is known as "the crew's quarters", and the two portholes once decorating the exterior of the Portola can now be viewed just above the Admiral's lobby. Artwork brings the walls to life as well, entering the theater, you are greeted by a 1942 mural of George Vancouver behind the concession stand, spanning from floor to ceiling. In 1997, the theater added another nautical twist by hiring muralist, Jeff Greene, to paint an underwater scene in one of the auditoriums. These scenes are still visible with potential to be restored.

== Renovation ==
The theater has gone through many renovations and changes, starting with the initial remodel to prepare for the new Admiral Theatre's grand opening in 1942. In 1973, the Admiral was split into two auditoriums. In 2017, the theater opted for another renovation, turning the two theaters into a total of four. This build included an update with luxury seating, a higher quality sound system, and 3D effects.
