= SS Northwestern =

Passenger and freight steamship launched in 1889

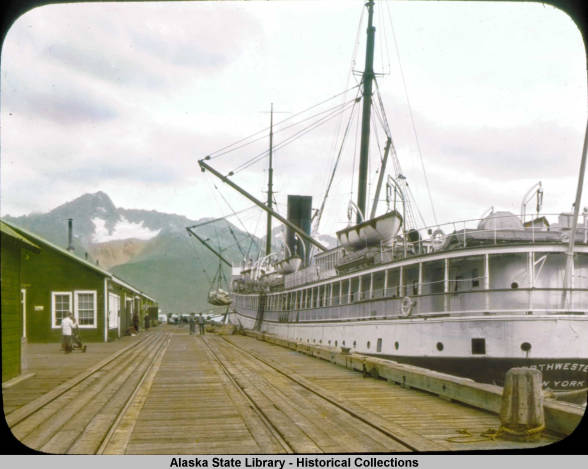
- Landing of SS Northwestern from Alaska and warehouses - Seward dock

History

United States
- Name: Northwestern
- Namesake: The Northwestern Steamship Company
- Builder: Delaware River Iron Ship Building and Engine Works
- Launched: November 23, 1889
- Fate: Sank at mooring, Captains Bay, Unalaska Island

General characteristics
- Type: Passenger and freight transport
- Length: 336 ft (102 m)
- Speed: 14 knots (26 km/h; 16 mph)
- S. S. Northwestern Shipwreck Site
- U.S. National Register of Historic Places
- Location within Alaska
- Location: Port Levashef, at the head of Captains Bay
- Nearest city: Unalaska
- Coordinates: 53°49′50″N 166°36′37″W
- NRHP reference No.: 94001065
- Added to NRHP: September 12, 1994

SS Northwestern, originally SS Oriziba, was a passenger and freight steamship launched in 1889 by the Delaware River Iron Ship Building and Engine Works, Chester, Pennsylvania, which spent most of its career in service in the waters of the Territory of Alaska. The ship from early in its career had a reputation for trouble, and was frequently involved in groundings, collisions with other ships, and with port facilities. She first served as a transport in the West Indies as Oriziba, and was acquired by the Northwestern Steamship Company in 1906, sailed around Cape Horn, and renamed Northwestern. For the next thirty years she worked along the Alaska coast, transporting people, mail, and goods, as well as ore from mining operations at Kennecott.

== Service history ==
On March 14, 1907, the steamer ran aground when a storm pushed her onto a reef in Beatson Bay near Latouche. Refloated sometime in April and docked at Latouche for temporary repairs. She departed May 25, 1907, for Esquimalt, British Columbia, under tow by Tug Salvor. She soon sprung a leak and was beached at Swanport near Port Valdez, sinking again. After more temporary repairs she was refloated and once more embarked. On June 4, 1907, both Northwestern and her tow ran aground in fog at the mouth of the Fraser River at Sand Head Shoal, she pulled herself off and then pulled off the tug. She was repaired at Victoria, British Columbia.

On February 14, 1909, Northwestern sighted a flare from the sloop Nugget, which had been blown out into the Gulf of Alaska off Cross Sound by a storm on February 9 during a voyage from Lituya Bay to Juneau, Alaska, and whose crew was abandoning her 75 nautical miles (139 km; 86 mi) off Cape Fairweather (58°48′30″N 137°56′45″W) after a second storm struck and destroyed her sails and rigging. Northwestern rescued seven crewmen from Nugget and transported them to Juneau.

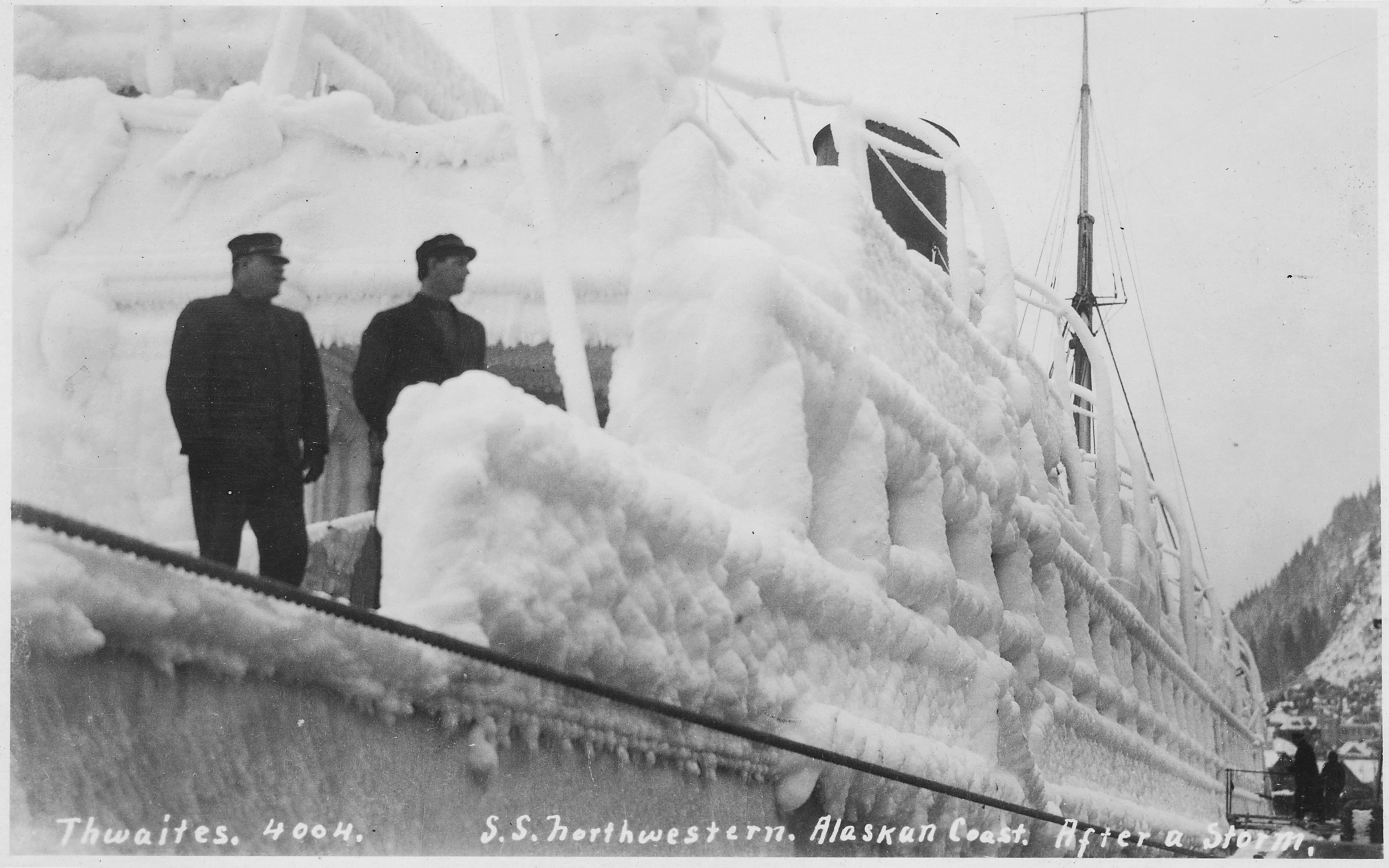
Postcard image of the Northwestern covered in ice after a storm

On December 3, 1910, she ran hard aground on Pile Point at the entrance to False Bay tearing a 40-foot (12 m) hole in her. Northwestern was refloated, repaired at the Heffernan drydock in Seattle and returned to service.

In April 1911 she participated in Cordova's "Copper Day" celebration commemorating the completion of the "Copper River and Northwestern Railroad" and first arrival of ore from the Kennicott Mine, she transported that shipment to Tacoma, Washington. On September 27, on arrival at Ketchikan, Alaska Territory, the signal wire to the engine room broke ordering "Full Ahead" instead of "Stop" causing a collision with the salmon canning ship Glory of the Seas, a former clipper ship, doing minor damage to both.

In January 1913 she ran aground near Valdez, Alaska Territory, in February she had a collision with Skagit Queen, and on September 12 a collision with H. B. Kennedy.

On October 6, 1915, she grounded on Potter Rock just south of Pennock Island in the Tongass Narrows near Ketchikan, Alaska Territory. She got off the next morning.

On July 25, 1933, Northwestern ran aground off Alaska's Sentinel Island Lighthouse and subsequently was beached on the Eagle River Sand Spit. Her passengers were taken off by a United States Government steamship.

== Final sinking ==
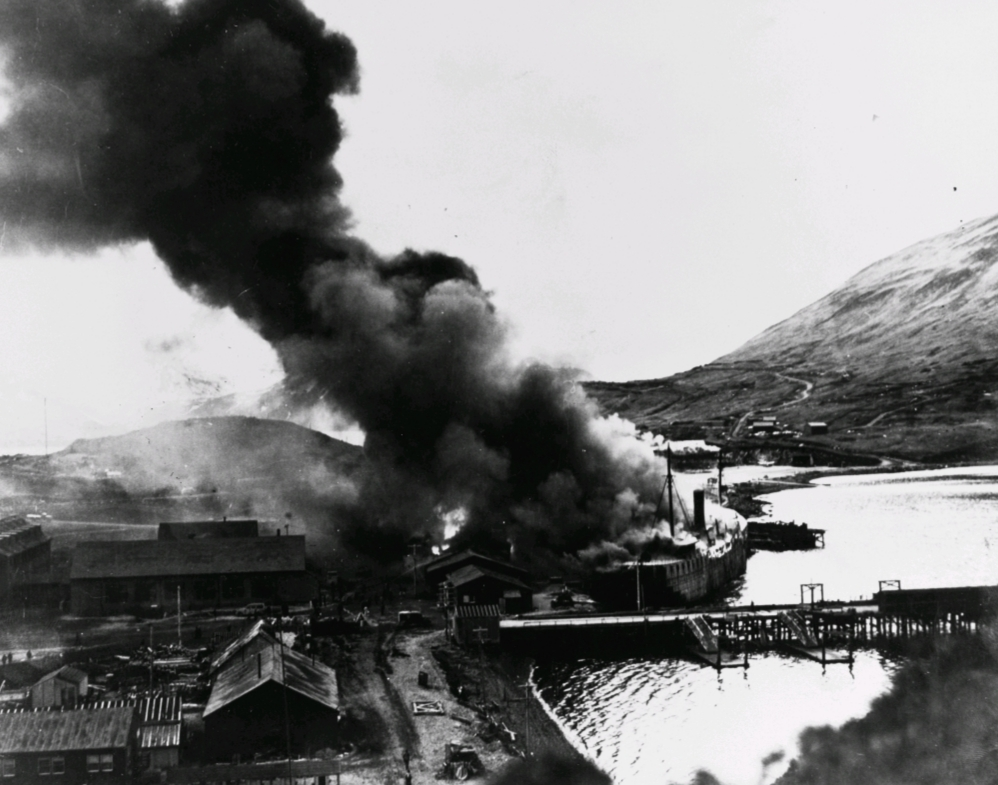
Northwestern in flames at Dutch Harbor, Unalaska, Alaska

Northwestern was pressed into service by the United States Navy during World War II, and was serving as housing for workers at Dutch Harbor on Unalaska when the area was bombed by the Japanese in June 1942. On June 4 a bomb struck her, inflicting extensive damage. Her hulk afterward was loaded with scrap and towed to Captains Bay in anticipation of eventually being towed to Seattle, Washington. Despite U.S. Navy records indicating that she was towed to Seattle, she in fact remained in Captains Bay, and eventually sank around 1946; there are differing accounts as to the circumstances of the sinking. Approximately 50 feet (15 m) of her hull is normally visible at the head of Captains Bay.

The site of the shipwreck was listed on the National Register of Historic Places in 1994.

== See also ==
- National Register of Historic Places listings in Aleutians West Census Area, Alaska
