= City of Seattle (steam ferry) =

Steam ferry

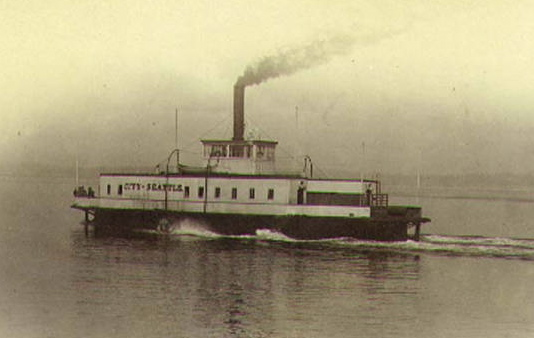
- City of Seattle c. 1891

History
- Name: City of Seattle
- Owner: West Seattle Land & Improv. Co.; Martinez & Benicia Ferry & Trans. Co.; U.S. Navy; Mare Island Ferry Company; and others.
- Cost: $35,000.
- In service: 1888
- Out of service: 1947
- Identification: US registry #126536
- Fate: Upper works preserved as houseboat

General characteristics
- Type: Steam ferry
- Tonnage: 272 gross; 187 regist.
- Length: 121.5 ft (37.03 m)
- Beam: 33.2 ft (10.12 m)
- Depth: 8.6 ft (2.62 m) depth of hold
- Installed power: twin single cylinder steam engine; cylinder bores 16 in (40.6 cm); stroke 60 in (152.4 cm), 135 hp (101 kW) per engine; boiler: single return-tube boiler 5.5 ft (1.68 m)diameter and 22 ft (6.71 m) feet long; working steam pressure 100 pounds.
- Propulsion: sidewheels
- Capacity: 500 passengers, 19 vehicles.

The City of Seattle was a side-wheel driven steam-powered ferry built in 1888. This vessel was the first ferry to operate on Puget Sound. City of Seattle was also used in the San Francisco Bay area starting in 1913. The ferry was known as YFB54 when owned by the U.S. navy in World War II, and as Magdalena during naval service and for a time following the war. The upper works of the ferry have been mounted on a barge hull, and are now in use as a houseboat in Sausalito, California.

== Design and construction ==
The City of Seattle was built in 1888 at Portland, Oregon by John Steffan and began regularly scheduled service on December 31, 1888. The ferry had a wide lower deck, called the "driveway", which carried wagons, horses and carts, as well as all passengers. On the upper deck there was a single pilot house, facing both ends, which was built around the smokestack.

== Puget Sound service ==
The ferry's first owners were the West Seattle Land and Improvement Company which placed the vessel on a route running between Seattle and Milton, in West Seattle. The Seattle terminus was at a dock located at First Avenue and Marion Street. Originally the fare to ride the City of Seattle was 15 cents, but it was soon reduced to 5 cents as part the owners' strategy to encourage purchase of its real estate developments in West Seattle.

In the summer of 1889, City of Seattle was making 10 trips daily on the route. The trip was popular and well-to-do persons began buying houses in West Seattle. A cable tramway was built to carry ferry passengers from the West Seattle dock up the bluff where the Improvement Company's main development projects were. The vessel was quick, and could often complete the 2-mile (3.2 km) run in less than 8 minutes.

The ferry encountered some competition, first from the small steamer Garden City, which made 17 trips per day, but that was more than the population at the time would support. Later more serious competition arose from Lady of the Lake. The Lady offered fares at 4 cents per ride, and then City of Seattle offered 40 rides for a dollar. This went on until the Lady burned one night while hauled out for repairs. There was talk of arson, but no crime was ever charged.

In 1907 City of Seattle was still on the same route, but demand had increased so much that a new and larger vessel was commissioned to handle the business. This was the West Seattle, which was built at Tacoma and entered regular service on June 27, 1907, on the Seattle – West Seattle route. City of Seattle was then shifted to run to the Luna amusement park then located at Duwamish Head. 1907 was the peak year for ferry transport on the Seattle-West Seattle run, with 103,000 passengers carried in July alone. After that, rising competition from the expanding network of street car lines over time proved too much for the West Seattle ferries, and City of Seattle was taken off the route in 1911.

== California service ==
City of Seattle as configured for the Benicia-Martinez ferry route

In 1913 the Improvement Company, through its subsidiary the Oregon & Washington Ferry & Nav. Co., sold City of Seattle to a California ferry concern, the Martinez and Benicia Ferry and Transportation Company, leaving only the West Seattle on the now money-losing route. After a hazardous voyage south in the tow of a steam schooner, City of Seattle reached San Francisco Bay and was placed on the ferry route from Benicia across the Carquinez Strait to Martinez

The new owners added second wheelhouse to the ferry, but never changed the vessel's name or the machinery. The ferry was also used on the route from Mare Island to Vallejo.

== Naval service ==
During World War II the ferry was extensively rebuilt by the government. The ferry was taken into government service in 1944, renamed YFB54 and used for the Mare Island service. The ferry was requisitioned-purchased by the U.S. Navy from the city of Martinez and delivered to the Mare Island Naval Shipyard on August 10, 1944. The ferry was renamed Magdalena on September 9, 1944. The ferry was assigned to the 12th Naval District, based San Francisco, and placed in service on November 23, 1944. The vessel was used to provide ferry service between Mare Island and Vallejo, California until the end of the war. The ferry continued operation under the 12th Naval District command until October 14, 1946, when at Mare Island the vessel was taken out of service. Later the ferry was transferred to Suisun Bay, and was struck from the Navy list on February 7, 1947. On December 25, 1947, ownership of the ferry was transferred to the United States Maritime Commission for disposal.

== Later years ==
After the war, the vessel was acquired by the Mare Island Ferry Company and renamed Magdalena. As of 1966 the ferry was owned by Sausalito resident Alexis Tellis, and registered as a yacht. The name was still City of Seattle, and propulsion was still by sidewheels, but the steam engines had been replaced by diesel power. Later the vessel was placed on pilings, painted yellow, and used as a house and office for the owner of a marina known as the Yellow Ferry Harbor in Sausalito, California.

== Present state ==
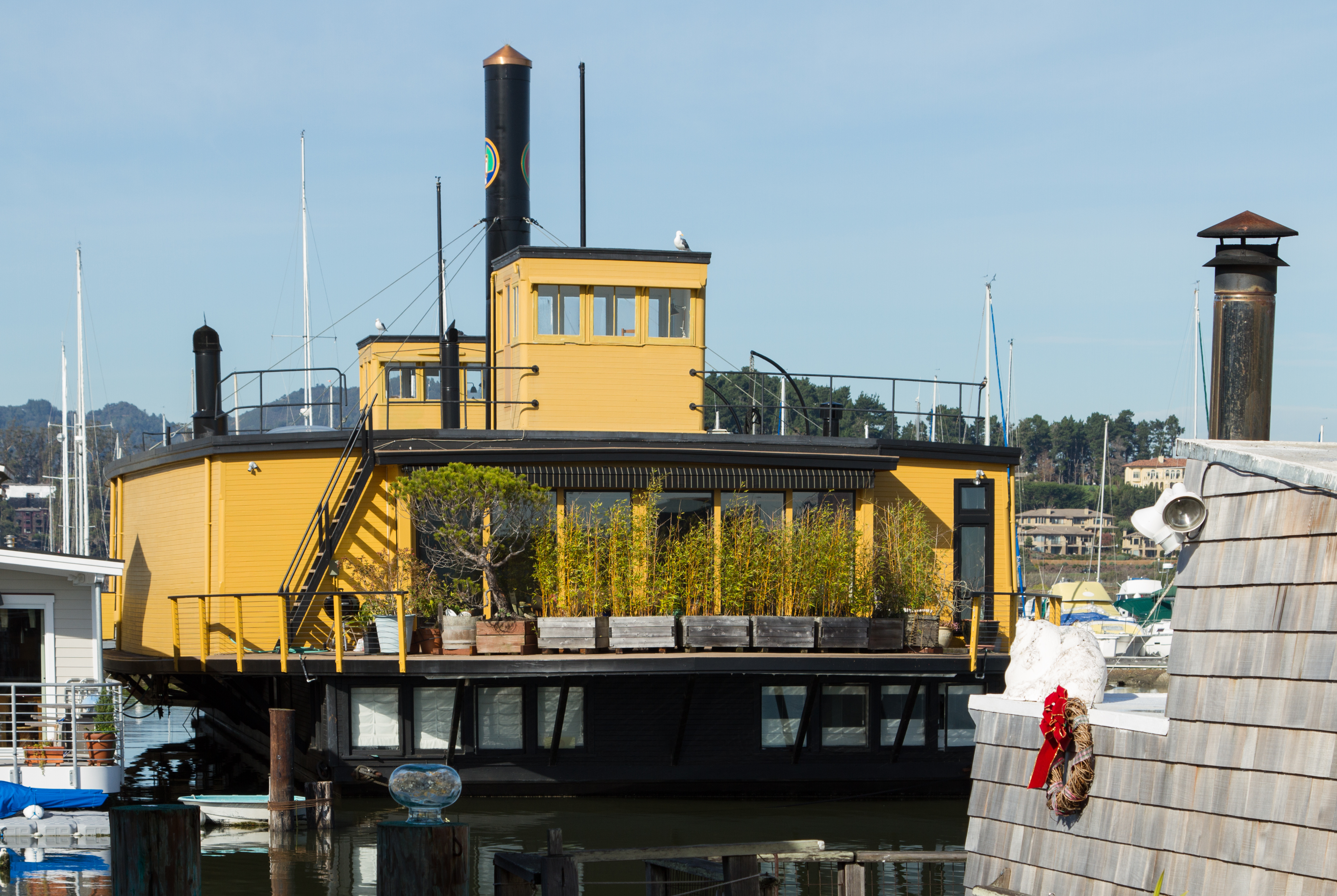
City of Seattle used as a houseboat

The upper works of the ferry have been mounted on a concrete barge and are now in use as a houseboat at Sausalito, California.

== See also ==
- Eureka (ferryboat)
- Ferries in Washington (state)
- Ferries of San Francisco Bay
- West Seattle (steam ferry)
