= Lady of the Lake (1897 steamboat) =

1897 steamboat in United States

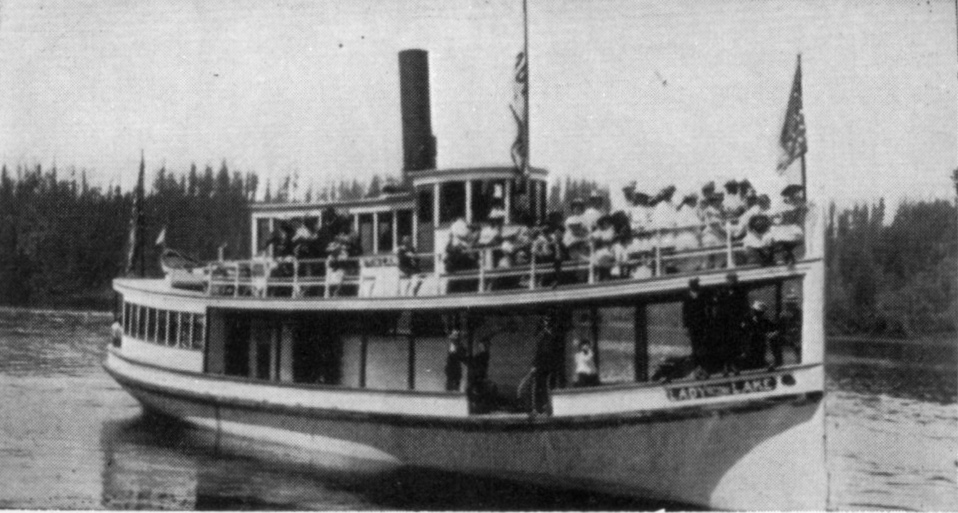
- Lady of the Lake

History
- Name: Lady of the Lake
- Owner: As Ruth: Pacific Tow Boat
- Route: Lake Washington
- Completed: 1897
- Fate: Destroyed by fire 1916

General characteristics
- Type: inland steamboat
- Length: 70 ft (21.34 m)
- Propulsion: steam engines; propeller

Lady of the Lake was a wooden steamboat that operated on Puget Sound from 1897 to 1903. Following a fire in 1903, the vessel was rebuilt as the tug Ruth.

== Career ==
In January 1897, Captain J. L. Anderson let a contract to N. C. Peterson to build a replacement for Quickstep, which burned at her dock earlier that month. The new ship incorporated the engine from Quickstep, which was salvaged after the fire. The new ship was christened Lady of the Lake. By June, 1897, Captain Anderson was sailing his old route from Leschi Park to Newcastle to East Seattle on Mercer Island with his new ship. By August 1897, however, he had sold Lady of the Lake to C. E. Curtis of Whatcom for $4,700, and bought Curtis' old ship, the steamer Effort, for $17. Curtis took the vessel to run on Puget Sound.

In 1903 the steamboat was running on the short commuter route across Elliott Bay between Seattle and West Seattle, and was operated by the vessel's owners, Captains Charles H. Gaffner and J. Holbrook, Chief Engineer Parks, and Purser Greenwood. engaged in a rate war first with the small passenger-only steamer Garden City then more seriously with the steam ferry City of Seattle. There were two collisions between the vessels during the rate war. The owners of Lady of the Lake reduced their fares to five cents, which prompted the ferry operators to allow 40 rides for one dollar.

== 1903 fire ==
June 18, 1903, Lady of the Lake was hauled out of the water in a shipyard in West Seattle when a fire broke out overnight. The origin of the fire was reported to be "not ascertained", with the vessel suffering approximately $3000 in damage. The rate war and the circumstances of the fire caused a rumor that arson was the cause. In any case, the vessel was a total loss. The hull and engines were salvageable however.

== Rebuild and final loss ==
In 1905, King and Winge rebuilt Lady of the Lake into the tug Ruth. In 1916, Ruth was being operated by Pacific Tow Boat Company, when the vessel was destroyed by fire at Ladysmith, BC.
