= West Seattle (steam ferry) =

Ship built in 1907

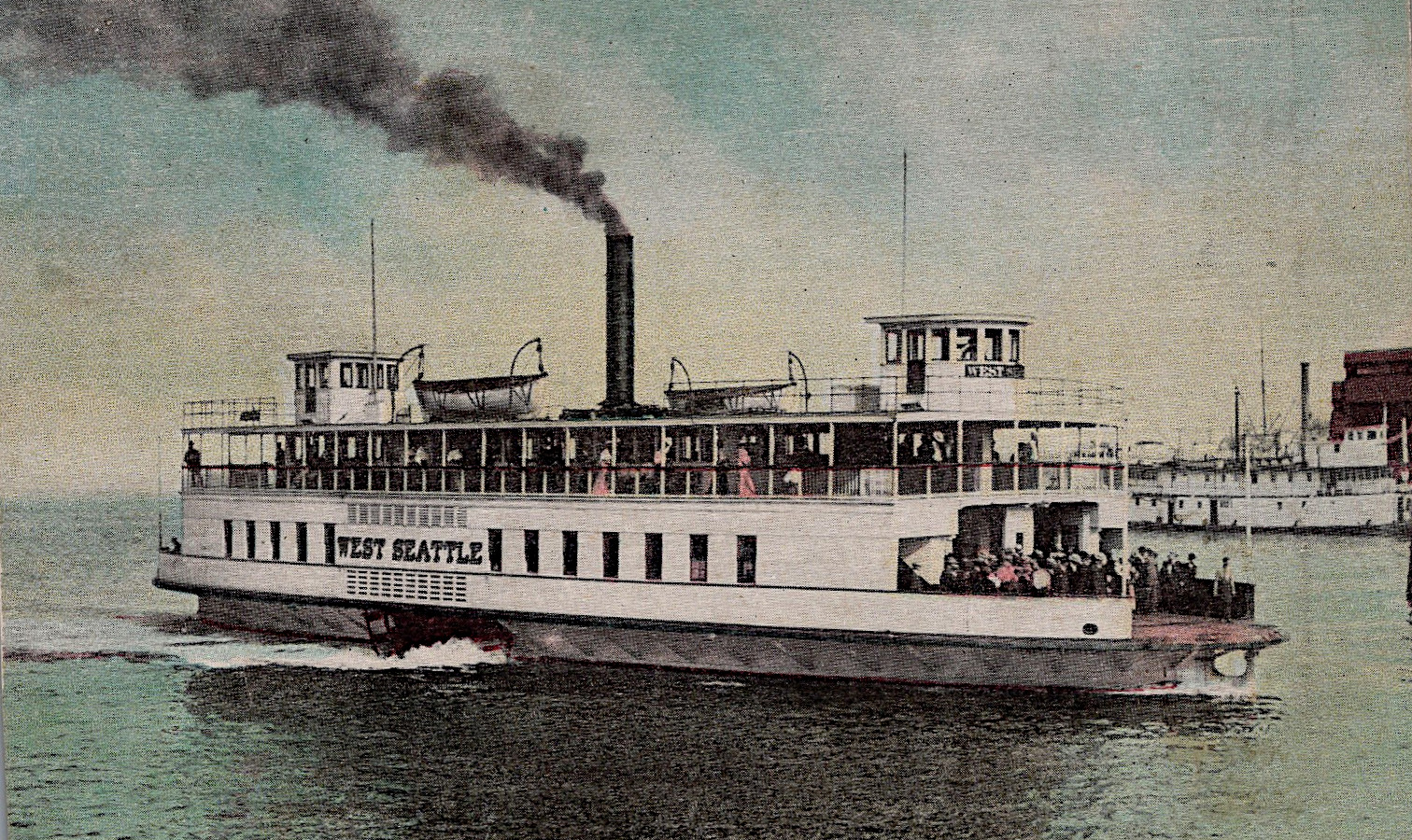
- West Seattle approaching Seattle ferry terminal, ca. 1907

History
- Name: West Seattle
- Owner: West Seattle Land & Improv. Co.; Port of Seattle; King County; Lake Washington Shipyard; Treutle Marine Ways
- Operator: after 1920 : Kitsap County Trans. Co.; May to September, 1921 : Pierce County, Washington
- In service: 1907
- Identification: US registry #203946
- Fate: Abandoned
- Notes: Converted to barge.

General characteristics
- Type: steam ferry
- Tonnage: 773 gross; 487 regist.
- Length: 140 ft (42.67 m)
- Beam: 48.6 ft (14.81 m) over guards
- Depth: 8.6 ft (2.62 m) depth of hold
- Installed power: steam engine
- Propulsion: sidewheels
- Capacity: Approximately 1,000 passengers.

West Seattle was a side-wheel driven steam-powered ferry built in 1907.

== Design and construction ==
West Seattle was built in 1907 at Tacoma, Washington at the E. W. Heath shipyard for the West Seattle Land and Improvement Company. Her engine was built by the Heffernan Engine Works. The vessel was intended to augment the company's ferry service, then being handled by the smaller ferry City of Seattle across Elliott Bay from Seattle to West Seattle, where the company was engaged in real estate development.

== Career ==
The West Seattle, which was built at Tacoma and entered regular service on June 27, 1907, on the Seattle – West Seattle route. City of Seattle was then shifted to run to the Luna amusement park then located at Duwamish Head. 1907 was the peak year for ferry transport on the Seattle-West Seattle run, with 103,000 passengers carried in July alone. After that, rising competition from the expanding network of street car lines over time proved too much for the West Seattle ferries, and City of Seattle was taken off the route in 1911. West Seattle was kept on the run, and in June 1913, the money-losing ferry was sold to the Port of Seattle.

The Port of Seattle operated the ferry until September 22, 1919, when the Port donated the ferry to King County. King County was unable to make a profit from the vessel. King County attempted to be used on the Seattle – Tacoma route, but there was insufficient interest. In 1920, King County replaced West Seattle on the Elliott Bay route with the small Lake Washington steamer Aquilo. King County then leased West Seattle to the Kitsap County Transportation Company, which operated the ferry occasionally as a relief vessel on the ferry route to Vashon Island. Otherwise it kept West Seattle laid up at Houghton, on Lake Washington.

Kitsap County Transportation Co. subleased West Seattle to Pierce County from May to September 1921. Pierce County used the ferry on the Tacoma – Gig Harbor run, for which it charged 50 cents for automobiles, a fee which has been called "nominal".

West Seattle was later converted to a barge, and was used to store fish nets. The hull was still in use as an oil storage barge as late as 1951, and possibly 1960.

== See also ==
- City of Seattle (steam ferry)
- Ferries in Washington State
