= Nisqually State Park =

Washington state park

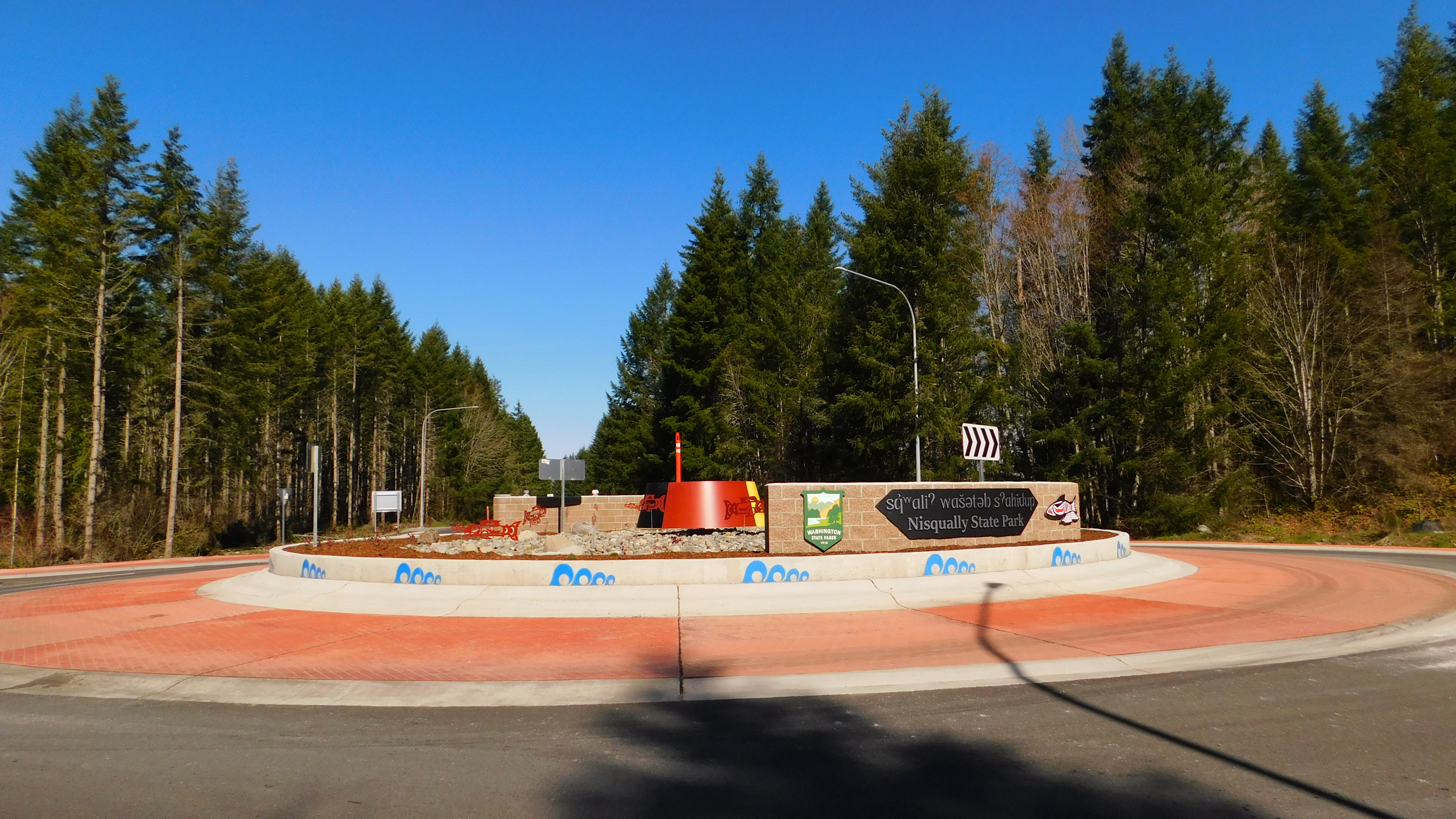
- Roundabout at park entrance, 2026

- Location within Washington (state)
- Type: State park
- Location: 43371 Mashel Prairie Road, Eatonville, Washington
- Coordinates: 46°51′47.26″N 122°19′45.79″W
- Area: 1,300 acres (530 ha)
- Opened: January 20, 2016
- Etymology: Nisqually Indian Tribe
- Administrator: Nisqually Indian Tribe, Washington State Parks and Recreation Commission
- Status: Open
- Camp sites: 60
- Hiking trails: 13.2 miles (21.2 km) (planned)
- Terrain: Plateaus, cliffs, ridges
- Water: Mashel River, Nisqually River, Ohop Creek
- Vegetation: Forest
- Species: Salal, understory
- Designation: Washington state park
- Facilities: Public bathrooms
- Website: Nisqually State Park

Nisqually State Park is a 1,300-acre (530 ha) state park near Eatonville, Washington. The park resides on lands historically associated with several indigenous groups, most notably the Nisqually Indian Tribe. As of 2026, the park is one of two in Washington state to be jointly managed by the Washington State Parks and Recreation Commission and an indigenous community.

The park was first proposed in 1987, with land purchases to create the park initially undertaken in 1991. Due to a lack of funding, the park's plan stagnated until an official master plan was adopted in 2008. Limited funding further postponed development until 2013 when additional acreage was purchased. A first phase construction effort of a trailhead facility and an official hiking path began in 2014. Nisqually State Park opened in January 2016.

The park was expanded during a second phase in the early 2020s which included the construction of several buildings, including a Coast Salish meeting hall, additional trails, and an interpretive plaza. The ongoing second phase, which included the cleanup of a town landfill, is planned to include a large campground and more than 13 miles (21 km) of trails into the forested canopy and to the confluence of the Mashel and Nisqually rivers. A roundabout was built at the park's entrance off State Route 507 and included Native American sculptures; the artworks were vandalized in December 2025.

Nisqually State Park is situated on land considered to be ancestral and historic to the Nisqually people and was the birth place of Nisqually leader, Chief Leschi. The area is the known location of the Mashel Massacre, one of the last engagements of the Puget Sound War.

== History ==
=== Indigenous history ===
The lands of Nisqually State Park were once home to several indigenous groups, including the Nisqually Indian Tribe who created a community in the area known as Mashel. (Note: Mashel is sometimes spelled as "Mashell". See sources throughout the article.) For thousands of years, creeks in the region hosted fishing camps. The land is known to be the birthplace of Chief Leschi and considered "ancestral homeland" of the Nisqually people. After the signing of the Treaty of Medicine Creek, the forests were purchased by lumber companies; after logging was completed, the lands were sold.

In March 1856, the Mashel Massacre occurred near the settlement. Considered the last engagement of the Puget Sound War, up to as many as thirty Nisqually people were killed, primarily unarmed and fleeing children, elderly, and women. The massacre was led by a state mounted rifle volunteer patrol under command of Captain Hamilton J. G. Maxon.

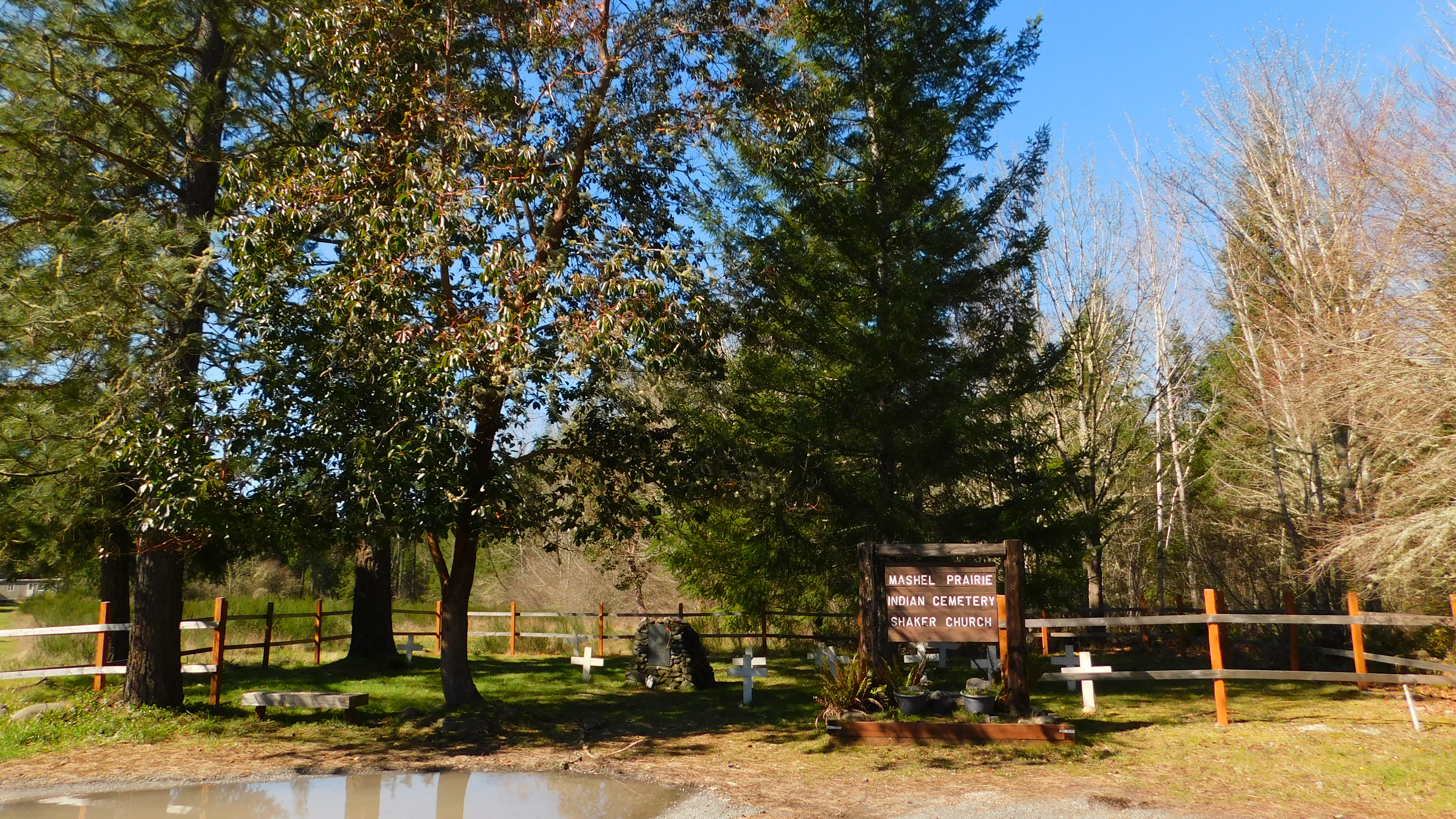
Mashel cemetery, 2026

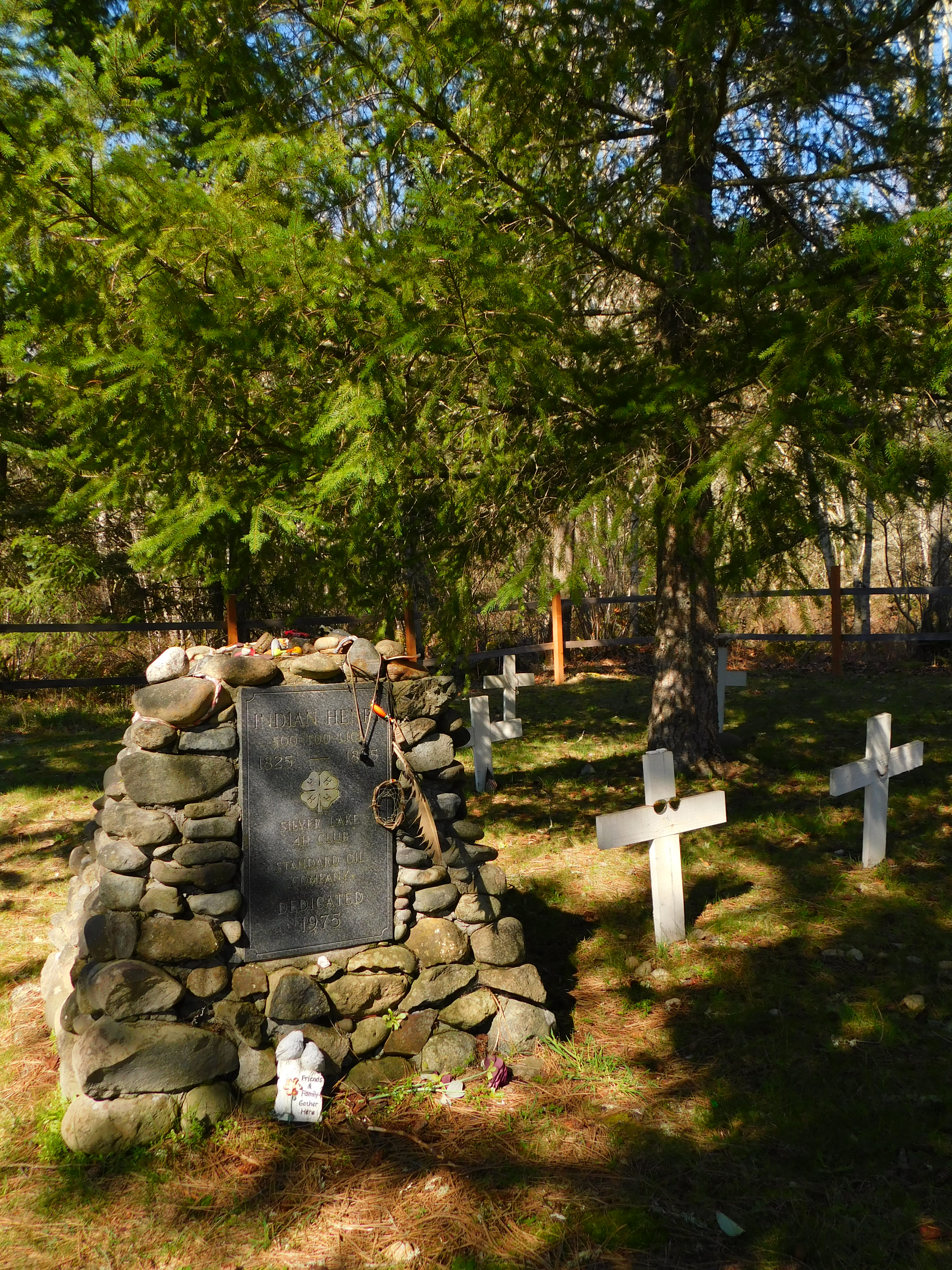
Grave of Soo-Too-Lick, "Indian Henry", 2026

=== Park beginnings ===
The first attempt to create a park in the area began by a proposal in 1987 under a directive known as the "Nisqually River management plan", approved by the Washington State Legislature; land for the park was first purchased in 1991 by the Washington State Parks and Recreation Commission (WSPRC) with funding provided by the Washington Wildlife and Recreation Program (WWRP). Attempts were made beginning in 2006 to include any indigenous tribe to the efforts; only the Nisqually tribe responded.

Due to a lack of funding, the park was not improved and access points were gated; visitors routinely circumvented the closed access points. With no official trail system, trails were often made by hikers and the area was known for high levels of garbage and vandalism.

Officially, Nisqually State Park began under a joint agreement and master plan of the Nisqually Indian Tribe and the WSPRC in 2008; the two groups were to cooperatively manage the park. A memorandum of understanding (MoU) was signed in 2014 between the two groups, and the partnership was restrengthened under another MoU signed in October 2020. The overall effort to create the park has been reported to be the first recorded instance of the WSPRC working in conjunction with a tribal community to establish a state park in Washington. However, the WSPRC had previously signed a similar agreement with the Swinomish Indian Tribal Community for the creation of the Kukutali Preserve, though the "scale and extent" of Nisqually State Park was to be "unprecedented in State Parks’ history.” (Note: The Washington State Parks department does not mention that Nisqually State Park was the first joint venture under the agency.)

Nisqually State Park was the first state park formed in Washington since 2008 (Note: Various reports mention Nisqually State Park as the first state park to open in the state since the mid-1980s. See sources throughout the article for the discrepancy.) and the first such with overnight camping since the mid-1990s. The historical site remains the first Washington state park with a campground to be cooperatively managed by the state and a tribal government.

Early names proposed for the park included Confluence State Park, Leschi State Park, and Nisqually-Mashel. Three other monikers, Lushootseed words meaning "People Bridges", "Renewal", and "The Three Waters", were also considered.

=== Construction and expansion ===
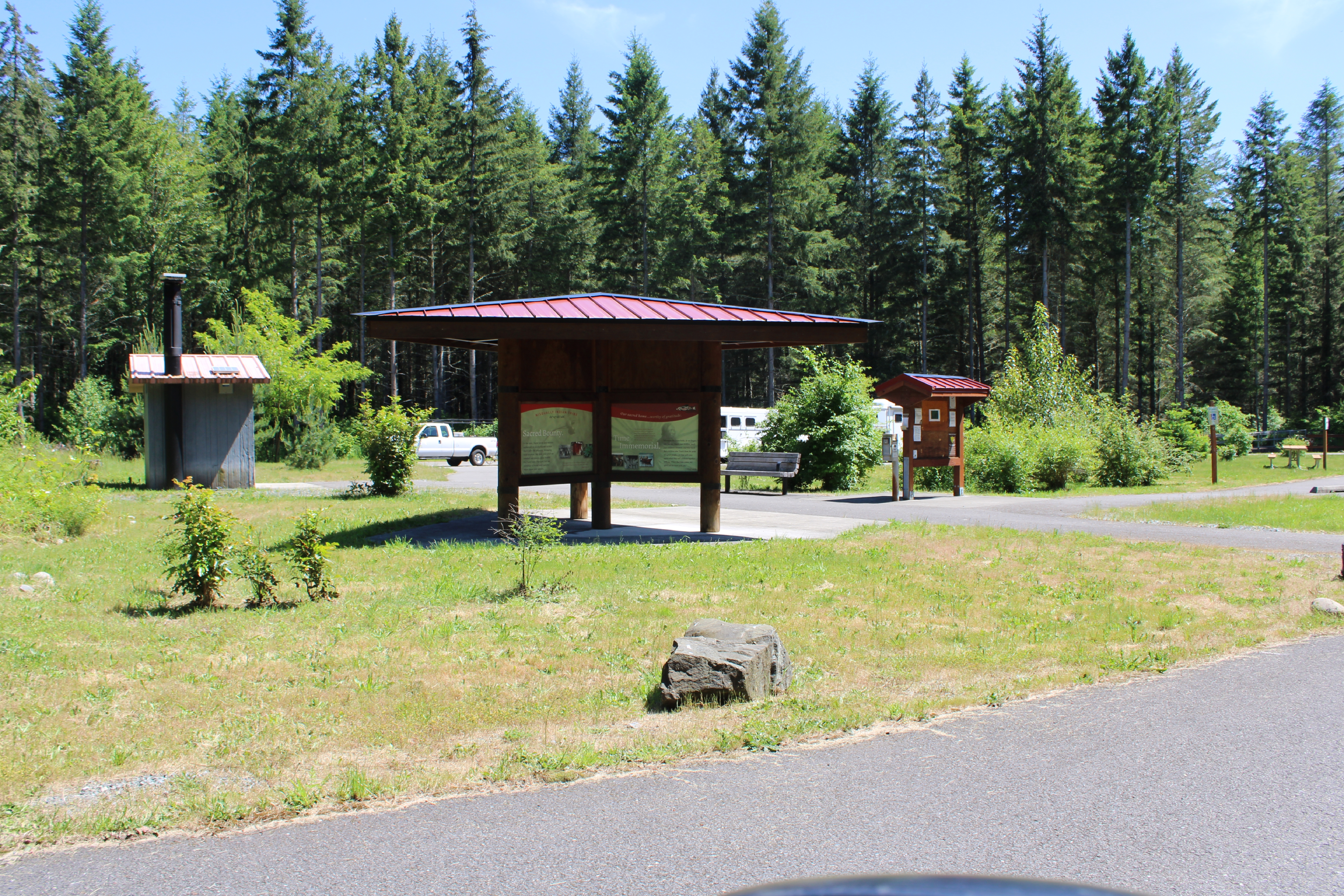
First park trailhead facilities, 2024

The first phase of the project, meant to be completed by the WSPRC's centennial in 2013, was postponed in 2009 due to budget cuts for the state parks department. The early phase of the site, which was to include a campground and dedicated horse trails, was to cost approximately $10 million.

The park grounds were expanded in 2013 under a separate land purchase, again funded by the WWRP; the 1991 and 2013 acquisitions were reported to cost a combined $6 million. As of 2026, the Nisqually tribe owns 217 acres (88 ha) of land within the boundaries of the park, which the tribe purchased in 2014. The site was first built up beginning that same year with the construction of a "trailhead facility" that featured restrooms and a parking lot.

The park was opened on January 20, 2016, following a ribbon cutting ceremony described as "staged with virtually no fanfare". Numerous local and state agencies, as well as the town and people of Eatonville, were thanked for their efforts. The WSPRC estimated that the recreation area could reach up to 480,000 annual visitors and that the site would require approximately $85 million to fully complete the park's original plan.

A second-phase expansion of the park, based on the original master plan, was estimated to cost approximately $17 million by 2019. Funding for the "second phase" project began in 2019 and 2020, with approximately $3.8 million allocated in two state capital budgets. In 2021 and 2022, an additional combined amount of $24.2 million was approved by the state legislative budget; the funding was to help start construction on several buildings and trails, as well as a park entrance roundabout. Though most grants have come from the state, the Nisqually Tribe has provided or raised funding for the park as well.

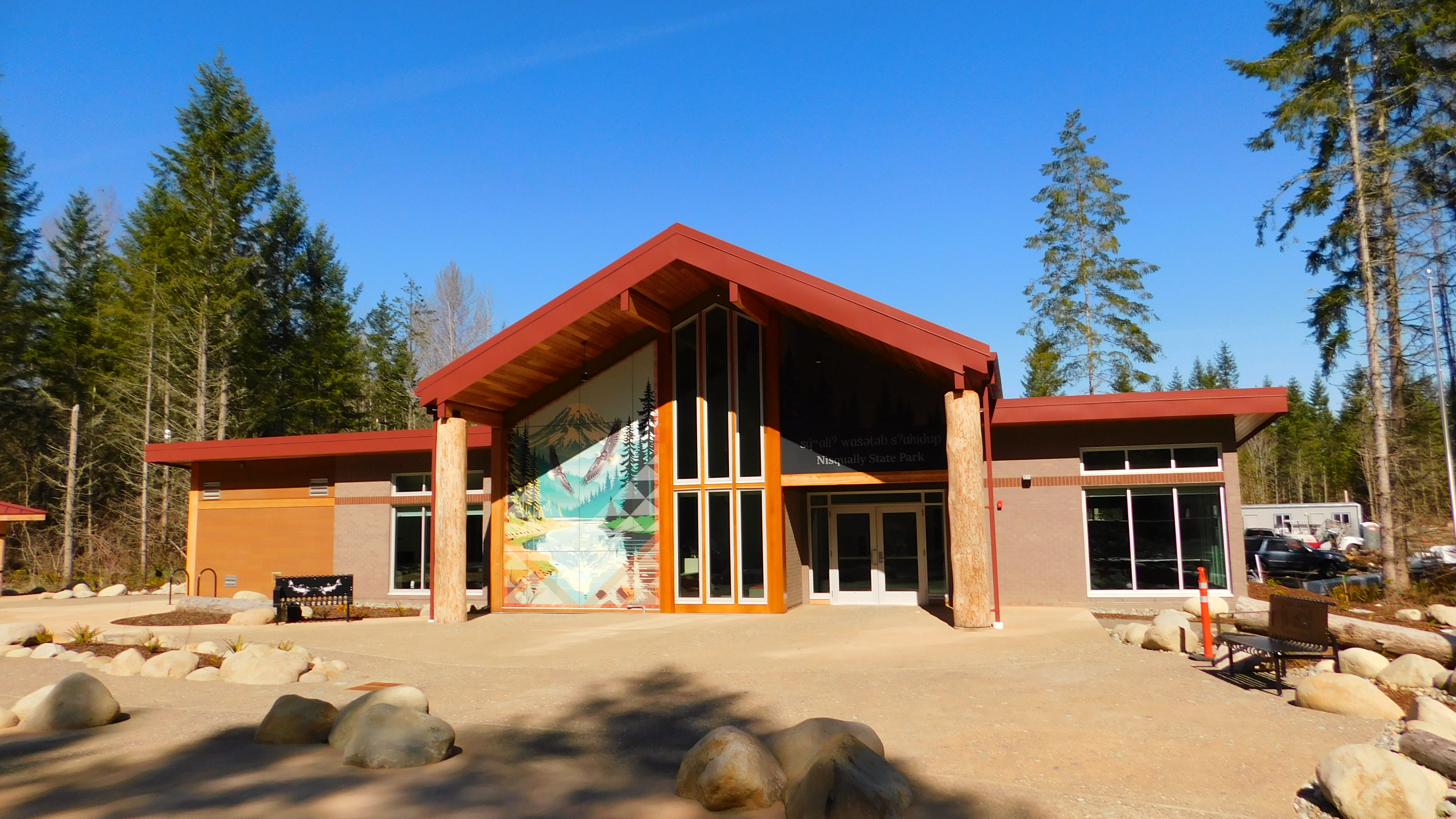
Village center, 2026

In February 2024, the tribe and the WSPRC announced an agreement to expand the amenities and recreational options of the park. The expansion, begun the same year, included camping and picnic areas, a communal space and amphitheater, administrative buildings, and an open plaza with interpretive displays. (Note: The community hall was first proposed and described as a Coast Salish meeting hall. The entire site, described as a village center, was meant to be located at the parking lot of the original trailhead facility.) Additionally, the installation of artworks created by Nisqually artists and the construction of a new hiking path, the Nisqually Ohop Trail, were also planned to be part of the project. The park was closed in early 2025, planned to last until autumn of that year, for the beginning efforts of the second phase, which included the construction of the trail system and the interpretive plaza.

During the evening of December 31, 2025, four sculptures of Native Americans located in the park entrance roundabout were vandalized. Either "broken off" or "knocked entirely from their bases", the 14 foot (4.3 m)-tall artworks had been installed two months prior. The damaged pieces were removed by the WSPRC and stored for future consideration. Early views by members and elders of the Nisqually Tribe deemed the destruction as a potential hate crime.

== Geography ==
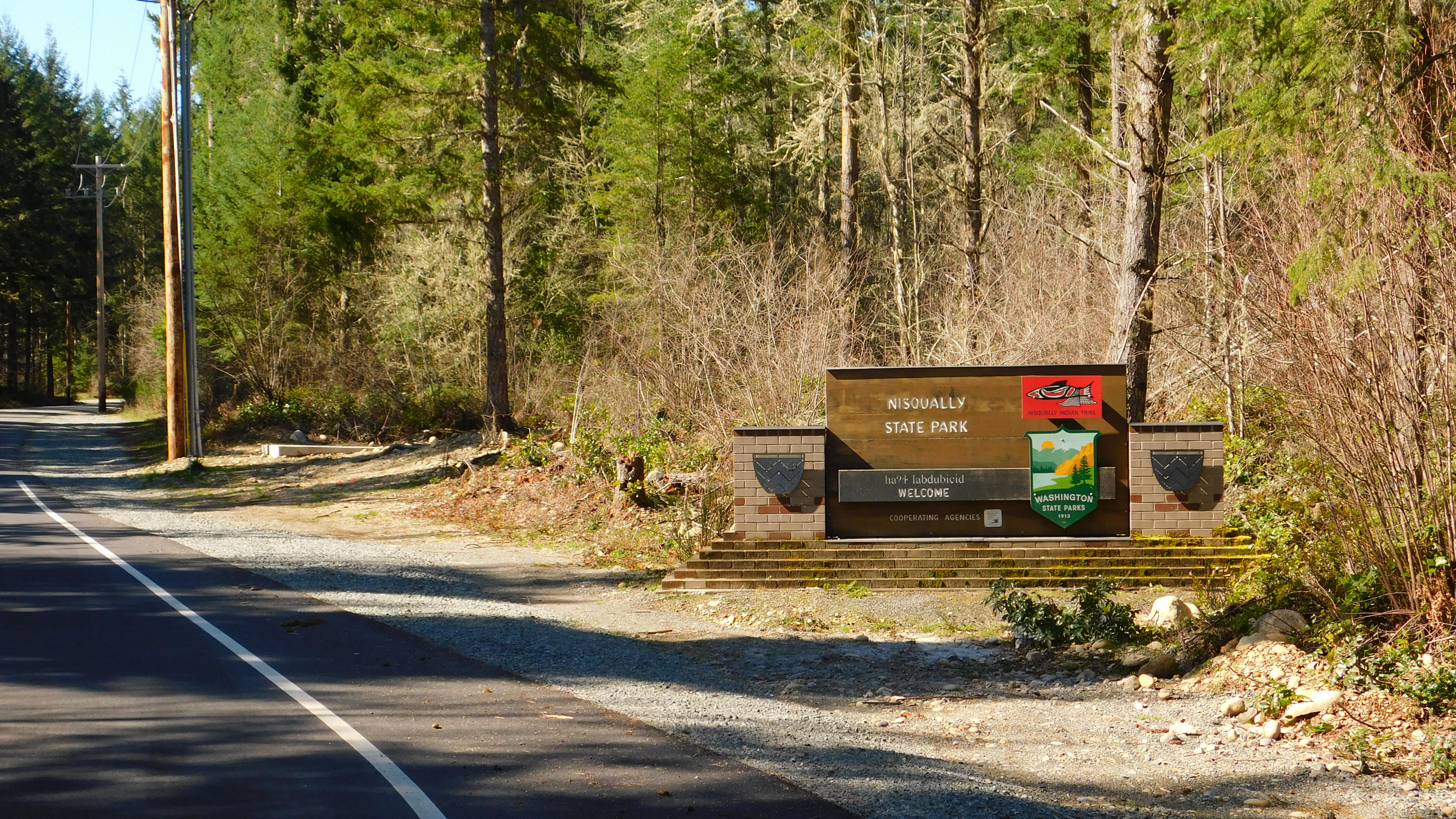
Entrance sign, 2026

The park is located among the foothills of Mount Rainier at the junction of the Mashel and Nisqually rivers, which includes a confluence with Ohop Creek. The recreation site is situated off State Route 507, approximately 3 miles (4.8 km) west of Eatonville; (Note: The park is often listed to be located roughly 7 miles (11 km) west of Eatonville. See sources throughout the article for the discrepancy.) most of the park is within the boundaries of Pierce County but a small portion is situated in Thurston County.

The site is reported to be up to 1,300 acres (530 ha) in size; (Note: The size of the park varies. Reporting in the 2020s mention the park to be only 1,200 acres (490 ha). See sourcing throughout the article for the discrepancy.) the Nisqually tribe owns 217 acres (88 ha) of land within the boundaries of the park.. The park includes forested plateaus and valleys featuring steep cliffs and ridges. As of 2022, the park is surrounded by other protected lands, including 549 acres (222 ha) under ownership of the Nisqually Land Trust, the UW Pack Experimental Forest, which encompasses approximately 4,300 acres (1,700 ha), and additional Nisqually tribal lands.

== Ecology and environment ==
The forested site contains salal and numerous species in the understory. The rivers within the park are known to be an important habitat for salmon.

Historically, indigenous people were able to fish for steelhead trout during the winter season, but the species was functionally extinct in the watershed by the time Nisqually State Park was being planned. Restoration efforts in the early 2020s included the improvement of the park's riparian and wetland habitats, which involved the planting of native vegetation. Increased staffing has decreased the levels of vandalism and improper campsites, further helping to rejuvenate the ecosystem.

=== Eatonville Landfill ===
The park contained a landfill owned and operated by the town of Eatonville. The 2-acre (0.81 ha) waste site, in operation from the 1950s into the 1980s, was originally on land owned by Weyerhaeuser and leased to the town. Initial attempts to clean up the Eatonville Landfill was begun in 2021 under a $7.4 million fund from the Washington State Department of Ecology; the grant was authorized under the Model Toxics Control Act. The city and Weyerhaeuser split the remaining $14 million cost. Removal of debris began in early 2025 culminating with the extraction of 30,000 cubic yards (23,000 m^{3}) of waste. An additional 10,000 metric tons (10,000 t) had been removed by the end of the year. The Nisqually Indian Tribe, Eatonville, the Washington State Parks Department, and Weyerhaeuser cooperated in the project. The lumber company planned to donate the landfill grounds to the parks department once the cleanup was declared as completed.

The landfill intruded upon wetland areas, polluting the soil. Petroleum contamination was a specific concern; the soils were left undisturbed during the mitigation project as to allow the natural degradation of contaminants to occur. By 2025, the landfill removal was considered to be in the seventh stage of a nine-stage clean up project. The final two steps require a 10-year observation of the site. If the mitigation is deemed successful by 2036, the state would remove the site from a Suspected and Contaminated Sites List. Trees and other vegetation are planned to be planted at the landfill.

== Features ==
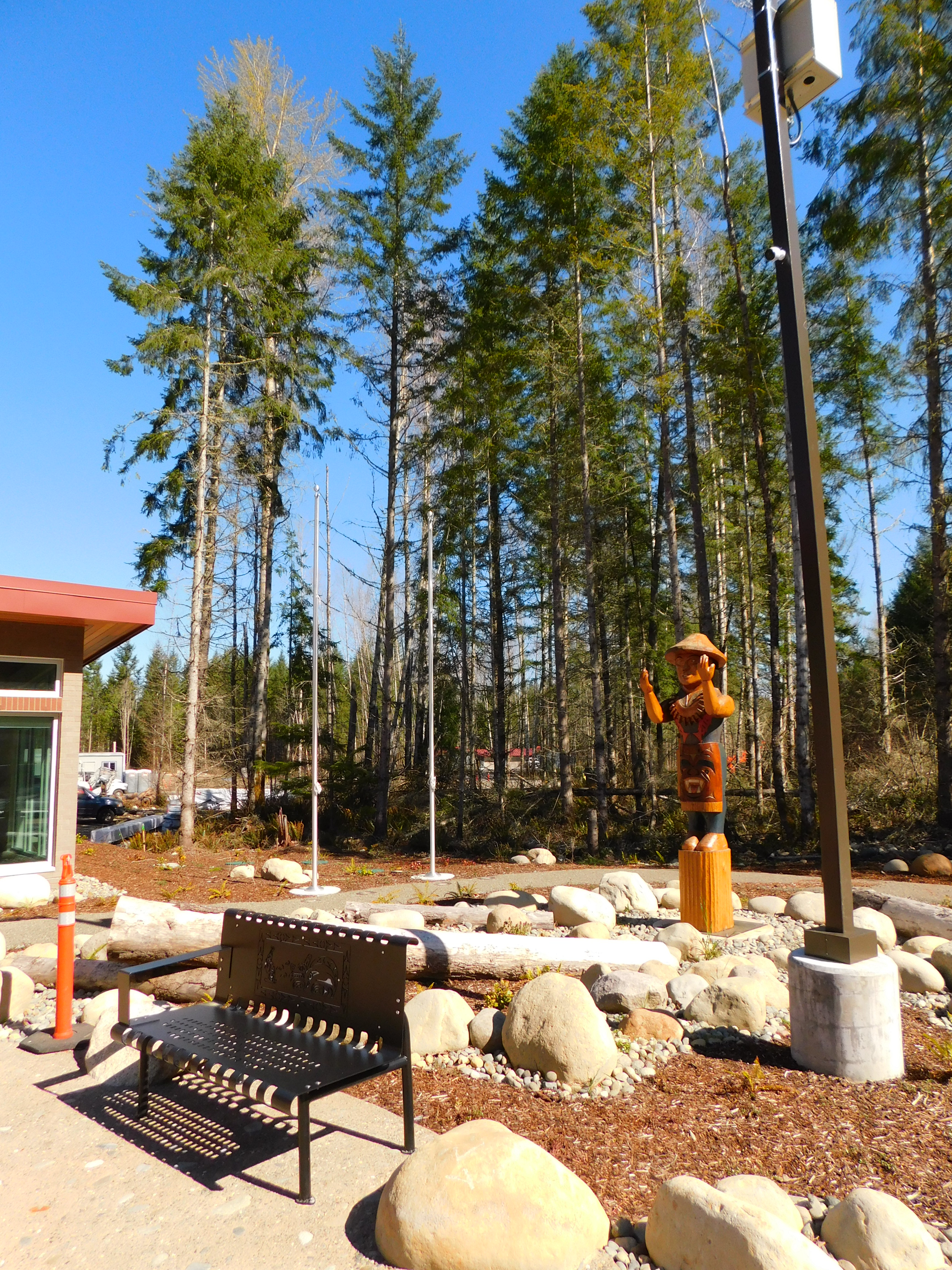
Village center grounds, 2026

The park features a trailhead parking lot with restrooms. Trails for horse riding exist within undeveloped portions of the park.

== Future plans ==
The park's trail system, planned to be up to 13.2 miles (21.2 km) in combined length, is proposed under the original master plan to include an expansion into the UW Pack Experimental Forest potentially by the early 2030s. The trails throughout the park are proposed to be named after indigenous words for flora and fauna native to the area; the effort is to be undertaken by local schoolchildren.

The 60-spot campground is planned to feature sites for RVs and tents. Camps for equestrians and hikers are also included. The grounds will contain cabins, some with or without plumbing. The campground is planned to expand up to 150 sites.

The park is planned to be part of the proposed Nisqually River Water Trail, a water trail to be located on the Nisqually River. The pathway would extend from the park to Luhr Beach at the Billy Frank Jr. Nisqually National Wildlife Refuge and Nisqually Delta.
