= Squaxin Island Tribe =

Native American tribe in Washington, United States

Squaxin Island Indian Reservation sqʷax̌sədəbš (Lushootseed)
- Indian Reservation
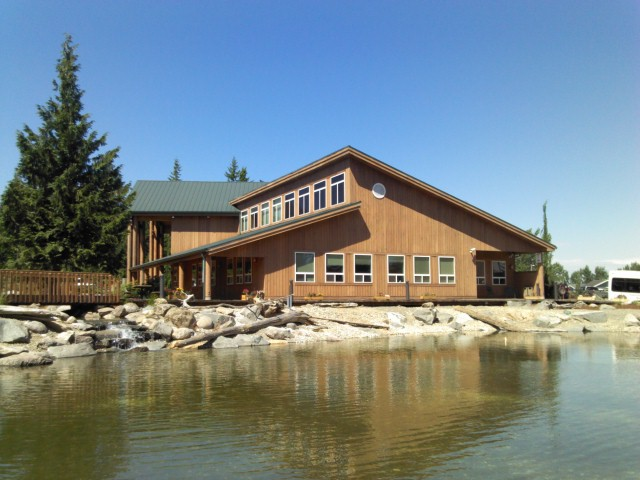
- South view of the Squaxin Island Tribal Center in Kamilche.
- Nickname: People of the Water
- Location of Squaxin Island Indian Reservation in Washington State
- Coordinates: 47°12′N 122°55′W
- Country: United States
- State: Washington
- County: Mason
- Negotiated: December 26, 1854

Government
  - Type: Tribal Council
  - Chairman: Kris Peters
  - Vice Chairman: Taylor Krise
  - Secretary: Jim Peters
  - Treasurer: Joshua Whitener
  - Council: Cameron Henry; Greg Lehman; Tyler Johns
- Elevation: 207 ft (63 m)

Population (2020)
  - Total: 509
- Time zone: UTC−8 (Pacific (PST))
  - Summer (DST): UTC−7 (PDT)
- ZIP Code: 98584
- Area code(s): 360, 564
- Website: www.squaxinisland.org

The Squaxin Island Tribe (Lushootseed: sqʷax̌sədəbš) is a federally recognized tribe located in Mason County, Washington. They are descended from several Southern Coast Salish peoples, including the Squaxin, Sahewamish, T'Peeksin, Squiaitl, Stechass, and Nusechatl.

Historically, the ancestors of the Squaxin Island Tribe inhabited several inlets of the South Puget Sound. The Reservation was created in 1854 by the Treaty of Medicine Creek, comprising the entirety of Squaxin Island. Today, the reservation also includes several small parcels in the nearby area. Tribal members no longer reside on Squaxin Island itself, but 509 residents live on other Reservation and Off-Reservation Trust Land. Total tribal membership was at 1,022 as of 2010.

== History ==
The Coast Salish clans that became the Squaxin Island Tribe were historically settled along the seven inlets of the South Puget Sound. These were known as the S'hotl-Ma-Mish (Carr Inlet), Noo-Seh-Chatl (Henderson Inlet), Steh-Chass (Budd Inlet, around modern-day Olympia), Squi-Aitl (Eld Inlet), T'Peeksin (Totten Inlet), Sa-Heh-Wa-Mish (Hammersley Inlet), and Squaksin (Case Inlet; which gave the reservation its name). They were speakers of a dialect continuum in the Salishan language family known as Lushootseed. Together with the Twana and Suquamish, they numbered about 1,000 in 1780. Unlike other peoples of the region, the Squaxin tribes were not dependent on a river system, as the Tumwater Falls blocked salmon from migrating far upstream. Instead, they were oriented towards the saltwater sound and the smaller watersheds directly adjacent to the seven inlets. Extended families lived together in longhouses laid out in villages, and were connected by family ties into a wide system of alliances. The Qwu?gwes site was used as a food processing camp by a nearby Squi-Aitl village for around 700 years. The site shows evidence of the large-scale harvesting of salmon and shellfish. Squaxin traded along routes stretching overland to the Columbia Basin and by sea throughout the Puget Sound.

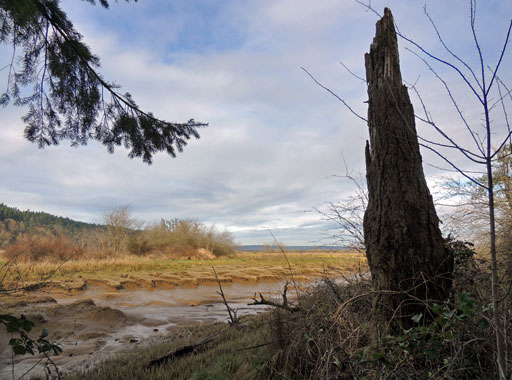
The remains of the treaty tree where the Medicine Creek Treaty was signed, surrendering Squaxin mainland possessions.

After decades of trade and intermittent contact, serious white settlement in South Puget Sound began in the 1840s and 50s. In 1853, the Washington Territory was created and included Squaxin lands. In 1854, the newly appointed Territorial Governor Isaac Stevens began to pressure the tribes into treaties ceding their land to the United States. The Squaxin tribes were among the first targeted, and signed the Medicine Creek Treaty on December 26. The treaty surrendered all Squaxin mainland claims in exchange for Squaxin Island, twenty years of cash payments, and recognition of traditional native fishing and hunting rights. The reservations proved far less valuable than the land that had been given up. When the Nisqually realized how poor of a deal they had been given, their Chief Leschi began the Puget Sound War in an attempt to reverse the treaty. Despite not taking up arms, the Squaxin Tribe was forcefully interned on their reservation during the war. The small, forested island provided poor sustenance for the 375 Squaxin tribe members. After the war, most families left the island and returned to living around the South Puget Sound, but without rights to the land.

Initially, the federal government honored its treaties with the tribes, but with increasing numbers of white settlers moving into the area, the settlers began to infringe upon the fishing rights of the native tribes. By 1883, whites had established more than forty salmon canneries. In 1894, there were three canneries in the Puget Sound area; by 1905, there were twenty-four. The whites also began to use new techniques, which prevented a significant portion of the salmon from reaching the tribal fishing areas. When Washington Territory became a state in 1889, the legislature passed "laws to curtail tribal fishing in the name of 'conservation' but what some scholars described as being designed to protect white fisheries." (Note: Scholars included law professors such as Michael C. Blumm of Lewis & Clark Law School and Brett M. Swift of the University of Colorado School of Law.) The state legislature, by 1897, had banned the use of weirs, which were customarily used by Indigenous fishermen.

During the 1960s and 70s, Indians in Washington States were inspired by the ongoing Civil Rights Movement to demand that Washington State honor its treaty obligations. Through civil disobedience and demonstrations, Native activists such as Billy Frank, Jr. tried to assert their right to fish. In 1970, the US Attorney General finally filed suit against the state, and the Squaxin Island Tribe was one of the tribes called on to provide expert witnesses. In the famous Boldt decision, the US District Court recognized the tribes' original right to fish, and the decision was upheld on appeal to the Supreme Court. Since the decision, the Squaxin Island Tribe has become one of the tribal co-managers of the state's fisheries, and many tribal members get their income from the annual salmon catch.

The Squaxin Island Tribe was one of the first Native American tribes in the U.S. to enter into the Self Governance Demonstration Project with the federal government.

== Culture and religion ==
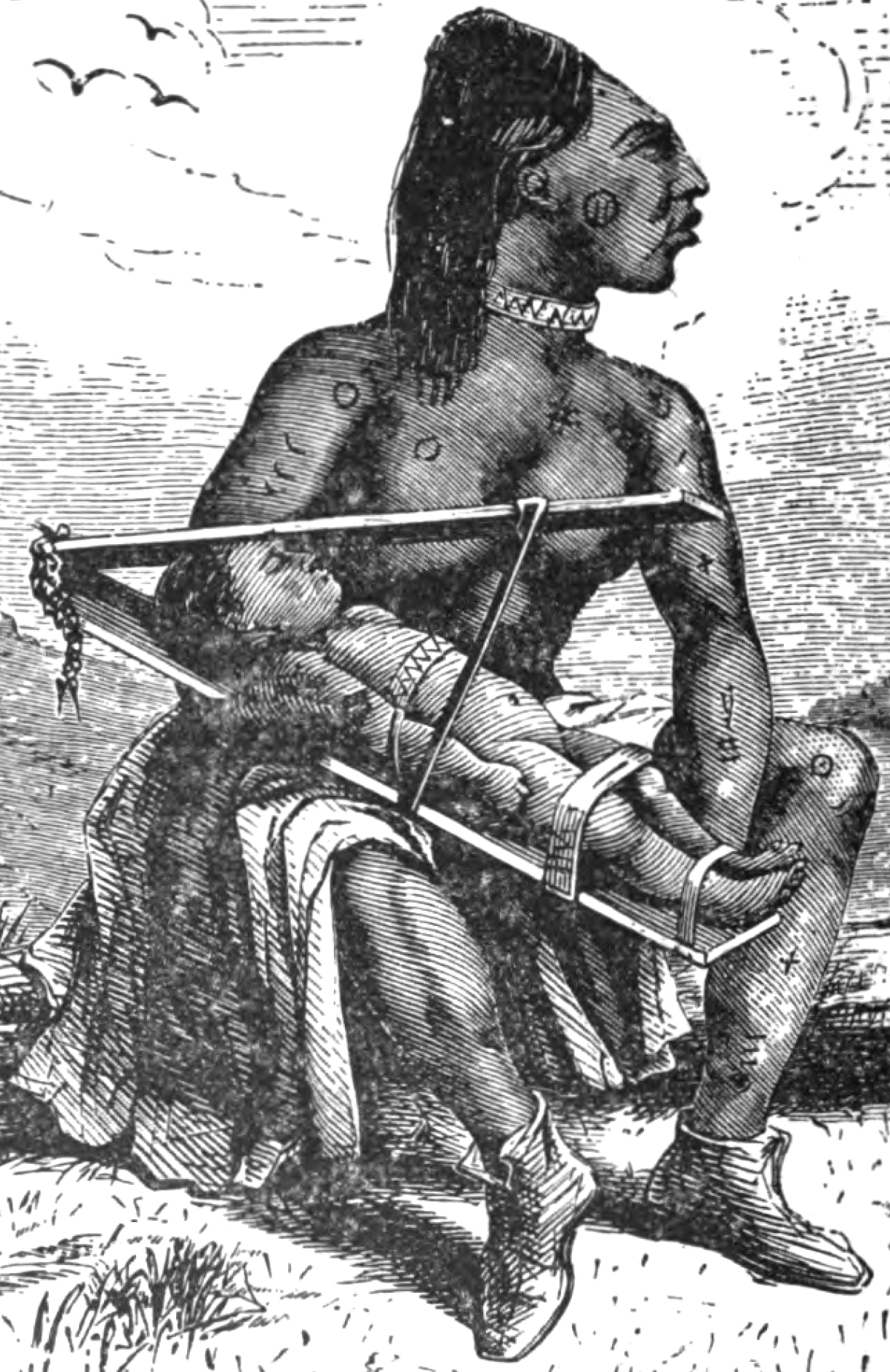
Head flattening was a cosmetic practice done by many tribes in the pacific northwest, including the Squaxin.

Storytelling was done through songs, which were accompanied with dances done to the beat of a drum. Other importance practices included the carving of cedar canoes, the weaving of baskets and fishing nets, and face-painting done with red and black hues made from ground-up rocks. Like the other peoples of the coastal northwest, upper-class Squaxin engaged in head-flattening, where infants had their foreheads compressed in a lateral direction.

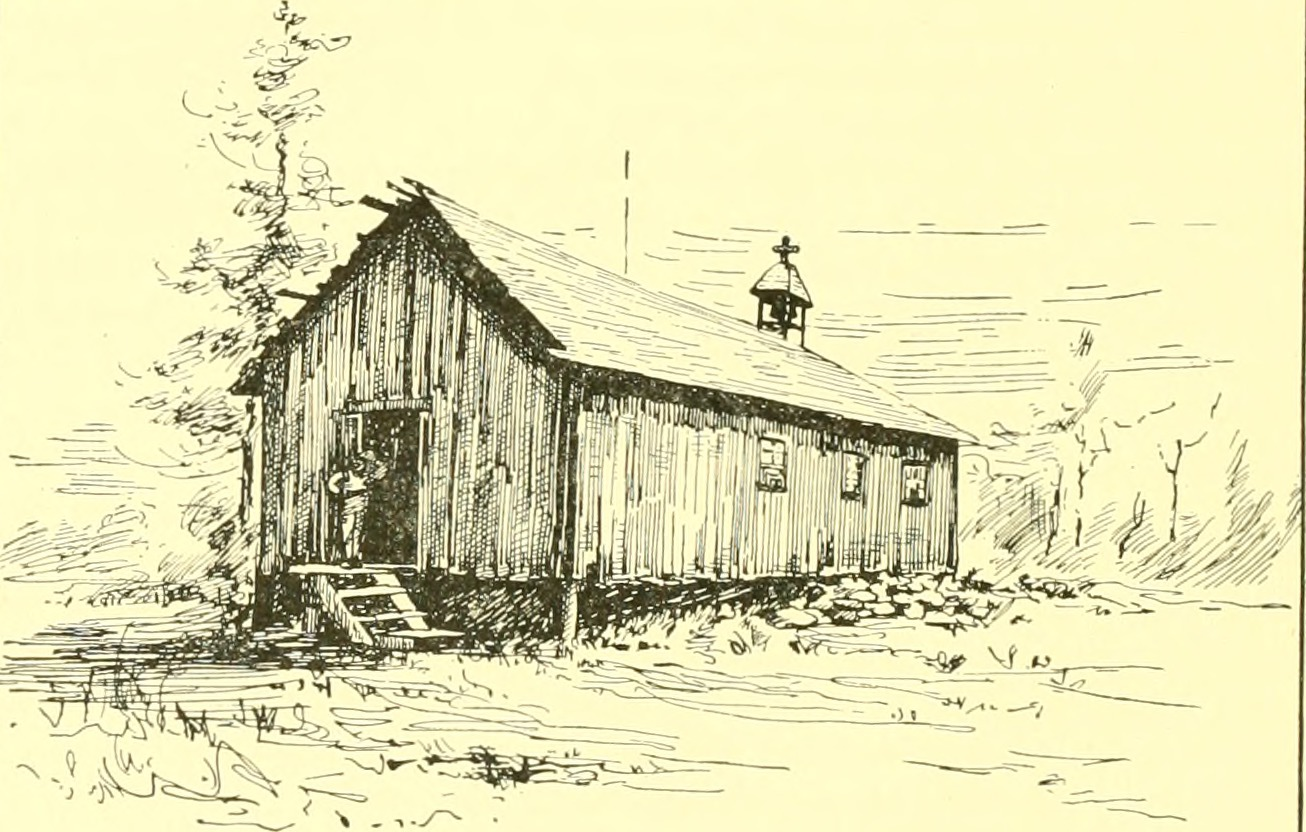
The first Indian Shaker Church at Mud Bay, Eld Inlet, Washington State, circa 1892

Traditional Squaxin religious beliefs were similar to those of other tribes in the Pacific Northwest, and involved shamanism. For several decades after the Puget Sound War, many Squaxins continued to practice these traditional beliefs. A new religious movement began in 1882 when Squaxin John Slocum founded the Indian Shaker Church after a near-death experience. Blending Catholic, Protestant, and indigenous religious elements, the church emphasized personal communication with God over written texts. The movement quickly spread throughout the Pacific Northwest. Native American religious movements were suppressed after the Battle of Wounded Knee, and Indian Shakers faced persecution from the Federal Government. Nonetheless, by the end of the twentieth century there were still more than 2,000 adherents. Today, most Squaxins consider themselves Protestant.

== Present-day tribe ==
As of 2010, the Squaxin tribe had 1,022 registered members, up from 302 in 1984. The 2020 census showed 509 residents living on tribal lands (reservation and trust), up from 445 in 2000. The majority of these residents consider themselves Native American alone (281) or of mixed race (126).

=== Reservation and Trust Lands ===
In recent years, the Squaxin Island Indian Reservation has acquired more land in and around their older holdings. In the 1970s they acquired land in Kamilche where many of tribal members live, placing it under trust with the Department of the Interior. The tribe pressured the 31-acre Squaxin Island State Park into closing in the 1990s, and in 2015 purchased the property. In December 2021, Squaxin Island Tribe came to an agreement with Port Blakely Companies, a family owned timber company, to reacquire 1,000 acres of the tribe's ancestral land. Two miles of waterfront and 125 acres of tidelands on Little Skookum Inlet in Mason County were returned to the tribe, free of charge. The return of the shoreline restored the tribe's direct access to Puget Sound, and some of the most productive shellfish beds in the region. In a separate transaction, the tribe purchased 875 acres of upland forest for an undisclosed sum. The so-called Kamilche property was acquired by Port Blakely following the signing of the 1854 Medicine Creek Treaty 167 years prior. Tribal chairman Kris Peters said the tribe has no plans to develop the property. The land will be used for nature conservation and ceremonial purposes.

Overall, the Squaxin Tribe owns 26.13 acres (105,700 m^{2}) in Kamilche, two parcels of off-reservation trust land near Kamilche, as well as a plot of 6.03 acres (24,400 m^{2}) across Pickering Passage from Squaxin Island and a plot of 35.93 acres (145,400 m^{2}) on Harstine Island, across Peale Passage. The total land area including off-reservation trust lands is 6.942 km^{2} (2.68 sq mi, or 1,715.46 acres).

=== Museum ===
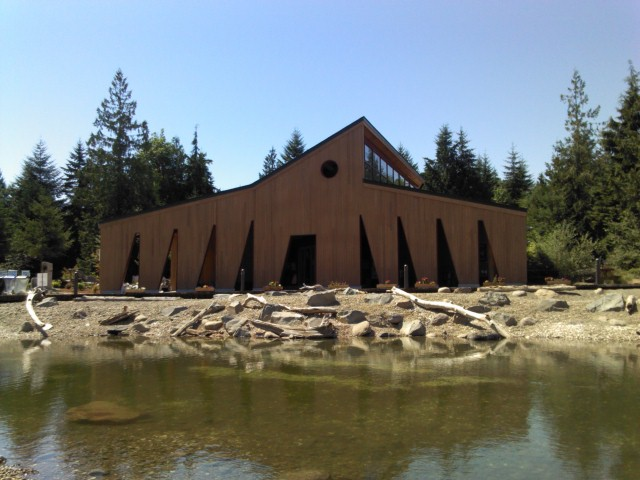
The Home of Sacred Belongings - Squaxin Island Museum Library and Research Center

Construction began on the Squaxin Island Museum, Library and Research Center (MLRC) in 1999 and it was opened in 2002. Built to educate both Squaxins and visitors on the culture of the Squaxin people, the structure was shaped to resemble Thunderbird in profile. The property the museum and cultural center stands on was gifted to the tribe by the Taylor family of nearby Taylor Shellfish. The MLRC offers guided tours, cultural classes, and numerous exhibits, among other activities.

=== Paddle to Squaxin Island 2012 ===
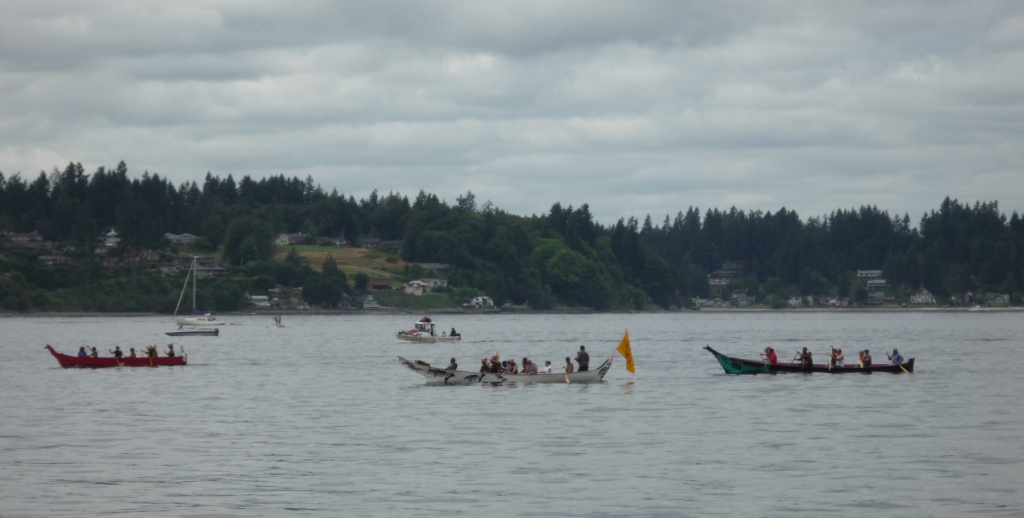
Canoes arriving in Olympia during the paddle to Squaxin 2012 event.

In 2012, the Squaxin Island Tribe was chosen to host the annual Tribal Canoe Journey. The Journeys are annual events organized by the indigenous peoples of the Pacific Northwest to revive traditional techniques of timber harvesting, making large, ocean-going canoes, and teaching canoe skills to new generations. An estimated 40,000 people attended or visited the "Paddle to Squaxin Island" journey, hosted by the Squaxin Museum and The Evergreen State College, and funded by a National Endowment for the Arts "Our Town" grant. Protocol and dining were held in an old baseball field. The quiet community was loud for a whole week. Months before the event, major construction was done. Many parking lots were made, a campground was built and a Reflecting Pond was put in the Tribal Government Campus. A total of 102 canoes landed on Squaxin for the "Paddle to Squaxin Island" journey.

=== Economic activity ===
Fishing and lumber are major industries. The tribe operates Salish Cliffs Golf, the Skookum Creek Tobacco Company, and the Little Creek Casino and Resort. Adjacent to the casino is "Elevation", which became the first tribally owned legal cannabis retail store in the United States in November, 2015.
