= List of Indian Shaker Church buildings in Washington =

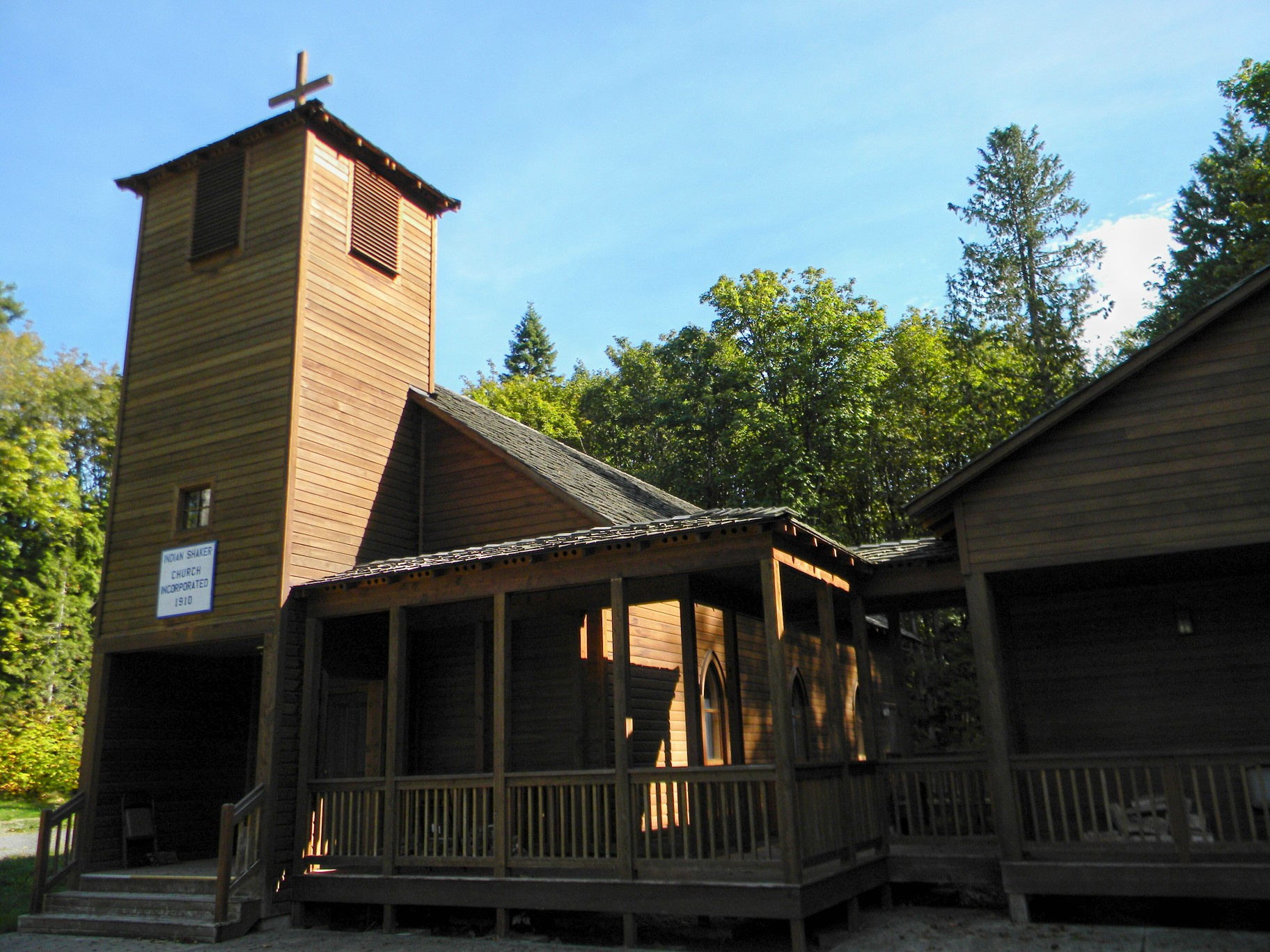
The Indian Shaker Church on the Tulalip Reservation in Snohomish County, one of the last built, as it appeared in 2013

This is a list of Indian Shaker Church buildings in Washington state. Indian Shaker Church building architecture is unique to the Pacific Northwest, with unadorned, unpainted rectangular wooden structure.

The list is derived from Washington Secretary of State archives unless noted.

- Malott
- Muckleshoot Indian Reservation—(Auburn)
- Mud Bay — Mud Bay Indian Shaker Church was the first Shaker Church
- Neah Bay
- Nespelem – burned in 2026 Kaiser Canyon Fire
- Nisqually State Park
- Nooksack
- Oakville
- Queets
- Skokomish; new church house built 1962
- Swinomish Reservation
- Taholah
- Tulalip Indian Reservation—(Marysville): Indian Shaker Church (Marysville, Washington)
- Wapato
- White Swan — Independent Shaker Church of White Swan
- Yakama Indian Reservation—Satus

== Mud Bay church ==
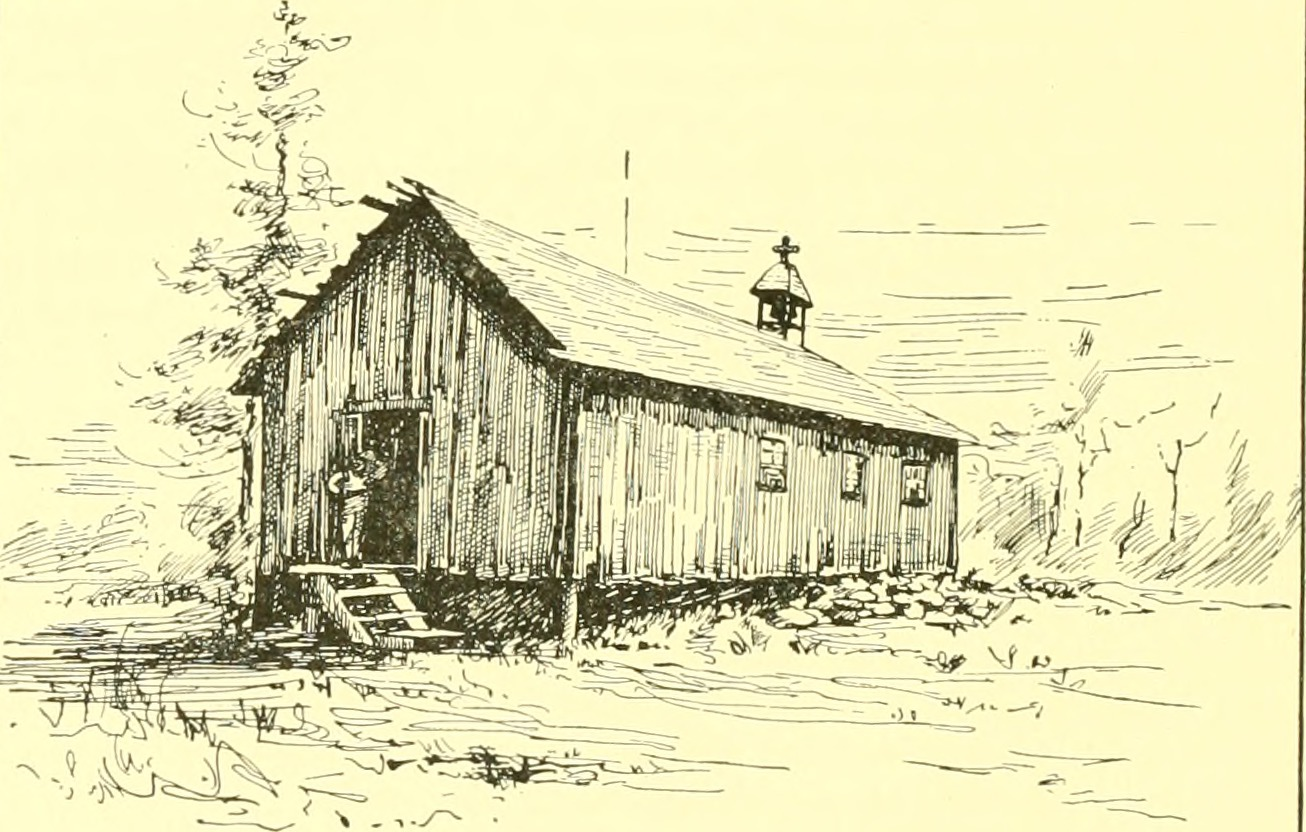
The first Indian Shaker Church at Mud Bay, Eld Inlet, Washington State, circa 1892

The first Shaker Indian church, also called the "mother church", was built above Mud Bay near Olympia, Washington, near the homes of the co-founders of the church.

The original about 18-by-24-foot (5.5 m × 7.3 m) church was oriented in an east-west direction, in a manner that would set the pattern for subsequent church architecture.
