= Mud Bay Indian Shaker Church =

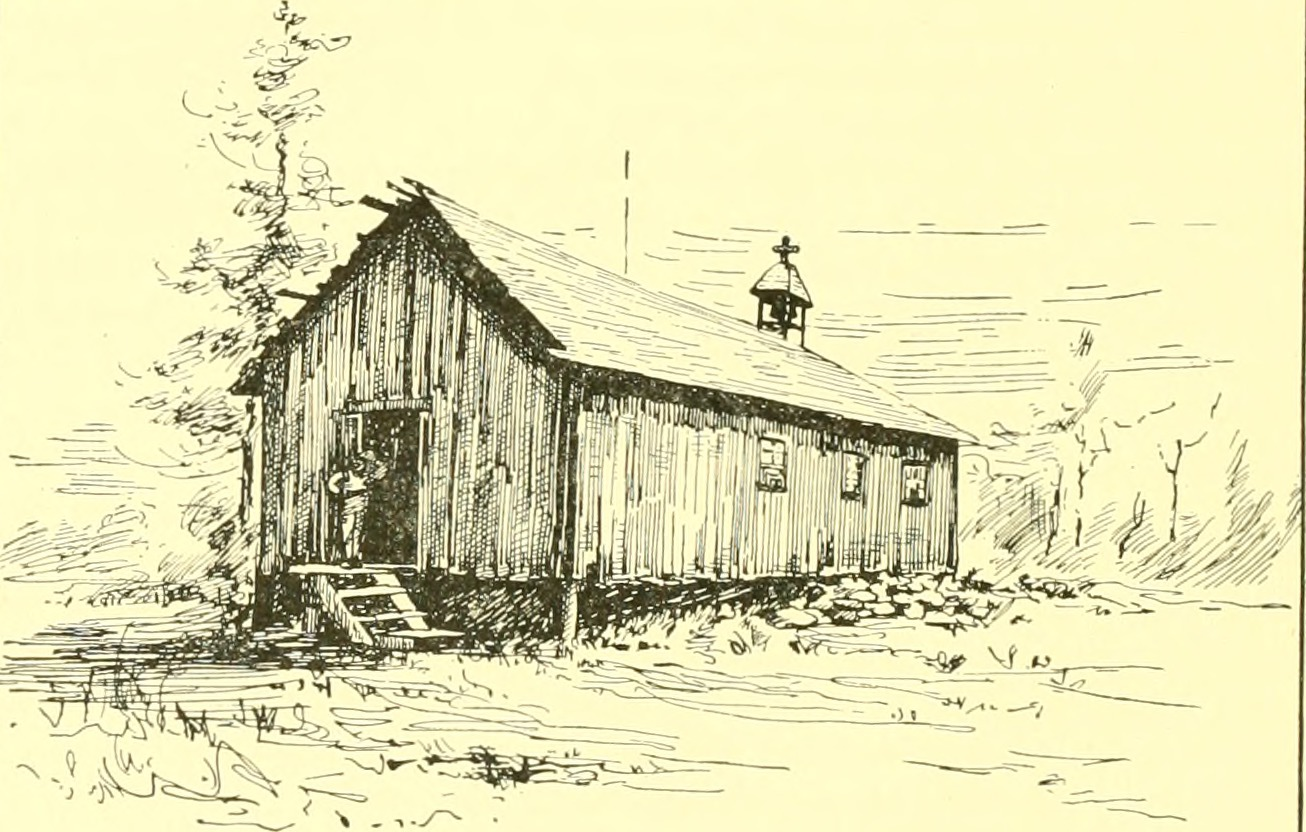
- 1896 drawing of the church building

Religion
- Affiliation: Indian Shaker Church
- District: Thurston

Location
- Municipality: Mud Bay near Olympia
- State: Washington
- Country: United States
- Interactive map of Mud Bay Indian Shaker Church
- Coordinates: 47.0606°N 123.0170°W

Architecture
- Completed: c. 1885, rebuilt in 1910

Specifications
- Length: 24-foot (7.3 m)
- Width: 18-foot (5.5 m)
- Materials: Unfinished wood

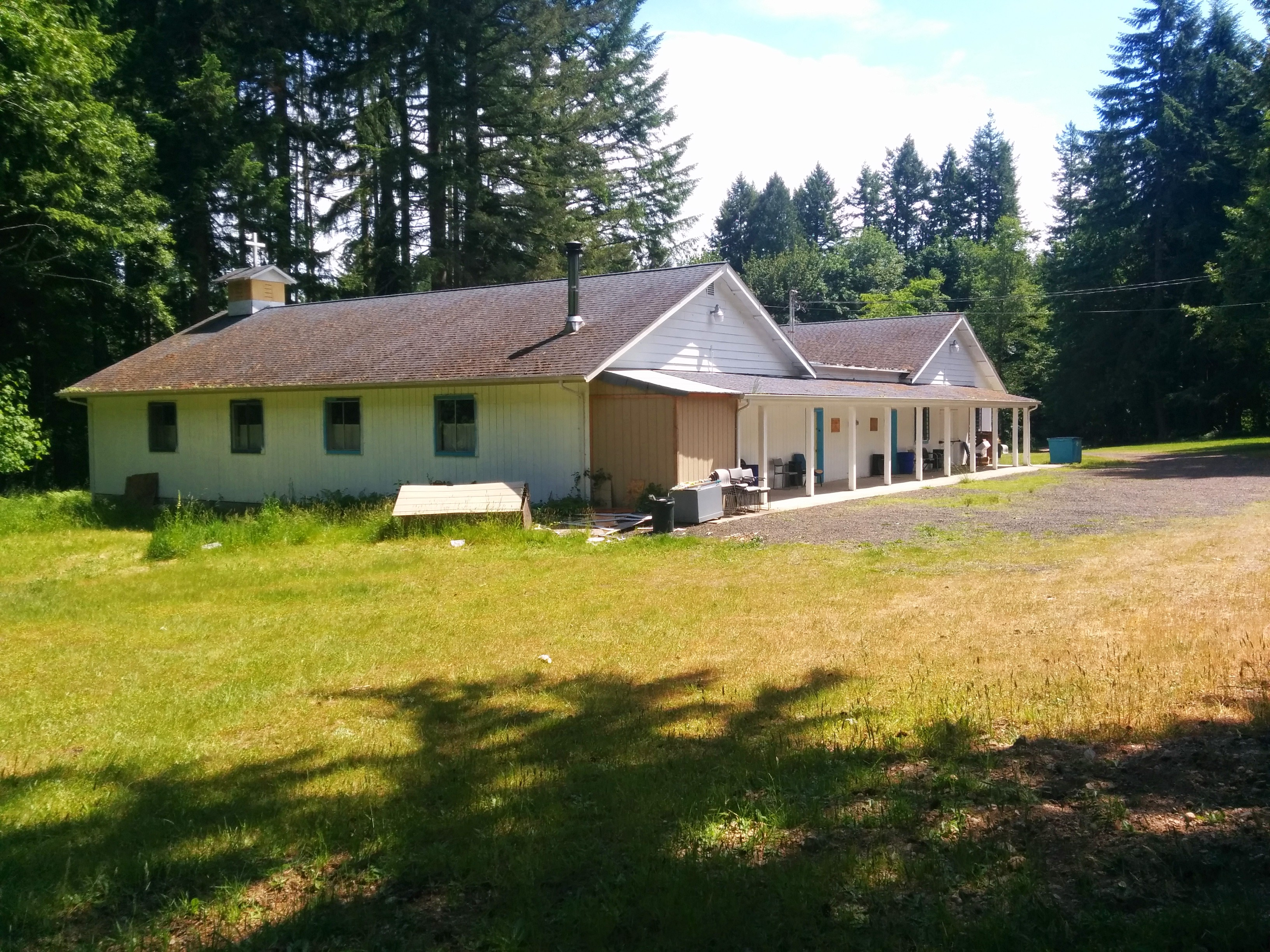
The rebuilt church as it appeared in 2015

Mud Bay Indian Shaker Church is the first church built by the Indian Shaker Church.

The first Shaker Indian church, also called the "mother church", was built c. 1885 near Olympia, then the capital of Washington Territory. The structure was built on a shoulder of the Black Hills above Mud Bay, at the southern end of Eld Inlet, an arm of Puget Sound. It was near the homes of Louis "Mud Bay Louie" Yowaluch (a.k.a. Mud Bay Louis) and his brother Sam "Mud Bay Sam" Yowaluch, co-founders of the church, first and second "headman"s respectively. Mud Bay Sam was the first Bishop (church leader) after incorporation of Shaker Indian Church in 1910.

The original church was oriented in an east-west direction, in a manner that would set the pattern for subsequent church architecture. The earliest several churches were about 18-by-24-foot (5.5 m × 7.3 m) plain wooden buildings with 10-foot (3.0 m) shingle roofs, stout wooden doors and floors. The Mud Bay church was rebuilt in 1910.

== See also ==
- List of Indian Shaker Church buildings in Washington
