= John Slocum =

19th century Coast Salish prophet

- Born: 1838; Mason County, Washington
- Died: 11 November 1897 (aged 58–59); Oakland, Washington
- Occupation: Lumber company foreman
- Years active: 1881-1897
- Known for: Prophetic visions, founder of the Indian Shaker Church
- Successor: "Mud Bay Louie" Yowaluch
- Spouse: Mary Thompson Slocum

Squ-sacht-un (1838 – 11 November 1897), also known as John Slocum, was a member of the Squaxin Island Tribe, Coast Salish, and a reputed holy man and prophet who founded the Indian Shaker Church in 1881.

== Early life ==
Born in Mason County, Washington in 1838, Slocum was introduced to Christianity by missionaries working in Washington's Puget Sound region. As a young man he had lived on the Skokomish Indian Reservation, where he attended a Presbyterian church and also became familiar with the Roman Catholic faith after being baptized by a Catholic priest. He worked as a cutter and hauler for a lumber company, and eventually became a foreman, owning his own logging company with a 14-man crew. In order to facilitate the transport of timber, Slocum's crew constructed several corduroy roads on the reservation. Slocum, like many other loggers, drank and gambled with his friends in the evenings. Because alcoholic beverages were illegal on the reservation, Slocum drank Jamaica Ginger, an extract with a high alcohol content that was sold as a health tonic.

== First vision ==
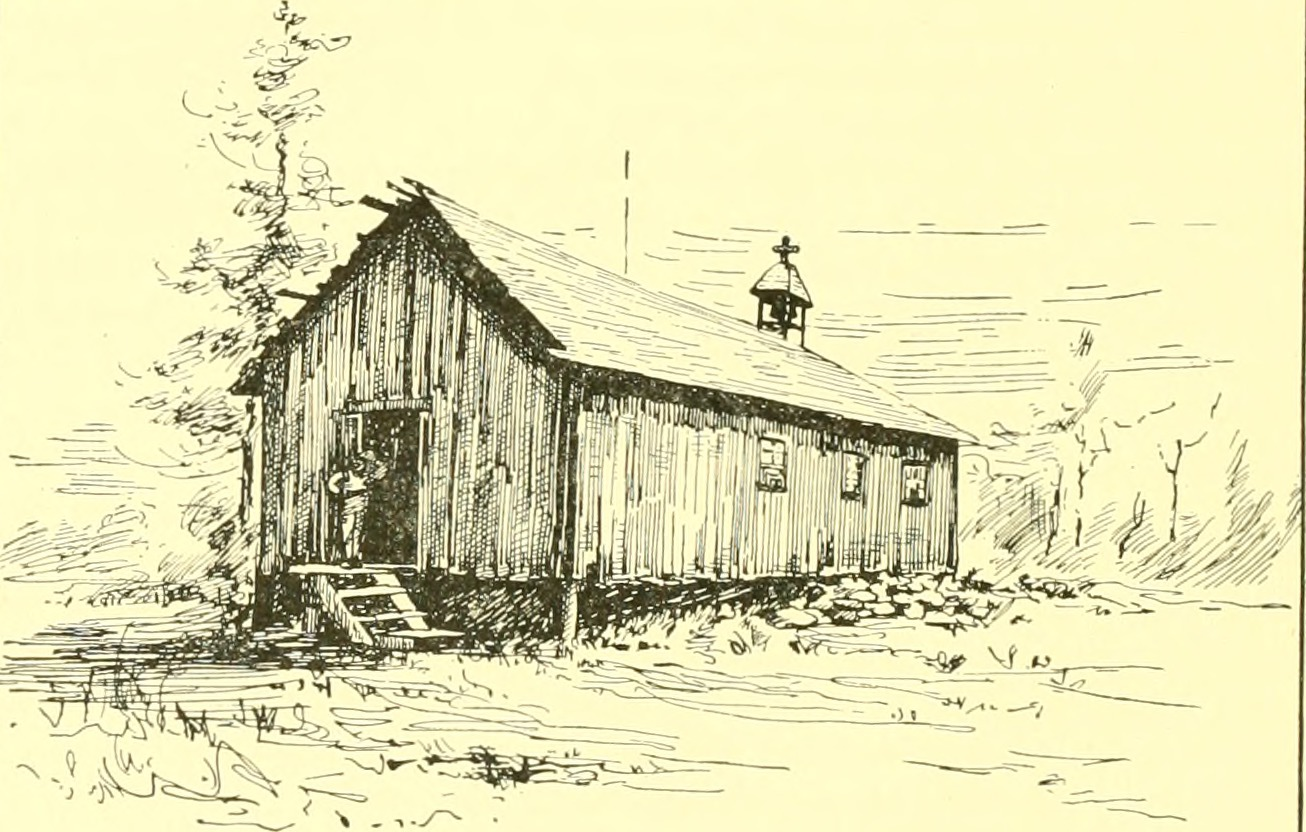
John Slocum's first Indian Shaker Church at Mud Bay, Eld Inlet, Washington State, circa 1892.

In 1881 he became ill and allegedly fell into a coma. His family believed that he was dead, however Slocum revived after a few hours and said that he had had a vision in which he was transported to the gates of heaven. There he met an angel who told him that because he had led an immoral life, he would not be permitted to enter. The angel gave Slocum the choice of going to Hell or returning to earth to instruct his people in a new religion. He was told how to bring Native American peoples to salvation. This experience was similar to that described by other 19th-century Native American prophets, including Neolin, Handsome Lake, Yonaguska, Tenskwatawa, Tavibo and his son Wovoka, and Smohalla, all of whom had prophetic visions. In 1886, Slocum began preaching a message he designated "Tschadam." Slocum said God had informed him that Native Americans would be saved if they gave up harmful behaviors such as drinking, smoking tobacco, and gambling. He also warned against shamanistic healers and their rituals. Slocum believed that he had been granted a limited time on earth, during which he felt compelled to construct a church and guide his people towards salvation.

== Second vision and origins of the Indian Shaker Church ==
Slocum continued to operate his logging crew, and eventually he started drinking again. About a year later, Slocum once again became ill. While his wife, Mary Thompson Slocum, cared for him, she started shaking uncontrollably in his presence. When he recovered, he interpreted her shaking as a spiritual manifestation which saved him from death. Slocum incorporated shaking or twitching into the religion as a way to brush off sin, sickness, or bad feelings. This practice led non-natives to call the Church the "Indian Shaker Religion." Slocum and some of his followers were imprisoned regularly for their opposition to government-mandated acculturation programs for Pacific Coast peoples. Persecutions ended after the church was incorporated in Oregon (1907), Washington (1910), and California (1932), and in the late 20th century more than 20 congregations united, with some 3,000 adherents.

== Death and legacy ==
Slocum died in Oakland, Washington in 1897 and was initially buried in Johns Prairie, an outlying district of Shelton, Washington. He was reburied in the Shelton Memorial Cemetery on 5 October 1975, and a monument was dedicated at his grave site. Slocum was succeeded as church leader by Louis "Mud Bay Louie" Yowaluch (d. 1906), his friend and former employee in the timber-cutting trade. Louis was in turn succeeded by his brother "Mud Bay Sam" Yowaluch (1846–1911), another friend of Slocum.

The Indian Shaker Religion is still practiced and combines many traditional native beliefs and customs with Christian beliefs about God, heaven and hell. The church specializes in the spiritual treatment of drug and alcohol dependence.

== See also ==
- Native American temperance activists
- Indian Shaker Church
