= Mud Bay, Thurston County, Washington =

Bay in Puget Sound, Washington state

Coordinates: 47°04′57″N 122°59′21″W

Mud Bay is the southernmost reach of Puget Sound, at Eld Inlet just outside the city limits of Olympia, Washington.

== History ==
The name Eld Inlet was officially bestowed after a member of the U.S. Navy's Wilkes Expedition, but "Mud Bay" is a local, informal adoption.

Mud Bay was once a highly productive ground for the Olympia Oyster. The first Indian Shaker Church building was constructed above the bay c. 1890, Mud Bay being the home of the founder Sam "Mud Bay Sam" Yowaluch, the first Bishop of the church.

The Mud Bay Logging Company ran a railroad to the bay where they had a log dump.

== Landmarks and attractions ==
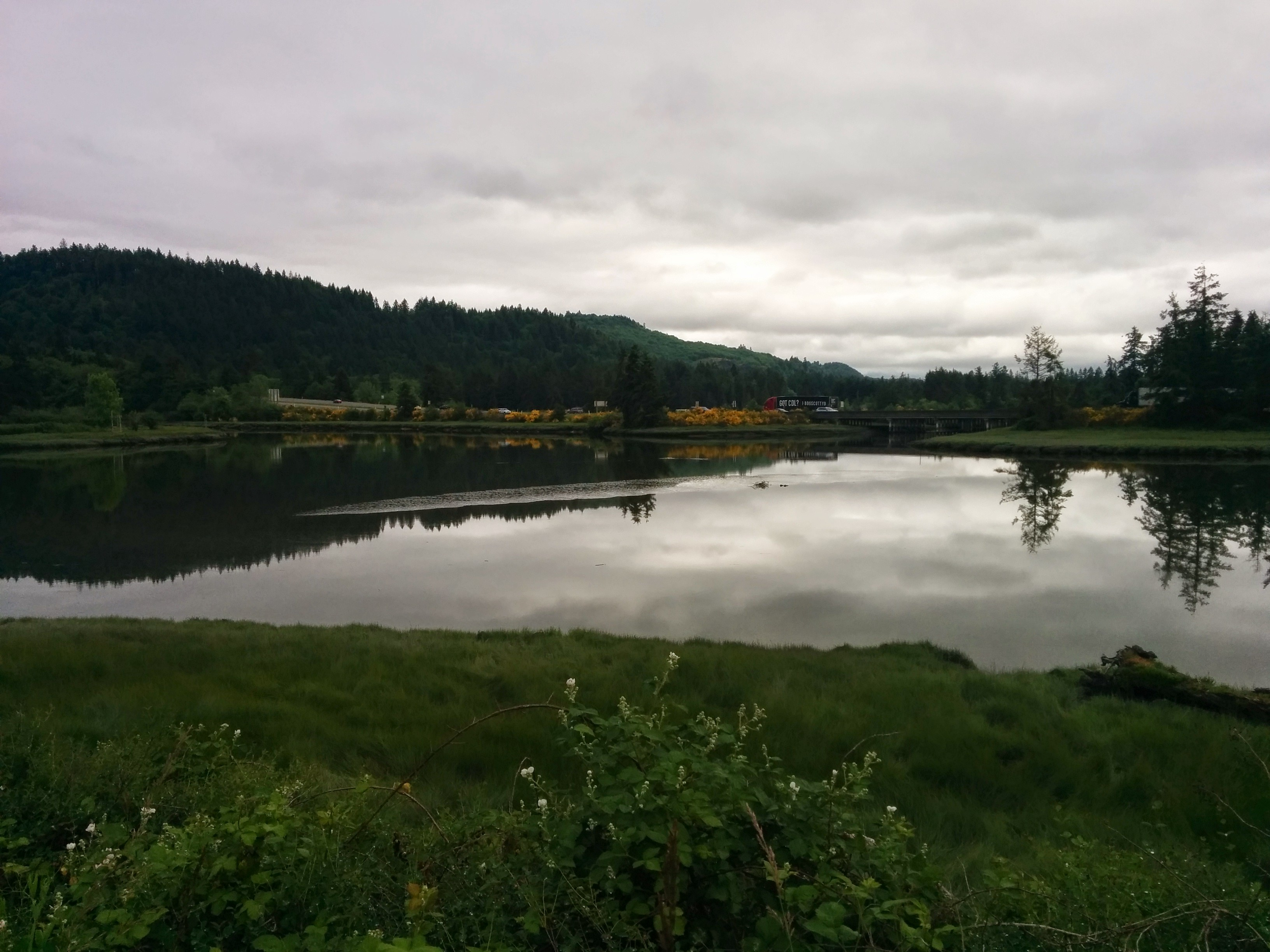
High tide on Mud Bay in the spring

A roadside attraction was placed at the bay near U.S. Route 101 in 2002: a set of larger-than-life metal sculptures of cows and a bull created by Western Washington sculptor Gary Vig. The bull is 22 feet (6.7 m) long and weighs 3 tons.

An interpretive sign about the landing of Peter Puget at Mud Bay was placed by the county's historical commission along Mud Bay Road. The William Cannon Footpath (or Trail) is a 4,000-foot (1,200 m) long public-access trail built in 2002 along the bayshore in the vicinity of the log dump, in partnership with Ralph Munro, McLane Elementary School, Capital High School, NOAA, and others.

The Blue Heron Bakery was a local landmark whole-grain bakery on the edge of the bay from 1978 until 2015 when it moved about a mile east into Olympia.

The Mud Bay Indian Shaker Church, the first church building of that religion, was built on the shoulder of the Black Hills overlooking the bay in 1885.

=== Events ===
The Mud Bay Run is a traditional annual, 500-meter clothing-optional race across the mud flats at low tide. It is held on the day of, and just before, The Evergreen State College's graduation procession.

== Notable people ==
People from the Mud Bay area include:

- Mud Bay Sam Yowaluch, cofounder and Bishop of the Indian Shaker Church
- Mud Bay Louie Yowaluch, Sam's brother and cofounder of the Indian Shaker Church
- Angeline Tobin Frank, of the Squaxin Island Tribe, mother of Nisqually Tribe chairman Billy Frank, Jr., grew up within an oyster farming family on Mud Bay.
- William McLane and Martha McLeod McLane, homesteaders on Mud Bay c. 1852. William McLane served several terms in the Washington Territorial Legislature.

== See also ==
- List of geographic features in Thurston County, Washington
