= Leschi (Nisqually) =

Chief of the Nisqually Indian Tribe

- ləšx̌iʔ
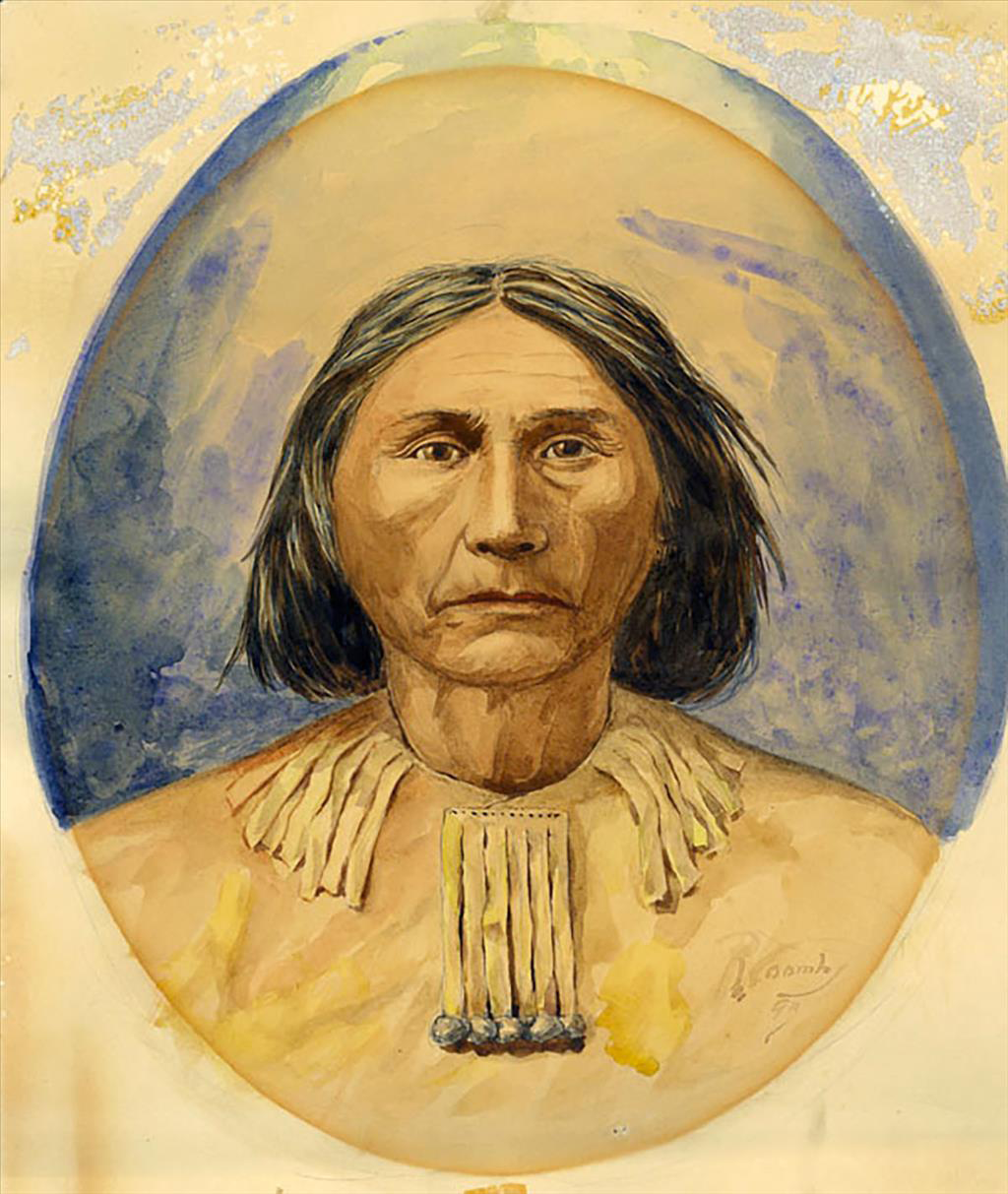
- Chief Leschi

Nisqually leader

Personal details
- Born: c. 1808 near present-day Eatonville, Washington, U.S.
- Died: February 19, 1858 (aged 49-50) Lake Steilacoom, present-day Lakewood, Washington, U.S. 47.178575°N 122.542065°W
- Cause of death: Execution by hanging
- Resting place: Puyallup Tribal Cemetery – Tacoma

Chief Leschi (/ˈlɛʃaɪ/; Lushootseed: ləšx̌iʔ; c. 1808 – February 19, 1858) was a chief of the Nisqually Tribe of southern Puget Sound, Washington, primarily in the area of the Nisqually River.

Following outbreaks of violence and the Yakima Wars (1855–1858), as a leader Leschi was charged with the killings of two Washington Territorial Volunteers. He was hanged for murder on February 19, 1858, although supporters argued that he could not be charged with murder in the death of a combatant in a recognized war. Leschi was informally exonerated in a non-legally binding ruling in 2004 by a Historical Court of Inquiry of Washington State, following a resolution by both houses of the legislature asking the State Supreme Court to vacate his conviction.

== Life ==
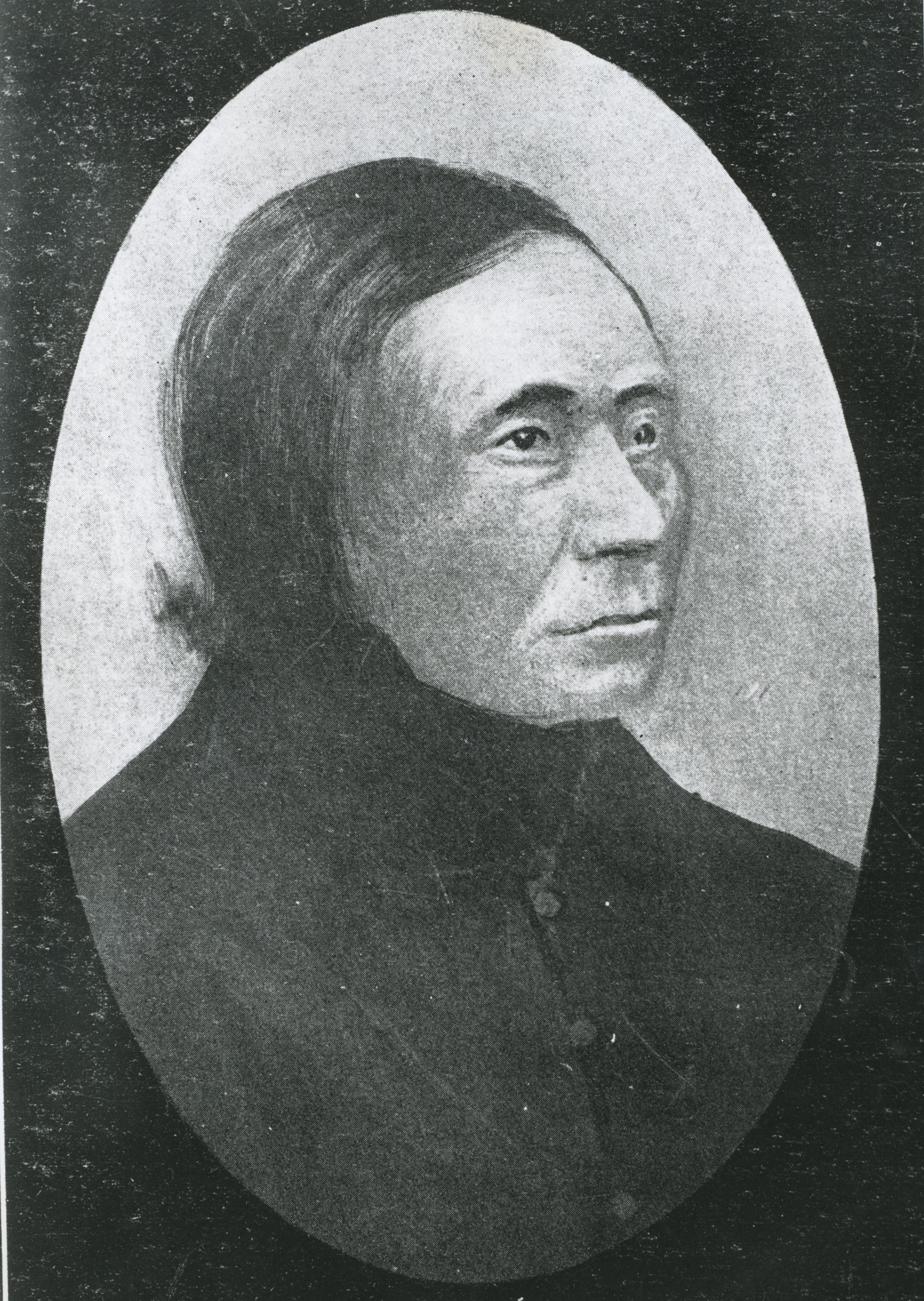
Leschi as he appeared in the 1850s

Leschi was born in about 1808 into the Mishalpam (″Mashel River people″) or Mica'l Band of Upper (Mountain) Nisqually to a Nisqually chief and a Klickitat (X̣ʷáɬx̣ʷaypam - "Prairie People") woman of the Yakama (Mámachatpam). Their primary village site was Basha'labsh on Mashel River near present La Grande, Washington in what is today southern Pierce County, Washington. He also had an older brother, Quiemuth, and a sister. The Nisqually people (Squalli-Absch - "people of the grass") traditionally occupied a large area along the Nisqually River and its delta at the foot of Puget Sound, an area rich in fish and game. Leschi was respected by his people. The origin of Leschi's name is unknown. Leschi more than likely adopted it, and it may have been influenced by a distant relative, or he may have just enjoyed the sound of it.

Isaac Stevens, first governor of Washington Territory, appointed Leschi as chief in 1854 to represent the Nisqually and Puyallup tribes at the Medicine Creek Treaty council of December 26 of that year. Under pressure, the tribes ceded to the United States all or part of present-day King, Pierce, Lewis, Grays Harbor, Mason, and Thurston counties, agreeing to the requirement that the American Indians inhabiting the area move to reservations.

Some historians say that Leschi either refused to sign (and his "X" was forged by another) or signed under protest. The historical record is unclear on this point. He was reported as arguing that the territory designated as the reservation for the Nisqually tribe was a rocky piece of high ground unsuited to growing food and cut off from access to the Nisqually River, which had provided the salmon that was the mainstay of their diets and culture.

On June 11, 1855, Governor Isaac I. Stevens forced representatives from the Yakima, Nez Perce, Walla Walla, Umatilla and Cayuse tribes to sign a treaty in which the various tribes signed away vast amounts of land in return for money, reservations, and other provisions. Although the treaty stated that white miners would not be allowed on reservation lands, miners frequently passed through these lands, stealing horses from the tribes and abusing Native American women. The Yakima killed some miners in retaliation. When Indian sub-agent, Andrew J. Bolon, tried to investigate the murders, he was killed. Fighting broke out between Major Haller's troops and the Yakima. This conflict marked the start of the Yakima War (1855–56).

Leschi was charged for these murders, in part because of his participation in the Yakima War of 1855–1858. He also was charged for his role in the Battle of Seattle, which took place in January 1856. This battle was of little consequence for the whites, since the natives were held off by the cannons of the Decatur, a naval warship with a crew of about 30. They inflicted little damage on Americans. But Chief Leschi had reportedly been seen commanding the native troops, and was credited with the native attack as a whole. His standing deteriorated among white settlers. Despite this, Stevens was convinced that white settlers were cooperating with Leschi. Stevens declared martial law over Pierce County on April 2, 1856. (Stevens was later charged with contempt of court in relation to this declaration; as governor; however, he pardoned himself.)

On October 30, 1855, seven Washington Territorial Volunteers were attacked by Indians at Connell's Prairie, or Tenalcut Prairie, located between Buckley and Lake Tapps along the White River (in present-day Pierce County). Two were killed, Colonel A. Benton Moses and Joseph Miles. A year later, when hostilities had quieted somewhat, Governor Isaac I. Stevens of Washington Territory, requested that federal troops deliver five Indians for trial. One was Chief Leschi, charged with the murder of Moses. But the federal troops had concluded a peace with Leschi, who had fled east of the Cascades when his war failed. Stevens remained adamant, and the federal troops agreed to find Leschi. They offered fifty blankets for information leading to the arrest and capture of Leschi. Sluggia, a nephew of Leschi, and Eli-ku-kah, a Nisqually, delivered Leschi to the whites. Sluggia had formed a relationship with the chief's youngest wife Mary, which may have added to his zeal to capture Leschi and turn him over to Stevens. Sluggia was later killed by a Leschi loyalist named Wahelut, who was outraged over the nephew's treachery. Wahelnut's fatal shooting of Sluggia was approved by the local tribes.

Leschi was taken into federal custody in early November 1856, and his brother Quiemuth surrendered shortly thereafter. Quiemuth was murdered on November 18, 1856, by an unknown assailant, in Governor Stevens' office in Olympia. He was being held there for the night on the way to the jail at Fort Steilacoom (now in Lakewood, Washington).

Leschi was put on trial on November 17, 1856, for the murder of Colonel Moses, which he denied having committed. His first trial resulted in a hung jury; the judge had instructed the jury that killing of combatants during wartime did not constitute murder. The second trial began on March 18, 1857. The judge did not give this instruction, and the court did not allow Leschi's defense lawyers, Frank Clark and William Wallace, to introduce potentially exonerating evidence. The testimony of Antonio B. Rabbeson swayed the jury's verdict of guilty. Rabbeson was said to have vague testimony, but the defense could do little to refute it. Leschi and his lawyer team tried to present a map that refuted Rabbeson's details of the event as physically impossible, but the jury appeared to have difficulty understanding it.

Sometime after his second trial, Leschi was seen to make the "sign of the cross" and heard to speak a Christian prayer. Leschi is believed to have received a Catholic baptism before his second trial. He was baptized by Father Chirouse, who was fairly fluent in Salish, Leschi's native language. Father Chirouse had performed the marriage of Leschi and his youngest wife, Mary. Leschi was convicted and sentenced to death on June 10, 1857.

Supporter William Fraser Tolmie petitioned the new governor, LaFayette McMullen, to pardon Leschi, but the governor refused. United States Army officer August Kautz, another supporter, published two issues of a newspaper defending Leschi. Titled the Truth Teller, the newspaper's masthead said: "Devoted to the Dissemination of Truth and the Suppression of Humbug." The first issue of the paper containing this masthead was published on February 3, 1858; it had four pages of columns and articles that favored Leschi and his innocence. Kautz also included his recollections of the survey he had carried out at the crime scene, which he believed strongly discredited Rabbeson's account of the attack. Tolmie's petition and the front page of the Truth Teller are reprinted in Ezra Meeker's 1905 history, The Tragedy of Leschi, which was republished in 1980. Meeker was on the first jury, and one of two men who voted for acquittal. Military officers refused to execute Leschi, as they said he was a valid war combatant and should not be tried. Pierce County authorities conducted the execution. It was postponed to January 22, 1858, to allow an appeal to the Territorial Supreme Court.

== Execution ==
Leschi's supporters arranged an elaborate plot in which the Pierce County sheriff, George Williams, agreed to be arrested by sympathetic members of the United States Army rather than carry out the execution. Other Pierce County officials arranged for the execution on February 19, 1858, when Leschi was hanged in a small valley, from a hastily constructed gallows near Lake Steilacoom. The land was later developed as a golf course and, more recently, suburban housing. A small stone monument to Leschi was installed in a Lakewood strip mall in 1963. The monument was damaged over Christmas weekend of 2022; though city officials at first declined responsibility for fixing it, the mayor intervened and the 4-ton granite boulder was repaired.

The hangman, Charles Grainger, later said, "I felt then I was hanging an innocent man, and I believe it yet." Some of Leschi's last words were,

"I do not know anything about your laws. I have supposed that the killing of armed men in wartime was not murder; if it was, the soldiers who killed Indians are guilty of murder too... I went to war because I believed that the Indian had been wronged by the White men, and I did everything in my power to beat the Boston soldiers, but, for lack of numbers, supplies, and ammunition, I have failed."

On February 5 the second issue of The Truth Teller was published; it continued to defend the innocence of Leschi. Kautz sent numerous issues to Gov McMullin's district in Tennessee, as a last reminder of how McMullin's inaction led to the death of an innocent man.

== Legacy ==
In the late 1880s, developer Frederick J. Grant named the Leschi neighborhood in Seattle after the chief. Other places commemorate the chief by name: Leschi Park; schools in Seattle and Puyallup; and streets in Seattle, Lakewood, Steilacoom, Anderson Island, Oak Harbor, and Olympia, all bear his name. Additionally, the MOUT site at Joint Base Lewis-McChord is named Leschi Town in his honor. A fireboat of the Seattle Fire Department, Leschi, also bears his name.

In March 2004, both houses of the Washington state legislature passed resolutions stating that Leschi was wrongly convicted and executed, and asking the state supreme court to vacate Leschi's conviction. The court's chief justice, however, said that this was unlikely to happen. It was not clear that the state court had jurisdiction in a matter decided 146 years earlier in a territorial court. On December 10, 2004, Chief Leschi was informally exonerated by a unanimous vote by a Historical Court of Inquiry following a definitive trial in absentia. The exoneration was not legally binding.

== Category ==
- List of wrongful convictions in the United States
