= Nisqually people =

Nisqually
dxʷsqʷaliʔabš

Regions with significant populations
- United States (Washington)

Languages
- English, Nisqually

Related ethnic groups
- other Coast Salish peoples

The Nisqually /nɪsˈkwɔːliː/ are a Lushootseed-speaking Native American tribe in western Washington state in the United States. They are a Southern Coast Salish people. They are federally recognized as the Nisqually Indian Tribe, formerly known as the Nisqually Indian Tribe of the Nisqually Reservation and the Confederated Tribes of the Chehalis Reservation.

The tribe lives on a reservation in the Nisqually River valley near the river delta. The Nisqually Indian Reservation, at, comprises 20.602 km^{2} (7.955 sq mi) of land area on both sides of the river, in western Pierce County and eastern Thurston County. In the 2000 census, it had a resident population of 588 persons, all in the Thurston County portion, on the southwest side of the Nisqually River.

The tribe moved onto their reservation east of Olympia, Washington, in late 1854 with the signing of the Medicine Creek Treaty. As reaction to the unfairness of the treaty, many members of the tribe led by Chief Leschi engaged and were eventually defeated by the US Army in the conflict known as the Puget Sound War in 1855–56.

== Government ==
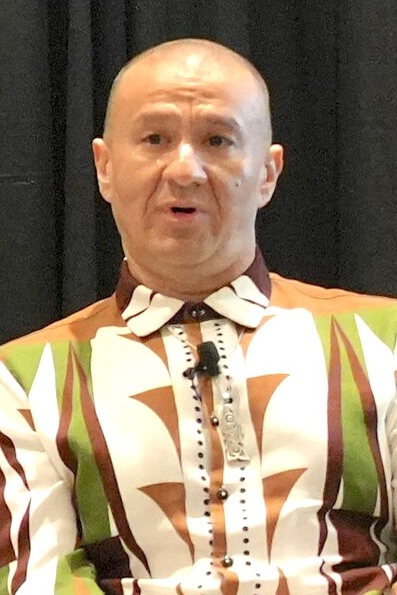
Willie Frank III, elected tribal leader and former Nisqually Tribal Council Chairman (2025)

On September 9, 1946, the tribe's constitution and bylaws were approved. The constitution was amended in 1994. The governing body of the Tribe is the General Council comprising all enrolled tribal members 18 years of age or older. The day-to-day business and economic affairs of the tribe are overseen by a tribal council composed of seven tribal members elected by the tribe's voting membership.

== Language ==
The Nisqually speak a subdialect of the southern dialect of Lushootseed (called Twulshootseed), which is a Coast Salish language. In Lushootseed, their name is dxʷsqʷaliʔabš, meaning "people of the grass."

== Country ==
The Nisqually Indians originally inhabited the interior woodlands and coastal waters from Mount Rainier west to Puget Sound. The lifestyle of the Nisqually, like many other Northwest Coastal tribes, revolved around fishing for salmon. In 1917, Pierce County, through the process of condemnation proceedings (eminent domain), took 3,353 acres (13.57 km^{2}) for the Fort Lewis Military Reserve.

When building Ft. Lewis in 1917, the United States government wanted to control land for the project that rightfully belonged to the Nisqually people. The War Department negotiated a price of $25 per acre to be paid to the natives for the land the U.S. deemed necessary for the fort. The Nisqually people had neither the opportunity nor the funds to fight the government's acquisition of their lands. When the war ended in 1918, the Nisqually people petitioned for their land to be returned to them, as the fort was no longer needed to train troops for the war. The request was denied by Newton Baker, President Wilson's Secretary of War. Cannon and artillery fire from the fort could be heard from the Nisqually reservation for the better part of the next century.

== History ==
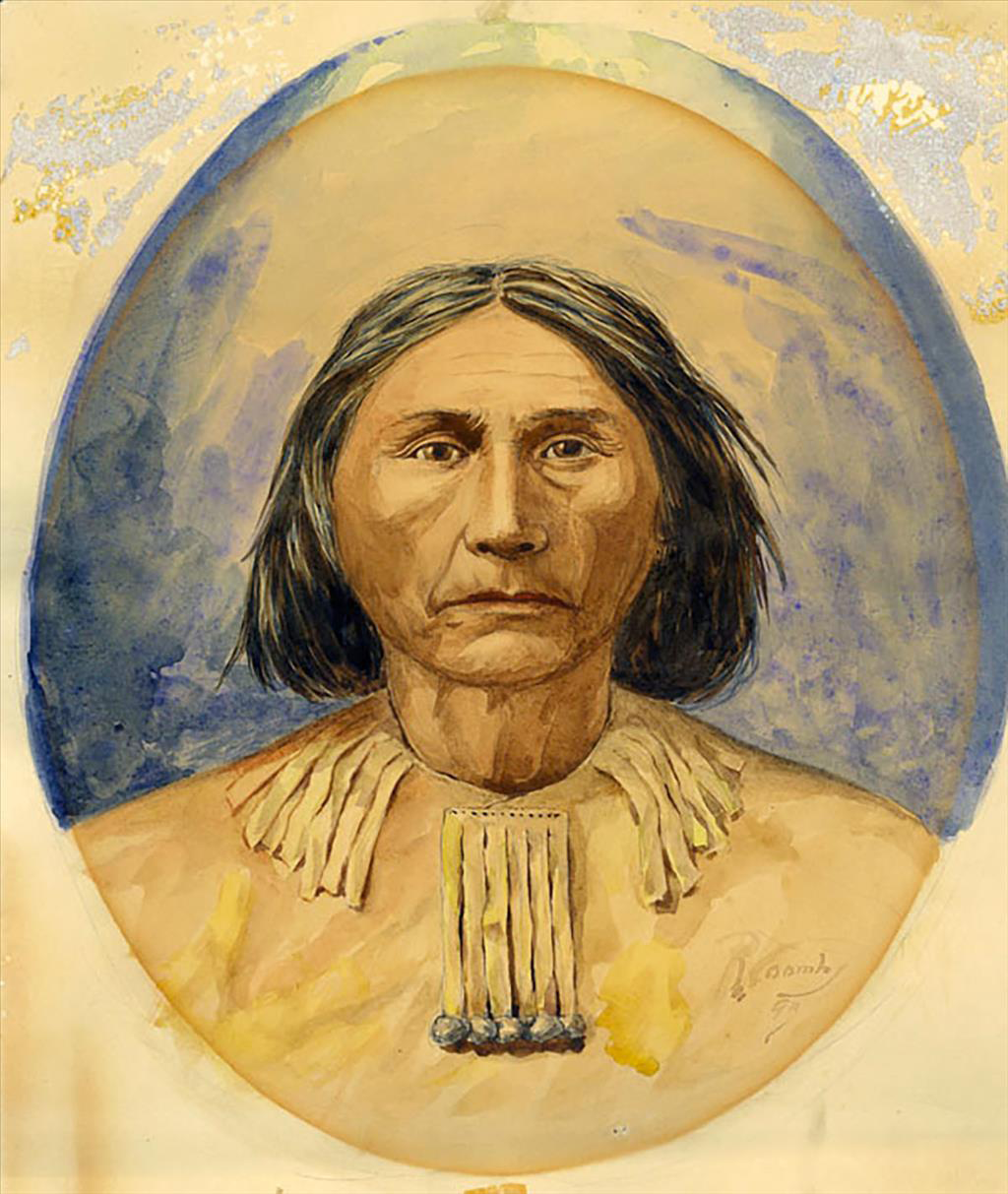
Chief Leschi

The Nisqually people have lived in the watershed for thousands of years. According to legend, the Squalli-absch (ancestors of the modern Nisqually Indian Tribe), came north from the Great Basin, crossed the Cascade Mountain Range and erected their first village in a basin now known as Skate Creek, just outside the Nisqually River Watershed's southern boundary. Later, a major village would be located near the Mashel River.

The Nisqually have always been a fishing people. The salmon has not only been the mainstay of their diet, but the foundation of their culture as well. The Nisqually Tribe is the prime steward of the Nisqually River fisheries resources, and operate two fish hatcheries: one on Clear Creek and one on Kalama Creek.

The Nisqually Tribe is located on the Nisqually River in rural Thurston County, 15 miles (24 km) east of Olympia, Washington. As of the year 2005, the tribe had a service area population of 5,719 Native Americans, 600 of whom reside on the reservation. An additional 5,119 service population members live off the reservation in Thurston and Pierce Counties. Tribal land holdings, on and near the Nisqually reservation, exceed 1,000 acres (4 km^{2})—all of which has been reacquired since 1986.

One of their settlements, Kalama, became a notable coastal stop in the fur trading business conducted by the Hudson's Bay Company in the mid-1800s which also recruited many Hawaiians in its workforce for their navigational skills; these Hawaiians setlled and even intermarried with the Nisqually.

The original reservation was established by the Medicine Creek Treaty of December 26, 1854. The reservation consisted of 1,280 acres (5.2 km^{2}) on Puget Sound. On January 20, 1856, an executive order enlarged it to 4,717 acres (19.1 km^{2}) on both sides of the Nisqually River.

On September 30, 1884, land was set aside and divided into one-family allotments on both sides of the Nisqually River. The land did not include the river. The people lived in peace for a while harvesting fish from the river and growing potatoes on the prairie tracts.

== Interactions Between European Settlers and the Nisqually People ==
In the 1840s European settlers began to migrate into Nisqually territory. The numbers of settlers gradually grew and the Nisqually people were originally peaceful with the settlers until the actions of territorial governor Isaac Stevens in 1853. Stevens terminated Indian land rights and took millions of acres from native peoples and attempted to establish the Treaty of Medicine Creek with Chief Leschi of the Nisqually people. The treaty proposed was declined by Leschi due to the small amounts of land they would receive from it as well as the treaty requiring the Nisqually people to move away from Medicine Creek to less livable and isolated shrubland. It is firmly believed by many that Stevens’ laws and actions in the war heavily influenced the retaliation of the Nisqually natives in the Puget Sound Indian war due to his mistreatment of the Native Nisqually and the middling and unsurvivable land he assigned them. After the Puget Sound Indian War had ceased, the native Nisqually tribesmen were assigned a new reservation back alongside the river but survival was still difficult due to the restricted sizes of their reservations as well as the U.S. military's confiscation of 3,000 acres of their land for the creation of the Fort Lewis Military Reserve. Many Natives began to leave the reserves in search of better opportunities and homes elsewhere and from the beginning of the 20th century until the 1940s the US government controlled the education of Nisqually youth in attempts to assimilate them into mainstream American culture.

== Cuisine ==
Fish, both fresh and smoked, is an important staple in Nisqually cuisine, especially salmon, but also cod, eulachon, halibut, herring, sturgeon, and trout. Shellfish, deer, elk, and sea mammals were traditionally hunted for food. Camas, wild berries, crab apples, and other wild plants are traditionally gathered.

== Notable Nisqually ==
- Billy Frank, Jr. (1931–2014), environmental leader and treaty rights activist
- Chief Leschi (1808–1858), chief
