= Treaty of Medicine Creek =

1854 U.S. and Native Americans treaty

The Treaty of Medicine Creek was an 1854 treaty between the United States, and nine tribes and bands of Indians, occupying the lands lying around the head of Puget Sound, Washington, and the adjacent inlets. The tribes listed on the Treaty of Medicine Creek are Nisqually, Puyallup, Steilacoom, Squawskin (Squaxin Island), S'Homamish, Stehchass, T'Peeksin, Squi-aitl, and Sa-heh-wamish. The treaty was signed on December 26, 1854 by Isaac I. Stevens, governor and superintendent of Indian Affairs of the territory at the time of the signing, along with the chiefs, head-men and delegates of the stated tribes. For the purpose of the treaty, these representatives who signed the treaty were stated to have been, "regarded as one nation, on behalf of said tribes and bands, and duly authorized by them."

== Background ==
Isaac Stevens was the governor of Washington Territory in 1854. He was directly responsible for every Native American affair including making treaties to acquire land for the United States Government. In December 1854, Stevens called a meeting of the Native American tribes who lived in the South Puget Sound area. He focused on these tribes in particular because he stated they were good laborers, excellent fisherman, and because they were also controlling trade in the area. The major tribes included the Puyallup, the Muckleshoot and the Nisqually. The Cowlitz Tribe were not included as these people had taken up farms and been absorbed into the white community in 1893.

Isaac Stevens elected to hire George Gibbs to be his second in command to negotiate the treaty, as Gibbs had traveled west in 1849 and was familiar with the native peoples. The Native Americans were told the treaty would help them by paying them for some of the land; it ended up taking prime farmland and relocating the tribes onto rough reservations. Chief Leschi of the Nisqually tribe protested the treaty. He and his people marched to Olympia to have their voices heard, but Isaac Stevens ordered them away. When the natives refused to leave, Isaac Stevens would eventually declare martial law in May of 1856 and, after the beginning of the Puget Sound War in 1855, initiate a search for Chief Leschi in order to arrest him. Chief Leschi was eventually captured and put on trial. The first jury couldn’t come to a verdict, so Isaac Stevens had the trial done a second time. This time Leschi was found guilty. Chief Leschi was hanged on February 19, 1858.

== Site ==
The site of the treaty was near the Nisqually River delta, along a creek then known as She-nah-num by the natives, or Medicine Creek by white settlers. The creek is now known as McAllister Creek.

The signing took place in Thurston County, Washington, on December 26, 1854, in a grove of Douglas fir trees well known to the tribes. The single tree remaining on the site from the original grove at the Nisqually River Delta was a de facto monument, known as Treaty Tree.

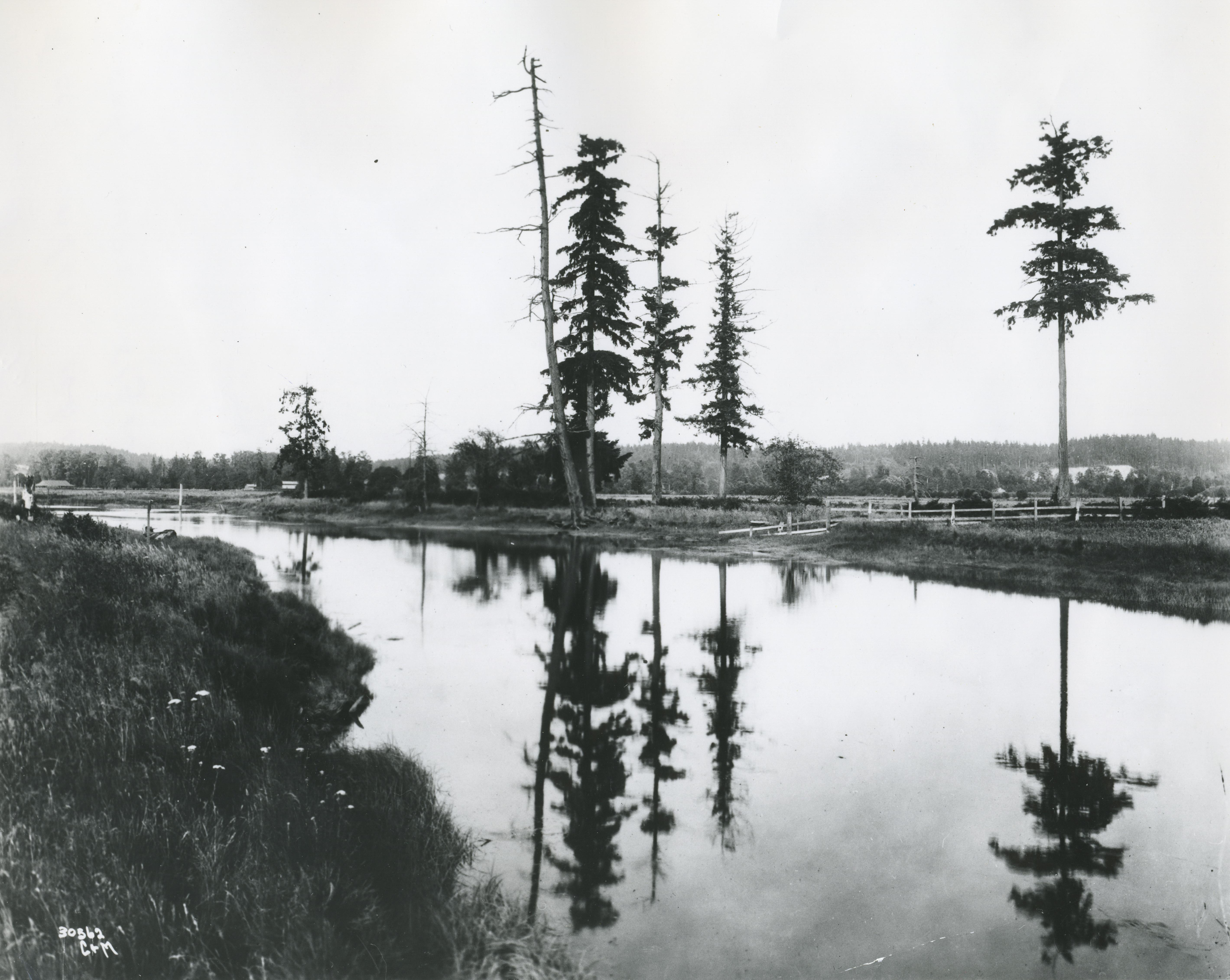
Trees under which Medicine Creek Treaty was signed, c. 1900 – c. 1920

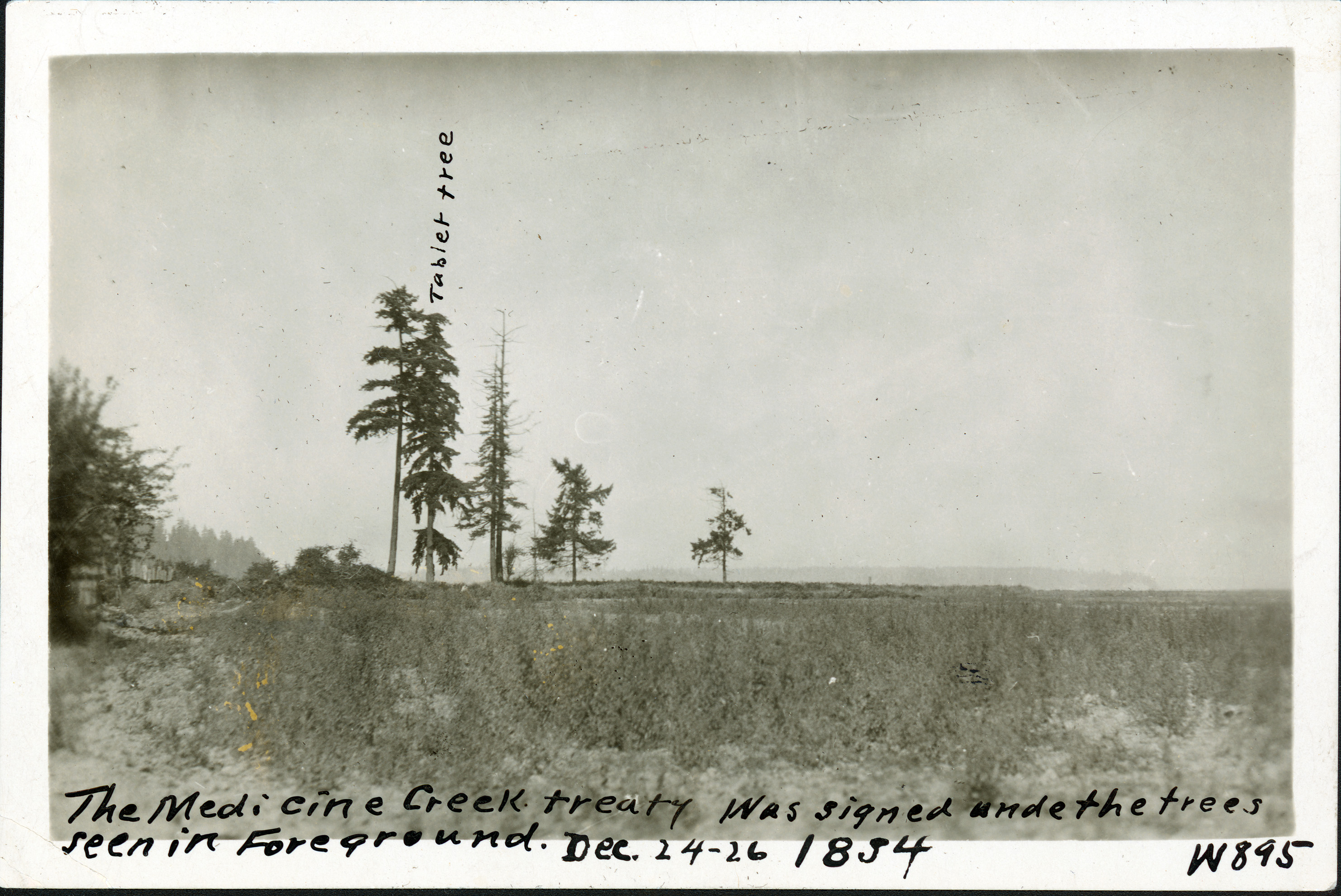
Medicine Creek Treaty site, December 12, 1928

On June 14, 1922 (Flag Day) the Sacajawea Chapter of the Daughters of the American Revolution placed a bronze tablet on the Medicine Creek Treaty Tree bearing the following inscription:

Site of the Medicine Creek Treaty between Governor Isaac I. I. Stevens and Puget Sound Indians 1854 Marked by Sacajawea Chapter, Daughters of the American Revolution 1922.

Though not recognized as an official historical location, the site was avoided during the creation of Interstate 5 in the 1960s.

A monument was erected on the hillside overlooking the creek, pointing at the site in 1976, by students of nearby Timberline High School. The monument is in the shape of a peace sign when viewed from the air, contains an old Navy buoy which represents the spherical thinking of Native Americans, a railroad rail representing the white man's straight thinking and a time capsule to be opened in 2076.

The DAR Plaque disappeared from the site during the 1970s. The large Treaty Tree, which had been languishing for decades, was formally recognized as diseased by 1975, and by 1979 was dead. Seeds from Treaty Tree that were gathered in the 1970s were re-planted in a circle 40 feet from it. The dead snag was left standing and still visible from the Interstate until 2007, finally falling during severe windstorms.

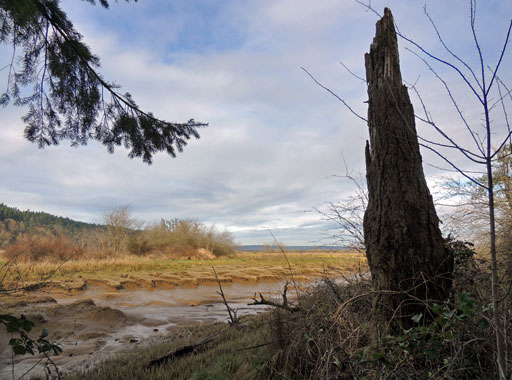
Treaty Tree where the Treaty of Medicine Creek was signed

In June 2013, a new plaque was dedicated in front of a tree growing from a seedling of the last Treaty Tree. This off-spring tree is growing on the bluff of the Thurston County Courthouse campus above Capitol Lake. Representatives of local treaty tribes joined Thurston County Commissioners for the ceremony. The plaque is inscribed as follows: "The treaty of Medicine Creek was signed December 26, 1854 by representatives of the United States Government and the leaders of the Nisqually, Puyallup and Squaxin Island Indian Tribes. The treaty established the future formal relationship between the U. S. and the Indian Nations. The Treaty Tree was located in the Nisqually delta where the 1854 treaty was signed. The treaty tree was lost in the winter of 2007, but several seedlings were propagated, including this offspring. These living trees stand testimony to the ongoing responsibilities agreed to among the signatories." The Thurston County Historic Commission was instrumental in working with the Tribes and Thurston County in arranging for the plaque and the dedication ceremony.

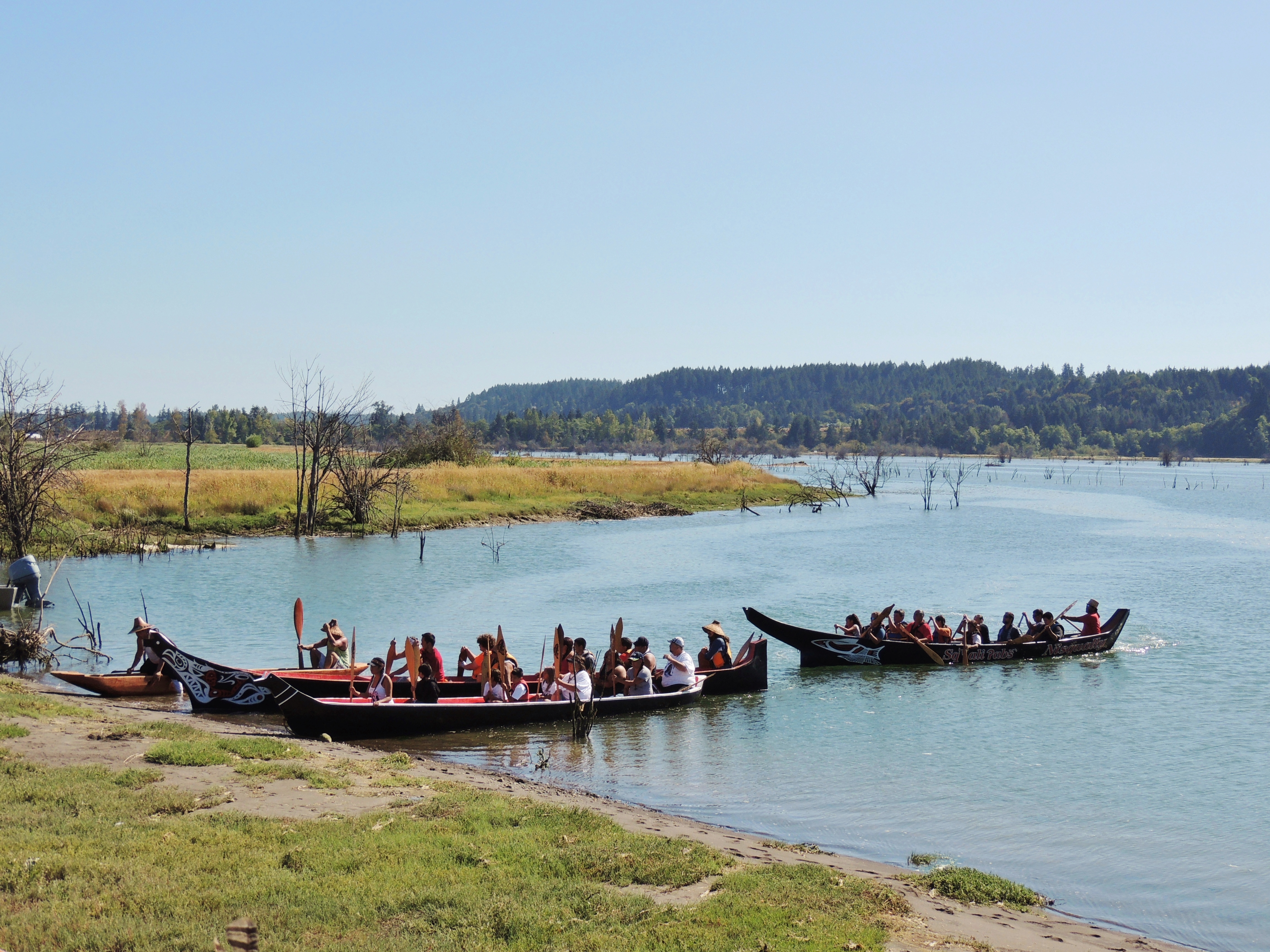
Nisqually Tribe in 2016, paddling up the Medicine (McAlllister) Creek to land near the Estuary Boardwalk

The site, now in the Billy Frank Jr. Nisqually National Wildlife Refuge, was designated by Congress as the Medicine Creek Treaty National Memorial on December 18, 2015. As of 2016, the location is only accessible by boat up McAllister Creek. No landing is permitted, but the memorial may be viewed from a distant platform on a trail.

== Treaty ==
The treaty granted 2.24 million acres (9,060;km²) of land to the United States in exchange for establishment of three reservations, cash payments over a period of twenty years, and recognition of traditional native fishing and hunting rights. The exact nature of those rights was disputed until the Boldt Decision in 1974; the Boldt Decision would also be upheld by the U.S. Supreme Court in 1979. Since the Boldt Decision, the tribes named in the treaty have had a recognized right to half of the fish caught on traditional lands throughout south Puget Sound, while before it, state and territorial governments allowed the tribes much less.

The original Nisqually Reservation was in rocky terrain and unacceptable to the Nisqually, who were a riverside fishing people. They went to war in 1855. After a year of skirmishes that followed, Nisqually Chief Leschi was hanged for murder. Leschi would be informally exonerated by the Historical Court of Inquiry of Washington State in a unanimous, though non-legally binding, ruling in December 2004.

== See also ==
- Puget Sound War
- Battle of Seattle
