= Nisqually Indian Tribe of the Nisqually Reservation =

Coordinates: 47°01′12″N 122°39′27″W

Nisqually Indian Tribe of the Nisqually Reservation dxʷsqʷaliʔabš
Total population
- 650 enrolled members

Regions with significant populations
- United States (Washington)

Languages
- English, Nisqually

Religion
- traditional tribal religion, Indian Shaker Church

Related ethnic groups
- other Nisqually people

The Nisqually Indian Tribe of the Nisqually Reservation (Lushootseed: dxʷsqʷaliʔabš) is a federally recognized tribe of Nisqually people. They are a Coast Salish people of Indigenous peoples of the Pacific Northwest. Their tribe is located in the State of Washington.

Some of the people of Nisqually descent are enrolled in the Confederated Tribes of the Chehalis Reservation but neither tribe allows a Nisqually to be enrolled in both tribes at the same time.

== Reservation and lands under tribal ownership ==
The Nisqually Reservation is 1,000 acres (400 ha) large and located in Thurston County, Washington, 15 miles (24 km) east of Olympia.

The reservation was established by the Treaty of Medicine Creek of 1854. The initial 1,280 acres (520 ha) was enlarged to 4,717 acres (1,909 ha) two years later. The tribal lands were broken into individual allotments on either side of the Nisqually River in 1884.

During World War I, Pierce County, through the process of condemnation proceedings (eminent domain), took over 3,300 acres (1,300 ha) for the Fort Lewis Military Reserve. When the war ended in 1918, the Nisqually people petitioned for their land to be returned to them, but the request was denied by the Secretary of War, Newton Baker. The remaining portion of the reservation not under control of the military is approximately 1,700 acres (690 ha).

In recent decades, the tribe has re-acquired collective ownership of 450 acres (180 ha) of reserve lands as well as additional off-reserve lands, totaling over 1,000 acres (400 ha). The remaining parts of the reservation are include 800 acres (320 ha) of private Indian Allotments (dating to 1884) and 450 acres (180 ha) held by non-Indian owners.

== Government ==
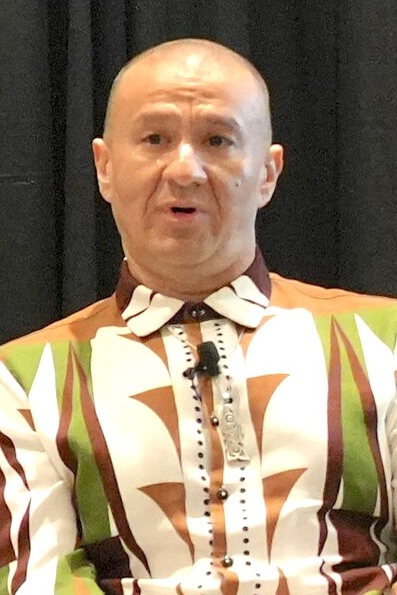
Willie Frank III, former Nisqually Tribal Council Chair, at SXSW 2025

The Nisqually Indian Tribe is headquartered in Olympia, Washington. It ratified its constitution and bylaws on September 9, 1946. These were amended on October 28, 1994. The tribe is governed by a seven-member, democratically elected General Council. The current tribal administration is as follows:

- Chairman: Ken Choke
- Vice Chairman: Antonette Squally
- Secretary: Jackie Whittington
- Treasurer: Norine Wells
- Fifth Council Member: Chris Olin
- Sixth Council Member: Guido Levy Jr.
- Seventh Council Member: Leighanna Scott

== Language ==
English is commonly spoken by the tribe. Its traditional language is the Nisqually language, which is a Southern Puget Sound Salish language.

== Economic development ==
The Nisqually Indian Tribe owns and operates Red Wind Casino, Blue Camas Buffet, Squalli-Absch Grille, The Medicine Creek Deli, and Pealo's Landing.

In 2017, the tribe began acquiring parcels of vacant land in northern Lacey for a future commercial development. The 260-acre (110 ha) property was transferred to the Nisqually Indian Tribe in 2020 and is planned to be used for a new casino, convention center, and entertainment district named Quiemuth Village. The site is north of Interstate 5 and was originally intended for a mixed-use development that only had one completed store: a branch of the Cabela's franchise.

== Notable tribal members ==
- Billy Frank Jr. (1931–2014), Native American indigenous rights and environmentalist activist
