= Indian Shaker Church =

Christian denomination in North America

Total population
- ~2000 (late 20th century)

Founder
- John Slocum

Regions with significant populations
- Pacific Northwest

The Indian Shaker Church is a Christian denomination founded in 1881 by Squaxin shaman John Slocum and his wife Mary Slocum in Washington state. The Indian Shaker Church is a unique blend of Native, Catholic, and Protestant beliefs and practices.

The Indian Shakers are unrelated to the Shakers (United Society of Believers) and are not to be confused with the Native American Church.

== History and practices ==
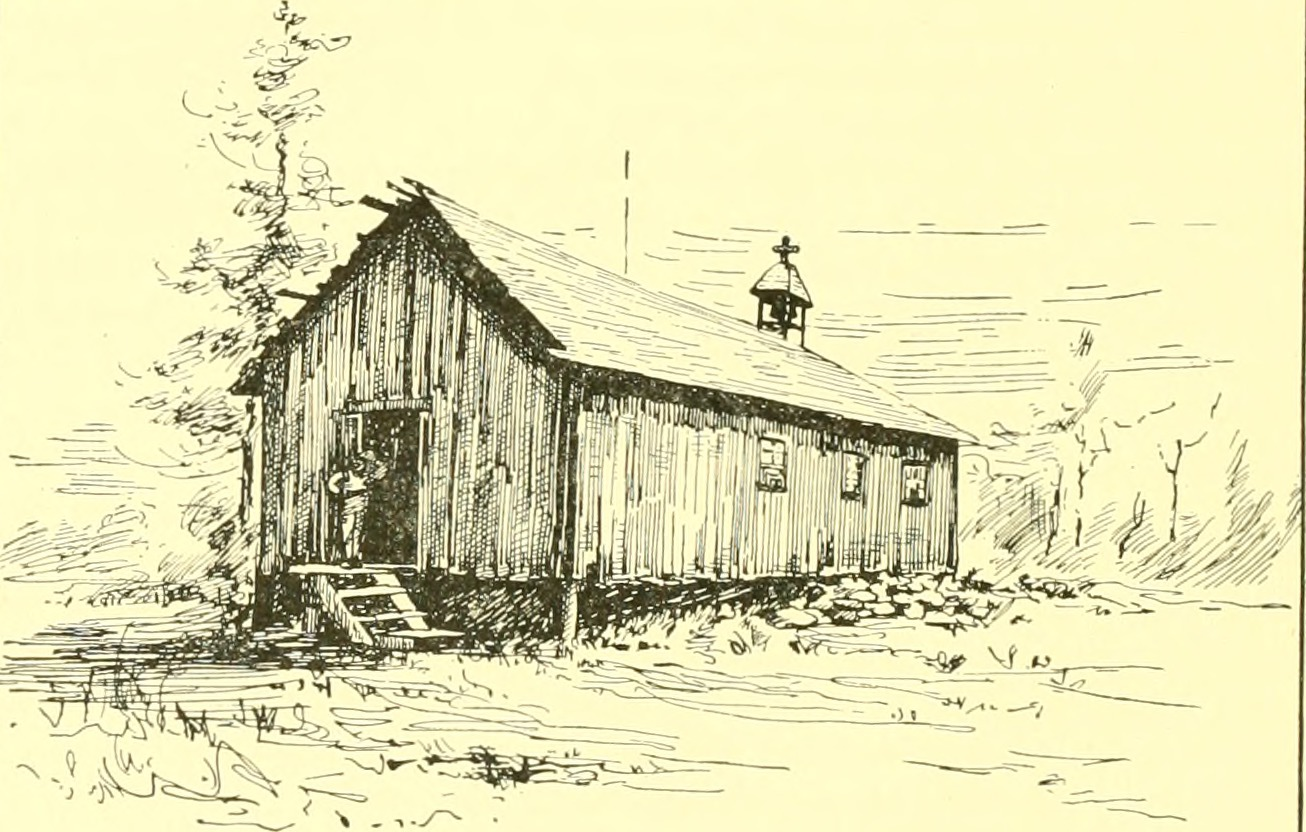
The first Indian Shaker Church at Mud Bay, Eld Inlet, Washington State, c. 1892

As tradition tells, Slocum (Squ-sacht-um) had died from sickness in 1881 when he revived during his wake reporting a visit to heaven, where he was told by an angel that, "you've been a pretty bad Indian", and where he received instructions to start a new religion. When Slocum became ill again several months later, his wife, Mary, began to shake and tremble uncontrollably in prayer. Soon afterward, Slocum recovered, and his healing was attributed to Mary's convulsions. The religion is thus named for the shaking of members during religious congregations. The shaking is purported to have healing powers.

The story is told that Mary had sent for a casket. John was dead. The casket was brought by canoe, down the river. The casket was just coming around the bend in the river when John revived, and told the people he had met Jesus and what they were to do.

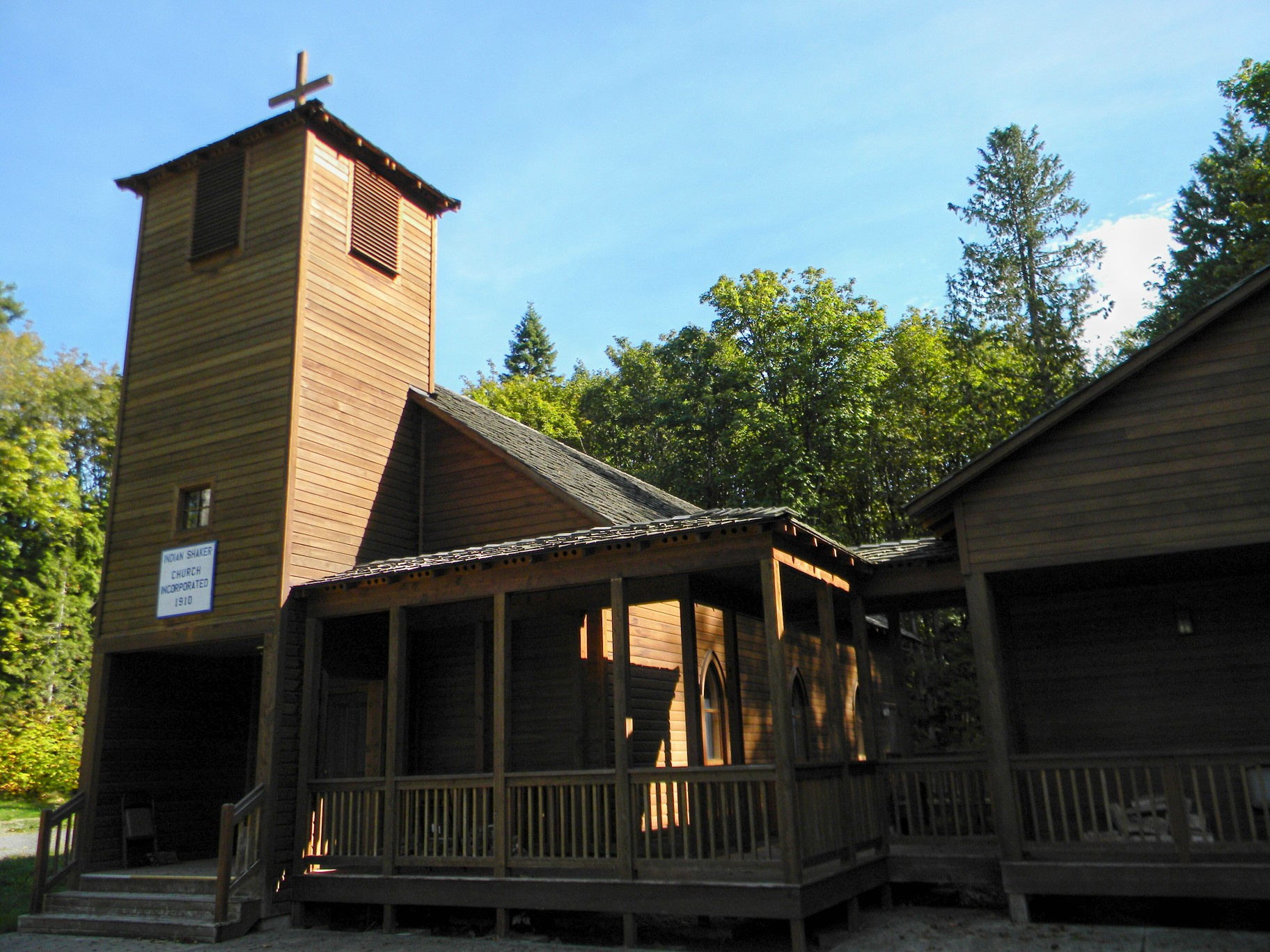
The Indian Shaker Church in Marysville, Washington.

The first church was built at Mud Bay outside Olympia, Washington near the homes of church co-founders and brothers Mud Bay Louie and Mud Bay Sam.

Indian Shakers originally rejected the Bible and all other written scriptures, and instead relied on direct communication between God and the individual. Such Shakers believe that the experience of the Gospel does not require a book, but rather is encoded in the mind and soul in accordance with the will of God. The religion began to be practiced by many unrelated peoples along the Northwest Coast of North America, such as the Klallam, Quinault, Lower Chehalis, Yakama, Hoh, Quileute, Wiyot, Yurok, and Hupa, among others.

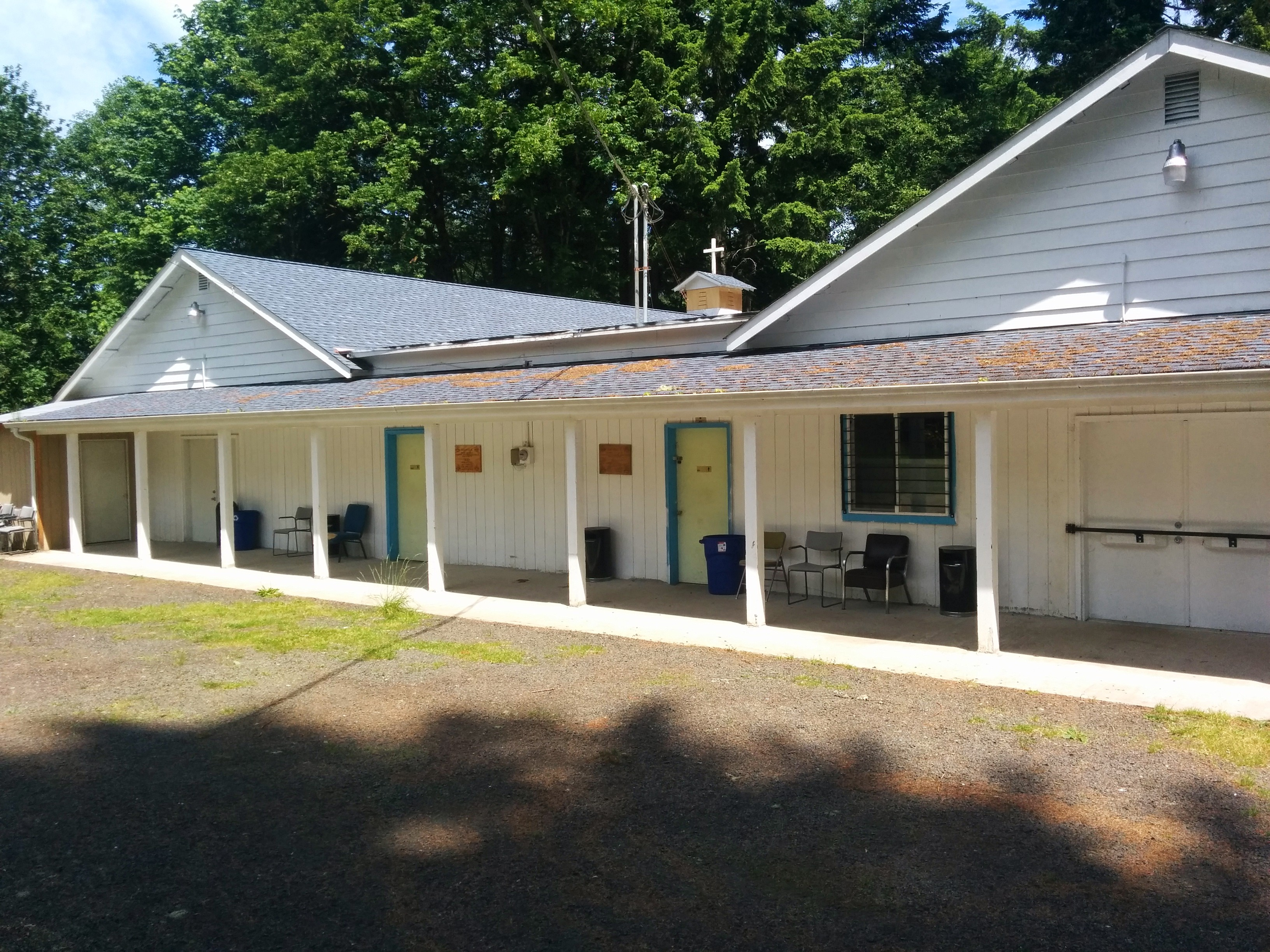
The second Indian Shaker Church at Mud Bay, built 1910 on the same property as the first 1890s Indian Shaker Church structure, 21 May 2015.

Practices reflecting Catholic influence include the use of hand-held candles, the ringing of individual hand bells (to a very loud volume), and the sign of the cross (usually repeated three times). Protestant influence is shown in public testifying and confession of shortcomings. Native elements include brushing or stroking to remove evil influence, counter-clockwise movement of service participants around the room (often with loud stomping), and spontaneous reception of songs from the spirit. Church members are expected to refrain from using alcohol and tobacco. Carefulness, kindness, and supplication to God for help are emphasized.

The new religion encountered much opposition and hostility from Euro-Americans. As had happened with the Ghost Dance, there was much misunderstanding and Anglos feared an Indian uprising. For a time, all Indian religious practices were banned by law, and the Indian Shakers were included. Many members were imprisoned and chained for their practices. Powell et al. (1976) show two notices posted by the US Indian Service at Quileute Reservation:

Notice to the Shakers: You are hereby permitted to hold meetings ... under the following conditions: on Sundays not longer than three (3) hours at one time and on Wednesdays not longer than two (2) hours at one time. The following REGULATIONS to be observed: 1st, Keep windows or a door open during all meetings. 2nd, Use only one bell to give signals. Not continuous ringing. 3rd, Do not admit school children at night meetings. It has been reported ... that there are some women who are violating the Rules ... and that they shake at all hours of the day and night. You will therefore tell the women quietly to stop shaking at any other times than the times specified in the rules ... If they do not stop, ... you will lock them up until they agree to stop. Shaking of the sick must not be allowed ... We do not want any trouble in this matter if it is possible to avoid it; but that 'continual and private shaking' must be stopped. (Note: Powell et al. 1976, cited in Bright 1984)

During the latter part of the 20th century, the denomination had 20 congregations with about 2,000 members. In the 1960s, a break occurred among Indian Shakers in which one "conservative" faction continued to reject written religious material while another "progressive" faction was more tolerant of the use of the Bible and other written material.

Indian Shakers continue to practice on the Northwest Coast in Washington, Oregon, California, and British Columbia.

== See also ==
- List of Indian Shaker Church buildings in Washington
- New religious movement
