= Camp Gallagher =

Summer camp in Lakebay, Washington, US

Coordinates: 47.25°N 122.83°W

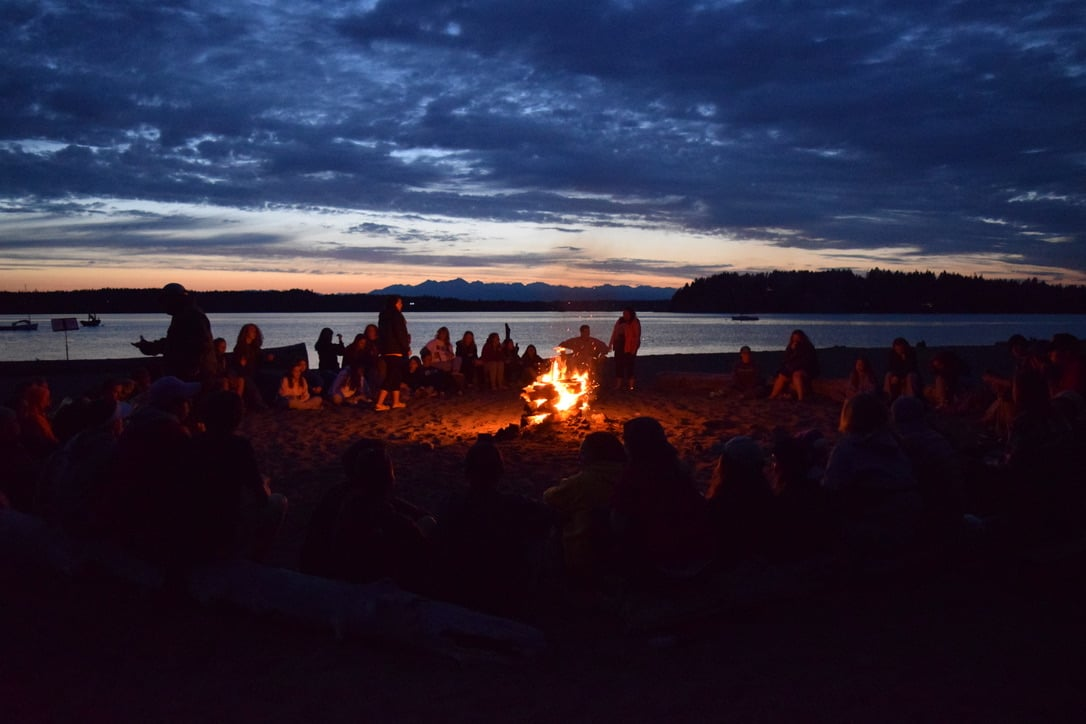
- Campfire at Camp Gallagher
- Company type: Nonprofit
- Industry: Youth Summer Camping
- Founded: 1970
- Headquarters: Lakebay, Washington, United States
- Key people: Patrick D'Amelio (President, Board of Directors)
- Website: http://campgallagher.org

Camp Gallagher is a co-ed overnight summer camp primarily for middle schoolers and high schoolers located on Case Inlet in Lakebay, Washington. It was founded in 1970.

Camp Gallagher is operated by Friends of Camp Gallagher, a non-religious, community-based nonprofit, and is accredited by the American Camping Association.

== Location ==
Camp Gallagher is located on 155 acres of land in the South Puget Sound. The grounds are made up of a sand beach, grassy areas and forest. It is situated due west of both Harstine Island and McMicken Island, and off the southeast corner of Herron Island.

== History ==
=== CYO Era (1963–2015) ===
In 1963, the Archdiocese of Seattle's Catholic Youth Organization (CYO) began using Camp Gallagher as short trip destination for campers attending Camp Blanchet. The CYO officially established Camp Gallagher as a summer camp in 1970.

=== Camp Closure and Sale (2010–2015) ===
The Seattle Archdiocese closed Camp Gallagher in Fall 2010 and, in 2015, announced it was selling the property. Following the announcement, former Camp Gallagher campers, parents and staff members launched an effort to buy and reopen the camp. On July 30, 2015, the property was sold to a party previously unaffiliated with Camp Gallagher. The new owners agreed to lease the property to the group that had been campaigning to save the camp. The group formed the Friends of Camp Gallagher nonprofit in 2015.

The Seattle Archdiocese used money from the sale of Camp Gallagher to fund a new aquatic center at one of its remaining camps.

=== Friends of Camp Gallagher Era (2015–present) ===
Friends of Camp Gallagher re-opened Camp Gallagher for Classic Summer Camp, Gallagher Expeditions, Family Camp, Men's Camp and Women's Camp in June 2016.

== Programs ==
=== Classic Summer Camp ===
Camp Gallagher's primary camping program is made up of six to nine day sessions, wherein middle school or high school aged campers stay overnight in cabins, eat meals in a communal dining hall and engage in summer camp activities like arts and crafts, boating and hiking

=== Other programs ===
Gallagher Expeditions
Family Camp
Grownup Camp
