= Case Inlet steamboats =

Steamboats serving Washington, United States

Case Inlet Steamboats
- Locale: south Puget Sound
- Waterway: Case Inlet
- Began operation: 1870s
- Ended operation: 1924

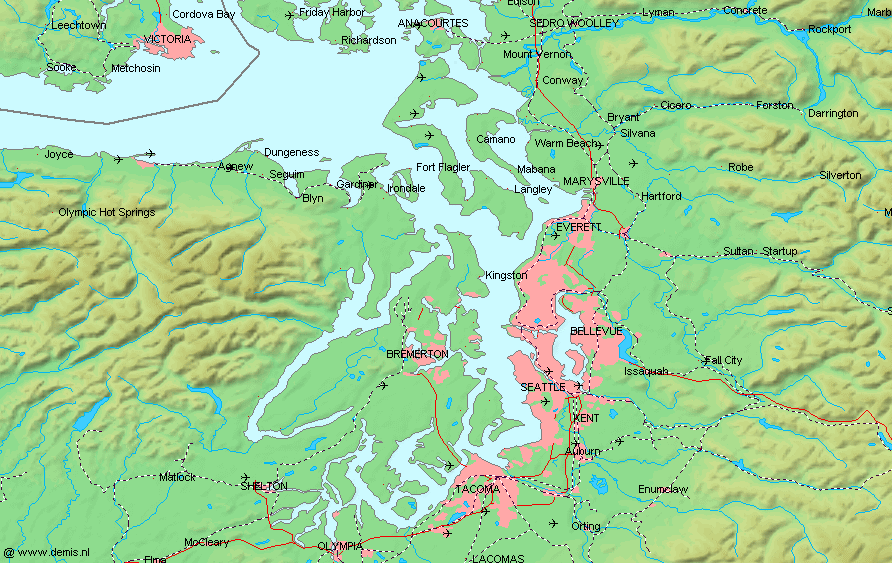
Puget Sound Map

Case Inlet steamboats served the small communities along the shore of Case Inlet in southern Puget Sound from the 1870s to 1924.

== Geography ==
Case Inlet runs in northerly direction from the Nisqually Reach and divides the Key Peninsula on the east side of the inlet from Hartstine Island and the Kitsap Peninsula on the west side of the inlet.

== Communities served ==
Steamboats served communities all along the inlet. Among others, these included, on the Key Peninsula, from north to south, Victor, Rock Bay, Vaughn, Dutcher's Cove, Herron and Herron Island, Whiteman Cove, and Taylor Bay.

On the west side of inlet, from north to south on the Kitsap Peninsula, the communities included Allyn, Eberhardt Float, Grapeview, and Stretch Island. South of Stretch Island, Pickering Passage separates Hartstine Island from the Kitsap Peninsula. On Case Inlet, on the east side of Hartstine Island, was the small community of Ballow and also Cowans Landing.

Vaughn in particular became an important steamboat terminal for the north end of the Key Peninsula. A day when the steamboat was scheduled to arrive was known locally as a "Boat Day." Vaughn was located near a small inlet known as Vaughn Bay which was separated from Case Inlet by a sandbar. Freight and passengers bound for Vaughn had to be lightered over the sandbar as there was insufficient depth of water to allow a steamboat to pass. Later a dock was constructed which resolved the problem.

Smaller steamboats also were constructed at Case Inlet ports, E.M. Gill, built at Vaughn in 1895, and Detroit (81 ft or 24.7 m, 97 gross tons), built at Detroit (now Grapeview), in 1889.

There was a landing on Stretch Island, called Eckert's Landing, for a winery on the island, which, during Prohibition, became a grape juice factory.

== Type of service ==
Vessels employed on case inlet were generally smaller and engaged in general purpose work, such as the transport of passengers, construction supplies, and groceries. They also did towing work on occasion.

== Vessels on the route ==
Vessels on the route included E.M.Gill (built 1895, 63 ft or 19.2 m, 21 gross tons (GT)) Maggie Yarro (built 1891 34 ft or 10.4 m, 19 GT), Orion, Capitol (steam scow, built 1878 54 ft or 16.5 m, 54 GT), Clara, the sternwheeler Old Settler (built 1878 60 ft or 18.3 m), Arrow (built 1883, 45 ft or 13.7 m), Seaside, (built 1885, 45 ft or 13.7 m, 31 GT), White Cap, and Colby (built 1902, 35 ft or 10.7 m).

The somewhat larger sternwheeler Tyconda (built 1895 104 ft or 31.7 m, 186 GT), also ran up to Vaughn, where the shallow draft of the sternwheeler made loading and unloading easier, as the vessel could come close in to the shore.

Adam Ervin Cowan, the founder of Cowan's Landing, operated two boats which served Harstine Island, Lavina, named after his wife, and Leota, named after his daughter. Cowans was killed in a boatyard accident in 1918, when the supports under Lavina gave way, and he was crushed by the hull.

== Termination of service ==
In 1924 Ariel made the last steamer run from Tacoma to Allyn, Washington. Local service may have continued longer. It is reported that in 1923, Glen Harriman, using an ex-navy vessel he renamed Loren (54 ft or 16.5 m) after his daughter, begin making runs three times weekly from Case Inlet to Olympia, with stops at Allyn, Vaughn, and Hartstine and Squaxin islands.
