= South Puget Sound =

Region in Washington, United States

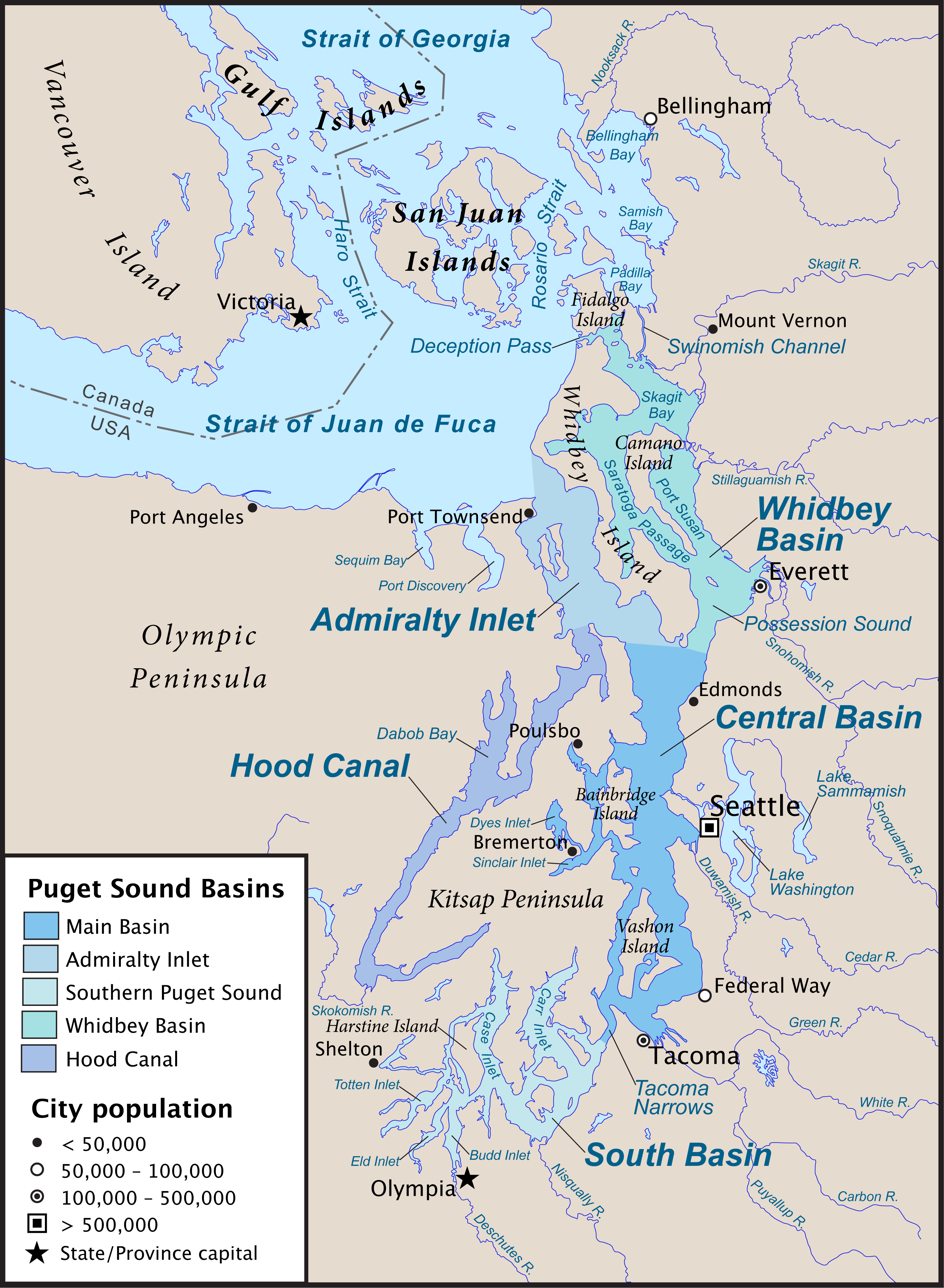
South Basin (lightest blue) marked on a map of Puget Sound

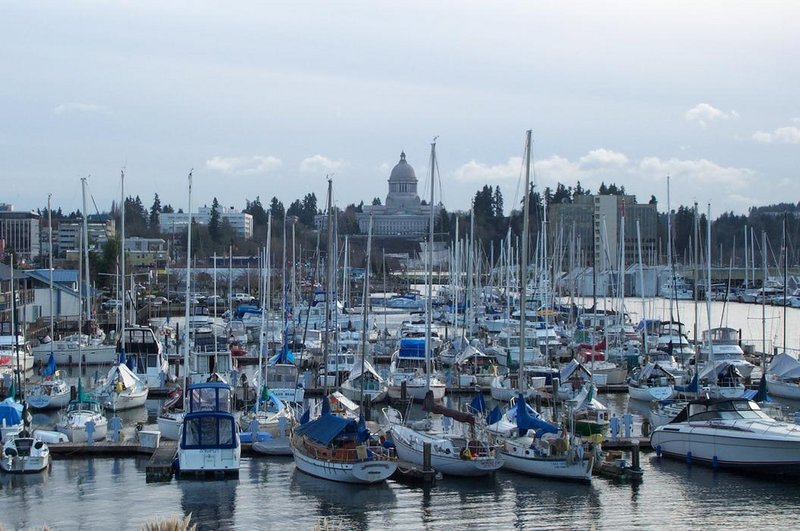
Olympia at the southern end of Budd Inlet

South Puget Sound is the southern reaches of Puget Sound in Southwest Washington, in the United States' Pacific Northwest. It is one of five major basins encompassing the entire Sound, and the shallowest basin, with a mean depth of 37 meters (121 ft). Exact definitions of the region vary: (Note: Neither is there agreement on the boundaries of Puget Sound itself between scientists, geographers and lawmakers.) the state's Department of Fish and Wildlife counts all of Puget Sound south of the Tacoma Narrows for fishing regulatory purposes. The same agency counts Mason, Jefferson, Kitsap, Pierce and Thurston Counties for wildlife management. The state's Department of Ecology defines a similar area south of Colvos Passage. (Note: "The South Puget Sound planning area is made up of numerous inlets and bays extending from Colvos Passage to Totten Inlet. The South Puget Sound area includes Case Inlet, Budd Inlet, Ed Inlet, Carr Inlet, Hammersly Inlet, Henderson Inlet and several other small areas. Oakland Bay, Pickering Passage, Hale Passage, Peale Passage, Dana Passage, Drayton Passage, Balch Passage, Nisqually Reach and North Bay are also covered." (Washington Department of Ecology))

The term "South Sound Region" or just "South Sound" is used to apply to the communities surrounding the water. (Note: "Thurston County is located on the southern end of Puget Sound in Western Washington, referred to as the South Sound." (Washington Employment Security Department)) The South Sound contains the Olympia-Lacey-Tumwater Metropolitan Statistical Area, Tacoma and its Pierce County suburbs, and the Shelton Micropolitan Statistical Area. The terms appear in names of local institutions and commercial entities such as South Puget Sound Community College in Olympia and South Sound Center in Lacey.

== Human history ==
Archaeology indicates that continuous human occupation began approximately ten thousand years ago by the Coast Salish peoples who still live there. Lieutenant Peter Puget perhaps made first contact with the indigenous peoples and first charted the South Sound in the 1790s, giving rise to the original "Puget's Sound", which was then just the area south of the Narrows. Fort Nisqually was established in 1832, and Fort Steilacoom became the territorial militia headquarters in August 1849. Both preceded by decades Fort Lewis (now Joint Base Lewis-McChord), which was created for World War I. The Medicine Creek Treaty between the tribes and the United States was signed in 1854 at the Nisqually River delta in the South Sound area, when settlers from other parts of America began to arrive.

Olympia became a settlement in the 1840s, providing access to inland areas in Southwest Washington. Tumwater pioneers Michael Simmons, born in Kentucky, and George Washington Bush, a multiracial War of 1812 veteran from Pennsylvania, were among the first Puget Sound settlers from the United States in 1844. Simmons and Bush likely hacked a path through virgin forest from the Oregon Trail. In 1860 the route was made into a military road between Fort Vancouver on the Columbia to Forts Nisqually and Steilacoom on the Sound.

The Indian Shaker Church was founded in 1881 at Mud Bay by Native Americans "Mud Bay" Sam Yowaluch and "Mud Bay" Louie Yowaluch, and John Slocum of the Squaxin Island Tribe. The church spread throughout the Northwest United States and Southern British Columbia in the 19th century, and still exists as of 2017.

The 20th century was characterized by rapid development and urbanization on the shores of the South Sound.

== Geography ==
South Puget Sound navigation chart showing shoreline complexity

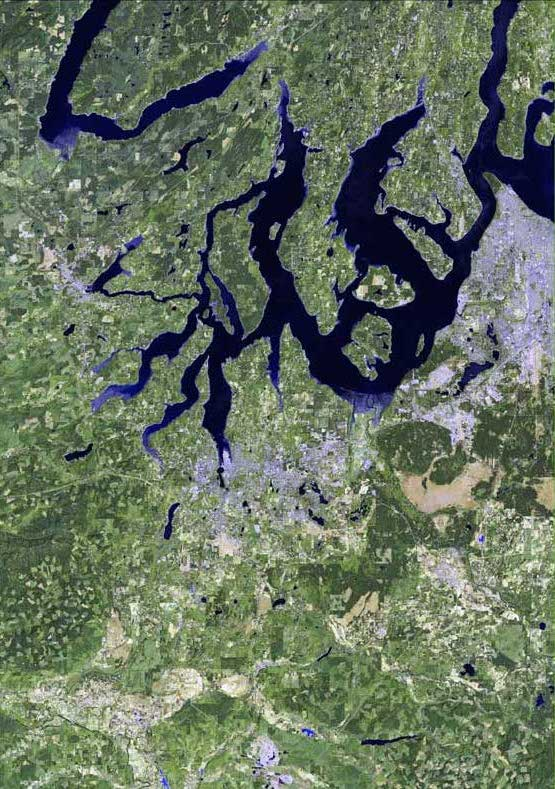
True color satellite image of same region

The passages and inlets west of Hartstene Island, due to extensive Pleistocene glaciation, contain the shallowest water of the entire Sound. Away from the Tacoma Narrows, the basin has low rates of tidal exchange (tidal flushing), leading to issues with eutrophication. Shoreline complexity is greater in the South Sound than in the other basins, due to the many passages, inlets and islands:

Passages

- Pickering Passage
- Peale Passage
- Dana Passage
- Squaxin Passage

Inlets

- Hammersley Inlet and Oakland Bay
- Totten Inlet
  - Skookum Inlet
- Eld Inlet
- Budd Inlet
- Henderson Inlet
- Case Inlet

Islands

- Fox Island
- McNeil Island
- Anderson Island
- Hartstene Island
- Steamboat Island

=== Mudflats ===
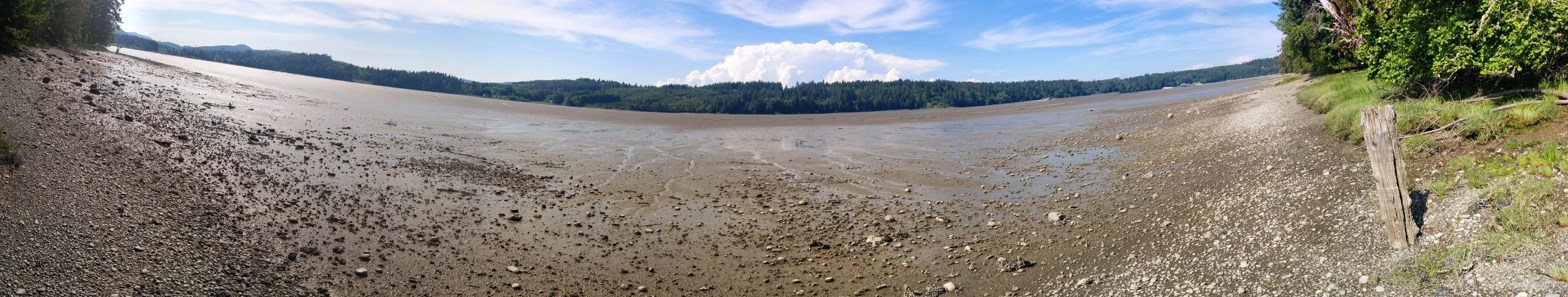
Oyster Bay mudflats

Great tidal variation gives rise to extensive mudflats in the inlets of the South Sound. (Note: "Mudflats are common along the Nisqually River delta, in the shallow headwaters at the north ends of Case and Carr inlets, and extensively in the heads of the small inlets at the southwest.") Tidal variation increases with distance from the entrance to Puget Sound and is greatest at 15+ feet in the South Sound, versus only 11 in Seattle (compare 5 in Los Angeles). Mudflats include the Mud Bay region at the southern end of Eld Inlet and Oyster Bay at the southern end of Totten Inlet. The entirety of Oyster Bay is exposed mud at low tide.

=== Watersheds ===
Major watersheds in the South Sound include the Deschutes River (Washington) and the Nisqually River.

=== Microclimate ===
The Chehalis Gap brings Pacific moist air to the entire Puget Sound area, arriving first in the South Sound (the gap near Matlock is 15 miles (24 km) from Shelton on Oakland Bay). Olympia is wetter than Seattle due to the absence of protection from the Olympic Mountains, and has been reckoned the rainiest city in America with 64 days of rain a year.

== Aquaculture ==
Aquaculture in the South Sound produces much of the state's commercial shellfish harvest. Oyster farming in Totten Inlet and its side branch, Little Skookum, produce the best known edible oysters in the South Puget Sound. Geoduck production leads the nation. (Note: A single Mason County producer contributes 700,000 pounds (320,000 kg), or nearly half of the 1,600,000-pound (730,000 kg) national geoduck harvest.)

== Governments ==
Jurisdictions in the South Sound include the state government and subordinate counties and cities; Nisqually, Squaxin Island, and Puyallup Tribes; and the federal government which is a landowner and operator of Joint Base Lewis-McChord.

== Transportation ==
Highway network surrounding the South Sound. I-5 dark blue, U.S. 101 red, SR 3 orange, SR 16 orange and light blue

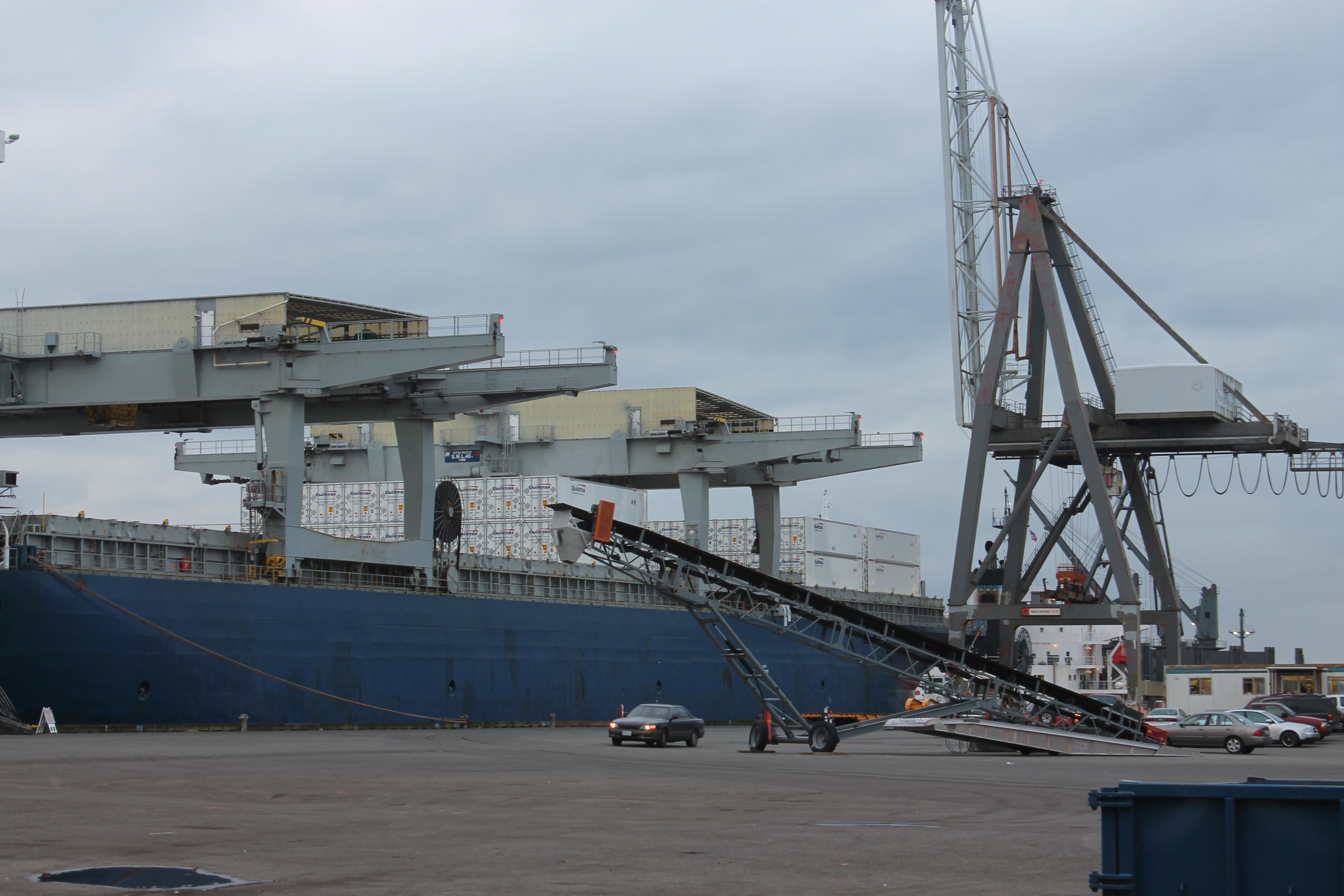
Pacific Ocean container ship and crane at Port of Olympia

Transportation by water was once common in the South Sound. Ferries once linked many locations such as Steilacoom. The Steilacoom-Anderson Island Ferry provides service between Steilacoom and South Sound islands using two vessels. The north end of the South Sound region has the only cross-Sound bridge, the Tacoma Narrows Bridge (technically two adjacent bridges since 2007). Interstate 5 and U.S. 101 form a semicircular pathway from Shelton to Tacoma around the South Sound, and Washington State Route 3 runs up from Shelton through the center of the Kitsap Peninsula. State Route 16 across the Narrows Bridge completes a loop around the South Sound. Dead end county roads traverse the length of the southernmost peninsulas in the Totten Inlet-Eld Inlet-Budd Inlet area: Kamilche Point Road, Steamboat Island Road, Cooper Point Road, Libby Road, and Johnson Point Road.

The Port of Olympia is a deepwater port for oceangoing vessels. It is sustained by dredging in Budd Inlet and Capitol Lake, an impoundment of the Deschutes River. Without dredging, the Deschutes would recreate its historical estuary with annual 35,000 cubic yards (27,000 m^{3}) of sediment deposit. (Note: "Since 1951, only minimal sediment amounts have entered Budd Inlet as a result of the dam. These maritime industries [Port of Olympia, yacht club and marina] do not need to dredge as often as they once did." (Dani Madrone, Deschutes Estuary Restoration Team))

Tacoma Rail, BNSF Railway, Union Pacific Railroad support general rail freight, and a little-used, 48-mile (77 km) Puget Sound and Pacific Railroad spur to the Kitsap Peninsula exists. Historically, logging railroads such as Mud Bay Logging Company were common on the South Sound shores and inland; these have been abandoned.

Sanderson Field in Shelton and Olympia Regional Airport are the only major public airports (see List of airports in Washington (state)). Large military airfields exist onboard Joint Base Lewis-McChord.

== Marine mammals ==
Gray and humpback whales are rare in the South Sound but have been known to come there to feed and perhaps shelter whale calves. Southern resident killer whales (orcas) have been reported as far south as Eld Inlet. Smaller species include Dall's porpoise (Phocoenoides Dalli), harbor seals (Phoca Vitulina) and the Pacific harbor porpoise (Phocoena phocoena). A single sea otter was sighted in the South Sound in 2012.
