= Puget Sound region =

Coastal area in the U.S. state of Washington

Coordinates: 47.6°N 122.4°W

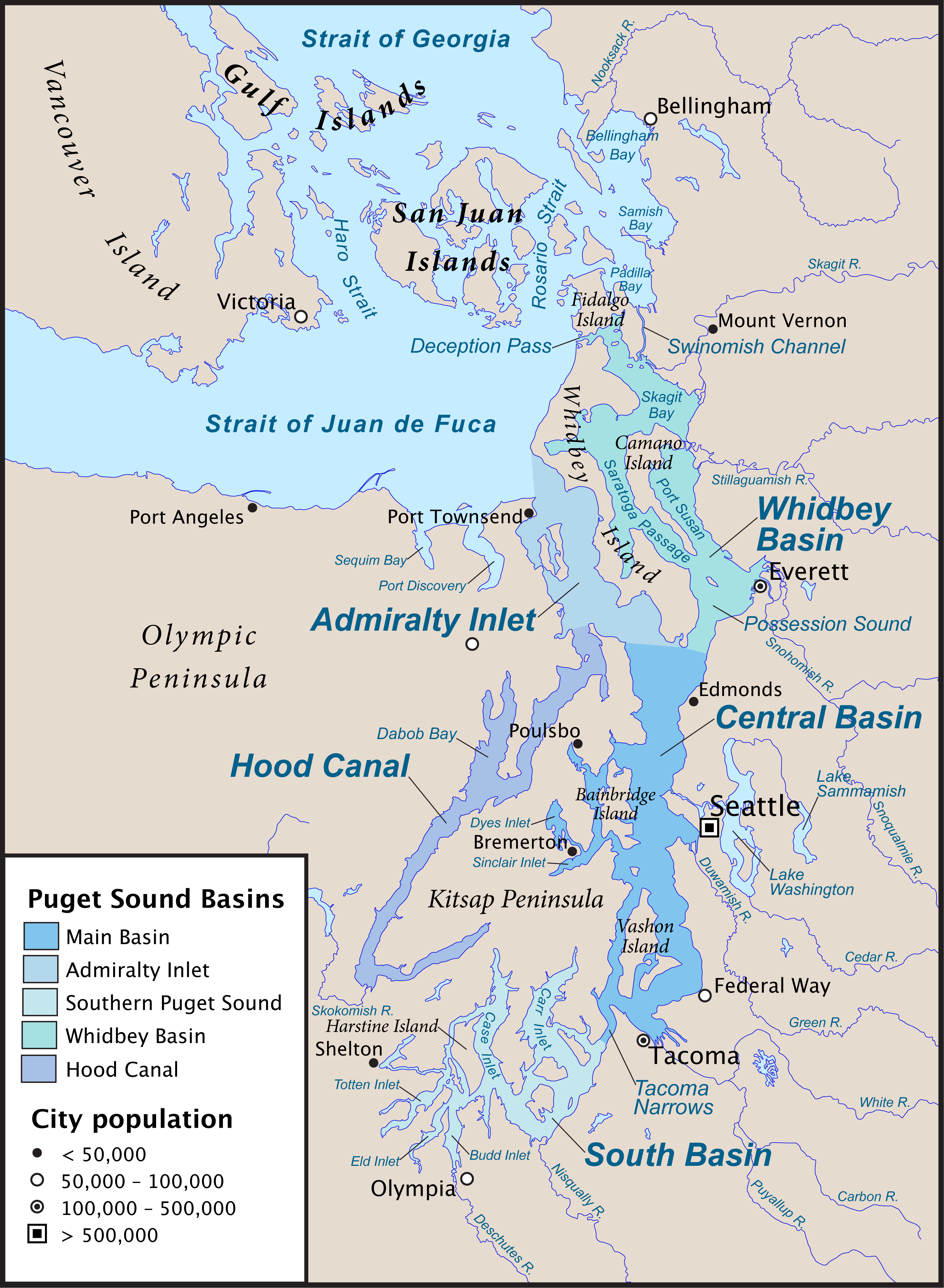
- Puget Sound, its basins, and major surrounding cities
- Country: United States
- State: Washington
- Core cities: Seattle; Tacoma; Bellevue; Everett
- Highest elevation Mount Rainier: 14,411 ft (4,392 m)
- Lowest elevation Sea level: 0 ft (0 m)
- Time zone: UTC−08:00 (Pacific)
  - Summer (DST): UTC−07:00 (PDT)
- Area codes: 206, 253, 360, 425, 564

The Puget Sound region is a coastal area of the Pacific Northwest in the U.S. state of Washington, including Puget Sound, the Puget Sound lowlands, and the surrounding region roughly west of the Cascade Range and east of the Olympic Mountains. It is characterized by a complex array of saltwater bays, islands, and peninsulas carved out by prehistoric glaciers.

Poet Robert Sund called the Puget Sound region "Ish River country", owing to its numerous rivers with names ending in "ish", such as the Duwamish, Samish, Sammamish, Skokomish, Skykomish, Snohomish, and the Stillaguamish. The ish ending is from Salishan languages and means "people of".

== History ==
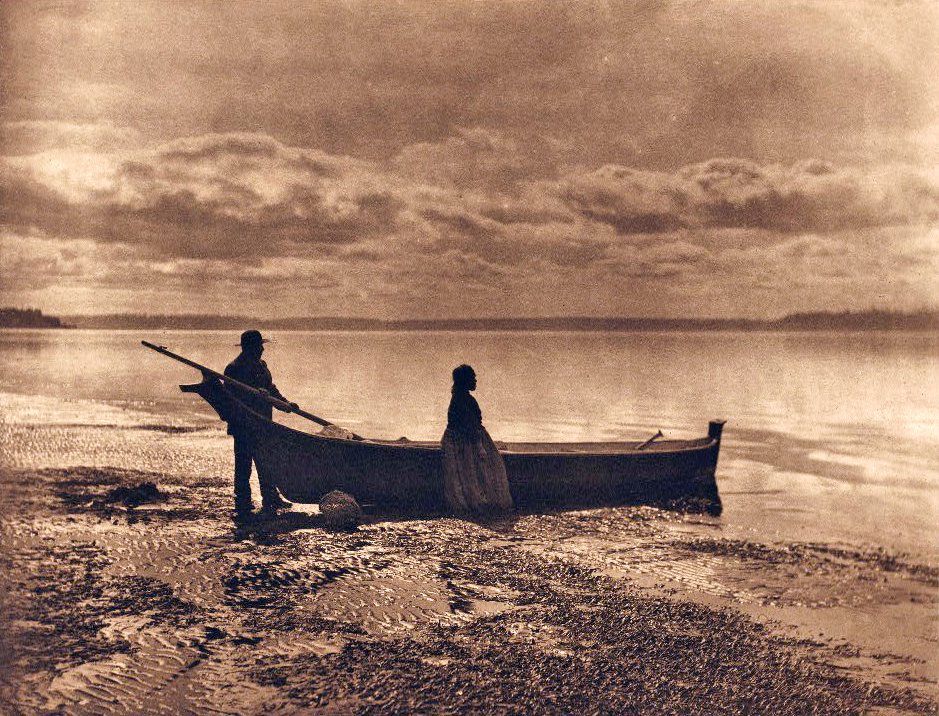
Evening on Puget Sound by Edward S. Curtis, 1913

The Puget Sound region was formed by the collision and attachment of many terranes ("microcontinents") to the North American plate between about 50 to 10 million years ago. About 15,000 years ago during the Vashon Glaciation, the Puget Sound region was covered by a lobe of the Cordilleran ice sheet. The glacier that covered the area was about 3,000 feet (900 m) thick within the vicinity of Seattle. By the time Captain George Vancouver found the Sound in 1792, early native people had already been there for over 5,000 years.

Logging started as early as 1853. In the 1880s logging railroads cut their way into Puget Sound. 1886 the St. Helens fire burned 300,000 acres (1,200 km^{2}). Mount Rainier National Park started in 1899. The 1902 Yacolt Burn burned 600,000 acres (2,400 km^{2}). Olympic National Park was established in 1938.

George Vancouver explored Puget sound in 1792. Vancouver claimed it for Great Britain on June 4, 1792, naming it for one of his officers, Lieutenant Peter Puget. It became part of the Oregon Country, and became U.S. territory when the 1846 Oregon Treaty was signed.

After arriving along the Oregon Trail, many people traveled north to what is now Washington and settled the Puget Sound area. The first non-indigenous settlement was New Market (now known as Tumwater) in 1846. In 1853 Washington Territory was formed from part of Oregon Territory. In 1888 the Northern Pacific railroad line reached Puget Sound, linking the region to eastern states.

For a long period Tacoma was noted for its large smelters where gold, silver, copper and lead ores were treated. Seattle was the primary port for trade with Alaska and the rest of the country and for a time possessed a large shipbuilding industry. The region around eastern Puget Sound developed heavy industry during the period including World War I and World War II, and the Boeing Company became established in the area.

During World War II the Puget Sound area became a focus for the war industry, with Boeing producing many of the nation's heavy bombers and the ports of Seattle, Bremerton and Tacoma available for shipbuilding. The most important yards in the Sound during World War II were Seattle-Tacoma Shipbuilding's Seattle and Tacoma yards, also known as Todd Pacific, Todd Seattle and Todd Tacoma and the Puget Sound Navy Yard. They produced a significant portion of destroyers and escort carriers. Smaller operations included Winslow, Associated Shipbuilders and the Lake Washington Shipyard.

Since 1995, Puget Sound has been recognized as an American Viticultural Area by the Alcohol and Tobacco Tax and Trade Bureau.

== Political geography ==
The Seattle metropolitan area is shown in light blue. The Combined Statistical Area consists of both the blue and gold areas.

The urban region designated the Puget Sound Region is centered on Seattle and consists of nine counties, two urban center cities and four satellite cities making up what has been dubbed "Pugetopolis." Both urban core cities have large industrial areas and seaports plus a high-rise central business district. The satellite cities are primarily suburban, featuring a small downtown core and a small industrial area or port. The suburbs consist mostly of residences, strip malls, and shopping centers. The region is also home to numerous ports. The two largest and busiest are the Port of Seattle and Port of Tacoma, which, if combined, comprise the third largest container port in North America after Los Angeles/Long Beach and New York/New Jersey.

As defined by the U.S. Census Bureau and the Office of Management and Budget, the Seattle metropolitan area is officially the Seattle–Tacoma–Bellevue, WA metropolitan statistical area (MSA) and consists of:

- Everett metropolitan division
  - Snohomish County: north of Seattle
- Seattle–Bellevue–Kent metropolitan division
  - King County: Seattle and its immediate vicinity
- Tacoma–Lakewood metropolitan division
  - Pierce County: south of Seattle

Based on commuting patterns, the adjacent metropolitan areas of Olympia, Bremerton, and Mount Vernon, along with a few smaller satellite urban areas, are grouped together in a wider labor market region known as the Seattle–Tacoma combined statistical area (CSA), which encompasses most of the Puget Sound region. The population of this wider region is 4,269,349—almost two-thirds of Washington's population—as of 2012. The Seattle CSA is the 12th largest CSA, and the 13th largest primary census statistical area in the country. The additional metropolitan and micropolitan areas included are:

- Bremerton–Silverdale–Port Orchard metropolitan area
  - Kitsap County: west of Seattle, separated from the city by Puget Sound; connected to Seattle by ferry and to Tacoma by the Tacoma Narrows Bridge
- Centralia micropolitan area
  - Lewis County: south of Olympia
- Mount Vernon–Anacortes metropolitan area
  - Skagit County
- Oak Harbor micropolitan area
  - Island County: northwest of Everett, encompassing Whidbey and Camano Islands in Puget Sound
- Olympia–Lacey–Tumwater metropolitan area
  - Thurston County: southwest of Seattle, at the south end of Puget Sound
- Shelton micropolitan area
  - Mason County: west of Tacoma and northwest of Olympia

A state-run ferry system, Washington State Ferries, connects the larger islands to the Washington mainland, as well as both sides of the sound, allowing cars and people to move about the greater Puget Sound region.

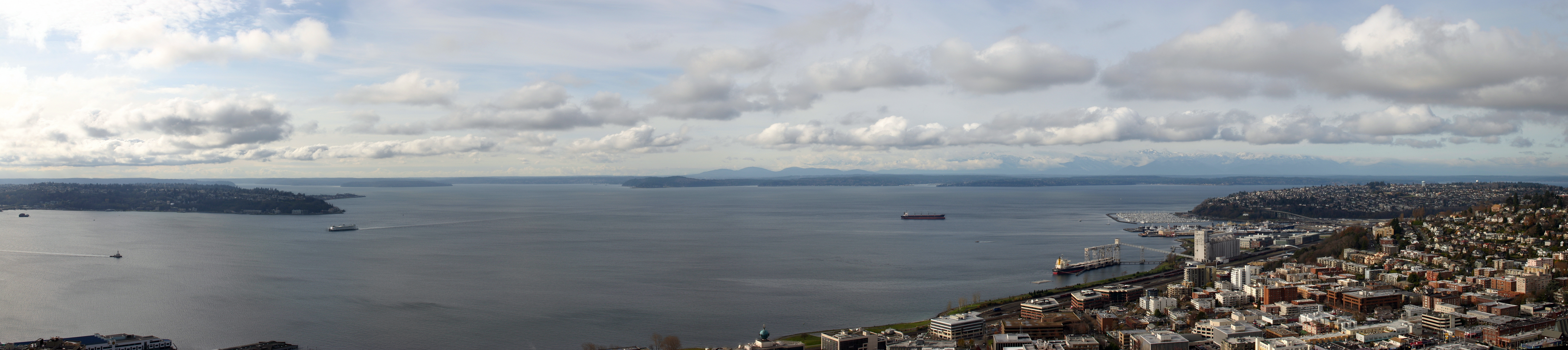
View of Puget Sound from the Space Needle

== Climate ==
The region has a Csb (warm summer mediterranean) climate with some areas in the far east (western foothills of the Cascades) having an oceanic (Cfb) climate if the 30 millimetres (1.2 in) isohyet is used. The wet season is from October to April and is due to the Aleutian Low coming in from the northwest, and variation in winter rain from year to year is mostly due to variation in the strength of the Aleutian Low (strong = dry and weak = wet). The dry season (May-Sep) is caused by a subtropical high moving north from California. The driest part of the region is in the rain shadow of the Olympic Mountains around Sequim and Whidbey Island, receiving 40-75 cm of precipitation per year. The wettest part is in the foothills of both the Cascade and the Olympic Mts, and on the west side of the Sound, receiving 125-1000+ cm of precipitation per year.

Climate data for Seattle (SeaTac Airport), 1991–2020 normals, (Note: Mean monthly maxima and minima (i.e. the highest and lowest temperature readings during an entire month or year) calculated based on data at said location from 1991 to 2020.) extremes 1894–present (Note: Official records are restricted to SeaTac Airport from January 1945 onward.)
| Month | Jan | Feb | Mar | Apr | May | Jun | Jul | Aug | Sep | Oct | Nov | Dec | Year |
|---|---|---|---|---|---|---|---|---|---|---|---|---|---|
| Record high °F (°C) | 67 (19) | 70 (21) | 79 (26) | 89 (32) | 93 (34) | 108 (42) | 103 (39) | 99 (37) | 98 (37) | 89 (32) | 74 (23) | 66 (19) | 108 (42) |
| Mean maximum °F (°C) | 57.0 (13.9) | 59.1 (15.1) | 66.4 (19.1) | 74.3 (23.5) | 81.9 (27.7) | 85.8 (29.9) | 91.2 (32.9) | 89.9 (32.2) | 84.1 (28.9) | 72.0 (22.2) | 61.6 (16.4) | 56.8 (13.8) | 94.1 (34.5) |
| Mean daily maximum °F (°C) | 48.0 (8.9) | 50.3 (10.2) | 54.2 (12.3) | 59.3 (15.2) | 66.3 (19.1) | 71.1 (21.7) | 77.4 (25.2) | 77.6 (25.3) | 71.6 (22.0) | 60.5 (15.8) | 52.1 (11.2) | 47.0 (8.3) | 61.3 (16.3) |
| Daily mean °F (°C) | 42.8 (6.0) | 44.0 (6.7) | 47.1 (8.4) | 51.3 (10.7) | 57.5 (14.2) | 62.0 (16.7) | 67.1 (19.5) | 67.4 (19.7) | 62.6 (17.0) | 53.8 (12.1) | 46.5 (8.1) | 42.0 (5.6) | 53.7 (12.1) |
| Mean daily minimum °F (°C) | 37.7 (3.2) | 37.7 (3.2) | 39.9 (4.4) | 43.3 (6.3) | 48.7 (9.3) | 53.0 (11.7) | 56.8 (13.8) | 57.2 (14.0) | 53.6 (12.0) | 47.0 (8.3) | 40.9 (4.9) | 37.1 (2.8) | 46.1 (7.8) |
| Mean minimum °F (°C) | 26.1 (−3.3) | 27.3 (−2.6) | 31.3 (−0.4) | 35.6 (2.0) | 40.6 (4.8) | 46.6 (8.1) | 51.5 (10.8) | 51.7 (10.9) | 45.8 (7.7) | 36.8 (2.7) | 29.2 (−1.6) | 25.4 (−3.7) | 21.5 (−5.8) |
| Record low °F (°C) | 0 (−18) | 1 (−17) | 11 (−12) | 29 (−2) | 28 (−2) | 38 (3) | 43 (6) | 44 (7) | 35 (2) | 28 (−2) | 6 (−14) | 6 (−14) | 0 (−18) |
| Average precipitation inches (mm) | 5.78 (147) | 3.76 (96) | 4.17 (106) | 3.18 (81) | 1.88 (48) | 1.45 (37) | 0.60 (15) | 0.97 (25) | 1.61 (41) | 3.91 (99) | 6.31 (160) | 5.72 (145) | 39.34 (999) |
| Average snowfall inches (cm) | 1.8 (4.6) | 2.2 (5.6) | 0.4 (1.0) | 0.0 (0.0) | 0.0 (0.0) | 0.0 (0.0) | 0.0 (0.0) | 0.0 (0.0) | 0.0 (0.0) | 0.0 (0.0) | 0.2 (0.51) | 1.7 (4.3) | 6.3 (16) |
| Average precipitation days (≥ 0.01 in) | 18.7 | 15.9 | 17.1 | 15.0 | 11.3 | 9.2 | 4.7 | 4.9 | 8.3 | 14.3 | 18.4 | 18.4 | 156.2 |
| Average snowy days (≥ 0.1 in) | 1.4 | 1.2 | 0.4 | 0.0 | 0.0 | 0.0 | 0.0 | 0.0 | 0.0 | 0.0 | 0.2 | 1.5 | 4.7 |
| Average relative humidity (%) | 78.0 | 75.2 | 73.6 | 71.4 | 68.9 | 67.1 | 65.4 | 68.2 | 73.2 | 78.6 | 79.8 | 80.1 | 73.3 |
| Average dew point °F (°C) | 33.1 (0.6) | 35.1 (1.7) | 36.3 (2.4) | 38.8 (3.8) | 43.5 (6.4) | 48.2 (9.0) | 51.4 (10.8) | 52.7 (11.5) | 50.2 (10.1) | 45.1 (7.3) | 38.8 (3.8) | 34.3 (1.3) | 42.3 (5.7) |
| Mean monthly sunshine hours | 69.8 | 108.8 | 178.4 | 207.3 | 253.7 | 268.4 | 312.0 | 281.4 | 221.7 | 142.6 | 72.7 | 52.9 | 2,169.7 |
| Percentage possible sunshine | 25 | 38 | 48 | 51 | 54 | 56 | 65 | 64 | 59 | 42 | 26 | 20 | 49 |
| Average ultraviolet index | 0.8 | 1.5 | 2.8 | 4.5 | 6.0 | 6.9 | 7.3 | 6.2 | 4.4 | 2.3 | 1.1 | 0.7 | 3.7 |
Source 1: NOAA (relative humidity, dew point and sun 1961–1990)
Source 2: UV Index Today (1995 to 2022)

Climate data for Olympia Regional Airport, Washington (1991−2020 normals, extremes 1948−present)
| Month | Jan | Feb | Mar | Apr | May | Jun | Jul | Aug | Sep | Oct | Nov | Dec | Year |
|---|---|---|---|---|---|---|---|---|---|---|---|---|---|
| Record high °F (°C) | 64 (18) | 73 (23) | 79 (26) | 88 (31) | 96 (36) | 110 (43) | 104 (40) | 104 (40) | 98 (37) | 90 (32) | 74 (23) | 64 (18) | 110 (43) |
| Mean maximum °F (°C) | 56.3 (13.5) | 59.4 (15.2) | 67.9 (19.9) | 76.2 (24.6) | 83.9 (28.8) | 87.9 (31.1) | 93.6 (34.2) | 92.2 (33.4) | 86.3 (30.2) | 73.7 (23.2) | 61.5 (16.4) | 55.5 (13.1) | 96.0 (35.6) |
| Mean daily maximum °F (°C) | 46.0 (7.8) | 49.1 (9.5) | 53.7 (12.1) | 58.9 (14.9) | 66.1 (18.9) | 70.8 (21.6) | 77.6 (25.3) | 78.0 (25.6) | 72.1 (22.3) | 60.2 (15.7) | 50.6 (10.3) | 44.9 (7.2) | 60.7 (15.9) |
| Daily mean °F (°C) | 39.6 (4.2) | 40.7 (4.8) | 44.1 (6.7) | 48.2 (9.0) | 54.5 (12.5) | 59.1 (15.1) | 64.2 (17.9) | 64.2 (17.9) | 59.1 (15.1) | 50.3 (10.2) | 43.2 (6.2) | 38.9 (3.8) | 50.5 (10.3) |
| Mean daily minimum °F (°C) | 33.2 (0.7) | 32.3 (0.2) | 34.5 (1.4) | 37.5 (3.1) | 43.0 (6.1) | 47.4 (8.6) | 50.7 (10.4) | 50.5 (10.3) | 46.2 (7.9) | 40.5 (4.7) | 35.8 (2.1) | 32.8 (0.4) | 40.4 (4.7) |
| Mean minimum °F (°C) | 18.8 (−7.3) | 19.0 (−7.2) | 23.9 (−4.5) | 27.5 (−2.5) | 32.3 (0.2) | 38.4 (3.6) | 42.7 (5.9) | 41.9 (5.5) | 35.9 (2.2) | 27.9 (−2.3) | 21.6 (−5.8) | 18.4 (−7.6) | 12.6 (−10.8) |
| Record low °F (°C) | −8 (−22) | −1 (−18) | 9 (−13) | 23 (−5) | 25 (−4) | 30 (−1) | 35 (2) | 33 (1) | 25 (−4) | 14 (−10) | −1 (−18) | −7 (−22) | −8 (−22) |
| Average precipitation inches (mm) | 7.80 (198) | 5.09 (129) | 5.68 (144) | 3.67 (93) | 2.26 (57) | 1.46 (37) | 0.53 (13) | 0.96 (24) | 2.04 (52) | 5.07 (129) | 8.21 (209) | 7.85 (199) | 50.62 (1,286) |
| Average snowfall inches (cm) | 2.0 (5.1) | 0.6 (1.5) | 0.1 (0.25) | 0.0 (0.0) | 0.0 (0.0) | 0.0 (0.0) | 0.0 (0.0) | 0.0 (0.0) | 0.0 (0.0) | 0.0 (0.0) | 0.0 (0.0) | 1.2 (3.0) | 3.9 (9.9) |
| Average precipitation days (≥ 0.01 in) | 20.3 | 16.4 | 18.8 | 16.3 | 11.4 | 8.5 | 4.0 | 4.8 | 8.1 | 15.1 | 19.5 | 20.2 | 163.4 |
| Average snowy days (≥ 0.1 in) | 0.5 | 0.7 | 0.1 | 0.0 | 0.0 | 0.0 | 0.0 | 0.0 | 0.0 | 0.0 | 0.1 | 0.8 | 2.2 |
| Average relative humidity (%) | 87.5 | 84.5 | 80.0 | 75.6 | 72.9 | 72.4 | 70.8 | 72.1 | 77.6 | 85.1 | 88.4 | 89.1 | 79.7 |
| Average dew point °F (°C) | 34.5 (1.4) | 36.0 (2.2) | 36.9 (2.7) | 39.2 (4.0) | 43.9 (6.6) | 48.9 (9.4) | 52.0 (11.1) | 52.7 (11.5) | 49.6 (9.8) | 44.8 (7.1) | 39.6 (4.2) | 35.4 (1.9) | 42.8 (6.0) |
Source 1: NOAA (dew points and relative humidity 1961–1990)
Source 2: National Weather Service

== Flora and fauna ==
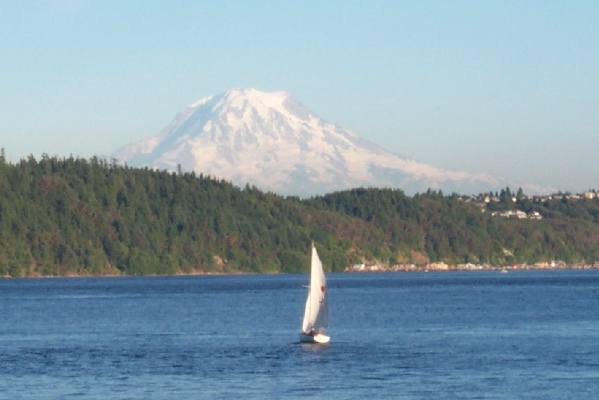
Snow-capped peaks are a backdrop to many Puget Sound scenes. Here, Mount Rainier is seen from Gig Harbor.

North Pacific Oak Woodland is one of the principal plant associations of the Puget Trough, where many of the soils are well drained mesic.

== Places ==
Counties of the Puget Sound region:

- Island County
- Jefferson County
- King County
- Kitsap County
- Mason County
- Pierce County
- Skagit County
- Snohomish County
- Thurston County

In addition, the San Juan Islands (all of San Juan County plus a few islands belonging to Whatcom County) are often considered part of the greater Puget Sound area.

Prominent islands:

- Anderson Island
- Bainbridge Island
- Blake Island
- Camano Island
- Fidalgo Island
- Fox Island
- Harstine Island
- Herron Island
- Indian Island
- Marrowstone Island
- Maury Island
- McNeil Island
- Mercer Island
- Squaxin Island
- Vashon Island
- Whidbey Island

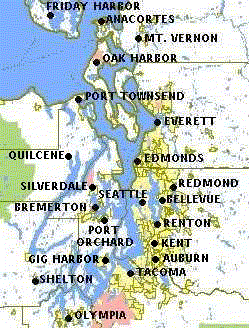
Puget Sound

Urban centers:

- Seattle
- Tacoma
- Olympia
- Everett

Satellite cities:

- Bellevue
- Bremerton

Other principal cities:

- Auburn
- Edmonds
- Federal Way
- Kent
- Kirkland
- Lakewood
- Lynnwood
- Marysville
- Mount Vernon
- Oak Harbor
- Puyallup
- Redmond
- Renton
- Woodinville

Military bases:

- Joint Base Lewis–McChord
- Camp Murray
- Naval Station Everett
- Naval Base Kitsap
  - Bangor Annex
  - Bremerton Annex
- Puget Sound Naval Shipyard
- Naval Air Station Whidbey Island

== See also ==
- Puget Sound
- Puget Sound AVA (American Viticultural Area)
- Seattle metropolitan area
- Peter Puget
