= Stretch Island =

Island in Mason County, Washington, United States

Coordinates: 47°19′26″N 122°49′33″W

Stretch Island is an island in Case Inlet in the southern part of Puget Sound in the U.S. state of Washington. It forms part of the unincorporated Mason County community of Allyn-Grapeview. The island has a land area of 1.2179 km^{2} (300.95 acres) and a population of 162 as of the 2010 census. On the island's north side, it has buoys for overnight mooring, and Stretch Point State Park, a small state park only accessible by boat.

Stretch Island was named by the Wilkes Expedition in 1841 for crew member Samuel Stretch. From the 1870s to the 1920s, transportation needs for Stretch Island and other communities along Case Inlet were once served by a small flotilla of steamboats. The local community based monthly newspaper called the North Bay Review, services Allyn.
