= Taylor Shellfish Company =

American seafood company

- Industry: Seafood
- Founded: 1969
- Headquarters: Shelton, Washington, United States
- Products: Oysters, clams, mussels, geoduck
- Number of employees: 480 (2010)
- Website: taylorshellfishfarms.com

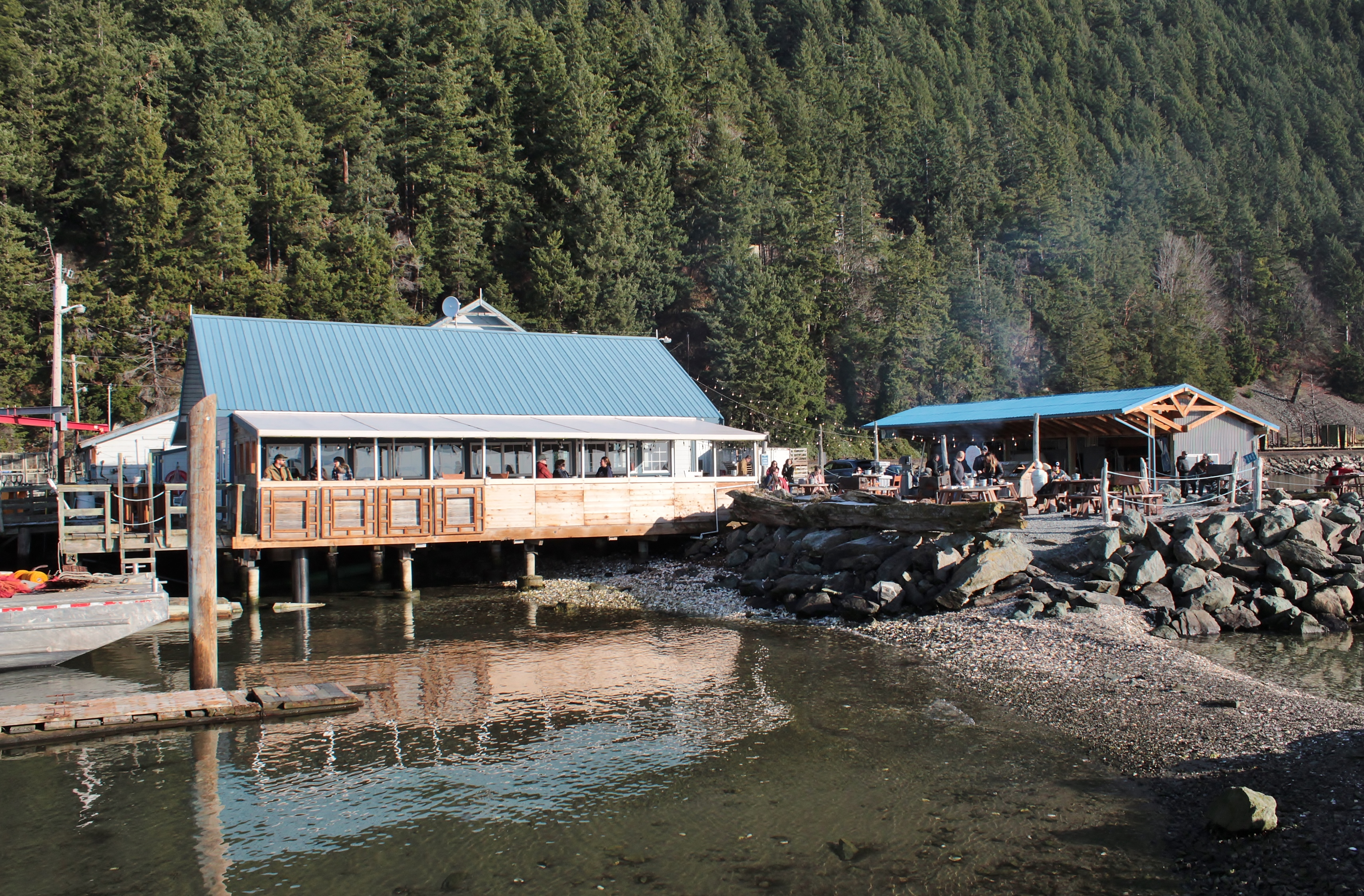
A Taylor Shellfish Farms store in Bow, Washington

Taylor Shellfish Company is an American seafood company based in Shelton, Washington. It is the country's largest producer of aquaculture (farmed) shellfish and has locations across Western Washington. The Taylor family started raising Olympia oysters in the 1920s. In the current form, the company, privately held, was started in 1969 as Taylor United by brothers Edwin and Justin Taylor, grandsons of James Y. Waldrip, an early Washingtonian who came to Seattle to work rebuilding after the Great Seattle Fire of 1889 before moving south and founding the Olympia Oyster Company in the 1890s. Waldrip's company farmed the Olympia oyster found only in South Puget Sound. Justin Taylor, born 1921, the oldest oyster farmer on Puget Sound in the early 2000s, died in 2011.

Taylor Shellfish harvests more than 2,000,000 pounds (910,000 kg) of clams annually as of the 2010s; 30% of the company's sales were in-shell oysters as of 2005. As of the late 1990s the company was one of the top ten employers in Mason County, Washington, and farmed oyster beds at their Oakland Bay headquarters and elsewhere around Hood Canal and Puget Sound including Totten Inlet (Oyster Bay), Eld Inlet, Samish Bay, Willapa Bay, and Whidbey Island. By 2010, the company had 480 employees and annual revenue over $50 million.

The company has operated oyster bars under the Taylor Shellfish Farms brand since 2014. Three are in Seattle including Capitol Hill and Pioneer Square, one in Downtown Bellevue beginning late 2017; and there are farm stores on Chuckanut Drive in Skagit County, and in Shelton.
