= McMicken Island State Park =

State park in the U.S. state of Washington

McMicken Island Marine State Park
- Location within Washington (state) Location within the United States
- Location: Mason County, Washington, United States
- Coordinates: 47°14′53″N 122°51′44″W
- Area: 11 acres (4.5 ha) (island); 222 acres (90 ha) (including tidelands)
- Elevation: 13 ft (4.0 m)
- Established: 1974
- Administrator: Washington State Parks and Recreation Commission
- Website: Official website

McMicken Island Marine State Park is a public recreation area in Case Inlet on the east flank of Harstine Island, South Puget Sound, Mason County, Washington. The state park's 222 acres (90 ha) include 11.5 acres (4.7 ha) of forested McMicken Island and 1,661 feet (506 m) of saltwater shoreline with a sheltered cove. A tombolo (sand bar) connects McMicken Island to Harstine Island at low tide. Park activities include hiking, boating, and harvesting shellfish. The park is administered as a satellite of Jarrell Cove State Park. It bears the name of William C. McMicken, who was Washington Surveyor General from 1873 to 1886.
