= Jarrell Cove State Park =

State park in the U.S. state of Washington

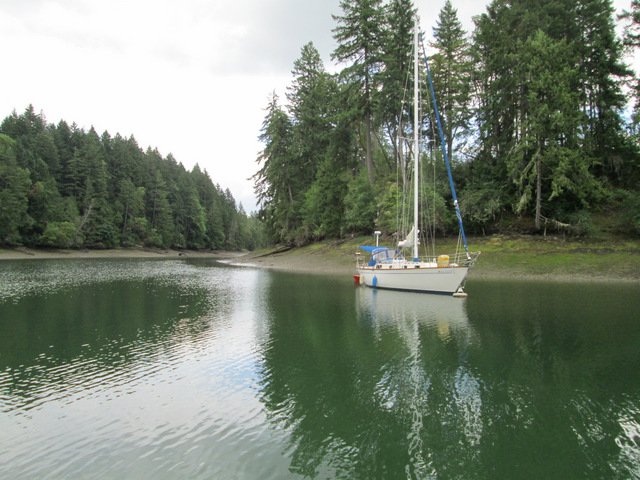
- Waters of the cove on the shores of Puget Sound

- Location within Washington (state) Location within the United States
- Location: Mason County, Washington, United States
- Coordinates: 47°16′59″N 122°53′15″W
- Area: 67 acres (27 ha)
- Established: 1953
- Administrator: Washington State Parks and Recreation Commission
- Visitors: 55,304 (in 2024)
- Website: Official website

Jarrell Cove State Park is a Washington state park on Harstine Island in south Puget Sound. It consists of 67 acres (27 ha) of forest with 3,500 feet (1,100 m) of saltwater shoreline. Park activities include camping, hiking, biking, boating, scuba diving, fishing, swimming, waterskiing, clamming, crabbing, field sports, beachcombing, windsurfing, birdwatching, wildlife viewing, and horseshoes.

Jarrell Cove State Park administers five satellite state parks: Eagle Island, Harstine Island (a day-use park 2 miles (3.2 km) from Jarrell Cove with beach access via a 0.5-mile (0.80 km) trail), Hope Island, McMicken Island, and Stretch Point.

The park was established in 1953 and gradually expanded in the 1960s. It was initially known as Gerald Cove State Park, but the spelling was corrected in 1966 upon the request of the Hartstene Island Grange.
