= Allyn-Grapeview, Washington =

- Former CDP
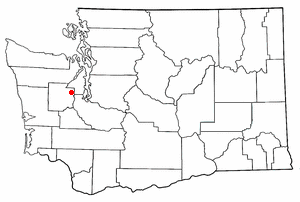
- Location of Allyn-Grapeview, Washington
- Coordinates: 47°21′54″N 122°50′9″W
- Country: United States
- State: Washington
- County: Mason

Area
  - Total: 13.8 sq mi (35.8 km^{2})
  - Land: 8.5 sq mi (21.9 km^{2})
  - Water: 5.3 sq mi (13.8 km^{2})

Population (2010)
  - Total: 2,917
  - Density: 236/sq mi (91.3/km^{2})
- Time zone: UTC-8 (Pacific (PST))
  - Summer (DST): UTC-7 (PDT)
- FIPS code: 53-01447

Allyn-Grapeview is a former census-designated place (CDP) in Mason County, Washington, United States. At the 2010 census, the CDP was separated into Allyn and Grapeview. The combined 2010 population of the two new CDPs was 2,917. The community-based monthly newspaper called the North Bay Review, services the Allyn-Grapeview area. Allyn's main road and thoroughfare is State Route 3 with Grapeview connected to Route 3 via Grapeview Loop Road.

== Geography ==
Allyn-Grapeview is located on the western shore of North Bay region of Puget Sound's Case Inlet.

According to the United States Census Bureau, the CDP has a total area of 13.8 square miles (35.7 km^{2}), of which, 8.5 square miles (21.9 km^{2}) of it is land and 5.3 square miles (13.8 km^{2}) of it (38.62%) is water.

=== Climate ===
This region experiences warm (but not hot) and dry summers, with no average monthly temperatures above 71.6 °F. According to the Köppen Climate Classification system, Allyn-Grapeview has a warm-summer Mediterranean climate, abbreviated "Csb" on climate maps.

Climate data for Grapeview
Month	Jan	Feb	Mar	Apr	May	Jun	Jul	Aug	Sep	Oct	Nov	Dec	Year
Record high °F (°C)	62 (17)	70 (21)	79 (26)	87 (31)	94 (34)	102 (39)	102 (39)	99 (37)	95 (35)	82 (28)	77 (25)	61 (16)	102 (39)
Mean daily maximum °F (°C)	44.4 (6.9)	48.3 (9.1)	53.7 (12.1)	60 (16)	66.9 (19.4)	71.8 (22.1)	77.1 (25.1)	77 (25)	70.8 (21.6)	60.2 (15.7)	50.6 (10.3)	45.7 (7.6)	60.5 (15.8)
Mean daily minimum °F (°C)	34.3 (1.3)	35.5 (1.9)	36.6 (2.6)	39.8 (4.3)	44.5 (6.9)	49.2 (9.6)	52 (11)	52.6 (11.4)	49.1 (9.5)	44.3 (6.8)	39.4 (4.1)	36 (2)	42.8 (6.0)
Record low °F (°C)	8 (−13)	8 (−13)	5 (−15)	23 (−5)	30 (−1)	30 (−1)	38 (3)	40 (4)	31 (−1)	24 (−4)	14 (−10)	9 (−13)	5 (−15)
Average precipitation inches (mm)	8.22 (209)	6.43 (163)	5.22 (133)	3.31 (84)	2.09 (53)	1.5 (38)	0.78 (20)	1.06 (27)	2.08 (53)	4.64 (118)	8.1 (210)	8.75 (222)	52.19 (1,326)
Average snowfall inches (cm)	2.2 (5.6)	0.9 (2.3)	0.2 (0.51)	0 (0)	0 (0)	0 (0)	0 (0)	0 (0)	0 (0)	0 (0)	0.6 (1.5)	1 (2.5)	4.9 (12)
Average precipitation days	18	16	16	13	10	8	4	5	7	12	18	19	146

== Demographics ==
Historical population
Census	Pop.	Note	%±
1990	1,526		—
2000	2,004		31.3%
2010	2,917		45.6%
U.S. Decennial Census

As of the census of 2000, there were 2,004 people, 861 households, and 642 families residing in the CDP. The population density was 236.6 people per square mile (91.4/km^{2}). There were 1,212 housing units at an average density of 143.1/sq mi (55.2/km^{2}). The racial makeup of the CDP was 93.46% White, 0.40% African American, 0.85% Native American, 0.25% Asian, 0.55% Pacific Islander, 1.05% from other races, and 3.44% from two or more races. Hispanic or Latino of any race were 1.70% of the population.

There were 861 households, out of which 20.6% had children under the age of 18 living with them, 67.9% were married couples living together, 3.6% had a female householder with no husband present, and 25.4% were non-families. 19.7% of all households were made up of individuals, and 10.2% had someone living alone who was 65 years of age or older. The average household size was 2.33 and the average family size was 2.65.

In the CDP, the population was spread out, with 18.0% under the age of 18, 4.6% from 18 to 24, 17.9% from 25 to 44, 33.0% from 45 to 64, and 26.5% who were 65 years of age or older. The median age was 51 years. For every 100 females, there were 107.5 males. For every 100 females age 18 and over, there were 102.0 males.

The median income for a household in the CDP was $46,224, and the median income for a family was $51,563. Males had a median income of $45,781 versus $29,231 for females. The per capita income for the CDP was $22,305. About 4.6% of families and 6.5% of the population were below the poverty line, including 7.1% of those under age 18 and 1.3% of those age 65 or over.

== History ==
From the 1870s to the 1920s, transportation needs for Grapeview (once known as Detroit) and other communities along Case Inlet were once served by a small flotilla of steamboats. The local community based monthly newspaper called the North Bay Review, services Allyn.
