= Summer camp (disambiguation) =

A summer camp is a supervised program for children or teenagers conducted during the summer months.

Summer camp may also refer to:

- Summer Camp Music Festival, a music festival
- Summercamp, an American band
- Summer Camp (band), a British indie pop duo
- Summer Camp (1979 film), a film by Chuck Vincent
- Summer Camp (2015 film), a film by Alberto Marini
- Summer Camp (2024 film), a film by Castille Landon
- Summer Camp (TV series), a reality show that aired on USA Network

== See also ==
- Summer Camping, a Canadian television series
- Camp (disambiguation)
