= Herbert Arntson =

American writer

Herbert Edward Arntson (April 8, 1911 – November 27, 1982) was a writer of juvenile historical fiction from Tacoma, Washington.

Arntson attended the University of Puget Sound for his undergraduate and master's degrees, both as an English major. For his doctoral studies he went to the University of Washington. He was married to Dorothy Arntson.

He was an English teacher for high school and college students. He headed the creative writing program at Washington State University for 28 years. His collected papers are held at the University of Oregon library archives.

His historical fiction stories center in and around Oregon's Willamette Valley during the mid-19th century. He died in Grapeview, Washington in 1982.

== Writings ==
- Adam Gray: Stowaway; A story of the China Trade
- Alp, the Adrian Renegade
- An Accident on the Way to the Cemetery
- An Approach to Point of View
- Any Month is April, at the Right Time
- The Bad Law That Helped to Win Us a State
- Bigbone Woman
- Caravan to Oregon
- Christmas Comes to the Duke
- The Cleanup of Dryhole Coulee
- The Coroner's Proxy
- Eighteen Forty-Eight
- The Fall and Rise of Mr. Jones
- The Flying Bigelows and Others
- The Flying Buttress
- Heron Island
- Home Sweet Houseboat
- Jethro of Old Oregon
- Lisa and the Four Ladies
- The Man in the Upper Righthand Corner
- Mountain Boy in Oregon
- Otto, The Dog That Plays Piano
- Potter's Evil
- The Professor Married a Hep Cat
- A Study of the Early Reading of Coleridge (thesis)
- Triumph of the Guarantee
- The Walrus and the Paragraph
- Your Child's English
