= Hope Island State Park (Mason County, Washington) =

State park in Washington (state), United States

Hope Island Marine State Park - Mason County
- Location within Washington (state) Location within the United States
- Location: Mason County, Washington, United States
- Coordinates: 47°11′14″N 122°55′44″W
- Area: 25.36 acres (10.26 ha)
- Elevation: 75 ft (23 m)
- Established: 1990
- Administrator: Washington State Parks and Recreation Commission
- Website: Official website

Hope Island Marine State Park - Mason County is a Washington state park in Mason County that is accessible only by boat. It is located due east of Steamboat Island near the Totten Inlet.

The park consists of 106 acres (43 ha) of old-growth forest and salt marsh with a 1.5-mile (2.4 km) beach on Puget Sound. Park activities include picnicking, camping, hiking, fishing, clamming, beachcombing, and birdwatching. Water is not available on the island, and open fires and pets are not permitted. The park has been administered as a satellite of Jarrell Cove State Park, since its acquisition from private owners in 1990.
