= Pickering Passage =

Strait in Puget Sound, Washington

Coordinates: 47.25°N 122.925°W

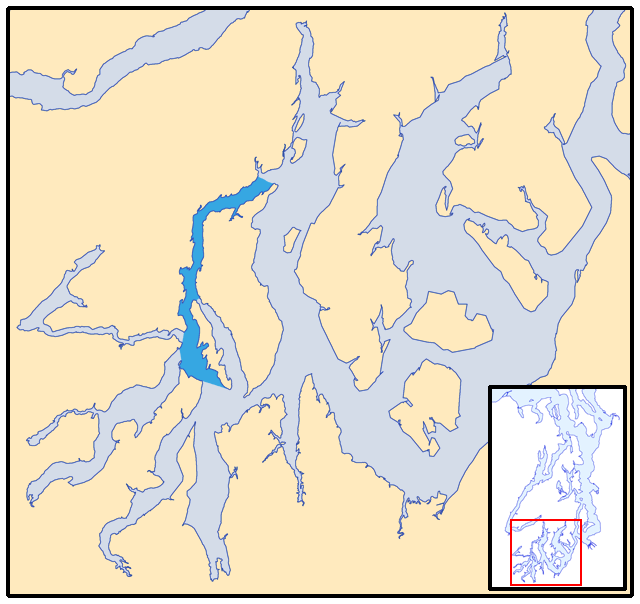

Pickering Passage is a strait, in the southern end of part of Puget Sound in the U.S. state of Washington. Entirely within Mason County, the Pickering Passage separates Hartstine Island from the mainland, and connects Totten Inlet with the north end of Case Inlet.

Pickering Passage flows past the mouths of Hammersley Inlet, Totten Inlet, and Eld Inlet. It is a nutrient rich area, producing oysters that grow very quickly.

== History ==
Pickering Passage was named by Charles Wilkes during the Wilkes Expedition of 1838–1842, to honor Charles Pickering (naturalist), one of the expedition's naturalists.

From 1922 to 1969, a ferry owned and operated by Mason County, Washington crossed Pickering Passage to link Harstine Island to the mainland. The ferry was replaced by a bridge in 1969
