= Vaughn, Washington =

Unincorporated community in Washington, United States

- Unincorporated community and CDP
- Location within Washington (state)
- Coordinates: 47°20′15″N 122°46′54″W
- Country: United States
- State: Washington
- County: Pierce

Area
  - Total: 2.3 sq mi (6.0 km^{2})
  - Land: 1.42 sq mi (3.7 km^{2})
  - Water: 0.88 sq mi (2.3 km^{2})
- Elevation: 203 ft (62 m)
- Time zone: UTC-8 (Pacific (PST))
  - Summer (DST): UTC-7 (PDT)
- ZIP code: 98394
- Area code: 253
- GNIS feature ID: 2585049

Vaughn is a census-designated place and unincorporated community in Pierce County, Washington, United States. As of the 2020 census, Vaughn had a population of 565. Vaughn is located on Vaughn Bay in the northwestern Key Peninsula. Vaughn has a post office with ZIP code 98394.

Vaughn was named for W.D. Vaughn, who settled in the area around 1851.

Vaughn was once an important port for the Key Peninsula. From the 1870s to the 1920s, transportation needs for Vaughn and other communities along Case Inlet were once served by a small flotilla of steamboats. The local community based monthly newspaper called the North Bay Review, services Allyn.

== Climate ==
This region experiences warm and dry summers, with no average monthly temperatures above 71.6 °F. According to the Köppen Climate Classification system, Vaughn has a warm-summer Mediterranean climate, abbreviated "Csb" on climate maps.

== Demographics ==
Historical population
Census	Pop.	Note	%±
2010	544		—
2020	565		3.9%
U.S. Decennial Census; 2000 2010

Vaughn first appeared as a census designated place in the 2010 U.S. census.

=== Racial and ethnic composition ===
Vaughn CDP, Washington – Racial and ethnic composition Note: the US Census treats Hispanic/Latino as an ethnic category. This table excludes Latinos from the racial categories and assigns them to a separate category. Hispanics/Latinos may be of any race.
Race / Ethnicity (NH = Non-Hispanic)	Pop 2010	Pop 2020	% 2010	% 2020
White alone (NH)	497	459	91.36%	81.24%
Black or African American alone (NH)	3	4	0.55%	0.71%
Native American or Alaska Native alone (NH)	0	2	0.00%	0.35%
Asian alone (NH)	6	8	1.10%	1.42%
Native Hawaiian or Pacific Islander alone (NH)	0	3	0.00%	0.53%
Other race alone (NH)	2	2	0.37%	0.35%
Mixed race or Multiracial (NH)	15	41	2.76%	7.26%
Hispanic or Latino (any race)	21	46	3.86%	8.14%
Total	544	565	100.00%	100.00%
