= Bayshore, Washington =

Unincorporated community in Washington (state)

- Unincorporated community
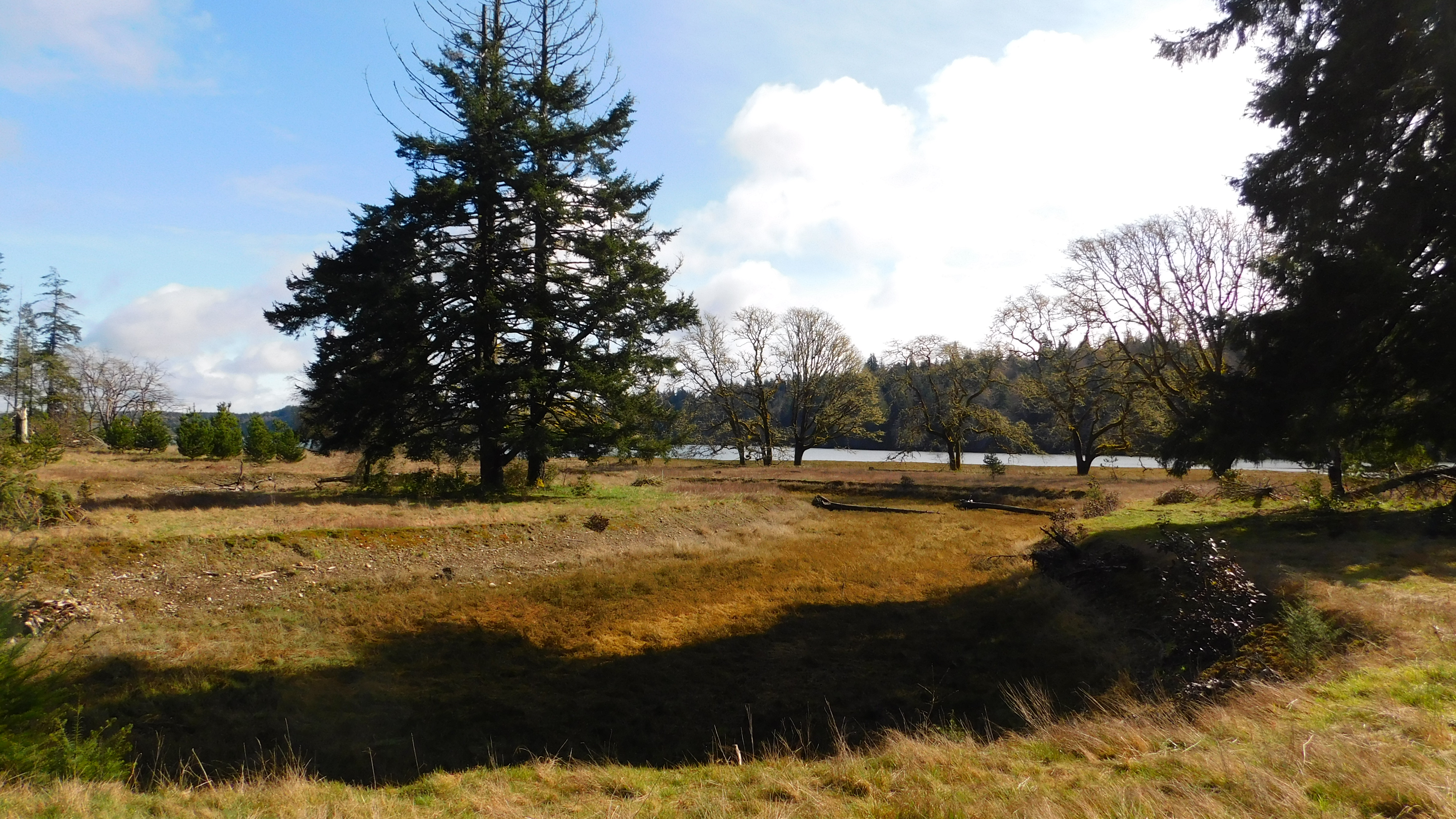
- Bayshore Preserve, 2025

- Location within Washington (state) Location within the United States
- Country: United States
- State: Washington
- County: Mason
- Elevation: 23 ft (7 m)
- Time zone: UTC-8 (Pacific (PST))
  - Summer (DST): UTC-7 (PDT)
- GNIS feature ID: 1516205

Bayshore (Note: The name of the community is listed as "Bay Shore" under the Geographic Names Information System but is commonly spelled as Bayshore.) is an unincorporated community located on Oakland Bay in southern Puget Sound, northeast of Shelton, Washington.
