= Harstine Island ferry =

Defunct ferry route in Washington state

Harstine Island Ferry
- Harstine Island ferry, October 1947
- Locale: 47.2476°N 122.9202°W
- Waterway: Pickering Passage
- Authority: Mason County, Washington
- Began operation: 1922
- Ended operation: 1969
- No. of vessels: Island Belle, Harstine I, Harstine II.

The Harstine Island ferry connected Harstine Island with mainland Mason County, Washington across Pickering Passage in south Puget Sound until 1969 when the ferry was replaced by a bridge.

== Course of service ==
In 1922 Mason County provided a ferry service to Harstine Island with the ferry Island Belle, which was a scow equipped with a 10 horsepower (7.5 kW) motor, driven by sidewheels, and which and a lifting ramp on each end. Island Belle could transport three automobiles, and made three trips a day, three days a week. The ferry crossed Pickering Passage from the mainland to a landing on the west side of Harstine Island.

In 1929, Mason County replaced Island Belle with Harstine I, and, in 1945, Harstine II replaced Harstine I. In 1969 the ferry was superseded by a bridge.
