= Peale Passage =

Coordinates: 47°11′42.3″N 122°53′38.4″W

Peale Passage is a strait, in the southern of part of Puget Sound in the U.S. state of Washington. Entirely within Mason County, Washington, Peale Passage separates Hartstine Island from Squaxin Island.

Peale Passage was named by Charles Wilkes during the Wilkes Expedition of 1838–1842, to honor Titian Peale, one of the expedition's naturalists.
