= Steamboat Island =

Island and community in Washington state

Steamboat Island, Washington
- Interactive map of Steamboat Island, Washington
- Coordinates: 47°11′06″N 122°56′24″W
- Country: United States
- State: Washington
- County: Thurston
- Established: 1909

Area
  - Land: .01 sq mi (0.026 km^{2})

Population (2010)
  - Total: 41
- Time zone: UTC-8 (WST)
- ZIP code: 98502

Steamboat Island is an island in southern Puget Sound. Located at the opening of the Totten Inlet, the area lies at the northern end of a peninsula known locally as the "Steamboat Peninsula".

== History ==
Founded in 1909, Steamboat Island was named by local settlers who thought the island resembled a steamboat. The peninsula and island are contained within the Griffin School District and is served by the Griffin Fire Department #13 and is also known locally as the "Griffin area" of Thurston County, Washington.

== Demographics ==
The population is mostly Caucasian and largely made of two person households.

== Parks and recreation ==
The island is about 400 ft (120 m) due west from Hope Island Marine State Park, which is accessible only by boat.

== See also ==
- List of geographic features in Thurston County, Washington
