= Tyconda =

Nineteenth century American commercial ship

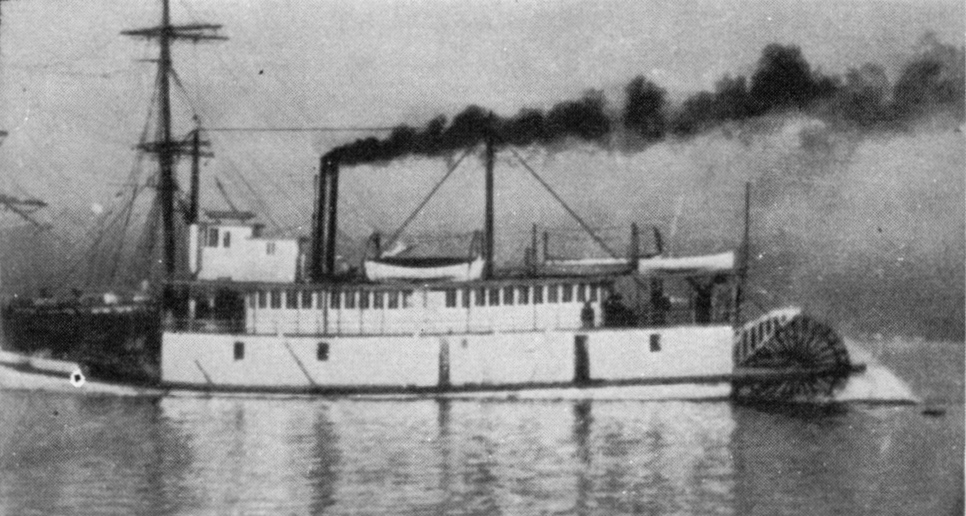
- Tyconda

History
- Name: Tyconda
- Route: Puget Sound, Stikine River
- Completed: 1898
- Out of service: 1915
- Identification: U.S. registry #145889
- Fate: Destroyed by fire 1915

General characteristics
- Tonnage: 186 gross, 117 registered
- Length: 104.3 ft (31.8 m)
- Beam: 21.9 ft (6.7 m)
- Depth: 8 ft (2.4 m)
- Installed power: twin steam engines, horizontally mounted, 130 indicated horsepower
- Propulsion: sternwheel

Tyconda was a sternwheel steamboat of the Puget Sound Mosquito Fleet, later transferred to the Stikine River.

== Career ==
Tyconda was built in 1898 for the Lorentz Brothers, a steamboat family active in Puget Sound maritime affairs. Tyconda was the only sternwheeler the Lorentz Brothers ever owned. The vessel had a shallow draft and could pull close to beaches for embarking and disembarking passengers and loading and unloading freight. In 1914, the vessel was sold to be transferred to the Stikine River in southeastern Alaska. After several runs up the Stikine, the vessel was assessed as being underpowered for that river. It was transferred to the Anchorage, Alaska, area to be operated on the Susitna River. On October 8, 1915, the vessel was destroyed by fire at Anchorage.
