= Ballow, Washington =

- Unincorporated community
- Location within Washington (state) Location within the United States
- Coordinates: 47°14′25.34″N 122°52′1.50″W
- Country: United States
- State: Washington
- County: Mason
- Time zone: UTC-8 (Pacific (PST))
  - Summer (DST): UTC-7 (PDT)

Ballow is an unincorporated community in Mason County, Washington, United States. A post office operated there from 1894 to 1926.
