= Stretch Point State Park =

Park in the U.S. state of Washington

Coordinates: 47°19′42″N 122°49′16″W

Stretch Point State Park was a state park established in 1967 and occupying 8.2 acres (3.3 ha) of land on the northern tip of Stretch Island in Mason County, Washington. As of 2025, it was longer listed on the website of the Washington State Parks and Recreation Commission. According to the Washington State Parks Foundation, Stretch Point is "a small day-use park" with a picnic table that "offers a ... rest stop and ‘stretch’ for boaters navigating ... Case Inlet." It is only accessible by boat.
