= Grapeview, Washington =

- CDP
- Interactive map of Grapeview, Washington
- Coordinates: 47°19′48″N 122°49′54″W
- Country: United States
- State: Washington
- County: Mason
- Elevation: 0 ft (0 m)

Population (2020)
  - Total: 991
- Time zone: UTC-8 (Pacific (PST))
  - Summer (DST): UTC-7 (PDT)
- ZIP Code: 98546
- Area code(s): 360, 564
- GNIS feature ID: 2586733

Grapeview is a census-designated place (CDP) in Mason County, Washington, United States. The population was 991 at the 2020 census. It was part of the former Allyn-Grapeview CDP that was broken up into Allyn and Grapeview in 2010. Grapeview is connected to State Route 3 via Grapeview Loop Road.

Grapeview is home to a small Puget Sound Maritime Museum, and the Fair Harbor.

== History ==
From the 1870s to the 1920s, transportation needs for Grapeview (once known as Detroit) and other communities along Case Inlet were once served by a small flotilla of steamboats.

== Demographics ==
Historical population
Census	Pop.	Note	%±
2010	954		—
2020	991		3.9%
U.S. Decennial Census; 2000 2010

Grapeview first appeared as a census designated place in the 2010 U.S. census formed from part of deleted Allyn-Grapeview CDP.

=== Racial and ethnic composition ===
Grapeview CDP, Washington – Racial and ethnic composition Note: the US Census treats Hispanic/Latino as an ethnic category. This table excludes Latinos from the racial categories and assigns them to a separate category. Hispanics/Latinos may be of any race.
Race / Ethnicity (NH = Non-Hispanic)	Pop 2010	Pop 2020	% 2010	% 2020
White alone (NH)	886	849	92.87%	85.67%
Black or African American alone (NH)	2	3	0.21%	0.30%
Native American or Alaska Native alone (NH)	1	8	0.10%	0.81%
Asian alone (NH)	12	12	1.26%	1.21%
Native Hawaiian or Pacific Islander alone (NH)	2	2	0.21%	0.20%
Other race alone (NH)	0	2	0.00%	0.20%
Mixed race or Multiracial (NH)	30	73	3.14%	7.37%
Hispanic or Latino (any race)	21	42	2.20%	4.24%
Total	954	991	100.00%	100.00%
