= Little Skookum Inlet =

Coordinates: 47°08′26″N 123°04′03″W

Little Skookum Inlet is a branch of southern Puget Sound which extends westward from Totten Inlet. The community of Kamilche, Washington is on Little Skookum Inlet. It is also the estuary and headwaters for the Little Skookum, Elson, Lynch and Mable Taylor Creeks. The Little Skookum and Totten Inlets flow southwest and form the Kamilche Peninsula, a headland jetting out from Kamilche, Washington.
