= Nisqually Reach =

Bay in Puget Sound, Washington state

Coordinates: 47°08′23″N 122°44′30″W

The Nisqually Reach is a portion of Puget Sound south of the Tacoma Narrows, near the Nisqually River delta. It is classified as a bay by the United States government. It was originally defined as "the portion of the Sound lying between Anderson Island and the mainland".

The Thurston–Pierce County line bisects the Reach.

== Protected areas ==
On the shores of the Reach are Tolmie State Park and Nisqually National Wildlife Refuge on the Thurston County mainland. On Anderson Island in Pierce County are several marine county parks. Washington State Department of Natural Resources operates the Nisqually Reach Aquatic Reserve, which includes the state-owned aquatic lands on the mainland including Nisqually River delta, and the state-owned bedlands and beaches surrounding Anderson Island, Ketron Island and Eagle Island.

== See also ==
- List of geographic features in Thurston County, Washington
