= Hammersley Inlet =

Coordinates: 47°12′20″N 123°01′01″W

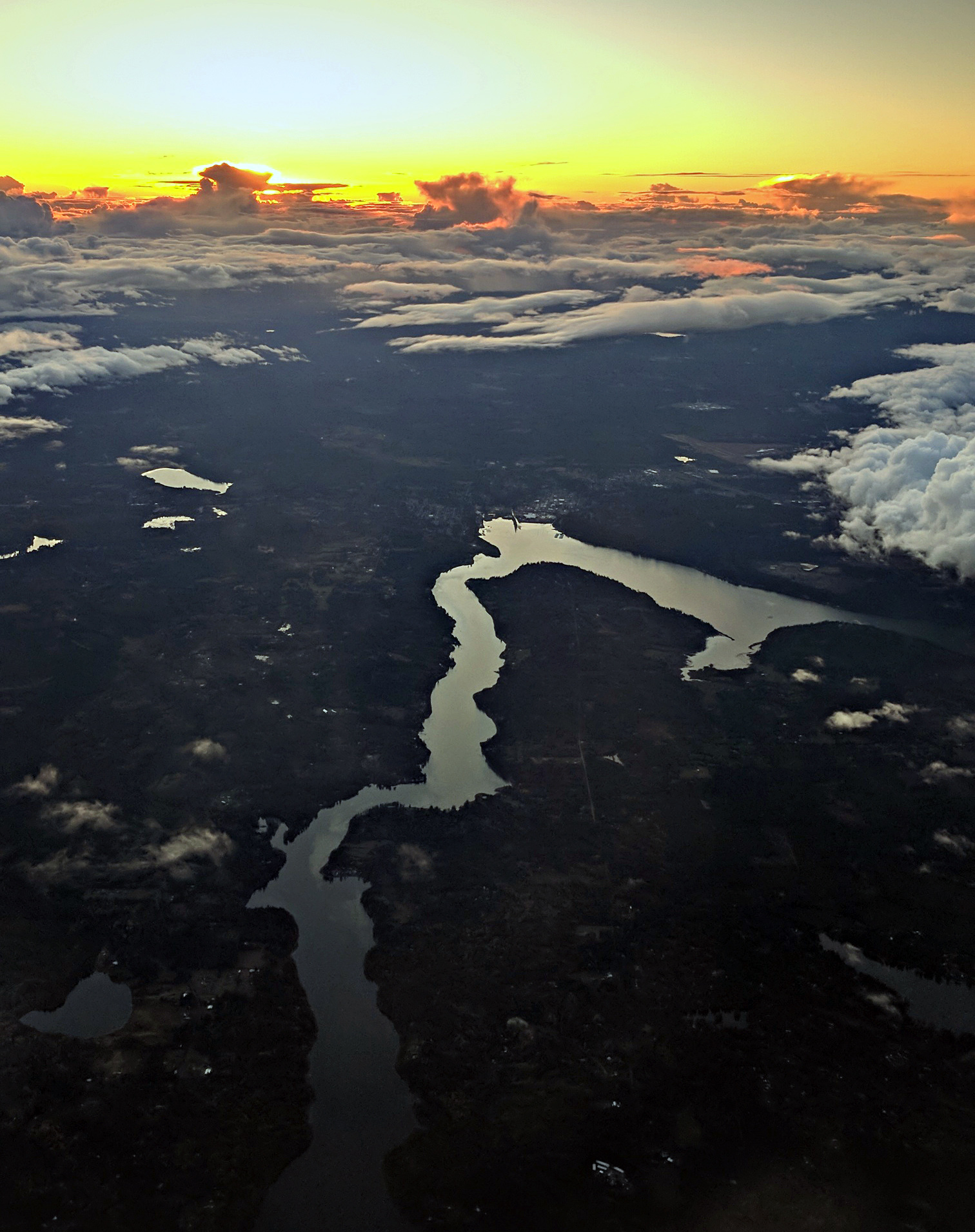
Hammersley Inlet (left and bottom) connects Puget Sound to Oakland Bay (right).

Hammersley Inlet, in southwestern Puget Sound in the U.S. state of Washington, is an arm of water opening north of Arcadia and leading to the city of Shelton and Oakland Bay. Hammersley Inlet is also known as Big Skookum.

== Description ==
Hammersley Inlet connects the Oakland Bay and Shelton to the greater Puget Sound. It is approximately 8 nautical miles (15 km) of winding, potentially rapidly flowing water. As tides change in the South Puget Sound, Hammersley Inlet is the only artery through which all water must flow between the Oakland Bay and the greater Puget Sound. As tides change, they force the water through narrow, winding, shallow, Hammersley, producing erratic currents up to 5 knots (9 km/h). Many mariners avoid Hammersley because of these conditions, but with the proper planning, a depth sounder, and care, Hammersley can be navigated without incident. The NOAA chart for the inlet is #18457, but most locals rely on the placemats from the Shelton Yacht Club.

There are few aids to navigation on Hammersley, as the many log booms towed through the inlet over the years have destroyed them. Mariners are advised to study their charts, create a route, and stick to it. Hammersley Inlet ends as it meets the Oakland Bay, in the city of Shelton. Hammersley Inlet is also known for its abundant shellfish production of clams and oysters.

Hammersley Inlet was named - and misspelled - by Charles Wilkes during the Wilkes Expedition of 1838–1842, to honor George W. Hammersly, one of the expedition's midshipmen. In the Nisqually language it was called Sa-ha-wamsh.

== See also ==
- Little Skookum Inlet
