= Allyn, Washington =

- CDP
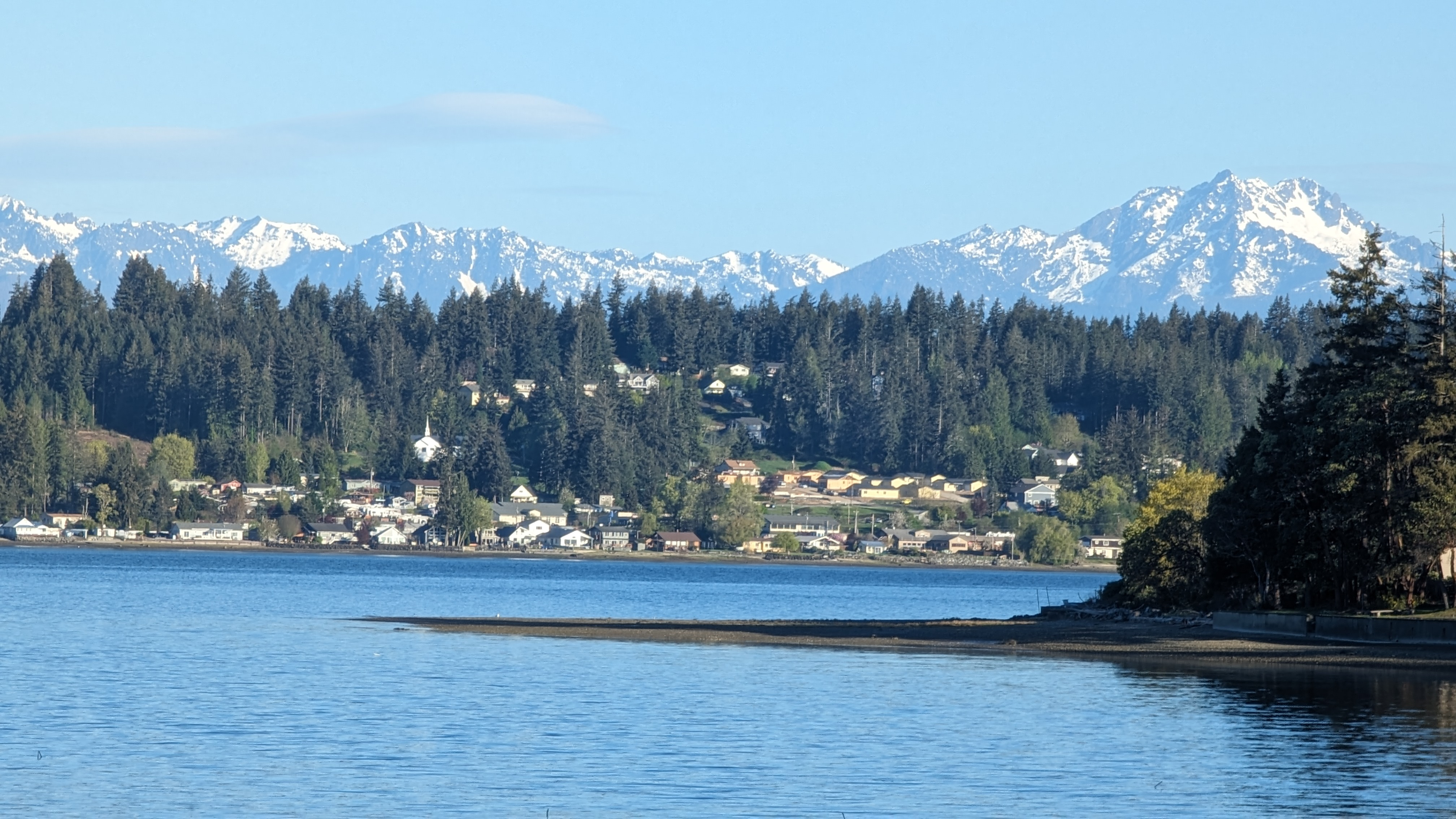
- Allyn from across North Bay

- Location within Washington (state) Location within the United States
- Coordinates: 47°22′48″N 122°50′24″W
- Country: United States
- State: Washington
- County: Mason
- Elevation: 217 ft (66 m)

Population (2020)
  - Total: 2,194
- Time zone: UTC-8 (Pacific (PST))
  - Summer (DST): UTC-7 (PDT)
- ZIP Code: 98524
- Area code(s): 360, 564
- GNIS feature ID: 2586727
- Website: www.allynwa.org

Allyn is a census-designated place (CDP) in Mason County, Washington, United States. The population was 2,194 as of the 2020 census. It was part of the former Allyn-Grapeview CDP that was broken up into Allyn and Grapeview in 2010. Allyn is located on the western shore of the North Bay region of the Case Inlet of Puget Sound. The area's main road and thoroughfare is State Route 3.

== History ==
The community was first settled in 1853. The town was platted and papers to form the town were filed on September 6, 1889, naming the town after Judge Frank Allyn of Tacoma who was influential in the early development of Allyn. By 1890 Allyn had a post office, school, newspaper, sawmill, two saloons, a hotel and wharf.

=== Lakeland Village ===
Lakeland Village, a multi-phase residential development started in the late 1960s with continued current development, includes over 800 homes and makes up a majority of Allyn's population. Lakeland Village is built around a 27-hole golf course and Lake Anderson, a 50-acre private lake providing recreational activities for residents.

== Transportation ==
From the 1870s to the 1920s, transportation needs for Allyn and other communities along Case Inlet were once served by a small flotilla of steamboats. The last steamboat run from Tacoma to Allyn occurred in 1924, but local service may have lasted longer.

== Newspaper ==
The local community based monthly newspaper, called the North Bay Review, services Allyn.

== Demographics ==
Historical population
| Census | Pop. | Note | %± |
|---|---|---|---|
| 2010 | 1,963 | | — |
| 2020 | 2,194 | | 11.8% |
U.S. Decennial Census; 2000 2010

Allyn first appeared as a census designated place in the 2010 U.S. census formed from part of deleted Allyn-Grapeview CDP.

=== Racial and ethnic composition ===
Allyn CDP, Washington – Racial and ethnic composition Note: the US Census treats Hispanic/Latino as an ethnic category. This table excludes Latinos from the racial categories and assigns them to a separate category. Hispanics/Latinos may be of any race.
| Race / Ethnicity (NH = Non-Hispanic) | Pop 2010 | Pop 2020 | % 2010 | % 2020 |
|---|---|---|---|---|
| White alone (NH) | 1,814 | 1,898 | 92.41% | 86.51% |
| Black or African American alone (NH) | 12 | 15 | 0.61% | 0.68% |
| Native American or Alaska Native alone (NH) | 8 | 9 | 0.41% | 0.41% |
| Asian alone (NH) | 27 | 33 | 1.38% | 1.50% |
| Native Hawaiian or Pacific Islander alone (NH) | 2 | 6 | 0.10% | 0.27% |
| Other race alone (NH) | 0 | 12 | 0.00% | 0.55% |
| Mixed race or Multiracial (NH) | 55 | 106 | 2.80% | 4.83% |
| Hispanic or Latino (any race) | 45 | 115 | 2.29% | 5.24% |
| Total | 1,963 | 2,194 | 100.00% | 100.00% |
