= Eagle Island State Park (Washington) =

Public recreation area in Pierce County, Washington

Eagle Island Marine State Park
- Location within Washington (state) Location within the United States
- Location: Pierce County, Washington, United States
- Coordinates: 47°11′15″N 122°41′46″W
- Area: 5 acres (2.0 ha)
- Elevation: 30 ft (9.1 m)
- Administrator: Washington State Parks and Recreation Commission
- Website: Official website

Eagle Island Marine State Park is a public recreation area in south Puget Sound occupying the entirety of Eagle Island in Pierce County, Washington. The five-acre (2.0 ha) island sits in Balch Passage between McNeil and Anderson islands about 750 feet (230 m) off Anderson Island's north shore. The island was named for Harry Eagle, one of the party members of the Wilkes Expedition of 1841.

Park activities include picnicking, beachcombing, birdwatching, and wildlife viewing. A primitive trail runs through thick brush with short spurs that lead to the beach. The narrow beach is mostly gravel with the exception of a point of sand on the south end of the island. Two moorage buoys are available for boaters. The park is administered as a satellite of Jarrell Cove State Park.
