= Oyster Bay (Puget Sound) =

Bay in Puget Sound, Washington state

Coordinates: 47°06′20″N 123°04′31″W

Oyster Bay is an inlet in southern Puget Sound which branches off from Totten Inlet. The bay spans Mason and Thurston counties, in the U.S. state of Washington. Kennedy Creek empties into the bay at the U.S. Highway 101 overpass.

Oyster Bay was named for the oyster industry it supports. The bay is the site of one of only four oyster reserves in Puget Sound where the Olympia oyster grows. Oyster Bay is one of the most productive chum salmon runs in the state with over 40,000 spawners a year, estimated to be two-thirds of the run that would exist without human impacts.

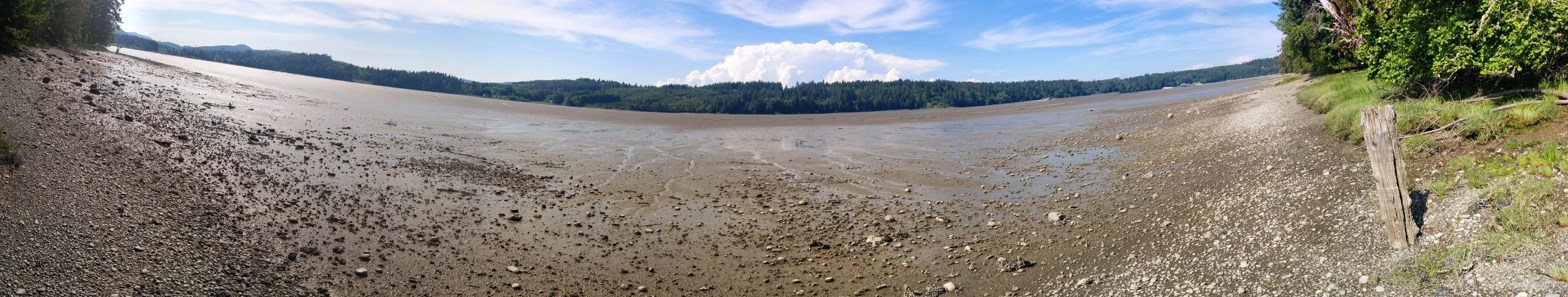
Oyster Bay at low tide, looking northwest from the Thurston County side. A commercial oyster bed can be seen in the bay right of center, and an oyster processing facility behind it in Mason County. Kennedy Creek Natural Area Preserve is on the far shoreline at the left edge. The thundercloud is in the vicinity of the Olympic Mountains, out of sight here.

== See also ==
- List of geographic features in Thurston County, Washington
