= Totten Inlet =

Inlet in Puget Sound, Washington state

Coordinates: 47°9′20″N 122°59′26″W

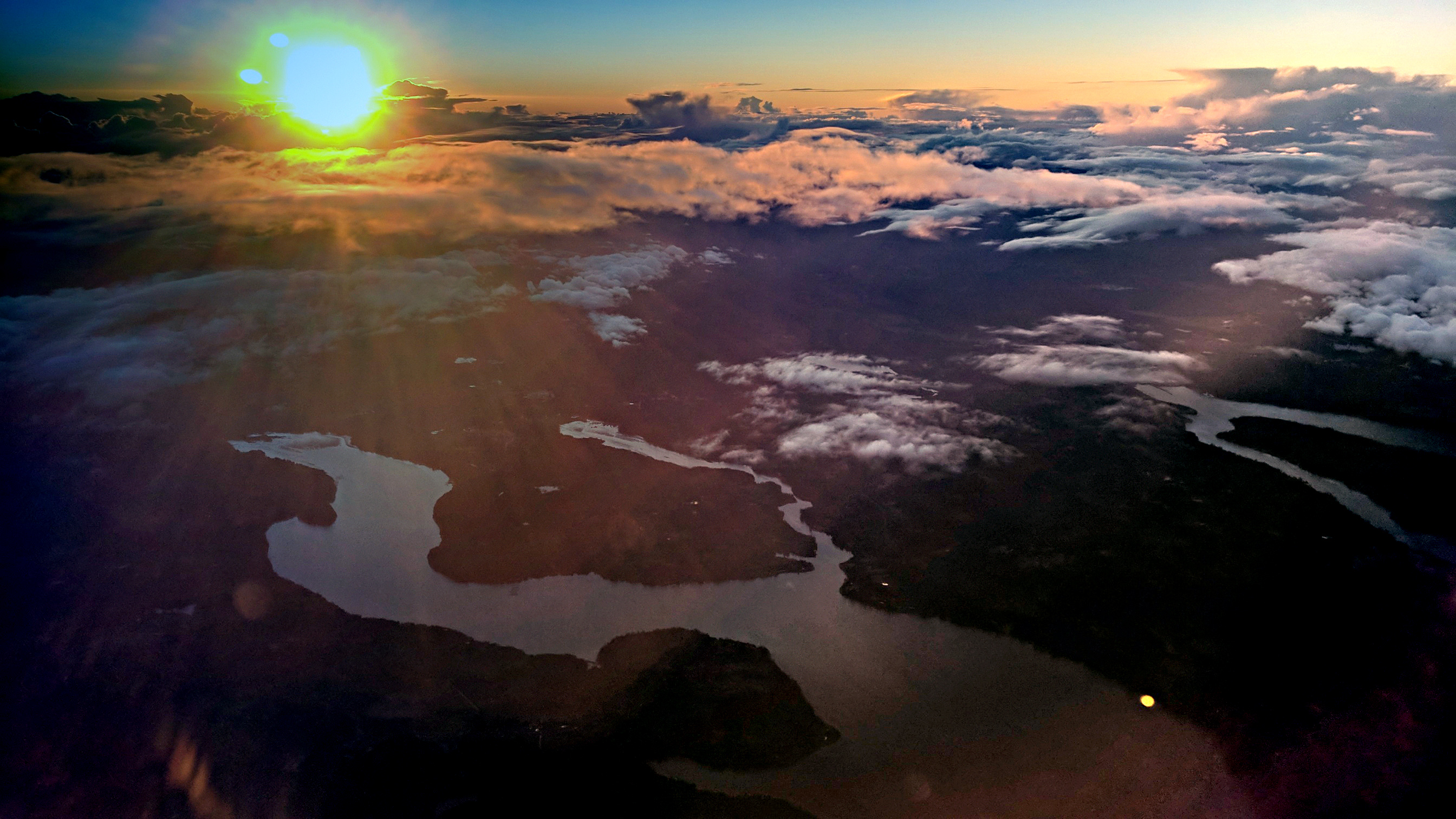
- Aerial view of south Puget Sound; Totten Inlet (bottom) branches into Oyster Bay (left)
- Interactive map of Totten Inlet
- Location: Mason County and Thurston County, Washington
- Type: Inlet
- Etymology: George M. Totten
- Part of: South Puget Sound
- Ocean/sea sources: Salish Sea
- Sections/sub-basins: Oyster Bay, Little Skookum Inlet
- Settlements: Olympia, Washington, Steamboat Island
- References: GNIS feature ID - 1527320

Totten Inlet lies in the southern end of Puget Sound in the U.S. state of Washington.

== History ==
Totten Inlet was named by Charles Wilkes during the Wilkes Expedition of 1838–1842, to honor George M. Totten, one of the expedition's midshipmen. Totten Glacier on the Budd Coast of Antarctica is also named for George Totten.

== Geography ==
The inlet extends 9 miles (14 km) southwest from the western end of Squaxin Passage, and much of the county line between Mason and Thurston counties runs down the center of it. A spit extends west for about 300 feet (91 m) from Steamboat Island. The inlet shoals gradually to near Burns Point, 100 feet (30 m) high, on the south shore, where it bares at low tide.

Totten Inlet splits into two smaller inlets, Oyster Bay and Little Skookum Inlet. Oyster Bay, located south of Burns Point, is an extensive mudflat.

== Environment and ecology ==
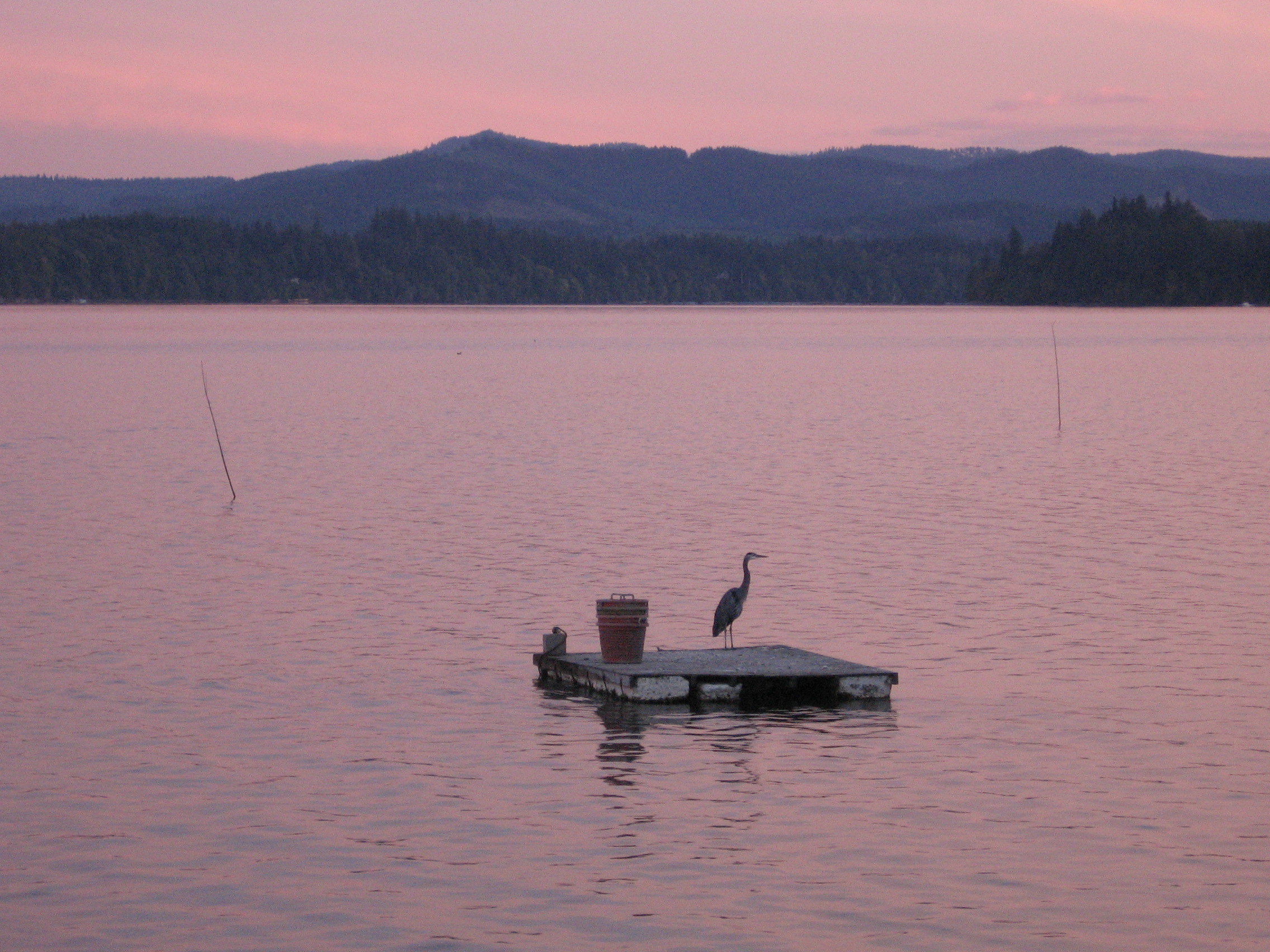
A great blue heron rests on an oyster raft in Totten Inlet, 2005

In 2026, Capitol Land Trust (CLT) and Taylor Shellfish Farms (TSF) completed a conservation effort to permanently protect a 218-acre (88 ha) freshwater and saltwater shoreline parcel spanning 2.5 miles (4.0 km). Requiring five different grants, CLT purchased the easement for $5 million; the effort, which also included support from numerous federal, state, and local agencies or organizations, was the most expensive undertaking in the trust's history at the time. As of 2026, the undeveloped area is privately owned by TSF and is not open to the public. The protected area includes a 7.8-acre (3.2 ha) estuary located in Hudson Cove. The habitat also includes feeder bluffs, a conifer forest with old-growth cedar, and marsh wetlands. The trust previously protected a similar parcel near Adams Cove, immediately south of Hudson Cove.

Five species of salmon are noted to use the freshwater streams that empty into Hudson Cove. The shoreline is home to Pacific herring.

== Economy ==
Oysters are grown in this area, and there are log booms. Totten Inlet is one of Washington's most productive areas for growing oysters. Oysters grow extremely fast in the inlet's algae-rich water. Taylor Shellfish, the United States' largest producer of farmed shellfish, got its start in Totten Inlet and is headquartered near its waters.

== See also ==
- List of geographic features in Thurston County, Washington
