= Oakland Bay =

Body of water in Washington state, US

Coordinates: 47°13′30″N 123°03′26″W

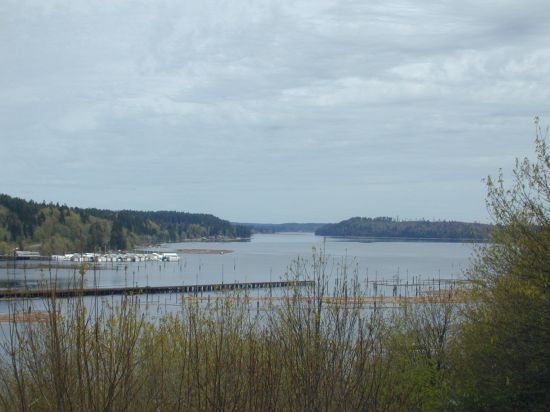
Oakland Bay seen from the juncture with Hammersley Inlet, looking north.

Oakland Bay is a tidal estuarial body of water near the city of Shelton, Washington. Oakland Bay is the terminus of Hammersley Inlet, which connects the bay and inlet to the larger Puget Sound. (Peter Puget’s orders and focus were to look for the Northwest Passage, and as Hammersley Inlet is westward and a large cove hides its entrance, Lieutenant Puget missed the inlet in his charting for Captain George Vancouver on the ship HMS Discovery.) Oakland sat at the end of both Oakland Bay and Hammersley Inlet, where Mason Lake Road now meets State Route 3; Oakland was the first county seat of Mason County. The community of Bay Shore, Washington, was located on Oakland Bay. The Sierra Pacific Mill, which was the Simpson Timber Company and ITT/Rayonier mill, occupies the Oakland Bay waterfront at the City of Shelton. The bay’s major freshwater inlet is Goldsborough Creek, which runs through the City of Shelton (Robert Goldsborough was the commissary officer for Territorial Governor Isaac Stevens’ treaty councils), as does Shelton Creek - these two creeks sandwich the mill and the waterfront; several other creeks, each with their own different salmon run, also empty into Oakland Bay, among them, starting nearest the mouth of Hammersley Inlet, Mill Creek, Shelton Creek, Johns Creek, Cranberry Creek, Deer Creek, and Malaney Creek.
