= Squaxin Island =

Island in the Puget Sound of Washington, United States

Coordinates: 47.1974°N 122.9119°W

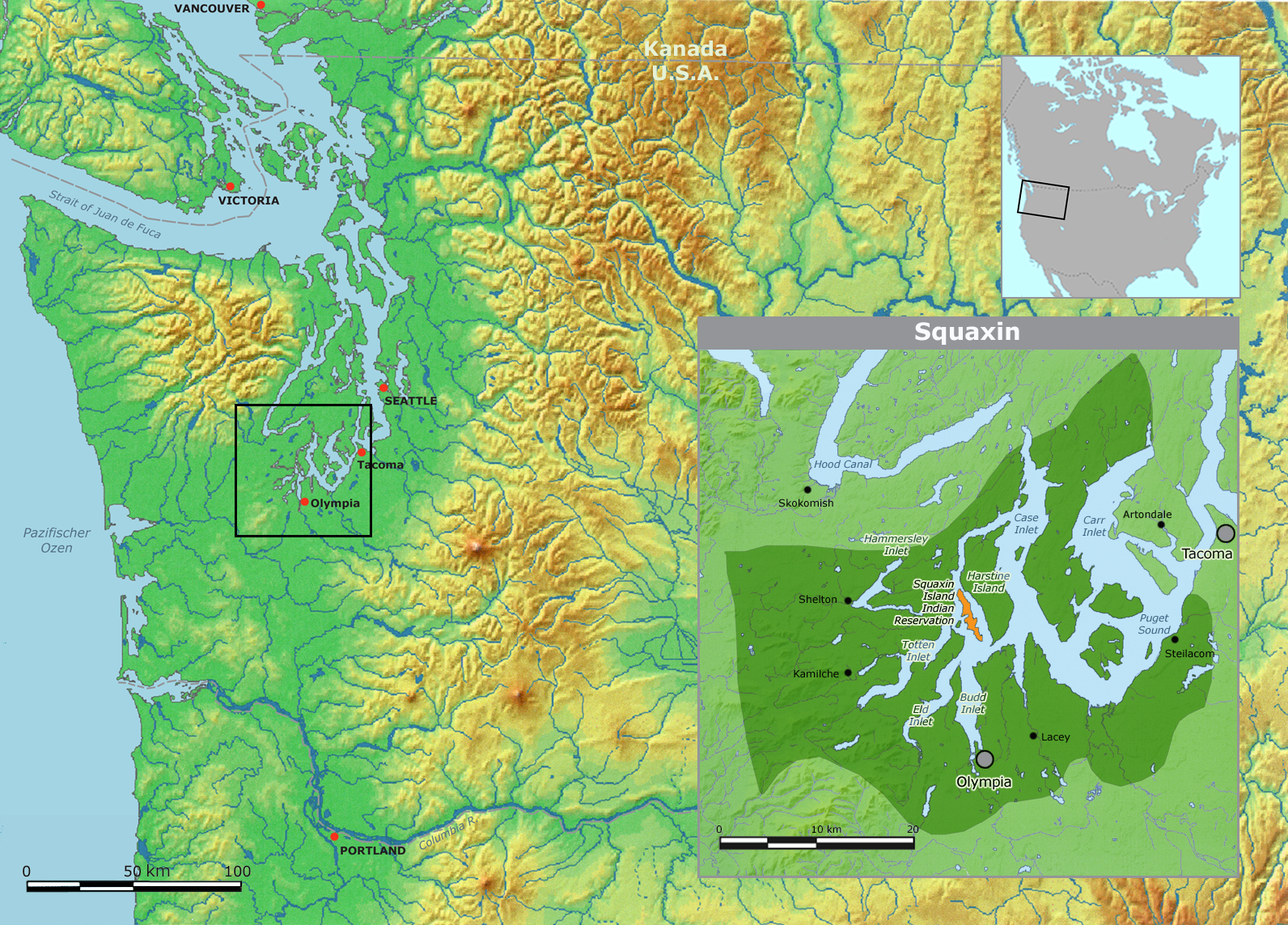
Location of Squaxin Island

Squaxin Island is in the extreme southwestern part of Puget Sound in Mason County, Washington, United States. The island is an Indian reservation of the Native American Squaxin Island Tribe. The island's land area is 5.739 km^{2} (2.216 sq mi). There was no resident population as of the 2000 census.

Squaxin Island is separated from Harstine Island to the east by Peale Passage.

The island's name comes from the Lushootseed place–name sqʷax̌səd.

== Squaxin Island State Park ==
The island was formerly home to a Washington state park by the same name, opened in 1965. The park was accessed by tidelands leased for 25 years from the Squaxin Island Tribe. In 1993, negotiations between the tribe and state to renew the lease ended unsuccessfully, cutting off public access. The park was closed, and its land sold back to the tribe in 2015.

== Derelict vessel removal ==
Squaxin Island is located at a key point in a hydrological corridor, leading to the accumulation of numerous abandoned and derelict vessels on its shores over decades. Since 2002, Washington State has implemented a boat removal program to address this issue, successfully removing over 1,200 derelict vessels from the island. As of June 2025, approximately 300 vessels remain. To tackle particularly challenging cases, the state employed a firefighting helicopter to transport 14 vessels from the island to the mainland, demonstrating significant efforts to mitigate environmental and navigational hazards caused by the abandoned boats.

== See also ==
- Squaxin Island Tribe
