= Summer Camping =

- Written by: Sam Gesser
- Presented by: Alan Mills; Louis Thomas
- Country of origin: Canada
- Original language: English
- No. of seasons: 1

Production
- Producer: Alan Brown
- Production location: Montreal
- Running time: 30 minutes

Original release
- Network: CBC Television
- Release: 1 July – 26 August 1957

Summer Camping is a Canadian outdoor interest television program that aired on CBC Television in 1957.

== Premise ==
This program, produced at CBC Montreal, featured instructions from Louis Thomas on canoeing, fire starting, fishing, wood carving and other camping techniques. This was accompanied by campfire songs by musician Alan Mills. Children were featured in the studio audience, as the series was intended for young audiences.

== Scheduling ==
Summer Camping was broadcast on Mondays at 5:00 p.m. from 1 July to 26 August 1957.
