= Herron Island =

- Census-designated place
- Location within Washington (state)
- Coordinates: 47°15′52″N 122°50′04″W
- Country: United States
- State: Washington
- County: Pierce

Area
  - Total: 0.4759 sq mi (1.2326 km^{2})
- Elevation: 115 ft (35 m)

Population (2010)
  - Total: 151
- ZIP Code: 98349
- Area code: 253
- GNIS feature ID: 2584981
- Website: www.herronisland.org

Herron Island is an island and census-designated place in central Case Inlet in the southern part of Puget Sound in the U.S. state of Washington. The Pierce County island has a land area of 1.2326 km^{2} (304.57 acres) and a population of 151 persons as of the 2010 census.

Herron Island is one of the few privately owned islands in Puget Sound. All access to the island is by boat, mostly aboard the HMC ferry, the "Charlie Wells", and a guest pass signed by an HMC member is necessary to board the ferry. The island is 1.25 miles (2.01 km) long, and 1/2 mile (800 m) across.

Corporate properties include the North Beach Park and small boat docks, the South Beach (undeveloped), roads and rights of way, Goodpastor Park and adjacent wetlands, Community Building and Fire Station, water system, ferry and ferry docks, as well as numerous greenbelt lots throughout the island. All other land is privately owned. Ownership of waterfront lots includes the tidelands down to the mean sea level.

== History ==
Herron Island was named by Charles Wilkes during the Wilkes Expedition of 1838–1842, to honor Lewis Herron, the expedition's cooper.

Herron Island is a completely private island. It was incorporated on April 30, 1958, as Herron Maintenance Co. (HMC), a non-profit, non-stock Washington corporation consisting of the owners and purchasers of property on Herron Island. HMC is governed by its bylaws and administered by an unsalaried Board of Trustees elected annually from the membership. The Board is responsible for overseeing the operations and maintenance of the corporation's properties, and establishing a balanced budget to fund these operations. Herron Island is funded solely by annual and special assessments paid by the members and by the ferry fee.

=== 1792 ===
Lieutenant Peter Puget, under the command of Captain George Vancouver, explored what is now known as Case Inlet in Puget Sound, in May 1792. On the 23rd of May, the sailors didn't get underway until 8:00 AM, much later than usual, due to the very heavy fog in the area. Because a new group of Indians was encountered at the mouth of the Nisqually river, and Lt. Puget didn't know whether they were friendly or not, the ship delayed landing until 2:00 PM that afternoon. Just after the landing, another squall, with heavy rains and wind gusts, prevented them from proceeding any further that day.

The tiny island they landed upon was dubbed "Wednesday Island". It was actually Tuesday here, but the Vancouver expedition used "England time" throughout their explorations.

The ship's botanist, Archibald Menzies, whose job it was to explore every place they landed, refused to venture from the landing site to collect soil and botanical specimens, due to the heavy rain and wind.

=== 1841 ===
In 1841, Lieutenant Charles Wilkes of the United States Navy, re-explored, re-charted (and frequently renamed) the islands of Puget Sound.

Large and important islands were renamed for his most important sailors. Smaller islands were renamed for his lesser sailors. Lt. Wilkes renamed Wednesday Island for Seaman Herron.

== Demographics ==
Historical population
Census	Pop.	Note	%±
2010	151		—
2020	150		−0.7%
U.S. Decennial Census; 2000 2010

Herron Island first appeared as a census designated place in the 2010 U.S. census.

=== Racial and ethnic composition ===
Herron Island CDP, Washington – Racial and ethnic composition Note: the US Census treats Hispanic/Latino as an ethnic category. This table excludes Latinos from the racial categories and assigns them to a separate category. Hispanics/Latinos may be of any race.
Race / Ethnicity (NH = Non-Hispanic)	Pop 2010	Pop 2020	% 2010	% 2020
White alone (NH)	140	129	92.72%	86.00%
Black or African American alone (NH)	0	1	0.00%	0.67%
Native American or Alaska Native alone (NH)	1	0	0.66%	0.00%
Asian alone (NH)	3	0	1.99%	0.00%
Native Hawaiian or Pacific Islander alone (NH)	0	1	0.00%	0.67%
Other race alone (NH)	0	0	0.00%	0.00%
Mixed race or Multiracial (NH)	4	15	2.65%	10.00%
Hispanic or Latino (any race)	3	4	1.99%	2.67%
Total	151	150	100.00%	100.00%
