= Harstine Island, Washington =

Island in Washington state, United States

- Unincorporated community
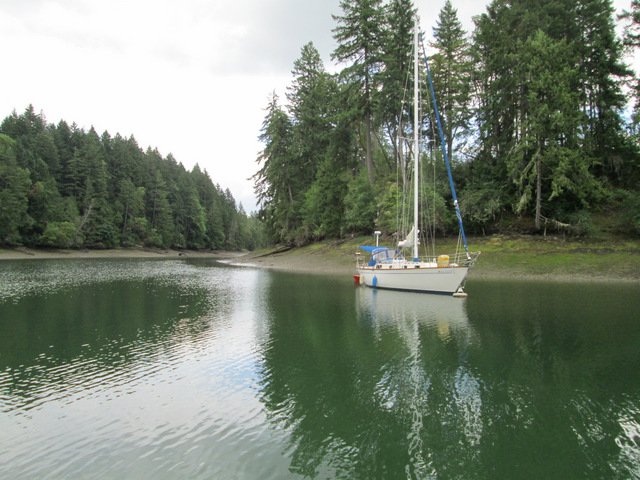
- Jarrell Cove State Park, Harstine Island

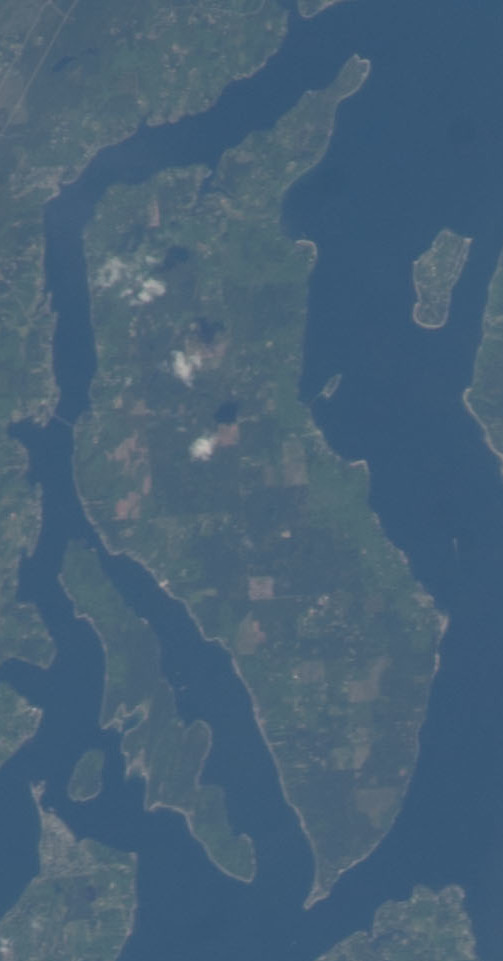

- Location within Washington (state) Location within the United States
- Coordinates: 47°16′35″N 122°53′14″W
- Country: United States
- State: Washington
- County: Mason
- Elevation: 59 ft (18 m)
- Time zone: UTC-8 (Pacific (PST))
  - Summer (DST): UTC-7 (PDT)
- GNIS feature ID: 1511026

Harstine Island (also known simply as Harstine or Hartstene) is an island in Mason County, Washington, United States. The US Census recognizes it as an unincorporated community. The island is located west of Case Inlet in southern Puget Sound, 16 km (9.9 mi) north of Olympia. It has a land area of 48.305 km^{2} (18.651 sq mi), and had a population of 1,412 as of the 2010 census.

Pickering Passage, to the northwest, separates the island from the mainland, while Case Inlet, to the east, separates it from the Key Peninsula. Squaxin Island lies to the southwest, separated by Peale Passage. To the south, Harstine Island is separated from the mainland by Dana Passage. The island is home to Jarrell Cove State Park and Harstine Island State Park.

== History ==
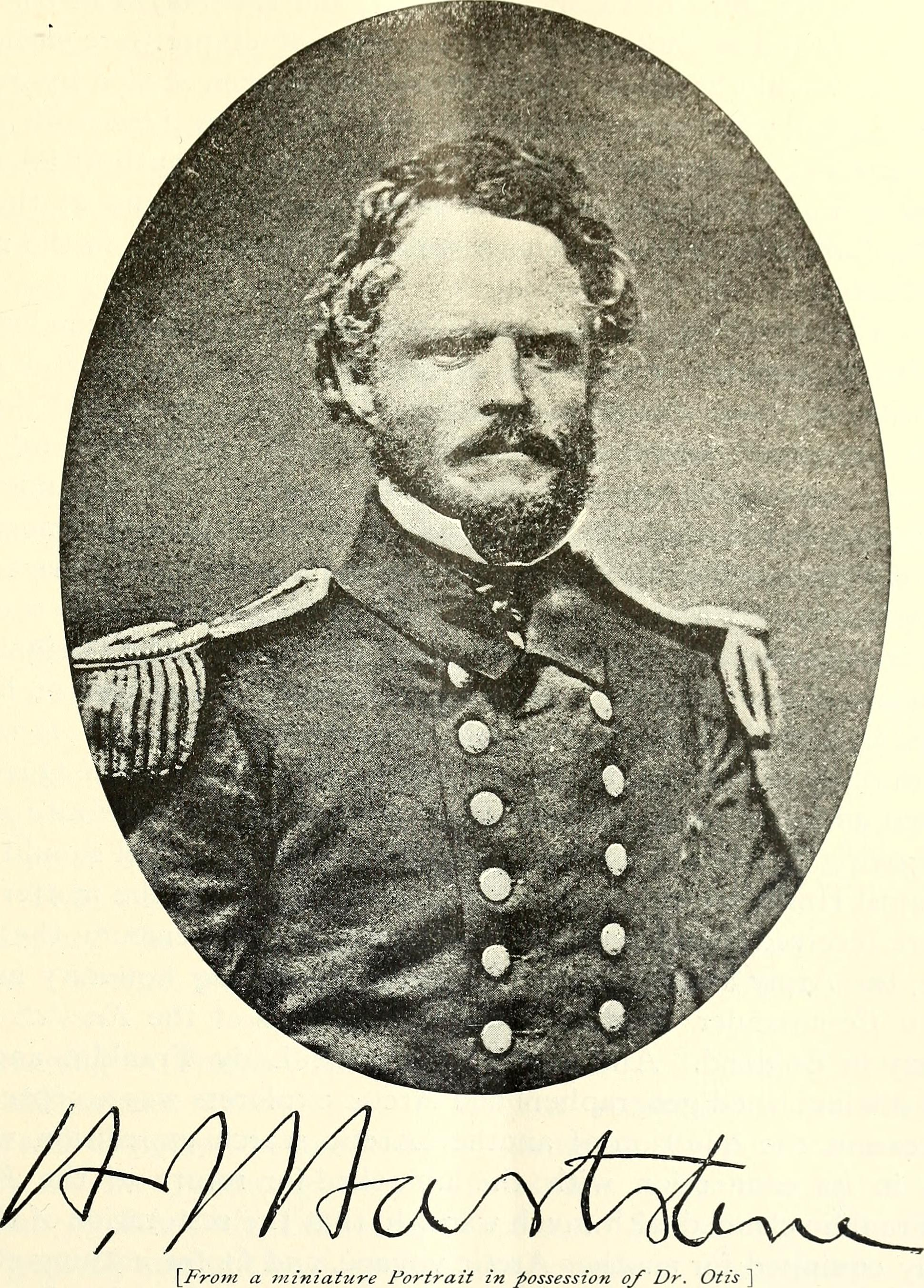
H.J. Hartstene

On August 18, 1838 a group of ships led by commanding officer, U.S. Navy Lt. Charles Wilkes (1798–1877) and referred to as the Wilkes Expedition or the United States Exploring Expedition left from Hampton Roads in Virginia on the east coast of United States for a round the world expedition. In 1841 the expedition explored much of the west coast including Puget Sound. The island was named by Lt. Wilkes for Lt. Henry J. Hartstene ~1801–March 31, 1868. (or Hartstein).

Robert and Philura Jarrell are recorded as the first settlers of European descent to arrive on the island in 1878. Jarrell Cove, on the northern side of the island, and Jarrell Cove State Park bear their name today. The Harstine Island Community Hall was constructed in 1914 and became a nexus of social life on the island, playing host to the local grange, women's clubs, and as a community gathering space.

From 1922 to 1969, a ferry owned and operated by Mason County, Washington crossed Pickering Passage to link Harstine Island to the mainland. The ferry was replaced by a bridge in 1969.

== Spelling ==
For most of the island's history, there wasn't a single standard spelling of its name. Even today, several different spellings are used.

Of the several possible ways to spell the name of the island, Hartstene and Harstine are the most used and most popular. Alternate spellings of the name include Hartstene, Harsteen, Harstein, Harstene, Hartstein and Harstine. In 1997 Washington State Legislative action resulted in the name officially becoming Harstine Island.

Although Lt. Henry J. Hartstene wasn't a member of the expedition during the Puget Sound survey, his name, as well as that of Samuel Stretch, were given to the islands probably because they impressed Lt. Wilkes when they led a successful mission to get supplies to stranded shipmates earlier in the voyage while Wilkes had temporary command of Hartstein's ship, the Porpoise.

Some of the confusion with spellings were caused by the man himself. When Lt. Hartstene's name was published before 1855, the 'Hartstein' spelling was used, including the account he wrote himself of the Arctic expedition he led in 1855. Most maps from the 1840s to the 1890s spelled the island 'Hartstein'. In the 1850s, Lt. Hartstene began using the 'Hartstene' spelling. His biography was listed in a book published in 1994 called The Concise Dictionary of American Jewish Biography without confirmation of that he had Jewish heritage. The authors admit they included some of the 24,000 people in the book because they had Jewish-sounding names. The family began effort to use the spelling 'Hartstene' from then on in conjunction with his notoriety gained in the 1850s due to his Arctic expedition, and then sailing HMS Resolute to the United Kingdom and presenting it personally to Queen Victoria in 1856, he used it almost exclusively.

There's a photo of him autographed 'H.J. Hartstene' and a Civil War photo of him labeled "Capt. Hartstein". He, his wife, and daughter were each listed as Hartstein on the passenger list of the steamer Fulton, the ship that took them to Le Havre, France in 1867, the year before he died. However, his obituary in 1868, his daughter's in 1880, and his wife's in 1903, all used Hartstene. Since map makers knew the island was named after him, they followed suit. The United States General Land Office's official map changed from Hartstein to Hartstene between 1883 and 1887. Many maps from the 1860s and throughout the 20th century used Hartstene. The Hartstine spelling appeared on a few maps in the 1890s, followed by Harstine in the early 1900s. The post office on the north side of the island that operated from 1892-1926 was probably always called 'Harstine Island', but who first used that spelling is unknown.

The Captain's family lived in Newark, NJ most of his life, and his ships often sailed out of New York Harbor. As the New York Times digitized all of their newspaper articles since 1851, there are indexed photos of various spellings of the Harstine name, most as "Harstein" and none as "Harstine".

Five of the instances of Hartstene came after his death :

- Charles Wilkes lists in his 1845 book, Narrative of the U.S. Exploring Expedition, Lieutenant H.J. Hartstein was a member of the crew of the United States Brig Porpoise, then joined the crew of the ship Relief at Callao. The Relief, deemed too slow to stay with the expedition, was ordered on July 12, 1839, to bring supplies to Hawaii and Sydney, Australia before returning to the east coast.
- Edmond Stephen Meany reported in his 1910 book History of the State of Washington that Hartstene Island was named for Lieutenant H.J. Hartstein.
- Edmond S. Meany reported in his 1923 book Origin of Washington Geographic Names that Hartstene Island was named for Lieutenant Henry J. Hartstene
- According to the book The Washington Historical Quarterly By Washington University State Historical Society it is Harstine Island, named after an officer whose family name was undoubtedly Hartstene.
- Dr. Harry W. Deegan reports in his 1971 (revised) book History of Mason County Washington That Harstine Island is named for Lieutenant H. J. Harstine of the 1838-1841 Wilkes Expedition. This is mentioned in connection with an exploration of the Mason County area in 1845 by Michael T. Simmons and 8 others that was guided by Peter Borcier who had earlier guided for the Wilkes Expedition
- The web page Hartstenepointe.org sums the naming argument up "Hartstene Pointe Maintenance Association - A gated community on the north end of Harstine Island". The island is named Harstine, but several concerns related to the island are spelled Hartstene.

== Transport ==
Harstine Island is not served by any railways or highways, but only by local county roads. The nearest state highway to the island is State Route 3.

Before a bridge was constructed, the island was served by the Harstine Island ferry. The cost in 1962 was 50¢ (fifty cents) for car and passengers. The Bridge dedication was held on June 22, 1969, starting at 2 pm.

== Landmarks ==
The Harstine Island Community Hall, built in the early 20th century, is listed on the National Register of Historic Places.
