= Case Inlet =

Arm of water in Washington, United States

Coordinates: 47°15′44.2″N 122°49′37″W

Case Inlet, in southern Puget Sound in the U.S. state of Washington, is an arm of water between Key Peninsula to the east and Harstine Island to the west. Its northern end, called North Bay, reaches nearly to Hood Canal, creating the defining isthmus of Kitsap Peninsula. Case Inlet is the boundary between Pierce County and Mason County. The southern end of Case Inlet connects to Nisqually Reach, part of the southern basin of Puget Sound. Herron Island lies in Case Inlet.

Case Inlet was named by Charles Wilkes of the Wilkes Expedition of 1838–1842, to honor Augustus L. Case, one of the expedition's officers. From the 1870s to the 1920s, transportation needs of the communities along Case Inlet were served by a small flotilla of steamboats.

== History ==
The Case Inlet is an estuary, which is where a river or a stream meets the shoreline in turn freshwater mixes with saltwater to form a protected habitat. This environment is important in feeding and providing resting grounds for fish, birds, and mammal life in the Puget Sound.

The water quality of the Case Inlet or North Bay reflects many of the water issues in the South Puget Sound. The depth of the Inlet is shallower, and the flush time is much slower than the main basin of the Sound. The many Inlets and the complex structure of the Puget Sound cause a longer retention time of water than simpler systems. The Case Inlet tidal exchange can have water residence times up to two months, and the water will not dilute or mix nutrients to the same degree as that as areas like the Tacoma Narrows.

The Case Inlet has an abundance of nutrients entering the South Sound from freshwater only mixing with upper water columns. Nutrients and sunlight in the upper water column of the shallow water create ideal conditions for phytoplankton growth which can affect water quality. Phytoplankton live suspended in water, needing sunlight and nutrients, nitrogen and phosphorus to grow. Low nitrogen levels typically limit phytoplankton growth in marine waters, while phosphorus limits growth in freshwaters.

Low nutrients limit phytoplankton growth, common in the summer, so when nutrients are added, it will cause more phytoplankton than normal to grow. Some plankton blooms are harmful for marine life and humans and can create conditions of excess algae populations that will sink and accumulate on the seafloor where the bacteria will break down, consuming oxygen in the process. Thus, excessive algae growth can cause lower oxygen levels which are detrimental to the maintenance of marine life.

== Biota ==
Many forms of marine life reside in Case Inlet, ranging from eelgrass to harbor seals. The nearshore environment offers a place of refuge from larger predators and provides an abundance of food sources that support a complex and interconnected food web.

Although eelgrass is not an animal, it sits at the foundation of the marine ecosystem. It provides shelter and a nursery habitat for young salmon, shrimp, crab, and forage fish. If eelgrass declines, it becomes a major environmental concern because its loss impacts nearly every species that depends on it.

Oysters, including both Olympia and Pacific varieties, are found in large numbers along the shoreline. The Pacific oyster was introduced from Japan in 1902, while Olympia oysters are native to Washington and were first sourced from the southern Puget Sound area and Willapa Bay. Both species contribute to water filtration, shoreline health, and marine biodiversity.

Another important species is the Dungeness crab, which is most abundant in eelgrass beds or muddy substrates throughout the Puget Sound, north of Seattle, on the Hood Canal, and near the Pacific Coast. The crabs are also found in Case Inlet as it holds cultural, commercial, and recreational significance. This crab species is common throughout the inlet but is sensitive to habitat loss, declining water quality, and ocean acidification, all of which can impact population stability.

Case Inlet is also home to Chum salmon, which is typically one to two inches long during their juvenile stage. They are often seen as schooling in the shallow shoreline areas of North Bay during the spring and early summer. Their presence in shallow waters highlights the importance of protecting nearshore habitats that young salmon rely on for survival.

Harbor seals are one of the most notable marine mammals in Case Inlet, often seen resting on rocks or quiet shorelines where they haul out to warm themselves and care for their young. They feed salmon, herring, and other small fish, making them important predators that help maintain balance in the inlet food web. Because they rely on clean, productive waters, their presence is a strong indicator of overall ecosystem health. However, human activities such as shoreline development and increased boat traffic can disturb their habitat and reduce access to safe resting and feeding areas.

The inlet also supports a variety of marine birds, including the Great Blue Heron and the Bald Eagle. Herons depend on shallow waters for hunting small fish and other prey. Bald Eagles, on the other hand, are apex predators known for their exceptional eyesight about four times stronger than a human’s which allows them to spot prey from great distances. The Pacific Northwest remains one of their strongest habitats, with populations thriving from Alaska to northern Mexico. The presence of these birds highlights the ecological richness and biodiversity found along Case Inlet’s shores.
