= Heritage Hall =

Heritage Hall may refer to:

- Heritage Hall (Indianapolis), a building within the Lockerbie Square Historic District
- Heritage Hall (University of Southern California), at University of Southern California
- Heritage Hall (Valparaiso University)
- Heritage Hall (Vancouver), a designated heritage building in Vancouver
- Long Lake Recreation Hall, formally known as Heritage Hall, located in Lacey, Washington and listed on the National Register of Historic Places
- Old U.S. Post Office (Marion, Ohio), also known as Heritage Hall, listed on the National Register of Historic Places
