= Timberline High School (Lacey, Washington) =

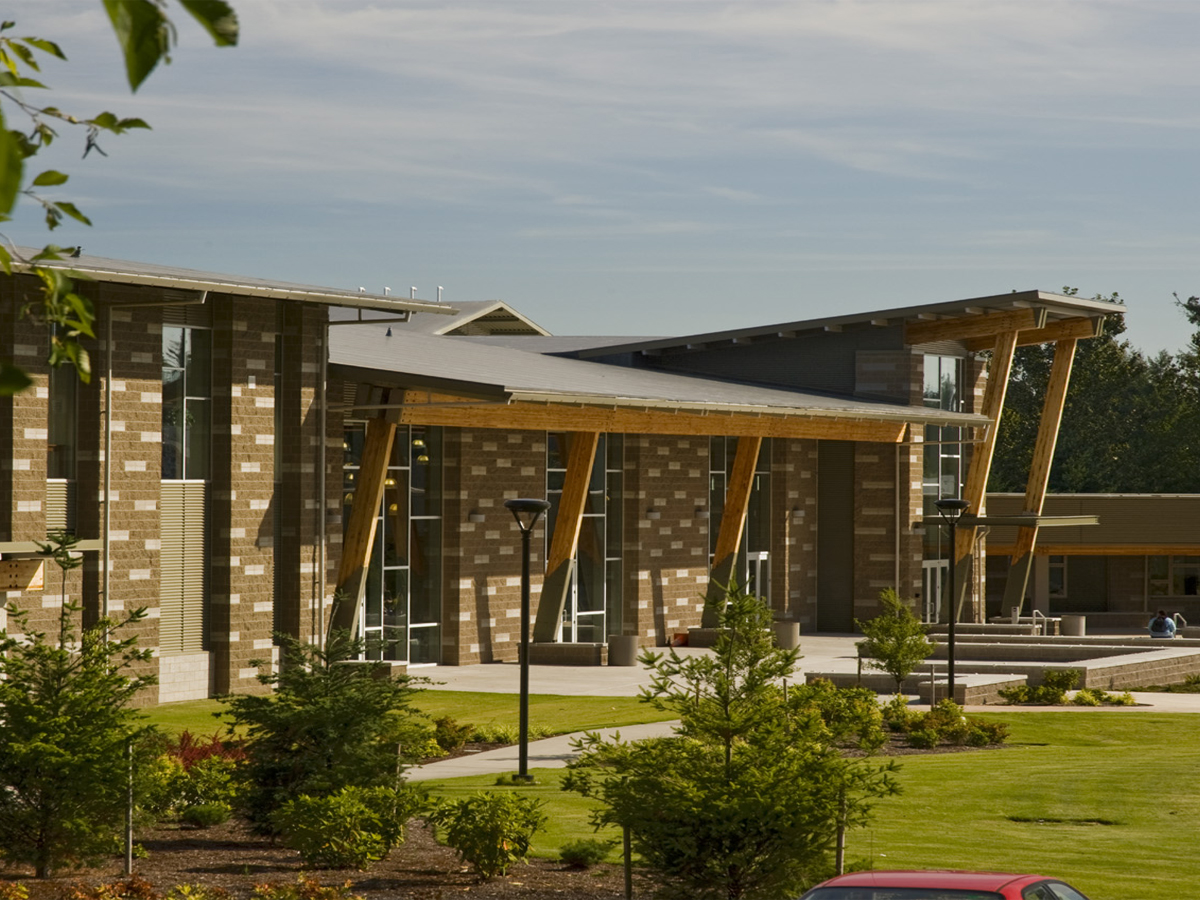
- Timberline High School Campus

Location
- 6120 Mullen Road SE; Lacey, Washington; United States; 47°00′27″N 122°48′00″W

Information
- Type: Public
- Established: 1970, 2019 (current)
- School district: North Thurston Public Schools
- Principal: Paul Dean
- Faculty: 65.10 (FTE)
- Grades: 9–12
- Enrollment: 1,426 (2023-2024)
- Student to teacher ratio: 21.90
- Campus: Suburban
- Colors: Green & Gold
- Athletics conference: District Three, South Sound Conference (3A)
- Nickname: Blazers
- Rival: River Ridge
- Newspaper: The Blazer
- Yearbook: The Cairn
- Website: Timberline High School

Timberline High School is a comprehensive public secondary school in Lacey, Washington. Opened in 1970 and part of North Thurston Public Schools, its school colors are green and gold and the mascot is a blazer.

Timberline primarily receives students from Komachin Middle School. At one point the school building was also home to the experimental high school, New Century High School. Timberline's original floor plan was open, similar to the Juanita concept; the original building was fully demolished during the 2007–08 school year.

== Notable alumni ==
- Ed Murray, Mayor of Seattle Elected Mayor of Seattle in 2013
- Tom Dutra, Seattle Sounders FC goalkeeper coach
- Ron Holmes, NFL defensive end
- Rickie Lee Jones, singer/songwriter (did not graduate)
- Jeff Monson, wrestler; 2x Gold Medalist (99' and 05') ADCC Submission Wrestling World Championships, current mixed martial artist formerly for the Ultimate Fighting Championship
- Erik Stevenson, basketball player
- Jonathan Stewart, NFL running back
- Buford O. Furrow, perpetrator of the 1999 Los Angeles Jewish Community Center shooting.

== History ==
The original building was completed in 1970. During the first week of school in 1970, the 700 students that attended met in the gym because it was the only completed part of the building.

The school building had an open-concept design and the class schedule was a flexible modular one, based on 15-minute increments. Nearly all instruction was individualized.

The first major change to scheduling was in the 1976–77 school year, which had a more traditional 7-period schedule. In 1978, it was changed to a 6-period schedule. The math department was the last to conduct primarily individualized instruction, doing so until the 1982–1983 school year.

Major changes to the building took place in 1980 with a $3.3 million construction project. Some classes were held in portables until spring 1981. The construction included the Language-Arts building, auto shop, graphics and journalism areas, weight room and wrestling addition, and the student commons.

During the 1985–86 school year, the softball and soccer fields were added. In 1987, the all-weather track was completed. In 2000, the swimming pool was renovated.

In 1989, the heating and air conditioning systems were updated.

In 2006, voters approved a $66 million fund to build a new main building, and in 2008, the new building was opened and the old main building demolished later that year.

== See also ==
- North Thurston High School
- River Ridge High School
