= Tanglewilde, Washington =

- CDP
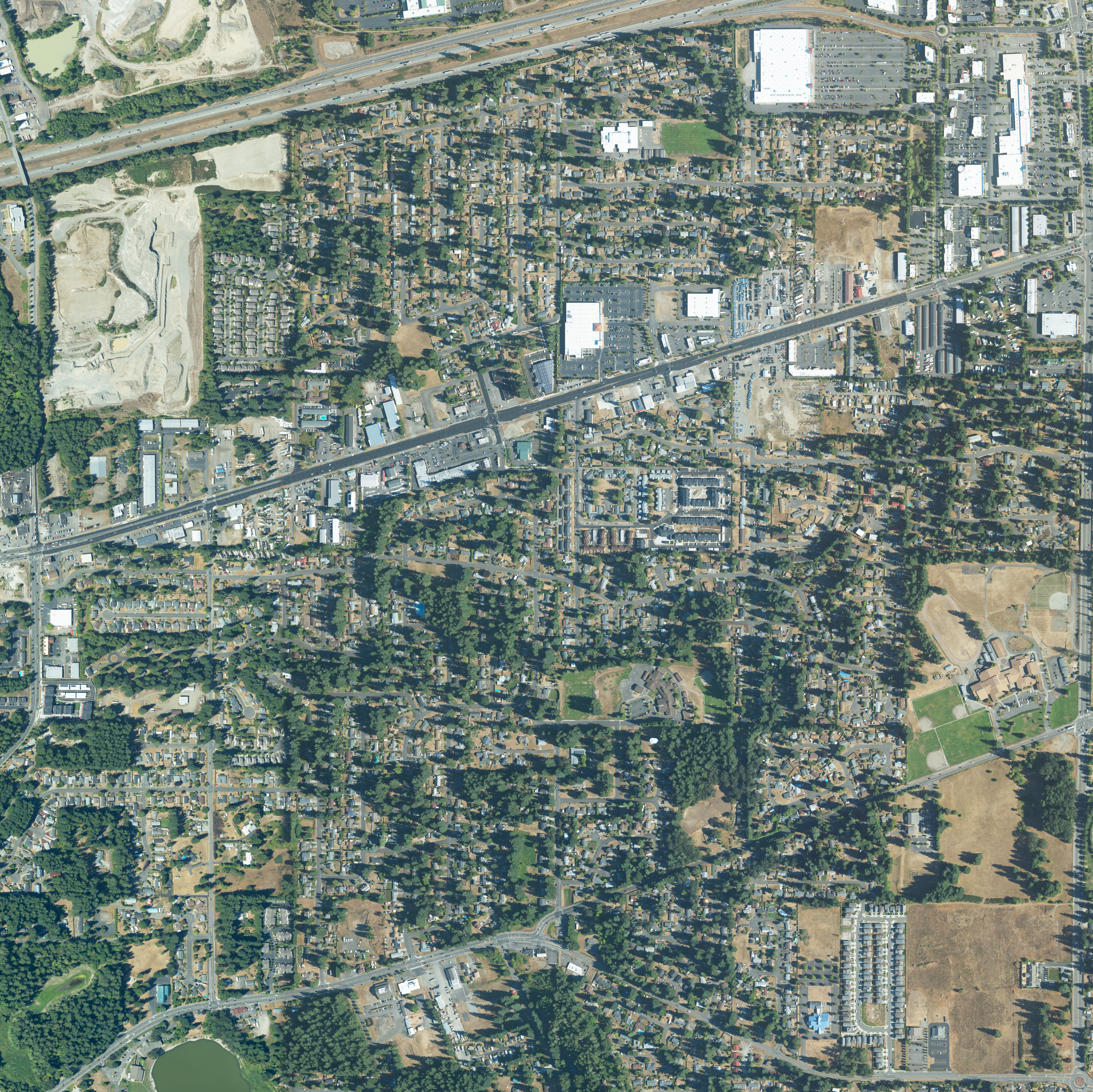
- Tanglewilde in August 2023
- Coordinates: 47°3′6″N 122°46′53″W
- Country: United States
- State: Washington
- County: Thurston

Area
  - Total: 1.4 sq mi (3.7 km^{2})
  - Land: 1.4 sq mi (3.7 km^{2})
  - Water: 0 sq mi (0.0 km^{2})
- Elevation: 203 ft (62 m)

Population (2020)
  - Total: 6,265
  - Density: 4,400/sq mi (1,700/km^{2})
- Time zone: UTC-8 (Pacific (PST))
  - Summer (DST): UTC-7 (PDT)
- ZIP codes: 98503, 98516
- Area codes: 360, 564
- FIPS code: 53-70297

Tanglewilde (also Tanglewilde-Thompson Place) is a census-designated place (CDP) in Thurston County, Washington, United States, part of the Urban Growth Area of the city of Lacey. As of the 2020 census, Tanglewilde had a population of 6,265.

The community is surrounded by the city of Lacey and borders Mushroom Corner. The sections of Tanglewilde and Thompson Place are divided south and north, respectively, by Martin Way. Interstate 5 forms the northern border of the CDP, and Washington State Route 510 partially forms the eastern limits.

== Geography ==
According to the United States Census Bureau, the CDP has a total area of 1.5 square miles (3.8 km^{2}), all of it land.

== Demographics ==
Historical population
Census	Pop.	Note	%±
1970	3,423		—
1980	5,910		72.7%
1990	6,061		2.6%
2000	5,670		−6.5%
2010	5,892		3.9%
2020	6,265		6.3%
U.S. Decennial Census; 1960 1970 1980 1990; 2000 2010 2020; As Thompson Place-Tanglewilde in 1970 and as Tanglewilde-Thompson Place 1980-2000

The community was first listed as an unincorporated community under the name Thompson Place-Tanglewilde in the 1970 U.S. census; and then as Tanglewilde-Thompson Place in the 1980 U.S. census. The name was changed to Tanglewilde prior to the 2010 U.S. census.

=== 2000 census ===
As of the census of 2000, there were 5,670 people, 2,057 households, and 1,491 families residing in the CDP. The population density was 3,919.1 people per square mile (1,509.8/km^{2}). There were 2,167 housing units at an average density of 1,497.8/sq mi (577.0/km^{2}). The racial makeup of the CDP was 76.04% White, 5.04% African American, 2.17% Native American, 8.95% Asian, 1.06% Pacific Islander, 3.67% from other races, and 6.07% from two or more races. Hispanic or Latino of any race were 9.10% of the population.

There were 2,057 households, out of which 39.5% had children under the age of 18 living with them, 52.4% were married couples living together, 15.8% had a female householder with no husband present, and 27.5% were non-families. 20.0% of all households were made up of individuals, and 5.1% had someone living alone who was 65 years of age or older. The average household size was 2.76 and the average family size was 3.14.

In the CDP, the age distribution of the population shows 29.5% under the age of 18, 10.7% from 18 to 24, 29.2% from 25 to 44, 22.5% from 45 to 64, and 8.1% who were 65 years of age or older. The median age was 32 years. For every 100 females, there were 95.9 males. For every 100 females age 18 and over, there were 91.5 males.

The median income for a household in the CDP was $45,000, and the median income for a family was $49,245. Males had a median income of $35,352 versus $29,435 for females. The per capita income for the CDP was $21,154. About 8.9% of families and 13.0% of the population were below the poverty line, including 15.7% of those under age 18 and 9.1% of those age 65 or over.

== Parks and recreation ==
Lake Lois Habitat Reserve and the Woodland Creek Community Park are immediately southwest of the community.

== Education ==
Tanglewilde is within the North Thurston Public Schools district. Elementary schools in the area include Lydia Hawk and Olympic View. The main middle school is Nisqually Middle School. Most high school students in Tanglewilde attend River Ridge High School.
