= Washington State Route 510 =

State highway in Thurston County, Washington, US

State Route 510

- A map of the area located between Tacoma and Chehalis showing SR 510, highlighted in red.

Route information
- Auxiliary route of I-5
- Maintained by WSDOT
- Length: 13.10 mi (21.08 km)
- Existed: 1964–present

Major junctions
- West end: I-5 in Lacey
- East end: SR 507 in Yelm

Location
- Country: United States
- State: Washington
- Counties: Thurston

Highway system
- State highways in Washington; Interstate; US; State; Scenic; Pre-1964; 1964 renumbering; Former
← SR 509	→ SR 512

State Route 510 (SR 510) is a state highway in Thurston County, Washington. The 13 miles (20.9 km) long highway extends southeast from an interchange with Interstate 5 (I-5) in Lacey to SR 507 in Yelm. SR 510 roughly parallels the Nisqually River, the border between Thurston and Pierce counties, between the Fort Lewis and Nisqually Indian Community area to Yelm.

The roadway was built by 1916 as a connector from Saint Clair Lake to the Northern Pacific Railway station in Yelm and was designated as Secondary State Highway 5I (SSH 5I) in 1937. The original route of SSH 5I ran from Tumwater east to Yelm, following the present-day Yelm Highway. In 1959, the highway was realigned to serve a new freeway, later I-5, in Lacey; SSH 5I was replaced in the 1964 highway renumbering by SR 510. The Yelm-Tenino Trail was built over the Northern Pacific line in 1993 and a bypass is being constructed around Yelm.

== Route description ==
SR 510 begins as Marvin Road at exit 111, a diverging diamond interchange on Interstate 5 (I-5) in southern Lacey. The highway travels south by the Hawks Prairie Village Mall, home of the Hawks Prairie Center, a division of the South Puget Sound Community College. South of the mall is the Martin Way intersection, located west of River Ridge High School and one of the busiest intersections on the roadway at a daily average of 24,000 motorists in 2008, and the Pacific Avenue roundabout, where SR 510 turns east, renamed Pacific Avenue, northeast of Long Lake. After leaving Lacey city limits, the roadway begins to parallel the Quadlok line formerly operated by Tacoma Rail south towards the Old Pacific Highway. At the Old Pacific Highway, the road becomes the St. Clair Cutoff Road, named for nearby Saint Clair Lake, and crosses the railroad tracks twice. After turning northeast, parallel to Saint Clair Lake's shoreline, the highway dips southeast, now parallel to the Nisqually River, into Fort Lewis and the Nisqually Indian Community. Outside of the community, SR 510 is renamed the Yelm Highway and passes Southworth Elementary. After intersecting Mudd Run Road, future western terminus of the Yelm Loop, the roadway enters Yelm city limits. After turning southeast, SR 510 becomes Yelm Avenue and serves Yelm High School. Shortly thereafter, the roadway crosses the Yelm-Tenino Trail, a 7.4-mile (11.9 km) long rail trail in operation since 1993, and ends at First Street, signed as SR 507, which continues southeast as Yelm Avenue.

== History ==
SR 510 began as an unsigned county-maintained road that ran from the Saint Clair Lake area to the Northern Pacific Railway station at Yelm, constructed by 1916. The road later extended west to Tumwater and designated Secondary State Highway 5I (SSH 5I) in 1937. The old route followed present-day Yelm Highway on the southern side of Saint Clair Lake and Patterson Lake to Tumwater. In 1959, SSH 5I was moved to a northern route to the U.S. Route 99 (US 99) and US 410 freeway in Lacey. SR 510 officially replaced SSH 5I after the 1964 highway renumbering; US 99 and US 410 also became Interstate 5 (I-5) in 1968.

SR 510 between I-5 and Pacific Avenue was reconstructed and widened in late 2003, with the addition of a roundabout at the Pacific Avenue intersection. The I-5 interchange was replaced by a diverging diamond interchange that began construction in October 2018 and opened in August 2020. The interchange was the first diverging diamond constructed in Washington and is estimated to cost $72 million, with funding provided by the state legislature's 2015 Connecting Washington package.

== Alternate route ==
State Route 510 Alternate
- Location: Yelm
- Length: 1.17 mi (1.88 km)
- Existed: 2010–present

State Route 510 Alternate, also known as the Yelm Loop, is a partially completed bypass of Yelm. The first, 1.17-mile (1.88 km) section opened to traffic in October 2010 and cost $4.3 million to construct. The 120-foot (36.58 m) wide, two-lane highway begins at a roundabout with SR 510 near the current Mudd Run Road intersection and travels east through a residential and industrial area, ending at Cullins Road. The bypass was designed in the 1990s in response to increasing traffic congestion and was funded by the Washington State Legislature in 2009.

The second phase of the Yelm Loop project, which would finish the loop and extend it to SR 507, remained unfunded after the completion of the first phase. The state legislature's 2015 "Connecting Washington" transportation package will fund the $67 million second phase beginning in 2019. Supplemental Environmental Assessment was completed in 2021, and the project is scheduled for construction beginning in summer 2026, with completion estimated fall 2029.

== Major intersections ==
The entire highway is in Thurston County.

Location	mi	km	Destinations	Notes
Lacey	0.00	0.00	I-5 – Seattle, Tacoma, Olympia	
	10.94	17.61	SR 510 Alt. east	
Yelm	13.10	21.08	SR 507 (First Street) – Spanaway, Centralia	
1.000 mi = 1.609 km; 1.000 km = 0.621 mi
