= Stacy Kemp =

Stacy Kemp (born October 3, 1979) is an American personal injury attorney, entrepreneur, and film producer. She is the founder and managing attorney of Kemp Law Group.

== Early life and education ==
Stacy Kemp attended River Ridge High School and attended Saint Leo University, majoring in Criminal Justice and earning multiple appearances on the National Dean’s List. She later earned her Juris Doctor degree from Stetson University College of Law, where she received the William F. Blews Award for outstanding pro bono service and several Dean's list recognitions.

== Career ==
Kemp began her professional career as a personal injury attorney, establishing Kemp Law Group, a firm that represents individuals injured in accidents and negligence cases across Florida.

Kemp Law Group was named “Small Business of the Year” by the West Pasco Chamber of Commerce. The firm was also included in the Inc. 5000 ranking of the fastest-growing privately held companies in the United States for the second consecutive year.

== Film Production ==
Beyond her legal career, Kemp has ventured into film production, serving as a producer on several independent film projects. Kemp co-founded Ferrari Films with producer Bastiano Ferrari.

== Philanthropy ==
Kemp has been involved in community service in the Tampa Bay area of Florida. Kemp Law Group is a presenting sponsor of the Chasco Fiesta, a nine-day festival that supports more than 25 nonprofit organizations.
