= RRHS =

RRHS may refer to:

- Ronald Wilson Reagan College Preparatory High School, Milwaukee, Wisconsin, United States
- Red River High School, Grand Forks, North Dakota, United States
- Rio Rancho High School, Rio Rancho, New Mexico, United States
- Rio Rico High School, Rio Rico, Arizona, United States
- River Ridge High School (disambiguation)
- Roanoke Rapids High School, Roanoke Rapids, North Carolina, United States
- Rocky River High School (North Carolina), Mint Hill, North Carolina, United States
- Rocky River High School (Ohio), Rocky River, Ohio, United States
- Round Rock High School, Round Rock, Texas, United States
