= Nisqually Reservation =

Nisqually Reservation, Washington
- CDP
- Location of Nisqually Reservation, Washington
- Coordinates: 47°0′22″N 122°40′11″W
- Country: United States
- State: Washington
- County: Thurston

Area
  - Total: 2.7 sq mi (7.1 km^{2})
  - Land: 2.7 sq mi (7.0 km^{2})
  - Water: 0 sq mi (0.0 km^{2})

Population (2020)
  - Total: 668
  - Density: 217/sq mi (83.6/km^{2})
- Time zone: UTC-8 (Pacific (PST))
  - Summer (DST): UTC-7 (PDT)
- ZIP code: 98513
- Area codes: 360, 564
- FIPS code: 53-49193
- GNIS feature ID: 1528422

The Nisqually Reservation, also known as Nisqually Indian Reservation is a federally recognized Indian reservation of the Nisqually tribe in Thurston County, Washington, United States. The population was 668 at the 2020 census.

== History ==
Nisqually Indian Reservation was formed in 1854 after the signing of the Treaty of Medicine Creek. The portion northeast of the Nisqually River, totaling 3,353 acres (1,357 ha), was condemned in 1918 by Pierce County for use by the U.S. Army during the establishment of Fort Lewis. The Nisqually Tribe was compensated $75,840 by an Indian Board; an additional $65,000 was appropriated by the federal government in 1921 to landowners in recognition of the "unfair payment".

== Geography ==
The Nisqually Reservation is located at 47°0′22″N 122°40′11″W (47.006162, -122.669733).

According to the United States Census Bureau, the Nisqually Indian Community CDP (census-designated place, as the reservation is title for census purposes, has a total area of 2.7 square miles (7.1 km^{2}), of which, 2.7 square miles (7.0 km^{2}) of it is land and 0.37% is water.

== Demographics ==
Historical population
Census	Pop.	Note	%±
1990	558		—
2000	588		5.4%
2010	575		−2.2%
2020	668		16.2%
U.S. Decennial Census; 2020 Census

As of the census of 2000, there were 588 people, 173 households, and 149 families residing in the CDP. The population density was 216.5 people per square mile (83.5/km^{2}). There were 178 housing units at an average density of 65.5/sq mi (25.3/km^{2}). The racial makeup of the CDP was 26.70% White, 1.36% African American, 60.71% Native American, 0.68% Asian, 1.36% Pacific Islander, 0.85% from other races, and 8.33% from two or more races. Hispanic or Latino of any race were 5.61% of the population.

There were 173 households, out of which 45.1% had children under the age of 18 living with them, 50.3% were married couples living together, 23.7% had a female householder with no husband present, and 13.3% were non-families. 9.2% of all households were made up of individuals, and 2.3% had someone living alone who was 65 years of age or older. The average household size was 3.40 and the average family size was 3.50.

In the CDP, the age distribution of the population shows 36.6% under the age of 18, 12.4% from 18 to 24, 25.5% from 25 to 44, 20.6% from 45 to 64, and 4.9% who were 65 years of age or older. The median age was 26 years. For every 100 females, there were 87.3 males. For every 100 females age 18 and over, there were 92.3 males.

The median income for a household in the CDP was $35,000, and the median income for a family was $38,750. Males had a median income of $34,250 versus $25,096 for females. The per capita income for the CDP was $14,094. About 13.7% of families and 18.2% of the population were below the poverty line, including 18.4% of those under age 18 and 26.1% of those age 65 or over.

== Education ==
The census-designated place is divided between North Thurston Public Schools and Yelm Community Schools.

== See also ==
- Nisqually tribe
