= River Ridge =

River Ridge may refer to:

- River Ridge, Monroe County, Alabama
- River Ridge, Pike County, Alabama
- River Ridge, Florida, USA
- River Ridge, Indiana, USA – Two parts of the former Indiana Army Ammunition Plant:
  - A defunct residential area on the grounds of Indiana Ordnance Works Plant 1, part of the overall complex; that area is now part of Charlestown State Park
  - An industrial park that occupies much of the former Plant 1 site
- River Ridge, Louisiana, a suburb of New Orleans, USA
- Trinity School at River Ridge, a private school in Bloomington, Minnesota, USA
- River Ridge High School (disambiguation), several schools in the USA
- River Ridge (TV series)
