= Tom Dutra =

American soccer player and coach

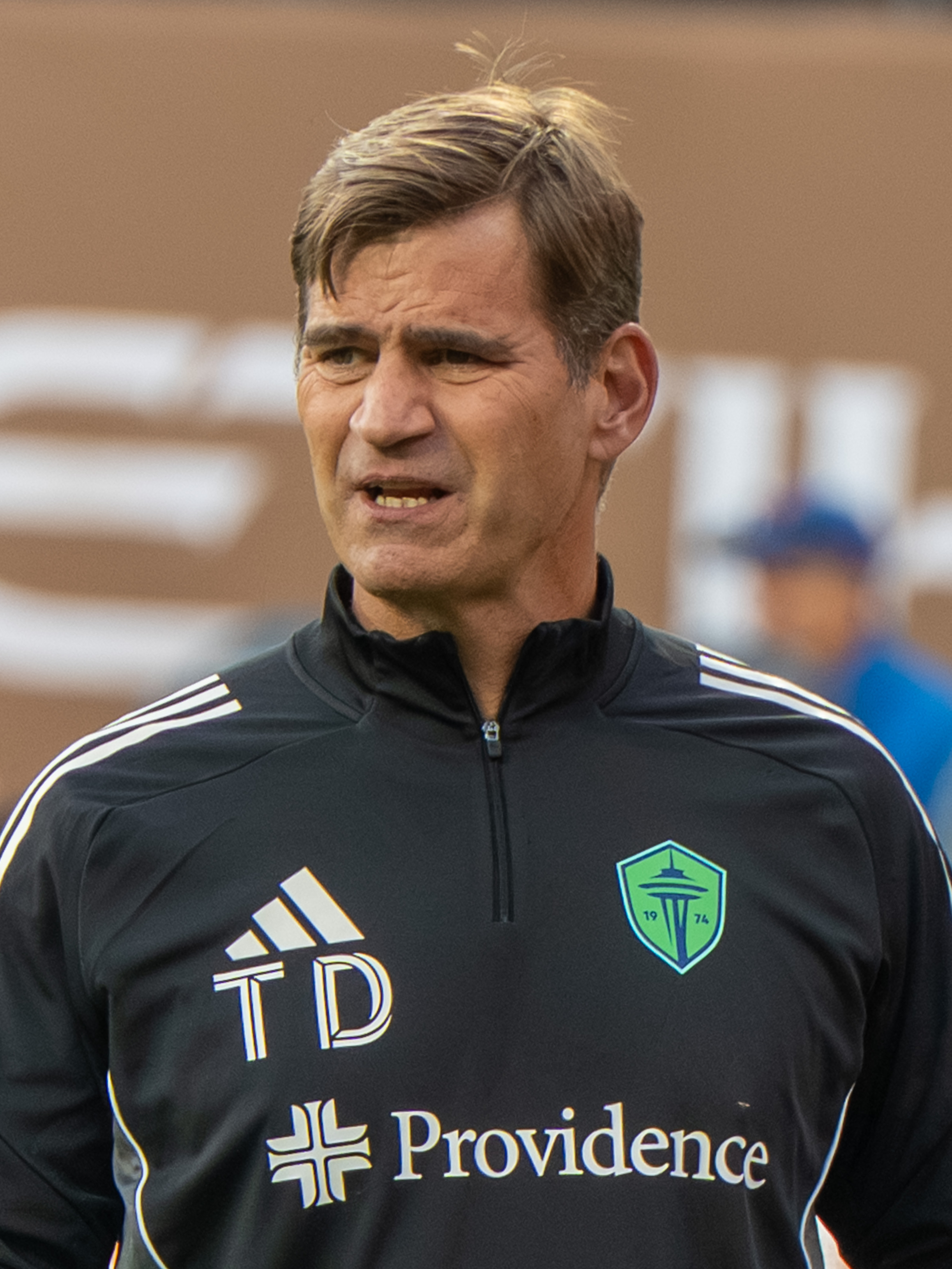
- Dutra with Seattle Sounders FC in 2025

Personal information
- Full name: Thomas Alan Dutra
- Date of birth: September 4, 1972 (age 54)
- Place of birth: Lacey, Washington, U.S.
- Height: 6 ft 1 in (1.85 m)
- Position: Goalkeeper

Team information
- Current team: Seattle Sounders FC (assistant)

Senior career*
Years	Team	Apps	(Gls)
1995	Oregon Surge		
1996	Seattle Sounders	3	(0)
1997–1998	New Orleans Riverboat Gamblers		
1999	Lehigh Valley Steam		

Managerial career
- 2002–2006: Pacific Lutheran University (assistant)
- 2007–2008: St. Martin's University (assistant)
- 2006–2008: Seattle Sounders (assistant)
- 2009–: Seattle Sounders FC (assistant)
- * Club domestic league appearances and goals

Thomas Alan Dutra (born September 4, 1972) is an American retired soccer goalkeeper. Since 2009, he has been the goalkeeper coach for Seattle Sounders FC of Major League Soccer; Dutra was previously an assistant for the pre-MLS Sounders from 2006 to 2008.

== Player ==
=== Youth ===
Dutra graduated from Timberline High School in 1991.

=== Professional ===
In 1992, Dutra played in Mexico and in 1994, he played in Germany. In 1995, Dutra played for the Oregon Surge of the USISL. He also spent time in the Netherlands and Germany. In April 1996, he signed with the Seattle Sounders of the USISL A-League. Dutra backed up starter Marcus Hahnemann. In March 1997, Dutra moved to the New Orleans Riverboat Gamblers. He broke his ankle in the first half of the second game of the season, missing the rest of the season. He came back in 1998 only to break a rib during an early season game. In 1999, he moved to the Lehigh Valley Steam.

== Coach ==
In 2006, Dutra became the goalkeeper coach for the Seattle Sounders of the USL First Division. On December 28, 2008, the expansion Seattle Sounders FC of Major League Soccer announced they had hired Dutra as the team's goalkeeper coach.
