= North Thurston High School =

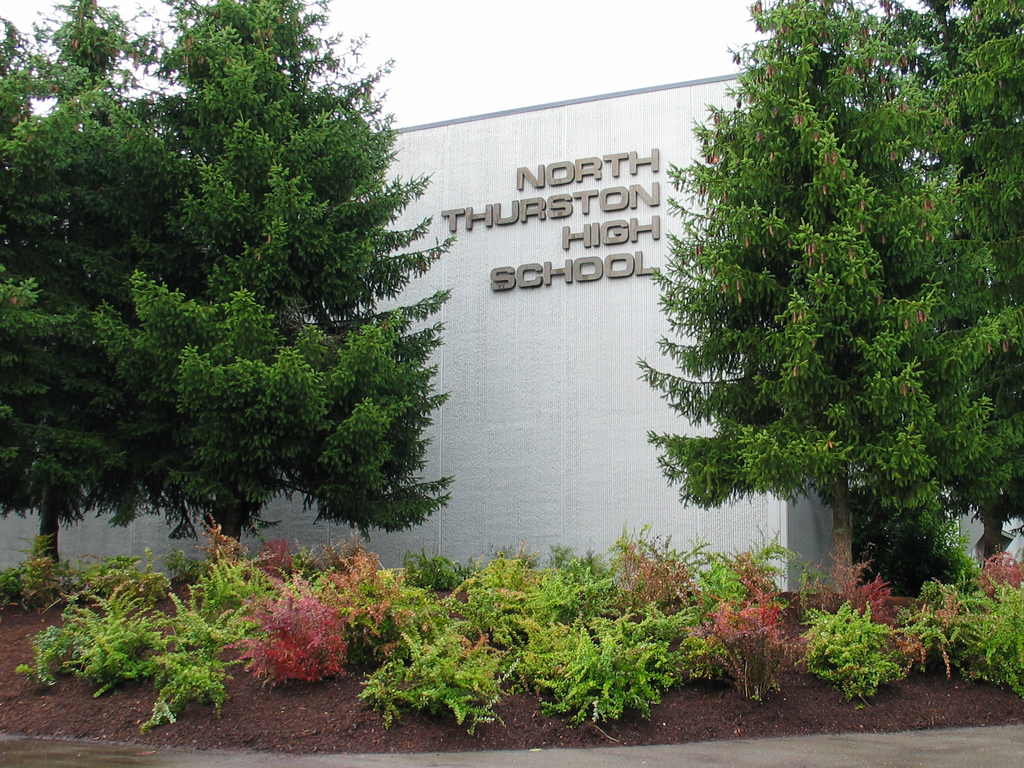

Location
- 600 Sleater Kinney Rd NE; Lacey, Washington 98506; United States; 47°03′07″N 122°49′55″W

Information
- Type: Public secondary
- Motto: Committed to Excellence: Providing every student the academic and life skills necessary to succeed in a diverse world.
- Established: 1955
- Principal: Nick Greenwell
- Faculty: 64.20 (FTE)
- Grades: 9-12
- Enrollment: 1,378 (2024-2025)
- Student to teacher ratio: 21.46
- Colors: Purple & White
- Mascot: Rams
- Newspaper: Rampage
- Yearbook: Rambler
- Website: norththurston.ntps.org

North Thurston High School (NTHS), located in the North Thurston Public Schools District in Lacey, Washington, United States, is a comprehensive high school which opened in 1955. North Thurston serves a portion of Lacey and northeast Thurston County. The school is accredited by the Washington State Superintendent of Public Instruction. The principal is Jake Tyrrell.

== History ==
The current North Thurston High School campus was constructed in 1983; South Sound Stadium was added in 1985 and the Auditorium was added in 1995. NTHS' central building easily hit capacity within the first few years after being constructed. A flood of portables were brought in during the mid 80's to handle the student enrollment growth along with the 1993 construction of River Ridge High School. Several portables are still in use to handle the over-capacity demand on the NTHS campus.

The original North Thurston High School campus was on what is now the student parking lot. This campus was constructed in 1954 and torn down in 1984. The old campus hosted Chinook Middle School students during the 1983-1984 year while Chinook's building went through a building remodel. Three original building from the old NTHS campus; NTPS' Bower Learning Center (the old high school library), the auto shop, and the school swimming pool were part of the old high school campus and are still in use. The pool and Bower Learning Center were remodeled in 2003.

As of 2011, a re-modernization project to remodel the 27-year-old North Thurston High School building is under development by North Thurston Public Schools and awaits funding. The project would take place in various yearly stages with students on campus. Some ideas being considered are a new gymnasium with expanded capacity, expansion of the current commons area into the current gymnasium, increased parking, additional building expansion to replace 27 portables, and modernization and safety upgrades of current classroom, hallway, and unused spaces.

On April 27, 2015, a 16-year-old male student at the school fired twice in the crowded high school commons before a teacher, who was a military veteran, grabbed him. The Lacey police officer on duty at the school had not been able to fire because students were in his line of fire and the teacher reached the shooter before the officer thought he could get a clear shot at the shooter. The shooter said he never wanted to hurt any students, but fired his gun only to get the school resource officer to kill him.

== Notable alumni ==
- Gary Wright, class of '64, anti-Vietnam War protester who emigrated to Canada and became mayor of New Denver, British Columbia
- Darcy Fast, class of '65, Former MLB player (Chicago Cubs)
- Gabriel Gudding, class of '84, poet and essayist, translator
- Kasey Keller, class of '88, US National Soccer team goalkeeper in 1990, 1998, 2002 and 2006 World Cup tournaments, former Goalie for Seattle Sounders FC. A street near North Thurston is named after him.
- Jason Dunn, class of '90, former professional soccer player with 3 caps for the USMNT
- Michael Sellers, class of '93, a retired NFL Pro-bowler (2008), formerly with the Washington Redskins
- Brian Kendrick, class of '97, Professional wrestler

== Sports ==
North Thurston High School is a 3A-division member of the Washington Interscholastic Activities Association. It is a member of the Narrows League, which includes a combination of 4A and 3A schools.

State Championships
Season	Sport	Number of Championships	Year
Spring	Soccer, Boys	1	1990
Winter	Cheerleading	1	2011
Spring	Baseball	1	2002
Spring	Total		3

State Championships, 2nd place:

Baseball - 1976, 1987; Boys Soccer - 1985; Girls Swimming - 1984; Boys Tennis - 1987; Boys Track and Field - 1987; Girls Track and Field - 1994; Volleyball - 2012

== See also ==
- River Ridge High School
- Timberline High School
