= Jerramy Stevens =

American football player (born 1979)

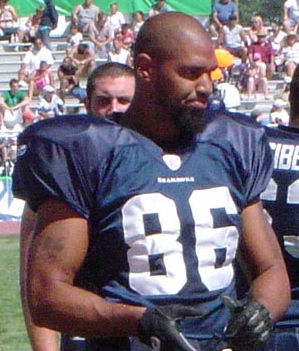
- Stevens at the 2005 Seahawks intrasquad scrimmage

No. 86
- Position: Tight end

Personal information
- Born: November 13, 1979 (age 46); Boise, Idaho, U.S.
- Listed height: 6 ft 7 in (2.01 m)
- Listed weight: 260 lb (118 kg)

Career information
- High school: River Ridge (Lacey, Washington)
- College: Washington (1998–2001)
- NFL draft: 2002: 1st round, 28th overall pick

Career history
- Seattle Seahawks (2002–2006); Tampa Bay Buccaneers (2007–2010)

Awards and highlights
- Second-team All-Pac-10 (2000)

Career NFL statistics
- Receptions: 202
- Receiving yards: 2,217
- Receiving touchdowns: 22
- Stats at Pro Football Reference

Jerramy Ryan Stevens (born November 13, 1979) is an American former professional football player who was a tight end in the National Football League (NFL).

He played college football for the Washington Huskies and was selected by the Seattle Seahawks in the first round of the 2002 NFL draft. Stevens also played for the Tampa Bay Buccaneers.

With Washington, Stevens was among the team's top receivers in the 1999 and 2000 seasons and won the 2001 Rose Bowl with Washington following an 11–1 season in 2000. In 2005, Stevens became a regular starter at tight end for the Seattle Seahawks and played in Super Bowl XL.

== Early life ==
Jerramy Stevens attended River Ridge High School of Lacey, Washington. A 1998 graduate, Stevens was a letterman in football, basketball, and track. In football, Stevens originally played quarterback. He passed for 5,000 yards during his high school career, including throwing for 2,000 yards as a junior. As a senior, he earned first-team All-Narrows League and was named to The Olympian's All-Area team as a safety.

During his senior year, he and another student were accused of beating a schoolmate over his head with a baseball bat and stomping on his face on June 2, 1998. The victim suffered a broken jaw and ate with a straw for six months. Upon questioning by authorities, Stevens initially denied being involved in the fight but admitted his wrongdoing later. Stevens was charged with felony assault and was ordered to home detention while awaiting trial. Because he tested positive for cannabis during home detention, Stevens spent three weeks in Thurston County jail. Three football coaches at the University of Washington wrote the trial judge affirming that Stevens's scholarship offer was still valid, and the judge allowed Stevens to participate in training camp with Washington even though Stevens violated home detention orders. As a result of a plea deal, Stevens was convicted of misdemeanor assault and received credit for time served.

== College career ==
Stevens redshirted the 1998 season and played on the practice squad as quarterback. For his redshirt freshman season in 1999, Stevens converted to tight end. In 1999, Stevens made 21 receptions for 265 yards and 4 touchdowns.

In 2000, Stevens made 43 receptions for 600 yards and 3 touchdowns and won the 2001 Rose Bowl with Washington. On September 9, in Washington's 34–29 upset over fourth-ranked Miami (Florida), Stevens made 7 receptions for 89 yards, including a 23-yard touchdown pass from Marques Tuiasosopo in a drive that put Washington up 21–3 at the half. The following game on September 16 against Colorado, Stevens made 7 receptions again but this time for 103 yards. In the Rose Bowl game, Stevens led Washington in receiving with 5 catches for 51 yards.

In 2001, Stevens made 10 receptions for 88 yards and one touchdown. Stevens injured his right foot on September 24 and was sidelined until November.

== Professional career ==
=== NFL draft ===
Pre-draft measurables
Height	Weight	Arm length	Hand span	40-yard dash
6 ft 6 3/4 in (2.00 m)	265 lb (120 kg)	33 in (0.84 m)	8 1/2 in (0.22 m)	4.77 s
All values from NFL Scouting Combine

Stevens was selected by his hometown Seattle Seahawks as their first-round pick in the 2002 NFL draft; he was the 28th player taken overall. Seattle traded its first-round (No. 20) and fifth-round (No. 156) choices to Green Bay for the Packers' first-round (No. 28) and second-round (No. 60) choices. Green Bay used the picks to select Javon Walker and Aaron Kampman.

Because of Stevens's criminal history, Stevens's draft selection by the Seahawks was controversial to the fans. Head coach Mike Holmgren acknowledged that drafting Stevens took him numerous deliberations with Stevens, Stevens's parents, Stevens's coaches at Washington, and even Holmgren's own family.

=== Seattle Seahawks ===
Stevens played 12 games with one start in his rookie season in 2002 and debuted in the season opener against the Oakland Raiders on September 8. Forced by Raiders cornerback Charles Woodson, Stevens fumbled his first reception, a four-yard pass from Matt Hasselbeck but made two other receptions that game. On November 24, in a 39–32 win over the Kansas City Chiefs, Stevens made his first touchdown catch as a professional. The 6-yard touchdown pass from Hasselbeck marked a turning point in the game as Seattle took a 21–17 lead on that touchdown drive and never looked back. As a rookie, Stevens made 21 receptions for 252 yards and 3 touchdowns.

In 2003, Stevens played all 16 games and started 2, with 6 receptions for 72 yards.

In 2004, Stevens again played all 16 games and started 5. He made 31 receptions for 349 yards and 3 touchdowns.

In 2005, Stevens started 12 games out of 16 and made 45 receptions for 554 yards and 5 touchdowns.

Before Super Bowl XL, Stevens said in a February 2, 2006 interview, "The story of Jerome Bettis returning to his hometown (Detroit) is heartwarming, but it's going be a sad day when he doesn't walk away with that trophy." This drew the ire of Pittsburgh Steelers linebacker Joey Porter. On February 5, 2006, Stevens caught 3 passes for 25 yards in Super Bowl XL. Among his catches was Seattle's first-ever Super Bowl touchdown. However, he also dropped three key passes in the Seahawks' 21–10 loss to the Steelers.

On November 6, 2006, in a game against the Oakland Raiders, Stevens was kneed in the groin by Raiders defensive end Tyler Brayton, who was then ejected from the game. Neither player was suspended, but Brayton was fined $25,000 by the NFL for the incident, and Stevens was fined $15,000 for his involvement, as well as an earlier taunting incident.

Art Shell, the Raiders coach, said in an interview that Stevens was the instigator, and had tried to knee Brayton earlier. However Mike Holmgren, the Seahawks coach, responded by saying that Stevens was not attempting to strike Brayton, but was struggling for leverage which caused his leg to flare out.

On March 20, 2007, Seattle general manager Tim Ruskell confirmed that Stevens' days with the Seahawks were done. "I would say it's probably a time for a change of scenery and to move on," Ruskell said. This move was widely expected, as only hours after Stevens' arrest on March 13, the Seahawks signed veteran Marcus Pollard, giving them four tight ends.

=== Tampa Bay Buccaneers ===
On April 29, 2007, he signed with the Tampa Bay Buccaneers. He caught his first touchdown pass as a Buccaneer on December 2 (Week 13) against the New Orleans Saints, a four-yard reception from Luke McCown with 14 seconds left in the game in a drive that clinched a 27–23 victory for the Buccaneers and the team's fourth straight win. However, the NFL suspended Stevens for one game without pay on December 11 for a violation of league substance abuse policy.

On May 30, 2008, Stevens was re-signed by the Buccaneers after the team waived quarterback Bruce Gradkowski. On June 4, 2008, Stevens was suspended for two games and fined three game checks after violating the NFL's substance abuse policy. In 14 games played, Stevens made three starts and made 36 receptions for 397 yards and 2 touchdowns.

In 2009, Stevens played all 16 regular season games with eight starts for the Buccaneers. Stevens made 15 receptions for 130 yards and a touchdown.

The Buccaneers waived Stevens on October 25, 2010, two days after Stevens was arrested for possessing marijuana. Stevens played in five games with one start in 2010 for Tampa and made three receptions for 43 yards.

=== NFL statistics ===
Year	Team	G	Rec	Tgt	Yds	Avg	Long	TD	1st	Fmb	Fmb lost
2002	SEA	12	26	-	252	9.7	29	3	14	1	0
2003	SEA	16	6	-	72	12.0	26	0	3	0	0
2004	SEA	16	31	-	349	11.3	32	3	19	0	0
2005	SEA	16	45	-	554	12.3	35	5	31	0	0
2006	SEA	11	22	48	231	10.5	26	4	12	1	1
2007	TB	15	18	21	189	10.5	24	4	11	0	0
2008	TB	14	36	59	397	11.0	31	2	16	0	0
2009	TB	16	15	32	130	8.7	17	1	6	0	0
2010	TB	5	3	5	43	14.3	22	0	2	0	0
Career		121	202	165	2,217	11.0	35	22	114	2	1

== Personal life ==
Stevens was born in Boise, Idaho, to a black father and a white mother, one of four children. His mother Fran worked as a police officer and school administrator, and his father Bob was a teacher and high school sports coach. Bob Stevens died on September 4, 2012, at age 62, from cancer. Stevens grew up in Lacey, Washington.

Stevens married Hope Solo, a professional soccer goalkeeper formerly on the United States women's national soccer team, on November 13, 2012; the two had been dating for about two months, and the marriage came one day after Stevens was arrested for allegedly assaulting Solo. Solo attended the University of Washington from 1999 to 2003, nearly the same time as Stevens, and played for four seasons on the Washington Huskies women's soccer team. The couple welcomed Vittorio Genghis and Lozen Orianna Judith Stevens on March 4, 2020.

== Criminal allegations ==
=== Violent crime ===
- In spring 1998, Stevens—a high school senior—was charged with felony assault, which led to three weeks in the Thurston County jail after testing positive for marijuana, which violated the terms of his home confinement. "The felony charge appeared to place his [University of Washington football] scholarship in jeopardy—but three UW coaches wrote the judge, saying the UW's offer was still good."
- In July 2000, Stevens was arrested and charged with rape. UW athletic director Barbara Hedges told news media that UW would investigate sexual battery charges; but the university did not. King County Prosecutor Norm Maleng's office "agreed to give crucial police evidence—the victim and witness statements—to Stevens's lawyers before the interview." This was directly contrary to standard police procedure, and the Seattle Police did not agree to release those statements, so an interview was never done. Despite DNA evidence, Maleng's office declined to prosecute.
- On March 3, 2011, Stevens was arrested and charged with felony battery for punching two bouncers in a Tampa, Florida bar. According to his attorney, who denied the charges, after Stevens was released from jail, he was treated for "multiple broken ribs and extensive bruising to his body and face."
- On November 12, 2012, Stevens was arrested on investigation of assault following an altercation that left his fiancée, soccer star Hope Solo, injured, but a Kirkland, Washington judge dropped the case the following day for lack of evidence. The pair were wed November 13, 2012, the day after the arrest.

=== Traffic violations ===
- On October 19, 2000, Stevens sideswiped Donald Preston's Dodge Daytona on I-5 after "driving like a maniac" and "using the HOV lane as a passing lane." He fled the scene without giving any information to Preston. The State Trooper who tracked him via the license plate on his red truck did not charge him with hit-and-run but instead cited him for "driving too fast for conditions."
- On May 4, 2001, Stevens was cited for reckless driving and hit and run after crashing his pickup truck into a retirement home. The crash knocked a dresser onto a bed where a 92-year-old woman was sleeping. Stevens first lied, saying he did not know who was driving his truck; he later pleaded guilty to hit-and-run and causing property damage and was given a suspended 90-day jail sentence, 240 hours of community service, and probation.
- In 2002, after signing with the Seattle Seahawks, Stevens was ticketed for going 98 mph in his new Range Rover. Three months later, he was cited for negligent driving and paid a $490 fine.
- On April 3, 2003, Stevens was stopped by Medina, Washington police and was charged with reckless driving and driving while intoxicated. He pleaded guilty to reckless driving. For violating probation from the May 2001 incident, Stevens served five days in jail effective June 12, 2003 and was ordered to do 40 hours of community service. For the reckless driving charge, Stevens was sentenced to two days in jail, 25 hours of community service, and a $1,000 fine on June 23. The sentencing judge compared Stevens to Reggie Rogers, another star University of Washington football player who was convicted of DUI.
- On March 13, 2007, eleven days after he became a free agent, Stevens was arrested in Scottsdale, Arizona for suspicion of DUI after his blood alcohol content was measured at 0.204, more than twice the legal limit of .08 and considered "extreme DUI" in Arizona. On September 7, a jury found Stevens guilty. Although the crime carries a mandatory minimum of 30 days in jail, the judge gave Stevens 12 days, "suspending the other 18 because he was enrolled in the NFL's substance-abuse program, the same program Stevens entered in 2003, after being stopped with two open champagne bottles in his car." The NFL suspended him for one game.
- On January 19, 2015, Stevens, then 35, was arrested in Manhattan Beach, California for suspicion of DUI. As a result of this incident, Steven's wife Hope Solo was suspended for thirty days from the U.S. Soccer team for showing poor judgement in entering the car and arguing with the police. In May, Stevens was sentenced to 30 days in jail and four years' probation for driving a U.S. soccer team van while drunk. The judge also mandated a two-year outpatient alcohol program. Stevens had refused a blood or breathalyzer test; officers had to obtain a search warrant to draw a blood sample; his blood-alcohol concentration was at least 0.15%.

=== Other issues ===
- On March 16, 2007, The Seattle Times reported that multiple complaints were raised against Stevens by other residents in his condominium complex. The complaints included vomit on their doors, used condoms on the back porch, loud parties at all hours of the night, and various noise complaints.
- On October 23, 2010, Stevens was arrested and charged in Tampa with possession of marijuana. Stevens had been pulled over for playing loud music, when the officer smelled marijuana, and discovered 38 grams of it in his car. Stevens was sentenced to probation until October 2013 for the incident but returned to Hillsborough County, Florida jail on November 28, 2012, for violating probation.
