= South Sound Center =

Shopping mall in Lacey, Washington, US

- Location: Lacey, Washington
- Coordinates: 47°02′35″N 122°50′12″W
- Opened: 1966
- Closed: 2000 (enclosed mall)
- Num. of stores: 2
- Num. of anchor tenants: 3
- Floor area: 500,000 sq ft (46,000 m^{2})
- Floors: 1

South Sound Center is a shopping mall located in Lacey, Washington, United States. It opened in 1966 as the first shopping center in the Olympia area and originally had a 500,000-square-foot (46,000 m^{2}) enclosed mall. The indoor sections were demolished in 2000 and replaced by a retail plaza anchored by Target and Kohl's.

== History ==
South Sound Center opened in 1966 and was billed as the fourth regional shopping center in the state of Washington. Anchors at one time included Nordstrom Place Two (closed in 1994), Peoples (1966–1983, opening as Mervyns in 1984), Sears (closed in 2020), Pay 'n Save (closed in 1992) and Woolworth (closed in 1997 as the last store of the chain in Washington State). From the 1960s until the mid-1970s, a Safeway grocery store was in an outlot of the mall; the building has since been demolished. A Joann Fabrics was also built behind the mall; it later became an office building.

For a time in the 1980s to the early 1990s, the center hosted a "Christmas Island" display during the holiday season at the back of the parking lot. It also hosted an annual fireworks display on July 3 for 45 years before it moved in 2012. After several stores in the mall moved out or were closed, the enclosed mall portion was torn down in 2000 and replaced by a Target store between Sears and Mervyns. In December 2006, Mervyn's closed and was reopened as Kohl's in early 2007.

Around the mall's main building, which is occupied by Target and Kohl's, are a Michaels, Marshalls, and a PetSmart. In 2017, Verizon Wireless's store in the mall was crushed by snow and was closed until further notice, later relocating across the street in 2019. On November 7, 2019, it was announced that Sears was closing the Lacey location; the closure was one of 96 stores to shutter nationwide. The store closed in February 2020. The Sears store opened in 1943 and moved to the mall in 1966. After its closure, it was used seasonally by Halloween stores until purchased by J&I Power Equipment in 2025. The outdoor power and farm equipment retailer relocated into the 80,000-square-foot (7,400 m^{2}) space of the former Sears in 2026.

== Public art ==
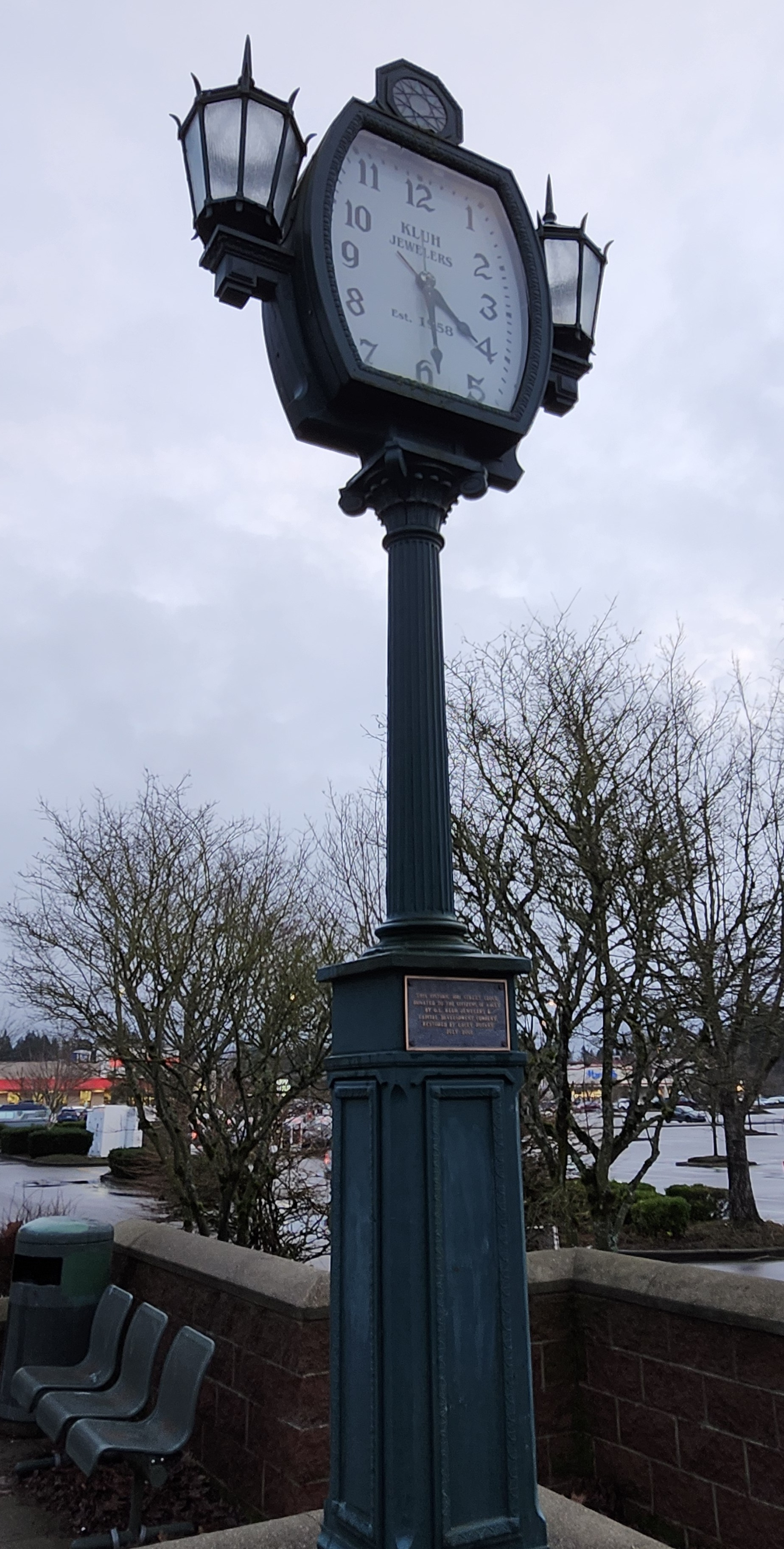
Kluh Clock, 2026

The historic Kluh Clock, donated to the city in 2001, is a noted landmark at South Sound Center.

A bronze sculpture known as Kite Boy is located near the mall on Sleater-Kinney Road at the I-5 entrance ramp to the city. The statue, 5 feet 4 inches (163 cm) in height, was not placed at its permanent location until May 2008 after several attempts were undertaken to find a suitable spot for the piece.

In March 2023, the Gold Star Families Memorial Monument located at the Lacey Civic Plaza next to the mall was dedicated. The memorial honors soldiers who died in combat and their Gold Star families. Funding and efforts were volunteer-driven and included the city of Lacey, a local non-profit known as the Gold Star Memorial Foundation, and the Woody Williams Foundation. The 7 foot (2.1 m)-tall, 8 foot (2.4 m)-wide sculpture is made of four, 8 in (20 cm)-thick black granite panels. The tribute features a gold star and inscriptions that are standard on Woody Williams Foundation designed monuments. The memorial also contains four images, including Mount Rainier, and a carved silhouette of a soldier in salute. The base contains 400 memorial bricks. The land for the monument was donated by both the city and the Washington State Department of Transportation.
