= Mike Sellers =

American football player (born 1975)

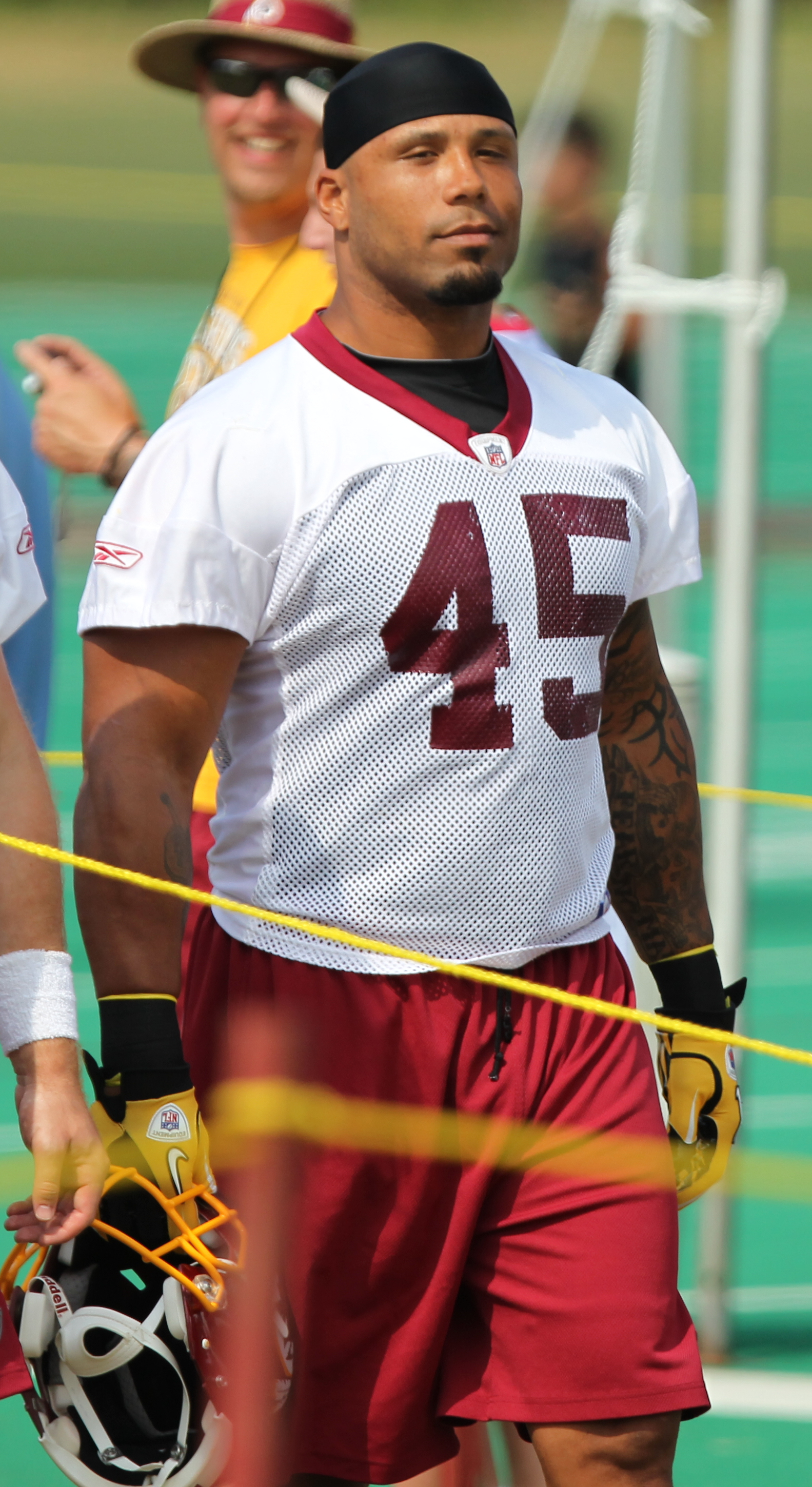
- Sellers with the Washington Redskins in 2011

No. 85, 45, 44
- Position: Fullback

Personal information
- Born: July 21, 1975 (age 51); Frankfurt, West Germany
- Listed height: 6 ft 3 in (1.91 m)
- Listed weight: 273 lb (124 kg)

Career information
- High school: North Thurston (Lacey, Washington, U.S.)
- College: Walla Walla CC (WA)
- NFL draft: 1994: undrafted

Career history
- Edmonton Eskimos (1995–1997); Washington Redskins (1998–2000); Cleveland Browns (2001); Winnipeg Blue Bombers (2002–2003); Washington Redskins (2004–2011)

Awards and highlights
- Pro Bowl (2008)

Career NFL statistics
- Rushing attempts: 50
- Rushing yards: 158
- Rushing touchdowns: 3
- Receptions: 123
- Receiving yards: 1,095
- Receiving touchdowns: 18
- Stats at Pro Football Reference

Michael Sellers (born July 21, 1975) is a former American football fullback in the National Football League (NFL). He was the youngest import player to sign a Canadian Football League (CFL) deal in the history of the football league when he played at 19 years old for the Edmonton Eskimos. He was signed as an undrafted free agent by the NFL's Washington Redskins, and also played for the Cleveland Browns of the NFL.

== High school ==
Sellers attended North Thurston High School in Lacey, Washington and was a letterman in football, basketball and track. As a senior, he was named the Washington Prep Player of the Year and the Offensive Player of the Year.

== Junior college career ==
Sellers attended Walla Walla Community College and earned junior college All-America honors as a linebacker.

== Professional career ==
=== Canadian Football League ===
Sellers attained some stardom in the Canadian Football League, where he moved to fullback and appeared for the Eskimos and the Winnipeg Blue Bombers. With the Blue Bombers, he was the power half of what was then the league's most dangerous rushing duo, "Thunder and Lightning", with fleet-footed running back Charles Roberts.

=== Washington Redskins ===
Sellers signed with the Washington Redskins as an undrafted free agent on January 8, 1998.

=== Cleveland Browns ===
On March 16, 2001, Sellers signed with the Cleveland Browns. He was waived by the Browns on November 27, 2001.

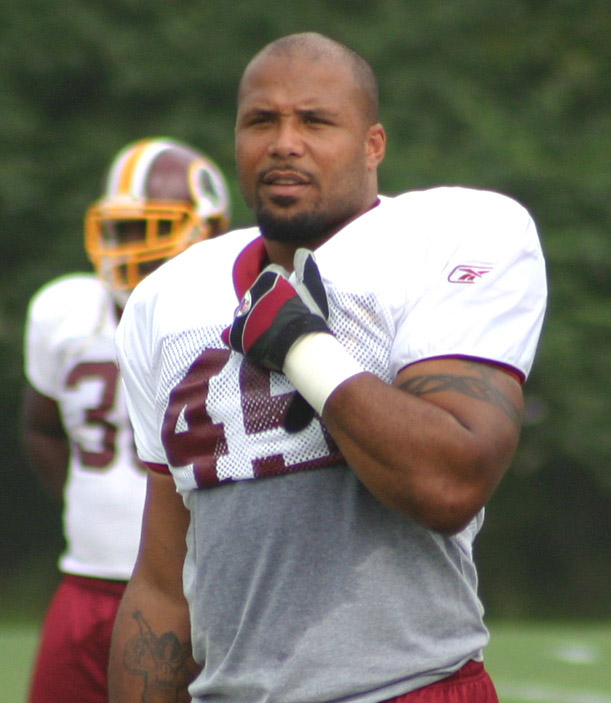
Sellers during Redskins practice in 2005.

=== Return to the Washington Redskins ===
Sellers made his return to the Redskins after signing with them on January 5, 2004.

On March 7, 2005, he re-signed with the Redskins as an unrestricted free agent.

Sellers signed a multi-year contract extension on March 2, 2007.

His stellar performance in the 2008 season allowed Sellers to be selected as the starting fullback for the 2009 Pro Bowl.

On September 16, 2009, the Redskins signed him to a two-year contract extension. Sellers was involved in controversy after a 2009 exhibition game against the New England Patriots. As part of the pregame ceremonies, the last Washington Redskin player announced comes on to the field holding the American flag. This task fell to Sellers who took the flag to midfield before throwing it on the ground. This upset fans in attendance and caused Sellers to issue an apology the next day. He said it was a heat of the moment thing and not meant to be a sign of disrespect.

In the 2011 season, Sellers was made the backup fullback losing the starting spot to Darrel Young. According to Young, Sellers showed no hard feelings and has even acted as a mentor to him. Throughout the season, Sellers played more on special teams along with being a backup fullback, tight end, and H-back.

On March 12, 2012, the Redskins released Sellers. On July 27, Sellers announced that he would be retiring from football.

== Honors ==
In a 1999 article in The News Tribune (Tacoma, Wash.), Sellers was listed as one of the 100 greatest athletes in Washington state history.

In a February 2005 article in The Seattle Times, Sellers was named as one of the 25 greatest running backs in state history.

== Personal ==
Mike Sellers has two daughters, Kaylin and Braxton.

Sellers is a motivational speaker, and spoke to high school football players throughout his career, mostly making an effort to dissuade them from taking steroids in an effort to be better football players.
