= 1999 Los Angeles Jewish Community Center shooting =

Mass shooting in California, U.S.

Los Angeles Jewish Community Center shooting
- Location: 34.2797°N 118.4941°W; First shooting: Granada Hills, Los Angeles, California, United States; Second shooting: Chatsworth, Los Angeles, California, United States
- Date: August 10, 1999; 10:50 a.m. (UTC-7)
- Attack type: Spree shooting, carjacking, hate crime, mass shooting, school shooting
- Weapons: Uzi-type submachine gun; Glock 26 semi-automatic pistol
- Deaths: 1
- Injuries: 5
- Perpetrator: Buford O. Furrow Jr. (Aryan Nations)
- Motive: Antisemitism

On August 10, 1999, at around 10:50 a.m. PT, American white supremacist Buford O. Furrow Jr. walked into the lobby of the North Valley Jewish Community Center in the Granada Hills neighborhood of Los Angeles, California, United States, and opened fire with an Uzi sub machine gun, firing 70 bullets into the complex. The gunfire wounded five people: three children, a teenage counselor, and an office worker. Shortly thereafter, Furrow murdered a mail carrier, fled the state, and finally surrendered to the authorities.

== Perpetrator ==
Buford O'Neal Furrow Jr. (born November 25, 1961) grew up in Lacey, Washington, and graduated from Western Washington University in 1986, with a degree in engineering. During the 1980s, he worked for Boeing and Northrop Grumman and in the 1990s, became involved with white supremacist Richard Girnt Butler's movement, where he was part of the security detail at Butler's Hayden Lake, Idaho, compound. Months prior to the shooting, Furrow had been treated for mental illness while in the custody of the state of Washington.

He had been married to Debbie Mathews (the widow of Robert Jay Mathews, the deceased neo-Nazi terrorist who founded The Order), whom he had met at the Aryan Nations headquarters in Idaho.

== Events ==
On August 7, Furrow bought a used red Chevrolet van in Tacoma, Washington and loaded it with five rifles, two pistols, 6,000 rounds of ammunition and a flak jacket. Furrow considered attacking three Jewish institutions: the Skirball Cultural Center, the American Jewish University and the Simon Wiesenthal Center's Museum of Tolerance, but the presence of armed guards deterred him.

Furrow proceeded to drive again from Washington to the San Fernando Valley with the stated purpose of "killing Jews". Three days later, Furrow pulled off the freeway into the Granada Hills area of Los Angeles and made his way to the North Valley Jewish Community Center just before 11 a.m. There were about 250 children playing outside, when Furrow walked into the lobby carrying an Uzi-type submachine-gun. He opened fire, spraying bullets from right to left, leaving smoke and more than 70 casings on the ground, leaving a receptionist, a camp counselor and three boys wounded.

Furrow fled the scene in his van. Twenty minutes later, he carjacked a woman's Toyota at gunpoint, left the van behind, and then dumped the Toyota at a Chatsworth motel.

The shootings ended with the death of USPS postal worker Joseph Santos Ileto (born March 19, 1960) in Chatsworth, a few miles away from the center. Ileto had just delivered mail to a home and was returning to his postal truck when Furrow asked Ileto to mail a letter for him. As Ileto agreed, Furrow pulled out a Glock 9mm handgun and shot Ileto nine times. Later, he would confess that he murdered Ileto because he thought Ileto was Latino or Asian (Ileto was Filipino American), because Ileto was a federal employee.

Police found Furrow's abandoned van, where they discovered a cache of ammunition, rifle magazines, bulletproof vests, homemade explosives, a Ranger Handbook, and freeze-dried food. Two books by Richard Kelly Hoskins, a Lynchburg, Virginia, leader of the Christian Identity movement were also found; a copy of the book War Cycles, Peace Cycles, and Vigilantes of Christendom: The Story of the Phineas Priesthood, a book which according to the Anti-Defamation League justifies antisemitic and racist acts of violence.

Furrow fled 275-miles in an $800 taxi ride from Los Angeles, California, to Las Vegas, Nevada, ending the manhunt by walking into an FBI office to confess, saying "You're looking for me, I killed the kids in Los Angeles." Furrow also stated that he wanted his shooting to be "a wakeup call to America to kill Jews."

== Victims ==
The injured included a 5-year-old boy, Benjamin Kadish, who was hit in the abdomen and leg, losing 50 percent of his blood; two 6-year-old boys, Joshua Stepakoff, who was hit in the leg and hip; and James Zidell, who was hit in the heel; a 16-year-old girl, Mindy Finkelstein, who was hit in her right thigh and shin; and 68-year-old receptionist Isabelle Shalometh, who was grazed on the arm and back.

Joseph Ileto died of multiple gunshot wounds to the chest and one to the back of the head. He was found dead in a driveway. At Ileto's funeral, messages of condolence from numerous politicians were read by Congressman Brad Sherman.

Of the five people injured in the shooting at the Community Center, all eventually recovered. Benjamin Kadish, the 5-year-old boy, was the most seriously injured victim. Upon arriving at the Providence Holy Cross Medical Center, "He had no blood pressure, no pulse, so that would put you at the most critical condition you could possibly be in," according to the emergency room physician, but Kadish was eventually stabilized after six hours of surgery. Kadish was released from the hospital on September 23, 1999, approximately one month after the shooting.

== Reaction ==
The shooting prompted a national movement, the Million Mom March, which culminated in dozens of marches across the U.S. on Mother's Day 2000, calling for increased gun control. The Southern California Regional Million Mom March, which was held at the birthplace of Los Angeles, Olvera Street, brought more than 10,000 "mothers and others" from five counties together demanding change and protection for children against gun violence. Marches were held in major cities, including the main March in Washington, D.C.

In 2004, on the fifth anniversary of the shootings, families of the victims and local officials called for stricter gun control and hate crime legislation. Ismael Ileto, Joseph's brother, said: "We miss him very much ... and we cannot understand why someone would take the life of my brother. He was just doing his job when he was killed." Ileto was honored by having a post office in Chino Hills, California, named for him.

== Sentencing of Furrow ==
Initially, Furrow pleaded not guilty to a federal charge of murder in killing Ileto and state charges of attempted murder for shooting the five people in the Jewish center, although he reportedly confessed to the shootings in interviews with detectives.

Prosecutors in the case, who said Furrow admitted to his crimes stating they were motivated by racial hatred, promised to seek the death penalty if the case went to trial, which led to a lengthy legal battle with Furrow's defense team. The case was further complicated by defense claims that Furrow suffered from serious psychiatric problems.

On January 24, 2001, Furrow pleaded guilty to all of the 16 felony counts against him (which include a murder charge for the shooting of Ileto, six counts of civil rights violations and nine weapons charges). In exchange for pleading guilty, Furrow avoided a possible death sentence, but instead agreed to be sentenced to life in prison without the possibility of parole. According to the indictment, Furrow expressed no regrets for any of his crimes.

On March 26, 2001, at his sentencing hearing, Furrow was sentenced to two consecutive life terms, plus 110 additional years, without the possibility of parole and was ordered to pay $690,294.11 in restitution to victims' families and insurance companies. United States District Court Judge Nora Manella excoriated Furrow during the proceeding, saying, "Your actions were a stark and brutal reminder that bigotry is alive, if not well."

In 2009, Furrow claimed to have renounced racism and neo-Nazism. He is currently incarcerated in a federal prison in Minnesota.

== See also ==
- Antisemitism in the United States
- Crime in California
- List of attacks on Jewish institutions
- List of mass shootings in the United States (1900–1999)
