= Heritage Hall (Vancouver) =

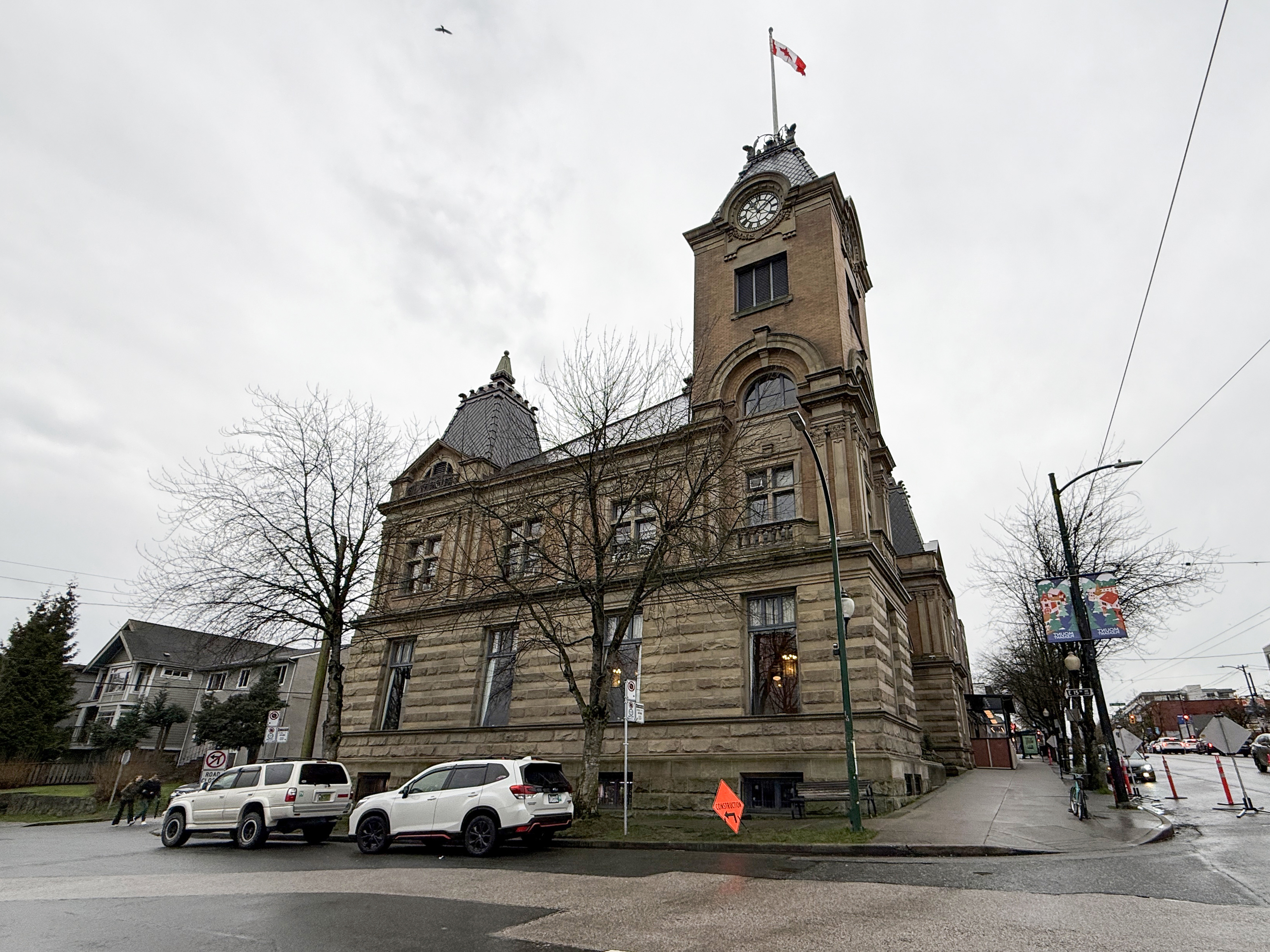
- Heritage Hall in 2026
- Interactive map of the Heritage Hall area

General information
- Location: 3102 Main Street, Vancouver, British Columbia; V5T 3G5
- Coordinates: 49°15′26″N 123°06′03″W
- Completed: 1914

Design and construction
- Architect: Archibald Campbell Hope

The Heritage Hall is an historical building in Vancouver, dating back to 1914 and classified by the City as a designated heritage building. It is located on Main Street, in the Mount Pleasant neighborhood.

The building was designed by architect Archibald Campbell Hope to serve as a post office. Reportedly, the design was derived from a misdirected set of plans that were meant for another city in the Prairies, which got the smaller building meant to have been constructed here. In the 1970s the building was briefly occupied by the Royal Canadian Mounted Police, before being transformed into a community arts venue in the following decade. The Hall stills keeps this function today, besides being used as a venue for weddings and other events.

== Trivia ==
The building served as a shooting location for The X-Files season 3 episode Grotesque after a catholic hospital that served as a stand-in for the George Washington University library declined to have a gargoyle mounted on the roof for a shot.

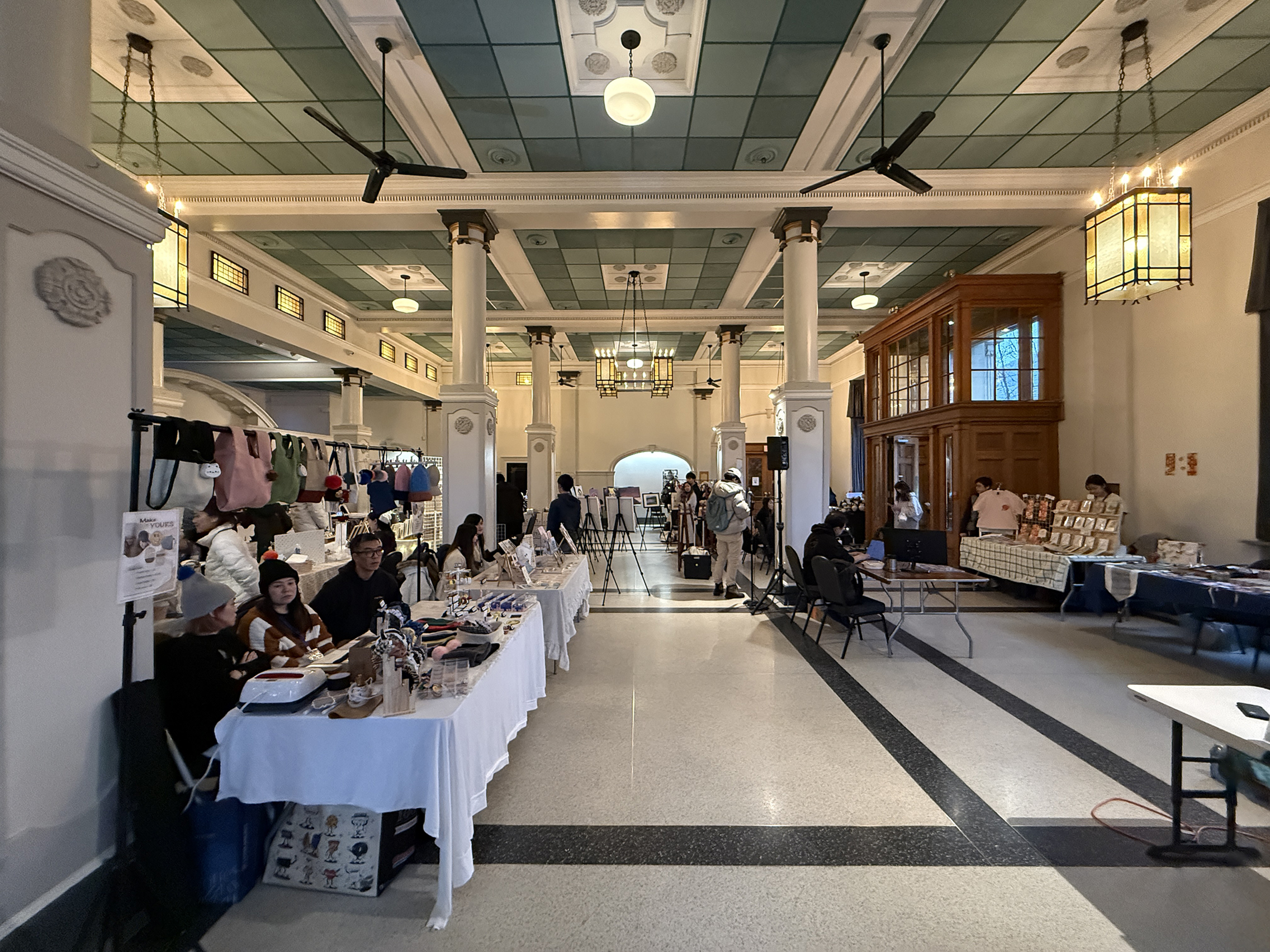
Interior of the hall

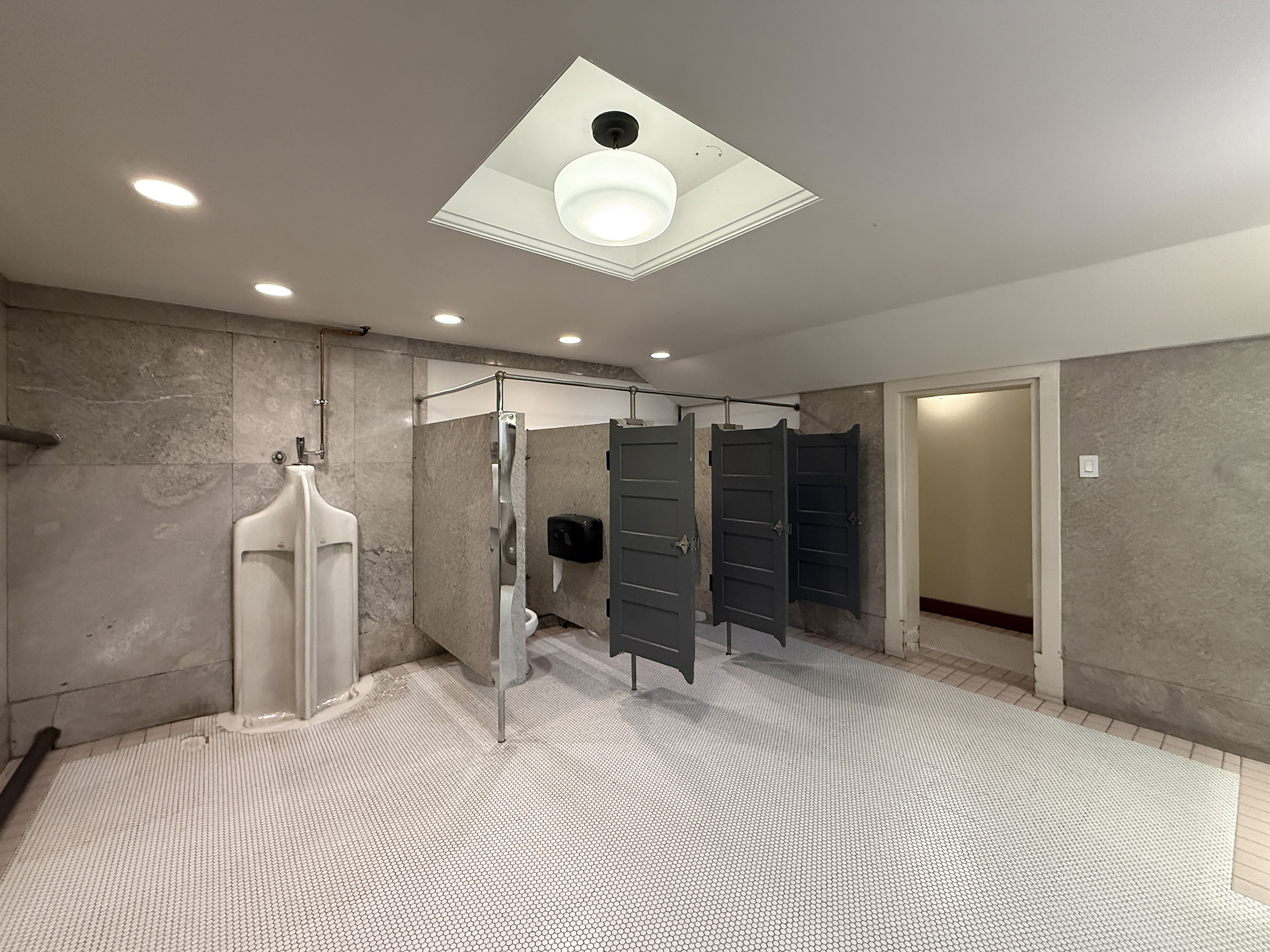
Washroom in basement
