= River Ridge High School (Lacey, Washington) =

Location
- 350 River Ridge Dr. SE; Lacey, Washington 98513; United States; 47.056411°N 122.751431°W

Information
- Type: Public secondary
- Motto: Learning to Live, Living to Learn, Learning to Soar
- Established: 1993
- CEEB code: 480574
- Principal: Brent Whitemarsh
- Teaching staff: 76.80 (FTE)
- Grades: 9–12
- Enrollment: 1,557 (2024-2025)
- Student to teacher ratio: 20.14
- Campus: suburban
- Colors: Navy, Silver & White
- Mascot: Hawks
- Newspaper: The Hawkeye
- Yearbook: Epic (1993-2004); The Raptor (since 2005)
- Feeder schools: Nisqually Middle School; Salish Middle School
- Website: Homepage

River Ridge High School (RRHS), commonly referred to as Ridge, is a public high school located in Lacey, Washington, United States and is one of three comprehensive high schools of the North Thurston Public Schools. It was established in 1993 and named for its proximity to the geographical ridge of the Nisqually River valley. It earned its school nickname due to its location within the Hawk's Prairie area of Thurston County off Exit 111 of Interstate 5, serving students living in Mushroom Corner and Tanglewilde-Thompson Place.

River Ridge and its feeder school, Nisqually Middle School, serves many students with parents who are on active duty or have retired from the military due to its proximity to Joint Base Lewis-McChord. River Ridge was constructed as a community solution to handle the over-flowing capacities of neighboring Timberline and North Thurston High Schools in the late 1980s-early 1990s, producing a more diverse student body population than the other two high schools in the district. It is also currently being renovated.

== History ==
=== Campus ===
Front plaza

River Ridge is a high school established in the Lacey area and was the first in the school district to carry on a unique house system of organizing classrooms, dubbed "school within a school": students were split into the four houses (Kalama(A), Olympic(B), Cascade(C), and Durazno(D)) in which each house has its own office and administrative team. Other buildings served to house electives, athletics, library media center, and main administrative offices. The house system was discontinued in 2011, and house buildings currently group classrooms by academic discipline. There is also another complex near D house called Sommer hall; it currently has STEM (Science, Technology, Engineering, Mathematics) classes.

A common criticism in the school's architectural layout is the use of breezeway to connect the seven buildings, which provides little protection from the Pacific Northwest weather. Renovations began in 2018 to add an auxiliary gymnasium where the junior varsity baseball field had previously been located. Until 2000 the campus shared space with the experimental high school, New Century High School, which relocated as South Sound High School in 2001.

=== Academics ===
Since its start until 2009, River Ridge has had Graduation Project as a required class for its seniors; this was before it became a mandatory statewide requirement in Washington. Wood shop is not offered. In addition, three foreign language classes offered are Spanish, Japanese, and French (in order of enrollment). German was offered in the past. In addition, like most American high schools, many students choose to participate in Advanced Placement (AP) classes, allowing them to earn college credit in Calculus, Physics, Government, and World History among others.

College-bound students have opportunities to earn college credit during their tenure at RRHS. Like many schools in Washington State, River Ridge lets its students to participate in the Running Start program, allowing them to attend college classes while simultaneously satisfying high school graduation requirements. River Ridge Running Start participants attend nearby South Puget Sound Community College in its Tumwater or Hawks Prairie campuses or at Pierce College in Lakewood.

Career-minded students interested in a vocational education are able to attend classes at New Market Vocational Skills Center in Tumwater.

=== Graduation Ceremony ===
Every year River Ridge has a formal graduation ceremony held at the St Martin's Pavilion in Lacey, WA.

== Activities ==
=== Arts ===
River Ridge has two choirs (Concert and Symphonic), two string orchestras, and three band classes (Concert Band, Wind Ensemble, and Jazz Ensemble). Pep Band is run through fall and winter for football and basketball. Since the 2008–09 school year, River Ridge hosts a taiko ensemble through The River Ridge Taiko Project.

The River Ridge Theater Department, produces at least five works a year, including at least one full-length musical. There also is an annual student-produced and directed Student Works production, made solely of student created one act plays and dances. The Educational Theatre Association has named River Ridge an Outstanding School in 2004, the same year that Dr. James Koval and Carolyn Lint, the superintendent and assistant superintendent were awarded that 2004 Administrator's Award.

=== Athletics ===
The River Ridge Hawks compete as a 3A-division member of the South Sound Conference in District 3 as organized by the WIAA. It was formerly aligned with the Narrows League as a 3A school from 1993 to 1999 and the Pac 9 League as a 4A school from 1999 to 2006. The Hawks use a version of East Carolina University's "E.C. Victory" as its fight song; it previously used "Indiana, Our Indiana".

The school's track team, under the lead of coach Phil Lonborg, has been known for winning league championships every year, Boy's District Championships in 2007 and 2009, and has won back to back Girls' State Track and Field Championships in 1994 and 1995. Girls' Basketball and Volleyball have also been very successful from 2003–2007. The baseball team has seen recent success as well by winning 2 league titles in 2004 & 2006, a district title in 2008, and have made three playoff appearances since 2004 including a 5th place state finish in 2006. In 2007, the Girls' Basketball team won the State 2A Championship while the Boys Basketball team went on to win 3rd place. 2008 marks the second consecutive year that both teams qualified for the state tournament.

State Championships
Season	Sport	Number of Championships	Year(s)
Fall		0	
Winter	Basketball, girls	3 official, 1 WBF	2005*, 2007, 2008, 2010
Spring	Track and Field, girls	2	1994, 1995
other	Dance/Drill	1	2007 (Hip-hop)
Total		6	

*originally awarded 2nd place, revised to "won by fault" after Chief Sealth High School team stripped of first place, title is officially vacant

State Tournament runner-up results and appearances

- Girls Swimming- 8th, 2006; 5th, 2007 (based on individual races)
- Baseball - 5th, 2006; DNP, 2008
- Basketball, Boys - DNP, 2001; 3rd, 2007; DNP, 2008; 3rd, 2009
- Basketball, Girls - DNP, 2004; 5th, 2006;
- Fastpitch - DNP, 2007; 7th, 2008
- Football - Lost QF, 1998; Lost qualifier, 2004;
- Track & Field, Boys - 7th, 1994; 6th, 1995; 4th, 1999; 3rd, 2000; 5th, 2001; 5th, 2004; 6th, 2007;
- Track & Field, Girls - 7th, 1996; 8th, 2000; 4th, 2001; 7th, 2007;
- Volleyball - 3rd, 1995; 6th, 2003
- Wrestling - 12th, 2003; 12th, 2006; 2nd, 2014; 5th,2014

Academic State Championships

- Boys Tennis - 2005
- Boys Golf - 2005

== Notable alumni ==
- Jerramy Stevens, former tight end for Tampa Bay Buccaneers and Seattle Seahawks.
