= Lacey, Washington =

City in Washington, United States

Lacey
- City
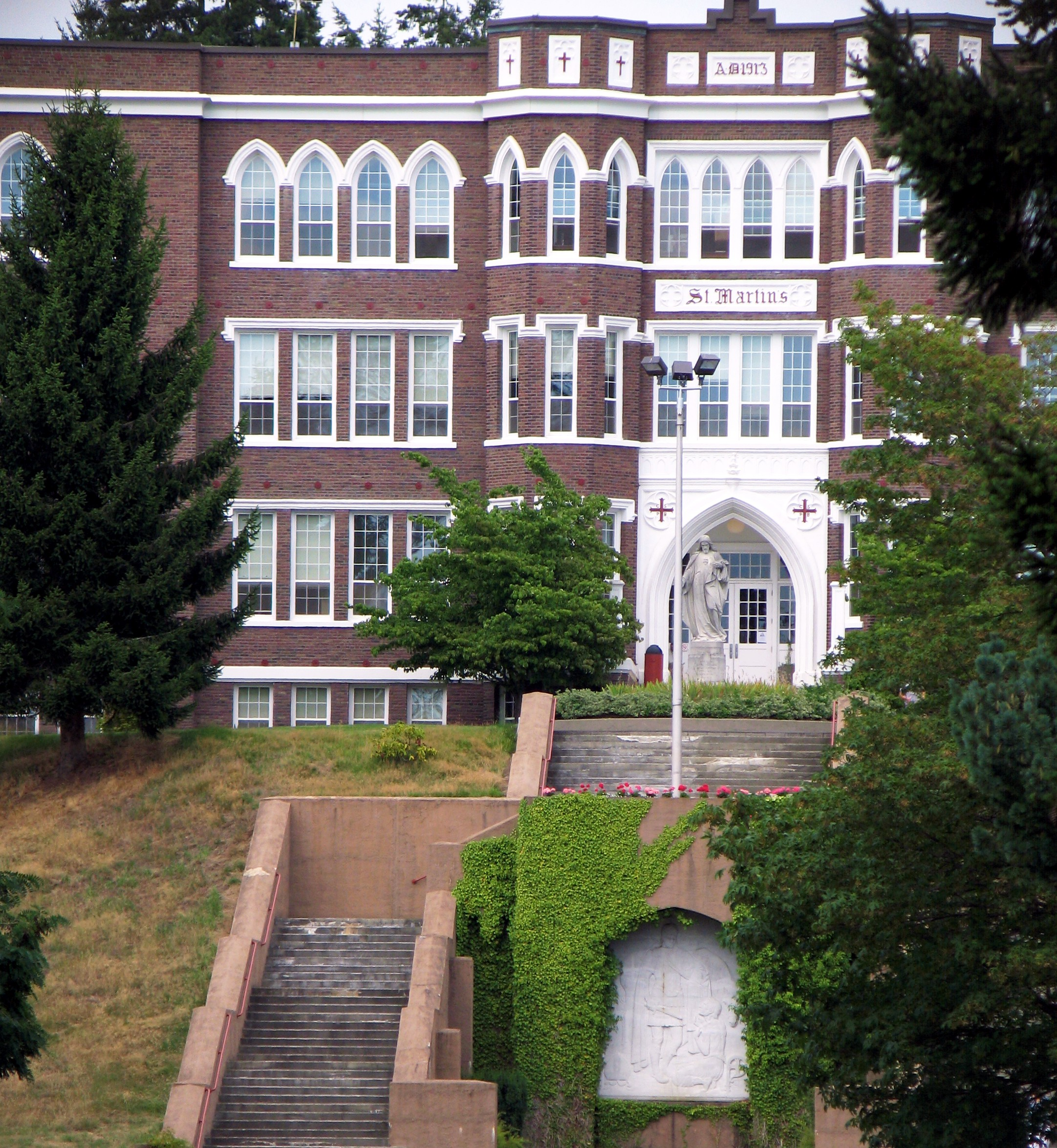
- St. Martin's University in Lacey
- Interactive map of Lacey
- Coordinates: 47°1′35″N 122°48′26″W
- Country: United States
- State: Washington
- County: Thurston
- Incorporated: December 5, 1966

Government
  - Type: Council–manager
  - Mayor: Andy Ryder
  - Deputy mayor: Malcolm Miller

Area
  - City: 17.66 sq mi (45.75 km^{2})
  - Land: 17.20 sq mi (44.55 km^{2})
  - Water: 0.46 sq mi (1.20 km^{2})
- Elevation: 177 ft (54 m)

Population (2020)
  - City: 53,526
  - Estimate (2024): 58,644
  - Rank: US: 669th WA: 23rd
  - Density: 3,057.7/sq mi (1,180.57/km^{2})
  - Metro: 298,758 (US: 172nd)
- Time zone: UTC-8 (Pacific (PST))
  - Summer (DST): UTC-7 (PDT)
- ZIP Code: 98516
- Area code: 360, 564
- FIPS code: 53-36745
- GNIS feature ID: 2411588
- Website: cityoflacey.org

Lacey is a city in Thurston County, Washington, United States. It is a suburb of Olympia with a population of 53,526 at the 2020 census, making it the 24th most populous city in Washington. Lacey is located along Interstate 5 between Olympia and the Nisqually River, which marks the border with Pierce County and Joint Base Lewis–McChord.

== History ==
=== Early settlement ===
Lacey was originally called Woodland after settlers Isaac and Catherine Wood, who claimed land there in 1853. By 1891, the railroad had come to the community of Woodland and the residents decided it was time to apply for a post office. The request was denied because there was already a town called Woodland on the Columbia River. The name Lacey was chosen for the new post office application, presumably after O. C. Lacey, a Justice of the Peace in Olympia. The small settlements of Woodland and Chambers Prairie consolidated into Lacey in the 1950s.

=== 20th century ===
Initial studies on incorporation of the Lacey area were undertaken in 1963 by a local chamber of commerce to prevent the City of Olympia from annexing the area. The study proposed an incorporated area of 5.64 square miles (14.6 km^{2}) that would encompass 5,738 residents. A proposal to incorporate Lacey was placed before voters at a special election on August 11, 1964, and was defeated by a margin of over 300 votes.

A second attempt to incorporate 10.29 square miles (26.7 km^{2}) and 8,860 residents into the City of Lacey was proposed in 1966. Voters approved incorporation in the November 8, 1966, election, by a margin of approximately 200 votes. The City of Lacey was officially incorporated on December 5, 1966, after the election results were certified. The City of Olympia responded with a special election to annex 2 square miles (5.2 km^{2}) that would be withdrawn from Lacey under provisions of a state law. The special election would encompass the entirety of Olympia rather than be solely restricted to the affected area; it was approved on January 24, 1967.

At the time, the main industries were cattle, milk, forest products, and retail. Lacey later became a commuter town for Olympia, Fort Lewis, and, to some extent, Tacoma. In 1975, the local Jaycees chapter proposed moving the county seat for Thurston County from Olympia to Lacey to give the city "an identity" beyond being a bedroom community.

=== 21st century ===
In April 2025, a Tesla supercharger station located on Sleater-Kinney Road was vandalized. The act, originally reported as an explosion, was being investigated by the FBI as possibly a form of domestic terrorism and perhaps connected to a larger form of protest against the company.

== Geography ==
Lacey generally lies between Olympia to the west and the Nisqually River delta (which includes the Billy Frank Jr. Nisqually National Wildlife Refuge) to the east. The city's northernmost point is along the Nisqually Reach on Puget Sound adjacent to Tolmie State Park and its southern boundary is a section of the BNSF Railway's Seattle Subdivision, a major freight and passenger railway.

According to the United States Census Bureau, the city has a total area of 16.51 square miles (42.76 km^{2}), of which, 16.06 square miles (41.60 km^{2}) is land and 0.45 square miles (1.17 km^{2}) is water.

== Demographics ==
Historical population
Census	Pop.	Note	%±
1960	6,630		—
1970	9,696		46.2%
1980	13,940		43.8%
1990	19,279		38.3%
2000	31,226		62.0%
2010	42,393		35.8%
2020	53,526		26.3%
2024 (est.)	58,644		9.6%
U.S. Decennial Census; 2020 Census

=== 2020 census ===
As of the 2020 census, Lacey had a population of 53,526. The median age was 36.5 years. 22.6% of residents were under the age of 18 and 18.5% of residents were 65 years of age or older. For every 100 females there were 91.6 males, and for every 100 females age 18 and over there were 88.1 males age 18 and over.

100.0% of residents lived in urban areas, while 0.0% lived in rural areas.

There were 20,906 households in Lacey, of which 31.7% had children under the age of 18 living in them. Of all households, 49.0% were married-couple households, 15.5% were households with a male householder and no spouse or partner present, and 28.0% were households with a female householder and no spouse or partner present. About 26.6% of all households were made up of individuals and 12.2% had someone living alone who was 65 years of age or older.

There were 22,039 housing units, of which 5.1% were vacant. The homeowner vacancy rate was 0.8% and the rental vacancy rate was 5.9%.

Racial composition as of the 2020 census
Race	Number	Percent
White	34,071	63.7%
Black or African American	3,135	5.9%
American Indian and Alaska Native	663	1.2%
Asian	4,859	9.1%
Native Hawaiian and Other Pacific Islander	1,352	2.5%
Some other race	2,411	4.5%
Two or more races	7,035	13.1%
Hispanic or Latino (of any race)	6,764	12.6%

=== 2010 census ===
As of the 2010 census, there were 42,393 people, 16,949 households, and 10,869 families residing in the city. The population density was 2,639.7 inhabitants per square mile (1,019.2/km^{2}). There were 18,493 housing units at an average density of 1,151.5 per square mile (444.6/km^{2}). The racial makeup of the city was 74.2% White, 5.4% African American, 1.2% Native American, 8.0% Asian, 1.7% Pacific Islander, 2.6% from other races, and 7.0% from two or more races. Hispanic or Latino of any race were 9.2% of the population.

There were 16,949 households, of which 33.9% had children under the age of 18 living with them, 46.7% were married couples living together, 12.9% had a female householder with no husband present, 4.5% had a male householder with no wife present, and 35.9% were non-families. 28.3% of all households were made up of individuals, and 11% had someone living alone who was 65 years of age or older. The average household size was 2.44 and the average family size was 2.99.

The median age in the city was 34 years. 24.6% of residents were under the age of 18; 10.1% were between the ages of 18 and 24; 29.5% were from 25 to 44; 21.8% were from 45 to 64; and 14.1% were 65 years of age or older. The gender makeup of the city was 47.4% male and 52.6% female.

=== 2000 census ===
As of 2000 the median income for a household in the city was $46,848, and the median income for a family was $54,923. Males had a median income of $41,053 versus $32,497 for females. The per capita income for the city was $20,224. About 7.1% of families and 8.8% of the population were below the poverty line, including 10.5% of those under age 18 and 5.5% of those age 65 or over.

=== Neighborhoods ===
Mushroom Corner is located along Interstate 5 and is included in the Tanglewilde-Thompson Place census-designated place (CDP) for census purposes. The "corner" in Mushroom Corner is located at the intersection of Steilacoom Road SE and Marvin Road SE. The community takes its name from the local mushroom crop; the Ostrom Mushroom Farm formerly operated nearby.

== Economy ==
The largest retail area in Lacey is the South Sound Center, which opened in 1966 and was originally an enclosed mall until 2000. Plans to develop a city center near the mall were considered as early as the 1990s to revitalize the area around the civic campus. The Lacey Gateway was developed in the 2000s and is home to a Cabela's store, but failed to attract other major tenants. The Nisqually Tribe announced plans in 2023 to build Quiemuth Resort, a casino resort with a 350-room hotel adjacent to Lacey Gateway, and a mixed-use development at a nearby site.

The city designated 500 acres (200 ha) of land in the Hawks Prairie area for industrial use in the 1990s with the intent of attracting high-tech businesses. It instead was developed into large warehouses and distribution centers that serve the Puget Sound region and connect with the Port of Seattle and Port of Tacoma. In 2003, retailer Target opened its West Coast distribution center in Lacey with 1.7 million square feet (160,000 m^{2}) of space—among the largest warehouses in the U.S. by usable volume. The city council passed a cap of 200,000 square feet (19,000 m^{2}) for new warehouses in 2006, but lifted it in 2015 for additional development.

=== Sustainability ===
Lacey was the twelfth city to be designated an official "Green Power Community" by the U.S. Environmental Protection Agency for its use of renewable energy sources; 8.4% of its total energy use comes from green power sources. It is working to meet its Alternative Energy Initiative, which includes using 100 percent green electrical energy in all of its municipal buildings, parks, utilities, and 3,000 streetlights and traffic signals; providing electric vehicle charging stations to visitors and employees at its city hall and library campus; and initiating conversion of its municipal fleet to energy efficient vehicles powered by electricity, hybrid technology, and 80/20 biofuel. Lacey has received the "Tree City, USA" designation from the National Arbor Day Foundation for 26 years.

=== Top Employers ===
As of 2023, the city had an unemployment rate of 4.1% and an estimated 34,160 jobs; Lacey's top employers were:

Rank	Employer	Employees in 2023	Employees in 2014	2023 Share	2014 Share
1	State of Washington	▼2,520	2,590	▼7.4%	12%
2	North Thurston Public Schools	▲2,000	1,700	▼5.9%	8%
3	Amazon	▲838	-	▲2.5%	-
4	St. Martin's University	▲612	100-500	▲1.8%	1%
5	PetSmart	▲480	-	▲1.4%	-
6	Harbor Wholesale	▲407	-	▲1.2%	-
7	South Sound Behavior Hospital	▲405	-	▲1.2%	-
8	Medline Industries	▲393	-	▲1.2%	-
9	Walmart	368	100-500	1.1%	1%
10	City of Lacey	▲330	241	1%	1%

== Arts and culture ==
The city instituted a poet laureate position in 2022. The first person to serve in the position was Cynthia Pratt, a former deputy mayor and councilwoman for Lacey.

=== Historical buildings and sites ===
The city has two buildings listed on the National Register of Historic Places. The Chambers' Prairie-Ruddell Pioneer Cemetery, located in southeast Lacey, is considered the "last tangible link" to historic pioneers and settlers who helped to create the Washington Territory and grow the southern Puget Sound region. The Long Lake Recreation Hall, also known as Heritage Hall, is located at the Thurston County Fairgrounds.

The Lacey Historical Commission formed a registry in the mid-1990s to recognize historic homes in the community. By 1998, the commission selected the cemetery and five homes, including the Jacob Smith House, the oldest known residence in Lacey. In 2011, the commission had recognized 69 other properties for potential inclusion to the registry.

As of 2026, seven historical markers are located in Lacey, including three documenting the Lacey Depot, Lacey Plywood Company, and Lacey Rotary Club located on the Karen Fraser Woodland Trail near the train station. Markers are located at two homesteads, the Andrew Jackson Chambers and Himes and Fleetwood sites, as well as the Chambers-to-Chalet location. A marker documenting the history of the Jackson Family and Goose Pond is placed at Woodland Creek Park.

=== Library ===
The first public library in Lacey was located in the basement of the Lacey School during the 1930s; it closed by the end of the decade as the schoolhouse needed more room to expand. In 1962, an association was formed to begin raising money for a new library. A bookmobile, nicknamed the "No Go-Go Bookmobile" due to a lack of wheels, had been donated in 1965 from the South Puget Sound Regional Library. A storefront library in Market Square was opened in 1966 and moved to the Lacey Village Shopping Center in 1978. Bond measures to support the construction of a library failed in 1979 and 1987; the city of Lacey agreed to cover half the cost of a library build in 1988 with donations supporting the remaining funding needs. Construction began in 1990 and the Lacey Timberland Regional Library located on College Street opened the following year.

=== Public art ===
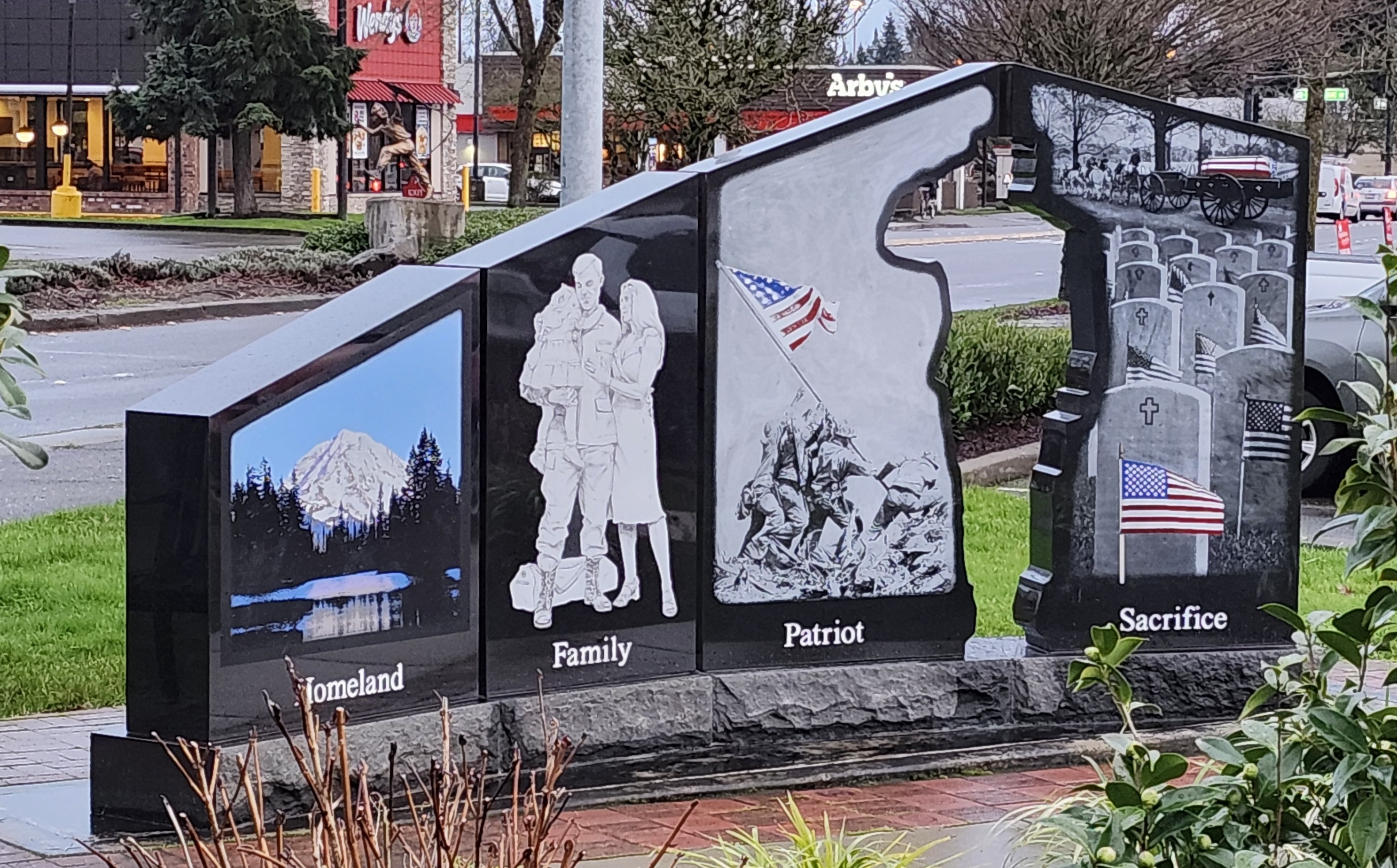
Gold Star Families Memorial Monument, 2026

Public art in Lacey is funded in part by an annual 25-cent fee per individual taxpayer. The collected funds are budgeted for artwork improvements and maintenance in the community.

A pair of bronze sculptures known as Kite Girl and Kite Boy are located specifically at main entrance points into Lacey. The artwork of the little girl is 7 feet (2.1 m) tall and situated on a pedestal; it was installed in late 1999 on Pacific Avenue at the border between Lacey and Olympia. The boy statue, 5 feet 4 inches (163 cm) in height, was not placed at its permanent location on Sleater-Kinney Road near I-5 until May 2008 after several attempts were undertaken to find a suitable spot for the piece. Another bronze sculpture, The Hawk, is located in a roundabout at an interstate entrance point to the city.

Additional public artworks include two works located at the Lacey Timberland Regional Library, a bronze sculpture of a woman and child reading a book titled Sharing, and a chainsaw carving known as Family of Bears on a Log. An additional chainsaw work by the same artist, a bench with bears, is located in the Lacey Head Start Program building. The historic Kluh Clock, donated to the city in 2001, is a noted landmark at South Sound Center.

In 2023, the Gold Star Families Memorial Monument was dedicated, honoring soldiers who died in combat and their Gold Star families. Lacey has an additional artwork dedicated to military members and their families, a bronze statue known as Welcome Home.

== Parks and recreation ==
A paved rail trail, the Karen Fraser Woodland Trail, connects Lacey and Olympia, crossing at a junction with the Chehalis Western Trail on the border between the two cities. Other trails include the I-5 Trail and pathways located in two nature preserves, including the Mullen Road Habitat Reserve.

Lacey's largest and newest park is Greg Cuoio Park. Opened in 2026, the 139-acre (56 ha) site is planned to be expanded in the future to 537 acres (217 ha). The mostly forested site is named after a long-serving city manager and includes 3 miles (4.8 km) of trails, a 2-acre (0.81 ha) open area, a disc golf course, and a playground.

== Education ==
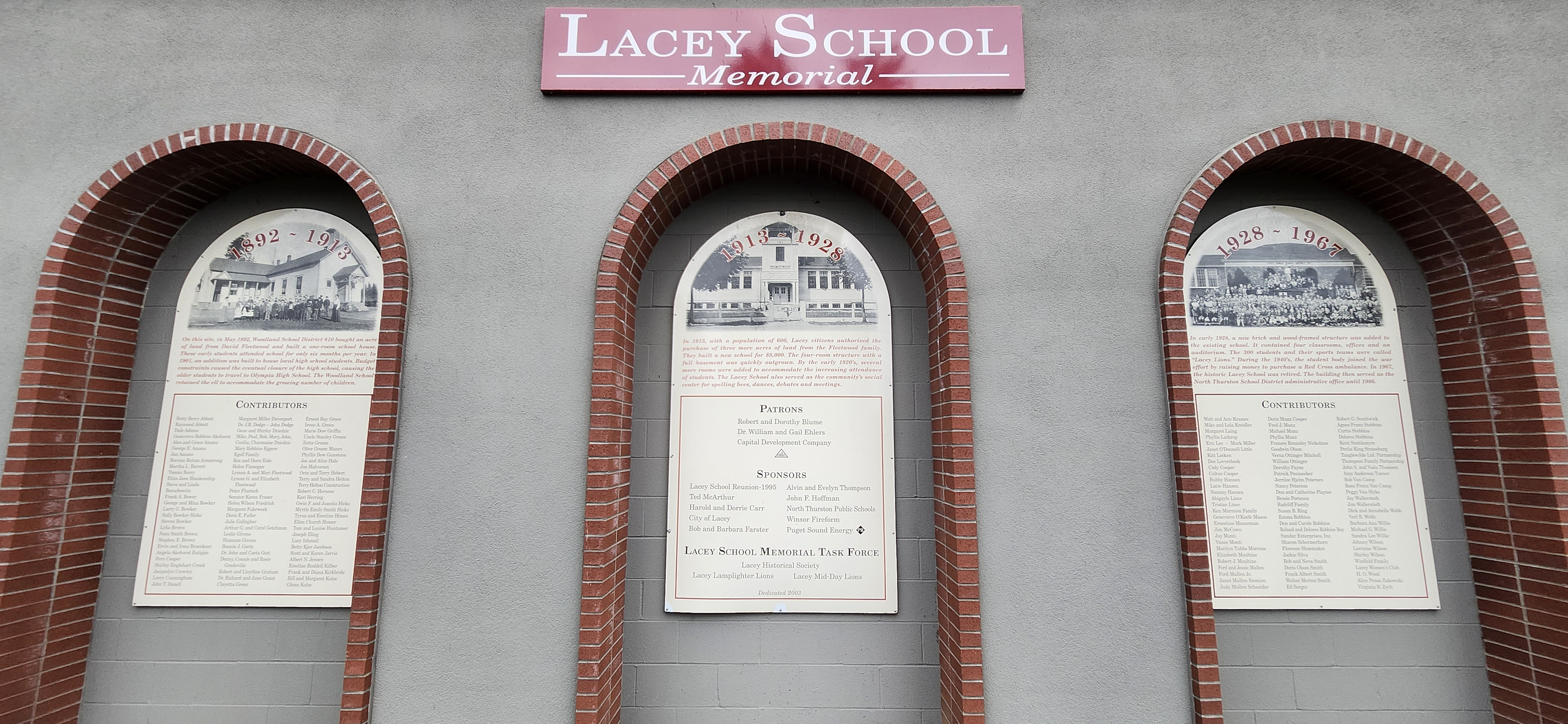
Lacey School Memorial, 2026

The first school in Lacey was constructed in 1853. The 16 ft × 20 ft (4.9 m × 6.1 m), one-room schoolhouse remained the only educational facility in the community until 1953; students were served until it closed in 1967. Originally located near the Ruddell Pioneer Cemetery, it was moved permanently to the intersection of Carpenter Road and Pacific Avenue in 1892, expanding to include a high school in 1901. The facilities were enlarged and remodeled several times in the following decades. The campus was demolished in 1994 and artifacts from the school, as well as photographic murals, have been displayed at a Safeway grocery store that has since occupied the grounds. The store was built with bricks from the original school and features a replica bell tower similar to the first schoolhouse.

The city is entirely within the boundaries of North Thurston Public Schools, the largest school district in Thurston County. Lacey is also home to various faith based schools, such as Holy Family School (Roman Catholic Preschool through 8th grade), Faith Lutheran School (Preschool through 8th Grade) and Foundation Campus, which includes Community Christian Academy (Pre-school to Middle School) and Northwest Christian High School. Lacey is also the home of Pope John Paul II High School.

Lacey is also home to Saint Martin's University, a private four-year university that was founded in 1895 by the Order of Saint Benedict. The Olympia-based South Puget Sound Community College opened a satellite center in a Hawks Prairie strip mall in 1995 to serve Lacey. It was replaced in September 2015 by a larger branch campus at a former office park. The college had also purchased 54.5 acres (22.1 ha) in 2005 to build a larger permanent campus, but sold the land after issues with wetlands mitigation were discovered.

=== Public secondary schools ===
Junior high schools in Lacey include Chinook, Komachin, Nisqually, and Salish middle schools. The education system also includes a magnet school, Aspire Middle School.

High schools in Lacey include North Thurston High School, River Ridge High School, and Timberline High School. An alternative high school, South Sound High School, was closed as of 2021.

== Infrastructure ==
=== Transportation ===
Lacey is bisected from west to east by Interstate 5, a north–south freeway connecting Seattle to Portland, Oregon. The first diverging diamond interchange in Washington opened in August 2020 at a junction in Lacey between Interstate 5 and Marvin Road (State Route 510). As of 2021, the city maintains 178.6 miles (287.4 km) of streets within its city limits.

The city is served by Intercity Transit, the public transit system for Thurston County, and is the eastern terminus of The One bus rapid transit line. The agency also runs express buses from Olympia and Lacey to Lakewood with onward connections to other transit systems. The county's only Amtrak station, Centennial Station, is located near Lacey's southern boundary and is served by daily Cascades and Coast Starlight trains.

=== Utilities ===
As of 2013, the city government provides tap water to over 22,000 customers, of which 89 percent are classified as residential users. Lacey sources its water from 19 groundwater wells and maintains seven reservoirs and 357 miles (575 km) of water mains to deliver and distribute water throughout the city.

=== Healthcare ===
The largest hospital in Thurston County is the Providence St. Peter Hospital, which has a 372-bed capacity and is located northwest of Lacey. St. Peter Hospital was originally located in Olympia from its foundation in 1887 until January 1971, when its current location opened outside of the city limits. It is operated by Providence Health & Services, a not-for-profit Catholic healthcare provider that also has outpatient and specialty facilities in Lacey. The city also has an off-campus emergency room for the MultiCare Capital Medical Center, the other major hospital in the Olympia area. The facility opened in 2023 and has 18 beds. A mental health hospital was opened in Lacey by US HealthVest in 2018 and a second facility with 85 beds was planned by Providence St. Peter Hospital and Fairfax Behavioral Health. The Providence–Fairfax plan was later put on hold after Fairfax announced in 2023 that they would not pursue the project.

== Notable people ==
- Elizabeth Ayer, architect
- Andrew Barkis, state legislator
- Brad Blackburn, MMA fighter
- Buford O. Furrow, perpetrator of the 1999 Los Angeles Jewish Community Center shooting
- Tom Dutra, soccer player and coach
- Karen Fraser, state legislator
- Ron Holmes, American football player
- Kasey Keller, soccer player
- Mike Kreidler, U.S. representative, state legislator, and Insurance Commissioner of Washington
- Janice Langbehn, gay activist
- Ed Murray, state legislator and mayor of Seattle
- Mike Sellers, American football player
- Jerramy Stevens, American football player
- Jonathan Stewart, American football player
- Joseph Wohleb, architect
- Kim Wyman, former Secretary of State of Washington

== Sister city ==
Lacey has a sister city in Poland, Mińsk Mazowiecki.
