= Long Lake Recreation Hall =

NRHP-listed historic building in Lacey, Washington

- U.S. National Register of Historic Places
- Washington State Heritage Register
- Thurston County Historic Register
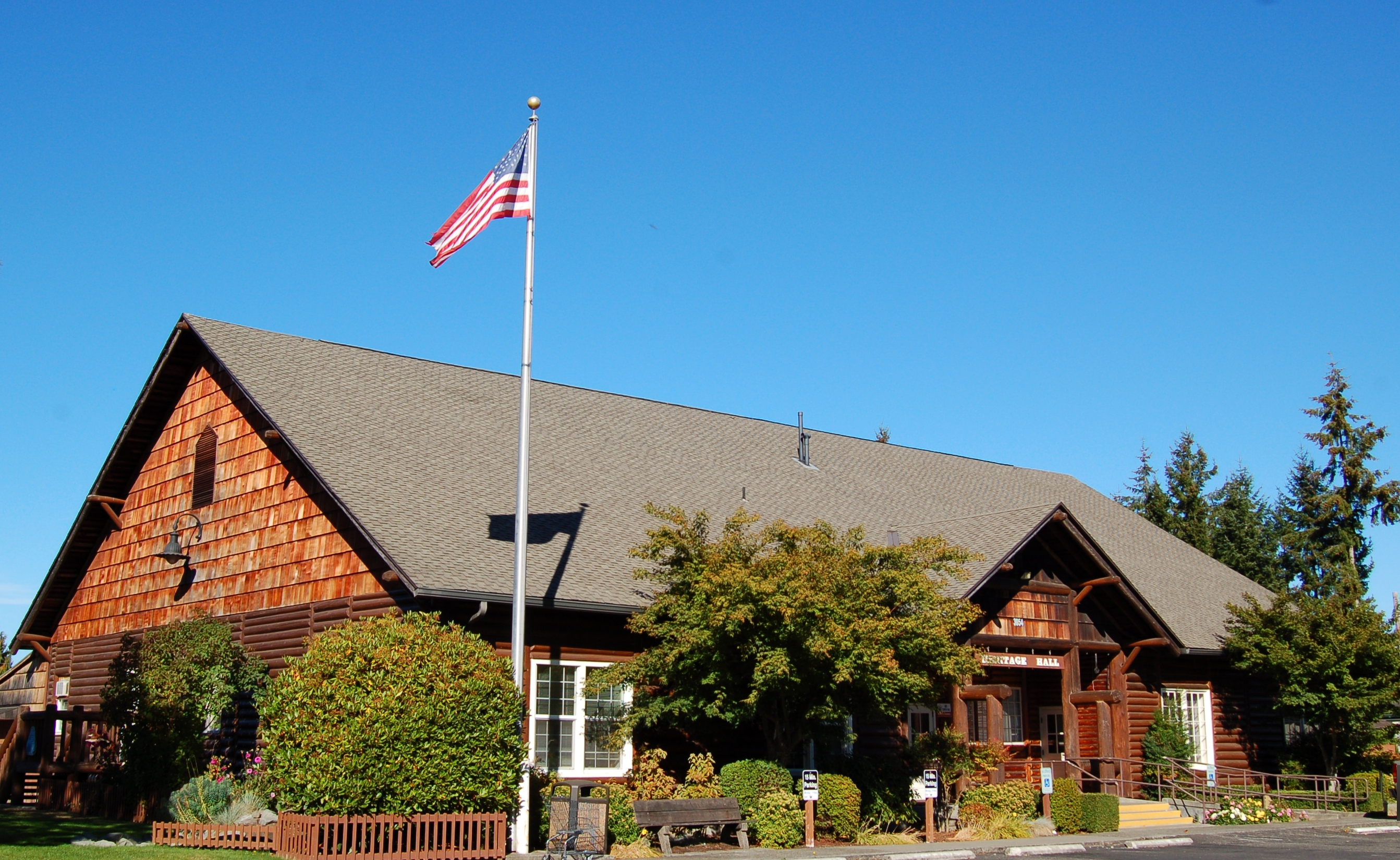
- Long Lake Recreation Hall, 2012

- Location within Washington (state)
- Location: 3054 Carpenter Road SE, Lacey, Washington
- Coordinates: 47°01′13″N 122°47′05″W
- Area: less than one acre
- Built: 1933
- Built by: Civilian Conservation Corps (CCC)
- Architect: Unknown
- Architectural style: Rustic architecture
- Restored: 2006
- Website: Heritage Hall
- MPS: Historic Resources of Unincorporated Thurston County
- NRHP reference No.: 88000697

Significant dates
- Added to NRHP: June 23, 1988
- Designated WSHR: 1988
- Designated TCHR: 1987

Long Lake Recreation Hall, more formally known as Heritage Hall, is an historic meeting hall situated within the Thurston County Fairgrounds in Lacey, Washington. The hall was added to the National Register of Historic Places in 1988.

Constructed in the 1930s by either the Civilian Conservation Corps or the Works Progress Administration, the 1 1/2-story, log-built hall was the first feature of the fairgrounds, which was officially established around the site in the late 1950s. The building, formally renamed "Heritage Hall" in 1958, is considered to be in an almost unaltered state.

Additionally listed to other county and state historic registers, Heritage Hall was declared a Thurston County Heritage Site in 2026.

== History ==
The land for Long Lake Recreation Hall had been donated by Katherine Ritzman specifically for "recreational purposes". Trees on the parcel were used to build the hall, which was first constructed in 1933 by the Civilian Conservation Corps (CCC) for use as a community center. The Works Progress Administration is reported to also have built the hall, doing so between 1938 and 1939. (Note: Although Heritage Hall is listed in the historic nomination form as being constructed in 1933 by the CCC, the Thurston County Historic Commission reports the building as officially built by the WPA, stating on a stone marker that it was completed in 1938. See sources in the article for the discrepancy.)

Into the 1940s, the hall was a gathering spot for numerous meetings and social events, and the first Thurston County Fair to be held on the grounds occurred in 1941; after World War II, the event restarted at the center in 1946. (Note: The first Thurston County Fair occurred in 1871 at downtown Olympia's Columbia Hall and was held for stretches of time; sometimes the event was cancelled due to lack of funds. The fair disbanded during World War I but restarted. The event was not produced during World War II but has been held annually since 1946. Before permanently being located at the fairgrounds, the event had been held at twenty different locations in the county.) The county event was relocated to other locations, including Tenino, afterwards. The building became owned by the Thurston County Fair in 1952, and was officially deeded in 1953. The fair permanently resumed at the Long Lake Recreation Hall grounds in 1958. During the same year, the fair's administrative office was relocated to the building and the center was renamed "Heritage Hall". (Note: Further discrepancies in the construction date includes reporting by The Olympian, stating the hall to be built in 1941, or dedicated in 1946. The purpose of the dedication is unknown via the source.)

The original 5-acre (2.0 ha) grounds became the beginnings of the Thurston County Fairgrounds. The site expanded in 1958 to 15 acres (6.1 ha), along with the construction of other buildings, to qualify as a "Class B" fair. Remaining trees on the hall's grounds were cut and sold to both fund the efforts and provide space for the new fairgrounds.

== Geography ==
The recreation hall is located within the Thurston County Fairgrounds in Lacey, Washington. Heritage Hall is 2 miles (3.2 km) west of Long Lake.

== Architecture and features ==
Unless otherwise noted, the details provided are based on the 1987 revised edition of the Washington state Historic Property Information Form and may not reflect updates or changes to Long Lake Recreation Hall in the interim.

The architect of the hall is unknown. At the time of the NRHP nomination, the structure was noted to have intact original cladding and windows, with slight alterations to the interior. Heritage Hall was renovated in 2006.

=== Exterior ===
The hall is a 1 1/2-story, rectangular structure built over a post and pier foundation. The gable roof is sheathed in wood shingles. Exposed rafters and purlins, along with two protruding brick chimneys, were other noted features of the roof.

The exterior walls are peeled logs laid horizontally; tall, various multi-light windows are framed with vertical logs. The gable ends are sheathed in wood shake. The main entrance is located on the south façade and features a centered, recessed porch covered by an open fretwork gable supported by log timbers. A carved sign, denoting the building as "Heritage Hall", hangs from the gable.

=== Interior ===
At the time of the NRHP nomination, the interior was noted to have undergone a few alterations, including the addition of a kitchen and office near the front entrance. The original stage located in the main hall also underwent alterations, but the auditorium, which features log walls and exposed rafters, remained unchanged.

Around 1978, light fixtures originally hung at the Thurston County Courthouse had been installed in the hall's auditorium.

=== Shed ===
A structurally unattached shed to the rear of the hall, also considered an addition, was built during the 1950s. Whether or not the shed is part of the NRHP designation is not known per the nomination form.

== Significance ==
Added to the National Register of Historic Places on June 23, 1988, the hall was declared a "historically significant example of the work of the Civilian Conservation Corps", specifically mentioning the use of the CCC's Rustic architecture-style of the time. It is the only known community hall constructed by the CCC in Thurston County.

The hall was listed to the Thurston County Historic Register in 1987 and Washington Heritage Register in 1988.

Heritage Hall was dedicated in August 2026 as a Thurston County Heritage Site. A stone monument, with a plaque denoting several historic moments of the hall, was unveiled outside the building.

== See also ==
- Millersylvania State Park
