= North Thurston Public Schools =

School district in Thurston County, Washington, USA

Address
- 305 College Street NE Lacey, Thurston County, Washington, 98516-5390; United States

District information
- Grades: PK - 12
- Established: 1953; 73 years ago
- Superintendent: Troy Oliver
- Budget: $263,000,000
- NCES District ID: 5305850

Students and staff
- Students: 15,000 (2025-26)
- Teachers: 910
- Student–teacher ratio: 16.5:1
- Athletic conference: 3A

Other information
- Website: www.ntps.org

North Thurston Public Schools, District No. 3 (NTPS) provides educational services for Lacey and parts of unincorporated Thurston County, Washington, including the Nisqually Tribe Reservation.

== Location ==
NTPS covers 74 square miles (191.7 km^{2}) of land in northeastern Thurston county.

== History ==
North Thurston Public Schools, District No. 3, was established on December 1, 1953, following the voter-approved consolidation of Lacey School District No. 317 and South Bay School District No. 304 at a special election held earlier in the year on November 11. Previous consolidations that resulted in the two component districts were as follows;

- On April 14, 1917, voters approved the consolidation of South Bay School District No. 11, Puget School District No. 48, and Pleasant Glade School District No. 50 at a special election, forming South Bay School District No. 304.
- Around 1920, Chamber's Prairie School District No. 8 and Lacey School District No. 10 consolidated, becoming Lacey School District No. 308, following a voter-approved special election.
- On June 1, 1925, voters approved the consolidation of McAllister Springs School District No. 75 and Lacey School District No. 308 at a special election, forming Lacey School District No. 317.

On September 25, 1962, the Washington State Department of Education approved the request of the Board of Directors of Nisqually School District No. 35 to have their school district annexed into North Thurston Public Schools, precluding the need to a special election. Pupils of School District No. 35 had already been receiving their education in North Thurston Public Schools since 1960, following the closure of the Nisqually schoolhouse.

== Schools ==
High Schools (Grades 9–12)
High School	Type	Established	Enrollment	Mascot	WIAA Classification
North Thurston	comprehensive	1955	1,419	Rams	3A
River Ridge	comprehensive	1993	1,533	Hawks	3A
Timberline High School	comprehensive	1970	1,433	Blazers	3A

Middle Schools
Name	Type	Established	Enrollment	Mascot
Chinook	6-8	1961	710	Orcas
Komachin	6-8	1992	643	Wolves
Nisqually	6-8	1967	817	Totems
Salish	6-8	2016	790	Ravens

Elementary Schools
Name	Grade Levels	Established	Enrollment	Mascot	Remarks
Chambers Prairie	K-5, Future-Ready Kindergarten	2009	494	Wolf	
Evergreen Forest	K-5	1978	479	Bobcats	
Horizons	K-5, Future-Ready Kindergarten	1992	561	Eagles	
Lacey	K-5, Future-Ready Kindergarten	1968	373	Husky pups	
Lakes	K-5, Future-Ready Kindergarten	1964	501	Leopards	
Lydia Hawk	K-5, dual language program, Future-Ready Kindergarten	1959	500	Hawks	
Meadows	P,K-5	1986	739	Mustangs	
Mountain View	P,K-5, dual language program, Future-Ready Kindergarten	1957	731	Bobcats	
Olympic View	K-5, Future-Ready Kindergarten	1970	611	Eagles	
Pleasant Glade	P,K-5, dual language program	1987	509	Panthers	
Seven Oaks	P,K-5, Future-Ready Kindergarten	1990	431	Bulldogs	
South Bay	K-5	1953	588	Bruins	
Woodland	K-5	1981	461	Wildcats	

Choice Schools
Name	Type	Established	Enrollment	Mascot
Aspire Performing Arts Academy	6-8 arts	2009	306	Firebirds
Envision Career Academy	9-12 cte	2020	158	Fyre Gryphons
Ignite Family Academy	K-8 family partnership program	2021	97	N/A
Summit Virtual Academy	K-12 virtual	2021	366	Mountaineers

== Closed Schools ==
- South Sound High School - An alternative school of choice
- New Century High School - An experimental school that ran on an evening/nighttime schedule.
- Puget Sound High School - An alternative school that combined with New Century to form South Sound High School.

== Student Demographics ==
2024-25 Student Diversity
Ethnicity	Percent
Hispanic / Latino of any race(s)	25.0%
American Indian / Alaskan Native	1%
Asian	7.8%
Black / African American	5.7%
Native Hawaiian / Other Pacific Islander	3.8%
White	40.9%
Two or More Races	15.7%
