= South Puget Sound Community College =

Public college in Olympia, Washington, US

Coordinates: 47°01′23″N 122°55′49″W

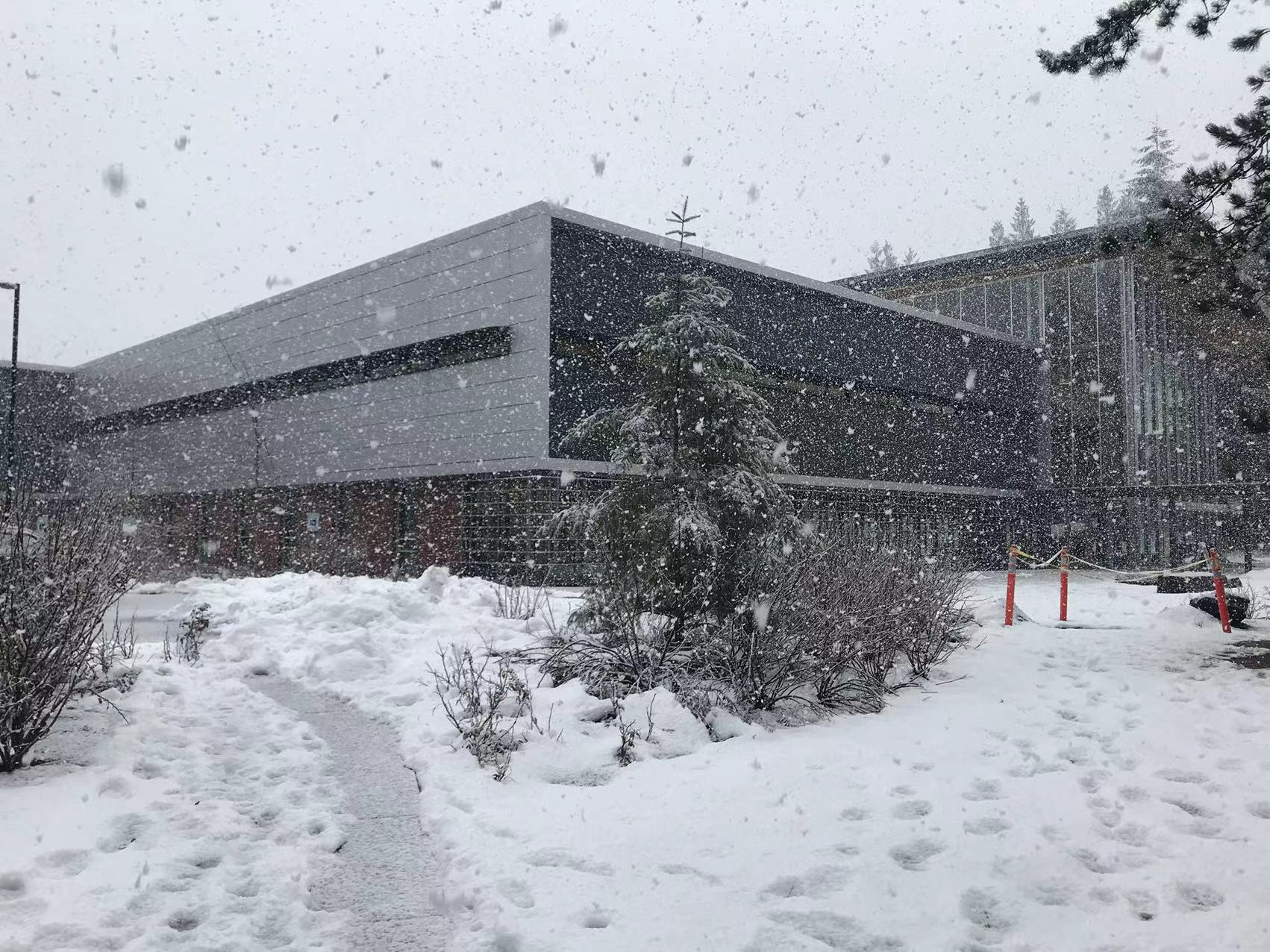
- Type: Community college
- Established: 1962
- President: Timothy Stokes
- Faculty: 95 Full-Time; 232 Part-Time (Fall 2023)
- Students: 4,252 (Fall 2023)
- Location: Olympia, Washington, United States
- Campus: 125 acres (0.51 km^{2})
- Mascot: Clippers
- Website: www.spscc.edu

South Puget Sound Community College is a public community college in southwest Olympia, Washington. The college contains 125 acres (0.51 km^{2}) and is serving about 5,300 full and part-time students as of the fall 2020 quarter.

The school offers transfer associate degree programs, transition studies program, professional technical programs, and corporate and continuing education programs. As of fall 2020, SPSCC offers 78 degrees and certificates in 30 areas. It also offers short-term study abroad program designed by the Washington State Community College Consortium for Study Abroad (WCCCSA).

In 2021, SPSCC was named among the nations' 150 best community colleges by the Aspen Institute, which is determined by student outcomes in learning, completion rates, employments rates and incomes, and equity.

== History ==
South Puget Sound Community College was established in 1962 as Olympia Vocational Technical Institute (OVTI) located at the old Montgomery Ward Building in downtown Olympia. The Olympia school board had been working since 1957 to widen education opportunity in the Olympia area for adults, originally via classes offered at Olympia High School. By 1966, technical training expanded to 14 fields in respect to Olympia citizens' requests. The Community College Act of 1967 gave the Olympia Vocational Institute the option to either remain with Olympia School District or to merge into the community college system. The school decided to join the community college system, merging into district 12 under the control of Centralia Community College, becoming Olympia Technical Community College (OTCC) in 1976.

By 1982, a few hundred students were first awarded Associate of Arts Degree and more programs were added at the school. In 1984, college was renamed South Puget Sound Community College to reflect its progressive record.

== Academics ==
=== Transfer Degrees ===
Many SPSCC students transfer to a 4-year university or college as a college junior after earning an Associate’s Degree with 90 credits at SPSCC. Under the direct transfer agreement (DTA), many Washington State colleges, out-of-state colleges accept DTA degree. In the year 2017-2018, 77% of DTA graduates have transferred to public institutions in Washington state, 11% transferred to out-of-state public institutions, and 10% transferred to other private institutions. Direct transfer degree includes Associate in Arts, Associate in Biology, Associate in Business, Associate in Computer Science, Associate in Music, Associate in Nursing, and Associate in Pre Nursing. In addition to those direct transfer degrees, an Associate in Science degree is also offered.

=== Transition Studies Program ===
Transition Studies Program courses includes Adult Basic Education (ABE), Integrated Basic Education and Skills Training program (I-BEST), HS+ (High School+), GED preparation classes, and the English as a Second Language (ESL) program.

=== Professional Technical Program ===
The Professional Technical Program offers 20 programs designed for gaining technical skills for future careers or to prepare for a new career. After the completion of the program, students can earn Associate in Applied Science degree or a certification.

=== Corporate and Continuing Education ===
The Corporate and Continuing Education program offers classes that are dedicated to specific skills such as consulting, personal training, and start-up training for students to learn and acquire in accordance with their interests.

== Student media ==
A student-led magazine, The Sounds, is provided approximately once a month, throughout the school. The change from newspaper to magazine happened in 2019. The Sounds provides news related to Campus life, Community, Arts & Entertainment, and Op-ed.

== Campus ==
=== Hawks Prairie Campus ===
A satellite campus, referred to as the Hawks Prairie Campus, was located in the neighboring city of Lacey at the Hawks Prairie center until spring of 2015. It has since been replaced by the Lacey Campus. Similar to programs offered at the Olympia campus, the Lacey satellite also offers for-credit courses, and studies that are oriented to varying quarterly and real-life themes. In addition, Center for Business and Innovation (CB&I), dedicated to promoting Business innovation and growth is located in the Lacey campus.

=== Public art ===
A Coast Salish art sculpture, known as "Bigger", is a Welcome Figure carving installed on the campus.

== Athletics ==
South Puget Sound Community College competes in the Northwest Athletic Conference (NWAC) as the Clippers, fielding a men's and women's soccer team, a women's volleyball team and men's and women's teams for basketball.

In 2021, women's soccer team was introduced to SPSCC by the Clipper Athletics Program.

In 2021, students from Women's Volleyball and Men's Soccer were selected for the Northwest Athletic Conference (NWAC) West Region All-Star Teams.

They play baseball and soccer at the Regional Athletic Complex (Lacey, Washington)
