= River Ridge High School =

River Ridge High School may refer to:

- River Ridge High School (Florida), in New Port Richey, Florida
- River Ridge High School (Georgia), in Woodstock, Georgia
- River Ridge High School (Illinois), in Hanover, Illinois
- River Ridge High School (Washington), in Lacey, Washington, established in 1993
- River Ridge High School (Wisconsin), in Patch Grove, Wisconsin

== See also ==
- River Ridge (disambiguation)
