= Needham =

Needham may refer to:

== Places ==
=== United States ===
- Needham, Alabama
- Needham, Indiana
- Needham, Massachusetts, a suburb of Boston
  - Needham Line, a commuter rail line in Greater Boston
- Needham (Farmville, Virginia), a historic house

=== United Kingdom ===
- Needham, Norfolk, England
- Needham, Suffolk, England
- Needham Market, a town in Suffolk, England
  - Needham Market F.C., an association football club

=== Canada ===
- Halifax Needham, a Canadian electoral district

== Other uses ==
- Needham (surname)
- Needham Research Institute
- Needham-Schroeder protocol, a computer network authentication protocol designed for use on insecure network
- Needham (food), a dessert from the U.S. state of Maine
