= Lake Nahwatzel =

- Twana: dawacləɬ
- Location within Washington (state)
- Location: Mason County, Washington
- Coordinates: 47°14′34″N 123°20′00″W
- Type: lake
- Basin countries: United States
- Surface area: 269 acres (109 ha)
- Max. depth: 25 ft (7.6 m)
- Surface elevation: 453 ft (138 m)

Lake Nahwatzel (Twana: dawacleɬ) is a body of freshwater located in Mason County in the U.S. state of Washington. Lake Nahwatzel is fed by underground springs coming from the Southern edge of the Olympic Mountains. The lake empties into the East Fork of the Satsop River via Outlet Creek.

Lake Nahwatzel has a surface area of 269 acres (109 ha) and a maximum depth of 25 feet (7.6 m).

== Name ==
The name "Nahwatzel" is an Anglicization of the Twana name "dawacləɬ." The Twana name is said to mean "large lake" and is speculated by anthropologist William W. Elmendorf to be a loanword from a neighboring language, possibly Chehalis.

== Fishing ==
Lake Nahwatzel is opened to fishing year-round and is considered to be one of the best bass-fishing lakes in western Washington during the summer months. Twice a year, once in the spring and once in the fall, the lake is stocked with rainbow trout. According to the Washington Department of Fish and Wildlife, April and May or late September and October are the best months for catching rainbow trout.

== Geography ==
Lake Nahwatzel is located in the foothills of the Olympic Mountains which are located on the Olympic Peninsula of Washington State. The location of the lake means that the land is heavily wooded and dotted with many hills and streams. Nearby towns include Shelton and Matlock.

== History ==
=== Indigenous settlement ===
Prior to American settlement, the Vance Creek band of the Twana historically used Lake Nahwatzel (known in the Twana language as dawacləɬ) as a hunting ground during the summer months. They would set up camp at a nearby hill, which is named pupličəd, meaning "halfway." It was a common stop for people traveling between the Twana areas and the Satsop areas to trade, as there was a trail running from Vance Creek to the Satsop River via Lake Nahwatzel.

=== 2008 floatplane accident ===
On Thursday, July 24, 2008, a floatplane piloted by Mark Storer and his son Brian Storer experienced engine problems soon after taking off from where they had landed on the lake. The plane rose above the tree line but began to descend soon after, eventually crashing into a nearby field, killing the two men on board. The crash sparked a three-acre fire that was contained by local fire fighters within hours.

=== Controversy ===
Recently the Simpson Timber Company and their Green Diamond affiliates have begun readying to sell the undeveloped northern shoreline. The north shore of Lake Nahwatzel is currently forestland, and the sale would see new houses built on the shore over the following years. A petition was sent out in 2013 to try to get the community to purchase the property and keep it natural; however, because of a lack of support the petition in its original form failed.
