= Mary M. Knight =

US teacher, pioneer educator in Washington state

Mary Miranda Knight
- Born: Mary Miranda Dunbar; September 2, 1854; Ingham County, Michigan, US
- Died: February 2, 1940 (aged 85) (Note: February 2, 1940 is the date of death published by the Seattle Daily Times and Shelton-Mason County Journal promptly after Knight's death. The Mary M. Knight School District 311 website claimed the death occurred on January 31, 1940, likely erroneously.); Seattle, Washington, US
- Burial place: Shelton Memorial Park (Masonic division)
- Monuments: Mary M. Knight School District No. 311; Mary M. Knight High School
- Occupations: Teacher; Mason County Superintendent of Schools
- Years active: 1870–1921
- Organizations: Order of Eastern Star; Philanthropic Educational Organization
- Known for: pioneer educator of Washington state, served as the Mason County Superintendent of Schools for 18 years improving the educational system in western part of the county.
- Political party: Democrat
- Spouse: Marcus F. Knight (married 1876–1921)
- Children: 2
- Relatives: Cyrus Dunbar (brother)

Mary Miranda Knight (née Dunbar; September 2, 1854 – February 2, 1940) was a pioneer educator in Washington state. She dedicated her life to teaching, and over the years worked in three different states: Michigan, Dakota and Washington.

Knight spent most of her life in Shelton, Washington. By 1900, she became a well-known teacher and was elected to the position of the Mason County Superintendent of Schools, which she held for eighteen years. During this period, she consolidated five small school districts into one big district, providing students with more educational opportunities. The new district was later named in her honor: the Mary M. Knight School District No. 311. Knight organized communication between teachers and was praised for accuracy in management and dedication to her work. The Mary M. Knight High School in Matlock is now named in her honor.

She raised the next generation of educators – her daughters Jessie A. Knight and Gyneth Knight – who spent many years working as teachers. After her retirement, Knight was the keeper of some Washington state relics belonging to the family of George Pickett.

== Early life, family and education ==
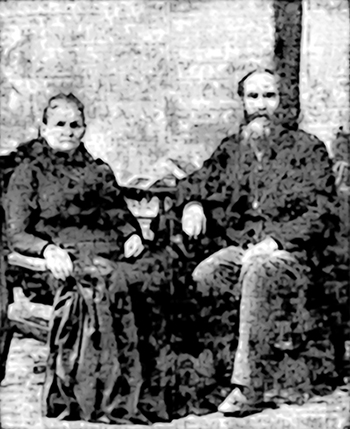
Mr. and Mrs. Charles S. Dunbar

Knight was born on September 2, 1854, in Ingham County, Michigan. The family ancestors settled in the southern Michigan state after coming to America from Scotland.

Knight's father was Charles S. Dunbar, and her mother Orphia S. Dunbar (Norton); they had seven children. Knight's parents moved several times: first to Dakota and later to Washington state, becoming two of its pioneers in 1883. At different times, five of their children followed the parents to Washington: Mary Miranda; William H. Dunbar, a Seattle expert accountant; Hiram N. Dunbar, a blacksmith of Shelton, Washington; E. Prentis Dunbar, who worked in the paint and wallpaper business in Bremerton, Washington; and Cyrus Dunbar, a pioneer druggist of Shelton.

From a young age, Knight wanted to be a teacher. She dedicated her high school years in Eaton Rapids, Michigan to gaining the necessary skills to become an educator.

== Career ==
=== Early years ===
Knight started her teaching career at sixteen. Over the years, she taught in three different states. She started as an apprentice in Michigan and worked there for several terms. Later, she joined her family in Dakota, where she worked in Huron city schools for several years.

=== Washington state ===
After a brief return to Eaton Rapids, Knight followed her parents to Washington state, settling in Shelton in 1890. She became a pioneer educator of the city. She left Shelton for five years to live and teach in Whatcom (now Bellingham), but returned to Shelton.

Over the years, Knight gained respect and popularity as an educator, and in 1900, became a nominee for the position of Mason County Superintendent of Schools as a part of the Democratic ticket. After a Democratic win, she was appointed to the position.

Knight served as County Superintendent of Schools for eighteen years. During her term, she consolidated five small school districts in western Mason County. The consolidation was completed in 1924 and offered students more educational opportunities than five separate school districts had. The newly formed district was later named in Knight's honor: Mary M. Knight School District No. 311.

Among Knight's other duties was improving communication between state educators. In 1909, partnering with the Thurston County Superintendent, Knight helped conduct the joint teachers organization meeting in Olympia. The meeting took place at Winlock Miller High School and was attended by over 100 teachers.

Over the years, Knight was known as "a pioneer Mason County educator." Her experience in education was judged "exceptional," she was called "an excellent official in all respects," and during the Mason County inspection in 1910, she was termed a "capable and efficient" specialist who "perfectly kept accounts and records."

=== Life in retirement and honors ===
Knight retired in 1921. In later years, she was the keeper of several Washington historic relics that belonged to the family of Major General of the Confederate States Army George Pickett. These items were displayed in the Harry Hartman Gallery.

The Mary M. Knight High School in Matlock was named in Knight's honor.

== Personal life and family ==
Mary Dunbar married Marcus F. Knight, her schoolmate, a fellow educator, on June 29, 1876 in Eaton Rapids. Marcus worked in a number of states, was principal in Shelton city schools for two years, and served as the Mason County treasurer. In later years, Mary and Marcus lived in a family house in Shelton, Washington.

The Knights had two daughters, Jessie and Gyneth. Both daughters followed their parent's steps to become teachers. After years of teaching, Jessie Knight served as postmaster in Shelton for twenty years. She was appointed to the position by different American presidents. Gyneth became a member of the Red Cross and went to Siberia during the World War I. Later, she lived in Shanghai, China.

== Death ==
Knight died on February 2, 1940 in Seattle after a long illness.

Knight's funeral was held in the Masonic Temple organized by the Order of Eastern Star and Chapter B of Philanthropic Educational Organization. The funeral was attended by many people, including students of the Mary M. Knight High School.

Knight was buried near her husband, who died in 1921, in the Masonic division of the Shelton Memorial Park.

== See also ==
- C. V. Dunbar
- Shelton, Washington
- Matlock, Washington

== Literature cited ==
- "Our founder, Mary M. Knight", marymknight.com, Elma: Mary M. Knight School District 311
- "Mr. and Mrs. Charles S. Dunbar", Seattle Post-Intelligencer, Seattle: Leigh S. J. Hunt, p. 9, November 10, 1903, ISSN 2379-7304, LCCN sn83045604, OCLC 9563195
- Blethen, Alden J., ed. (August 30, 1909), "Teachers meet at Olympia", Seattle Daily Times, Seattle: The Seattle Times Company, p. 1, ISSN 2639-4898, LCCN sn86072007, OCLC 1765328
- Blethen, Alden J., ed. (August 15, 1910), "Mason County probe finished by bureau", Seattle Daily Times, Seattle: The Seattle Times Company, p. 9, ISSN 2639-4898, LCCN sn86072007, OCLC 1765328
- "Noted relics of state story will be shown", Seattle Daily Times, Seattle: The Seattle Times Company, p. 9, April 25, 1937, ISSN 2639-4898, LCCN sn86072007, OCLC 1765328
- "Mrs. Mary Knight", Seattle Daily Times, Seattle: The Seattle Times Company, p. 7, February 3, 1940, ISSN 2639-4898, LCCN sn86072007, OCLC 1765328
- Flores, Michele Matassa, ed. (February 6, 1940), "Mrs. Mary M. Knight funeral", Seattle Daily Times, Seattle: The Seattle Times Company, p. 16, ISSN 2639-4898, LCCN sn86072007, OCLC 1765328
- Angle, Grant C., ed. (February 6, 1940), "Death takes Mary Knight, pioneer here", Shelton-Mason County Journal, vol. LIV, no. 11, Shelton: Journal Publishing Company, p. 1, ISSN 2471-2043, LCCN sn88085082, OCLC 17319687
- Pollard, Lancaster (1937), Spencer, Lloyd (ed.), A History of the State of Washington, vol. IV, New York: American Historical Society, pp. 472–473, LCCN 38011577, OCLC 877187
- Prosser, William Farrand (1903), Lewis, Edward Gardner (ed.), A history of the Puget Sound country, its resources, its commerce and its people, New York City: Edward Gardner Lewis, LCCN 05013767
