= Cyrus Dunbar =

Washington State pioneer (1856–1920)

Cyrus Vader Dunbar
- Born: June 15, 1856; Eaton Rapids, Michigan, US (Note: Eaton Rapids, Michigan, is stated as the place of birth in a book printed during Dunbar's life. At the time of his death, two obituaries stated he was born in Columbus, Michigan, possibly erroneously, because his elder sister Mary M. Knight, born in 1854, in Ingham county, lived and went to school in Eaton Rapids at the time of Dunbar's birth.)
- Died: July 25, 1920 (aged 64); Los Angeles, California, US
- Burial place: Hollywood Forever Cemetery
- Occupations: Pharmacist; Shelton Justice of the Peace; Shelton town clerk
- Years active: 1882–1913
- Organizations: Ancient Order of United Workmen; Knights of Pythias
- Known for: pioneer pharmacist of Shelton, Washington
- Political party: Republican
- Spouse: Sarah Ann Laverock (married 1877)
- Children: 1
- Relatives: Mary M. Knight (sister)

Cyrus Vader Dunbar (June 15, 1856 – July 25, 1920) was a Washington State pioneer and pharmacist in Shelton, Washington. Dunbar started working in pharmacology in 1882 in Portland, Oregon. In 1888, he moved to Shelton and opened his own drug store. He operated his business from different buildings, including one his family built. In the early 20th century, Dunbar was still considered the leading pharmacist of Shelton. He developed his product range to include stationery, novels, periodicals, and household items. He retired in 1913 after his store was destroyed in a fire.

Besides his business, Dunbar actively participated in the life of the city, for a period of time serving as a Justice of the Peace and town clerk. Dunbar was a member of the Ancient Order of United Workmen, the Knights of Pythias fraternity, and the Shelton music band, which consisted of his brothers.

== Early life, family and education ==
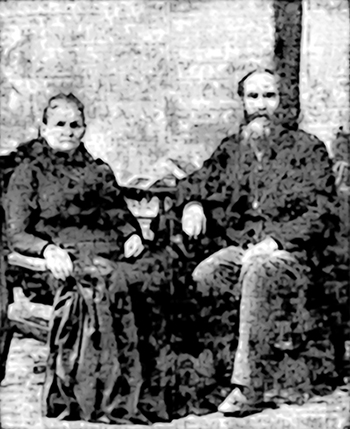
Mr. and Mrs. Charles S. Dunbar

Dunbar was born on June 15, 1856, in Eaton Rapids, Michigan. His distant ancestors came to America from Scotland and settled in southern Michigan. He was the son of Charles S. Dunbar, a blacksmith farmer, and Union Army soldier, and of Orphia S. Dunbar (Norton). The parents had seven children.

Charles and Orphia moved from Michigan to Dakota, and in 1883 came as pioneers to Washington State. Five of the Dunbar children later joined their parents and lived on the Pacific coast: Cyrus V. Dunbar; William H. Dunbar, a Seattle expert accountant; Hiram N. Dunbar, a blacksmith of Shelton, Washington; E. Prentis Dunbar, who worked in the paint and wallpaper business in Bremerton, Washington; and Mary Miranda Dunbar (Knight), a Mason County Superintendent of Schools.

Dunbar went to school and learned pharmacology in Eaton Rapids.

== Career ==
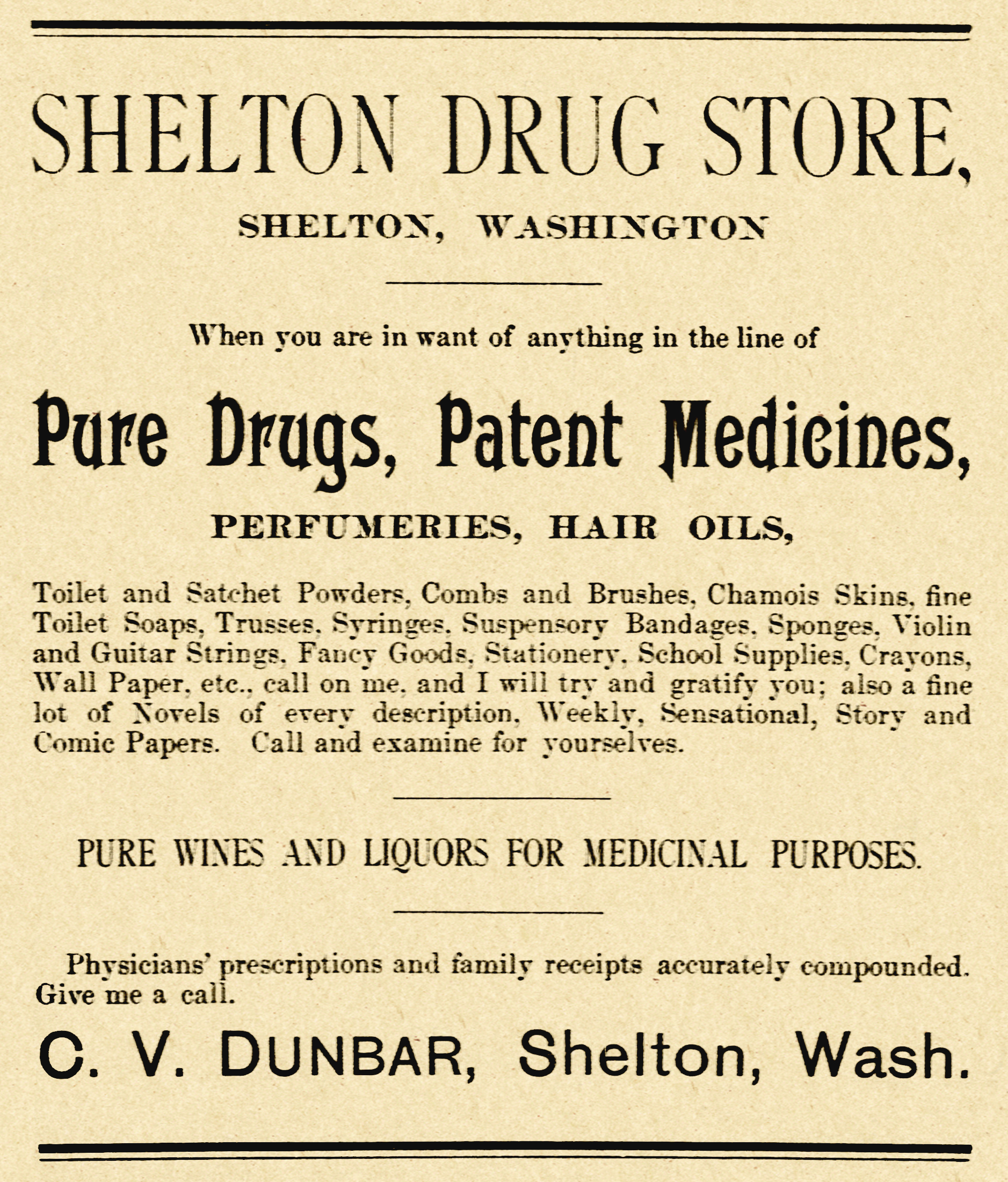
Shelton Drug Store advertisement, Mason County Journal, 1890

Dunbar's career started in 1882 in Portland, Oregon, where he worked as a pharmacist. He worked in the business with his brother Hiram until 1888. That year they moved to Shelton, Washington, where some of the Dunbar family members had already settled.

Dunbar was known as one of the pioneers of Shelton. The Dunbar family erected a building on the 4th Street, which was in the woods at the time. Dunbar lived and opened his drug store there, and later moved his business to a building on the 2nd Street. By 1889, Dunbar expanded his range of products to include candy, stationery, small household items, tools, novels, and periodicals. Dunbar tried to keep his store open every day, including weekends, but had problems with the authorities because at the time, the Sunday law required all the stores to be closed on Sundays for religious or secular reasons.

Over the years, Dunbar gained recognition as the "leading druggist" of Shelton and a "substantial citizen" of the city. He worked in the business until 1913, when the store was destroyed in a fire. Dunbar sold what he had left and moved with his family to Los Angeles, California.

=== Other positions ===
For a period of time, Dunbar served as a Justice of the Peace and town clerk in Shelton.

== Memberships ==
Dunbar was a member of the Ancient Order of United Workmen and Knights of Pythias fraternities. He actively supported and participated in both orders. In 1914, he was among the delegates to the grand lodge convention of the Knights of Pythias.

Over the years, he was a member of a Shelton music band with three of his brothers. He played the cornet.

== Personal life ==
On December 25, 1877, Dunbar married Sarah Ann Laverock from New York. The family lived in Portland, Oregon, and later in Shelton. In 1913, they moved to Los Angeles. They had a daughter, Cecil, who followed her father's footsteps to become a pharmacist. She graduated from the University of Michigan pharmacy department in Ann Arbor.

Politically, Dunbar supported the Republican party.

By 1913, Dunbar had developed health problems. He died on July 25, 1920, in Los Angeles, California, and was buried in the Hollywood Forever Cemetery.

== See also ==
- Mary M. Knight
- Shelton, Washington
- Eaton Rapids, Michigan

== Literature cited ==
- Angle, Grant C., ed. (November 8, 1889), "Local and County News", Mason County Journal, Shelton: Journal Pub. Co., p. 5, ISSN 2471-2043, LCCN sn88085081, OCLC 17319674
- Angle, Grant C., ed. (November 18, 1898), "In Superior Court", Mason County Journal, Shelton: Journal Pub. Co., p. 3, ISSN 2471-2043, LCCN sn88085081, OCLC 17319674
- "Mr. and Mrs. Charles S. Dunbar", Seattle Post-Intelligencer, Seattle: Leigh S. J. Hunt, p. 9, November 10, 1903, ISSN 2379-7304, LCCN sn83045604, OCLC 9563195
- "At the city hotels", The Spokesman-Review, Spokane: Cowles Company, p. 7, May 20, 1914, ISSN 1064-7317, LCCN sn84024754, OCLC 11102610
- "The passing of the pioneers", The Spokesman-Review, Spokane: Cowles Company, p. 6, August 6, 1920, ISSN 1064-7317, LCCN sn84024754, OCLC 11102610
- "Los Angeles Items", N.A.R.D. Journal, vol. XXXI, no. 1, Chicago: National Association of Retail Druggists, p. 28, October 7, 1920, ISSN 0027-5972, LCCN 12025705, OCLC 1695474
- Prosser, William Farrand (1903), Lewis, Edward Gardner (ed.), A history of the Puget Sound country, its resources, its commerce and its people, New York City: Edward Gardner Lewis, LCCN 05013767
