= Needham (surname) =

Needham is an English surname. Notable people with the surname include:

- Alicia Adélaide Needham (1863–1945), Irish composer
- Arthur Needham (1859–1915), Washington State pioneer
- Ben Needham, British infant missing since 1991
- Col Needham, co-founder of the Internet Movie Database
- David Needham, English football player
- Elizabeth Needham, English procuress and brothel-keeper of 18th-century London
- Ernest Needham (1873–1936), English football player
- Francis Needham, 3rd Earl of Kilmorey (1842–1915), 3rd Earl of Kilmorey
- Sir Frederick Needham (1835–1924), English physician
- George Needham (teacher) (1804 –1894), Australian teacher
- Hal Needham, American stuntman
- Henry Beach Needham (1871–1915), American journalist
- Jack Needham, English football player
- James Needham (mycologist) (1849–1913), English mycologist
- James George Needham (1868–1957), American entomologist
- Jimmy Needham (born 1985), American contemporary Christian singer songwriter and musician
- John Needham (1713–1781), British biologist and Roman Catholic priest who believed in the theory of spontaneous generation
- Joseph Needham (1900–1995), British biochemist, historian of science and sinologist
- Joseph Needham (cricketer) (1862–1889), English cricketer
- Joseph Needham (politician) (1876–1953), English-born Saskatchewan politician, clergyman and public administrator
- Marchamont Needham (1620–1678), English journalist, publisher and political pamphleteer
- Nik Needham (born 1996), American football player
- Philip Deans Needham (1942–2025), Kentucky Horse Breeder, Mine That Bird (2009 Derby Winner)
- Richard Needham, 6th Earl of Kilmorey (born 1942), British politician
- Richard J. Needham (1912–1996), Canadian newspaper columnist and humorist
- Rodney Needham (1923–2006), British social anthropologist
- Roger Needham, British computer scientist
- Samuel Needham VC, British soldier
- Tom Needham, Irish baseball player
- Tracey Needham, American actress
- Tristan Needham, British mathematician
- Violet Needham, British author
