= Raúl Allegre =

American football player (born 1959)

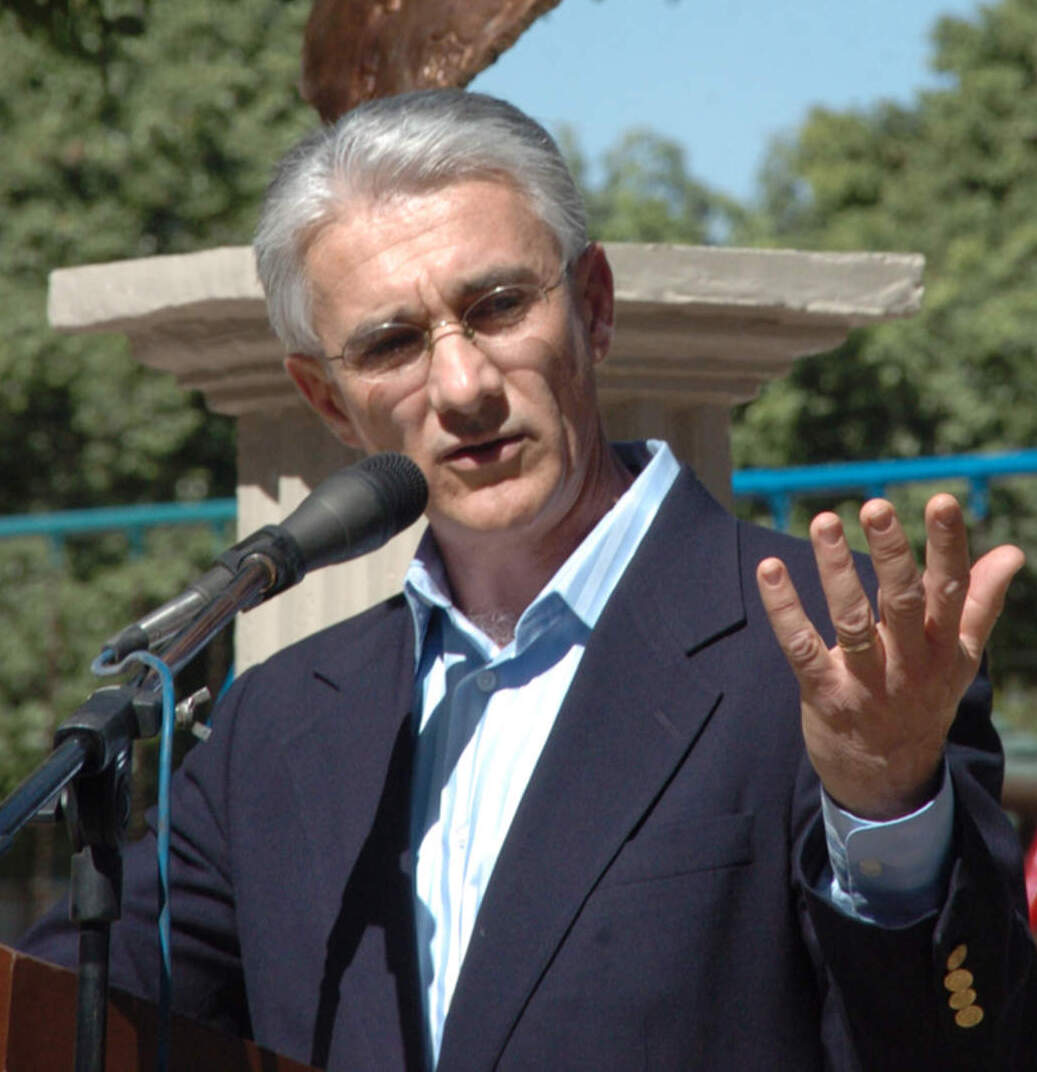
- Allegre in 2019

No. 2
- Position: Kicker

Personal information
- Born: June 15, 1959 (age 67); Torreón, Coahuila, Mexico
- Listed height: 5 ft 10 in (1.78 m)
- Listed weight: 167 lb (76 kg)

Career information
- High school: Shelton (Shelton, Washington, U.S.)
- College: Montana (1978–1979); Texas (1980–1982)
- NFL draft: 1983: undrafted

Career history
- Dallas Cowboys (1983)*; Baltimore / Indianapolis Colts (1983–1985); New York Giants (1986–1991); Houston Oilers (1991)*; New York Jets (1991)
- * Offseason or practice squad member only

Awards and highlights
- 2× Super Bowl champion (XXI, XXV); Second-team All-Pro (1983)

Career NFL statistics
- Field goals made: 137
- Field goals attempted: 186
- Field goal percentage: 73.7%
- Points scored: 594
- Longest field goal: 55
- Stats at Pro Football Reference

Raúl Enrique Allegre Rodríguez (born June 15, 1959) is a Mexican former professional American football kicker in the National Football League (NFL) for the Baltimore / Indianapolis Colts, New York Giants, and New York Jets. He played college football at Montana and Texas and was signed by the Dallas Cowboys as an undrafted free agent after the 1983 NFL draft.

== Early life ==
Allegre began playing football in 1977, while attending Shelton High School as an exchange student. Originally a soccer player, he had never played American football before his senior season at Shelton. Head coach Jack Stark asked him to try kicking footballs one day before the season began. He had great distance, but each ball went below the crossbar. Coach Stark asked him if he could kick it above the crossbar and Allegre remarked that he could, but thought it was like a soccer goal and was aiming below.

He was named the starter at kicker to handle field goals, extra points and kickoffs. The team only won 3 games during the season and Allegre only had a chance to kick 3 field goal attempts and 9 extra point attempts, although he regularly kicked off with great distance.

== College career ==
Because he did not get much exposure, Stark filmed him kicking from long distance and sent the tape to different colleges. He received interest from the University of Montana, who initially offered a partial football scholarship, that did not include expenses for lodging, books and meals. Allegre declined the offer and the school countered with a full scholarship, although it didn't have an engineering program as he wanted.

After two years, he opted to transfer to the University of Texas at Austin because of its reputation in engineering.

In 1980, Allegre walked-on to the football team and was redshirted because of the NCAA transfer rules. During that time, he handled the scout team kicking duties. In the fall semester he was given a full football scholarship.

In 1981, he was named the starting kicker. He finished his last 2 seasons with 27 out of 45 field goals (.600), 66 out of 68 extra points (.970) and 147 total points. He earned an undergraduate degree with honors in civil engineering.

== Professional career ==
Allegre was signed as an undrafted free agent by the Dallas Cowboys after the 1983 NFL draft, where he had to go through a try out session. On August 23, he was traded to the Baltimore Colts, in exchange for a ninth round draft choice (#232-John Hunt).

As a rookie, he made 30 field goals (franchise record) out of 35 attempts and 22 out of 24 extra points, for an 85.7% average (franchise record) and a total of 112 points (franchise record). He tied a franchise record by making 5 field goals against the Philadelphia Eagles.

In 1984, he missed 3 preseason games with a bruised heel. He injured a hamstring in the season opener and missed the next 4 contests, only appearing in 12 games. Dean Biasucci replaced him from the second to the sixth game and would remain as a kickoff specialist for the rest of the season. Allegre did not make a field goal until the eighth game against the Pittsburgh Steelers. He connected on 11-for-18 field goal attempts (61.1%) and had a perfect 14-for-14 on extra point attempts.

In 1985, he made 16-of 26 field goal attempts, for a low 61.5% average and was 36-of-39 on extra points. On September 4, 1986, he was waived by the then Indianapolis Colts, after Biasucci passed him on the depth chart.

In 1986, after New York Giants' kicker Ali Haji-Sheikh was injured, the team began auditions to find a replacement. Allegre's two-week tryout was successful, kicking a 57-yard field goal that convinced Coach Bill Parcells to sign him. Because Allegre decided to call his agent before signing the contract, Parcells decided to cancel the deal, signing instead Joe Cooper. After three ineffective performances by Cooper, Parcells called Allegre back and signed him on September 25, becoming the team's sixth kicker in 19 games. During the team's Super Bowl run in 1986, he kicked game-winning field goals in consecutive weeks in a crucial mid-season stretch. Allegre kicked the opening kickoff of Super Bowl XXI, with the announcer stating that "Raúl Allegre, will kick off, number 2" just before the contest began.

In 1990, he began the season as the starting kicker, before suffering an injury and clearing the way for Matt Bahr. He also did not kick in Super Bowl XXV after being replaced by Bahr in late September.

On May 22, 1991, he was released in favor of Bahr. On August 8, he signed as a free agent with the Houston Oilers. He missed a field goal against the Atlanta Falcons in preseason, before losing the position battle to Ian Howfield and being released on August 19. On October 24, he was re-signed by the Giants after Bahr suffered a thigh injury. He was cut on November 30. At the time he ranked ninth on the franchise's All-time scoring list, having made 77 out of 103 (74.8%) field goals.

On December 16, 1991, he was signed by the New York Jets to replace an injured Pat Leahy who suffered from sciatica, causing him pain in the back, hip and upper leg which would lead to Leahy's retirement. In the season finale at Miami, Allegre tied the score in the waning moments and later won the game 23–20 and a playoff berth for the Jets in an overtime thriller. He also kicked in the playoff loss against the Houston Oilers.

Allegre lost the competition for the kicker's spot on the Jets roster in training camp to Plan B free agency addition Jason Staurovsky and was released on August 28, 1992. He later decided to retire due to a back injury.

During his nine professional seasons, Allegre made 137 field goals in 186 attempts, scored 183 extra points for 594 points and didn't have any attempt blocked.

== Personal life ==
After retiring, Allegre planned to go back to the University of Texas to obtain an MBA degree. He was contacted by NFL Films to participate in a Spanish-language show, oriented to test the Latin American market.

Allegre was later offered a position for a Dallas Cowboys pre-game show, and later eventually leading to his current work as color commentator for Monday Night Football with Álvaro Martín for ESPN in Latin America. He also appears on NFL32 and contributes to other ESPN programs.

== Career regular season statistics ==
Career high/best bold

Season	Team	G	FGM	FGA	%	LNG	XPM	XPA	%	PTS
1983	BAL	16	30	35	85.7	55	22	24	91.7	112
1984	IND	12	11	18	61.1	54	14	14	100.0	35
1985	IND	16	16	26	61.5	41	36	39	92.3	84
1986	NYG	13	24	32	75.0	46	33	33	100.0	105
1987	NYG	12	17	27	63.0	53	25	26	96.2	76
1988	NYG	6	10	11	90.9	48	14	14	100.0	44
1989	NYG	10	20	26	76.9	52	23	24	95.8	83
1990	NYG	3	4	5	80.0	46	9	9	100.0	21
1991	NYG	3	2	2	100.0	36	5	5	100.0	11
1991	NYJ	1	3	4	75.0	44	2	2	100.0	14
Career		92	137	186	73.7	55	183	190	96.3	594

== See also ==
- History of the New York Giants (1979–93)
