= Caleb Schlauderaff =

American football player (born 1987)

No. 72
- Positions: Guard, center

Personal information
- Born: November 7, 1987 (age 38); Shelton, Washington, U.S.
- Listed height: 6 ft 4 in (1.93 m)
- Listed weight: 302 lb (137 kg)

Career information
- High school: Shelton
- College: Utah
- NFL draft: 2011: 6th round, 179th overall pick

Career history
- Green Bay Packers (2011)*; New York Jets (2011–2013)
- * Offseason or practice squad member only

Awards and highlights
- Second-team All-American (2010); First-team All-MW (2010); Second-team All-MW (2009)

Career NFL statistics
- Games played: 12
- Games started: 1
- Stats at Pro Football Reference

Caleb Hunter Schlauderaff (born November 7, 1987) is an American former professional football player who was a guard and center in the National Football League (NFL). He played college football for the Utah Utes and was selected by the Green Bay Packers in the sixth round of the 2011 NFL draft.

== Professional career ==
Pre-draft measurables
Height	Weight	Arm length	Hand span	Wingspan	20-yard shuttle	Vertical jump	Broad jump
6 ft 4 1/4 in (1.94 m)	305 lb (138 kg)	32 1/4 in (0.82 m)	9 3/4 in (0.25 m)	6 ft 3 3/4 in (1.92 m)	4.81 s	28.0 in (0.71 m)	8 ft 6 in (2.59 m)
All values from NFL Combine/Pro Day

=== Green Bay Packers ===
Schlauderaff was selected by the Green Bay Packers in the 6th round (179th overall) of the 2011 NFL draft.

=== New York Jets ===
The Packers traded Schlauderaff to the New York Jets on September 3, 2011, for an undisclosed draft pick. He was released on August 30, 2014.
