= Shelton High School (Washington) =

Coordinates: 47°14′12″N 123°07′25″W

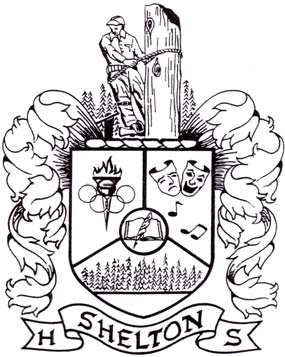

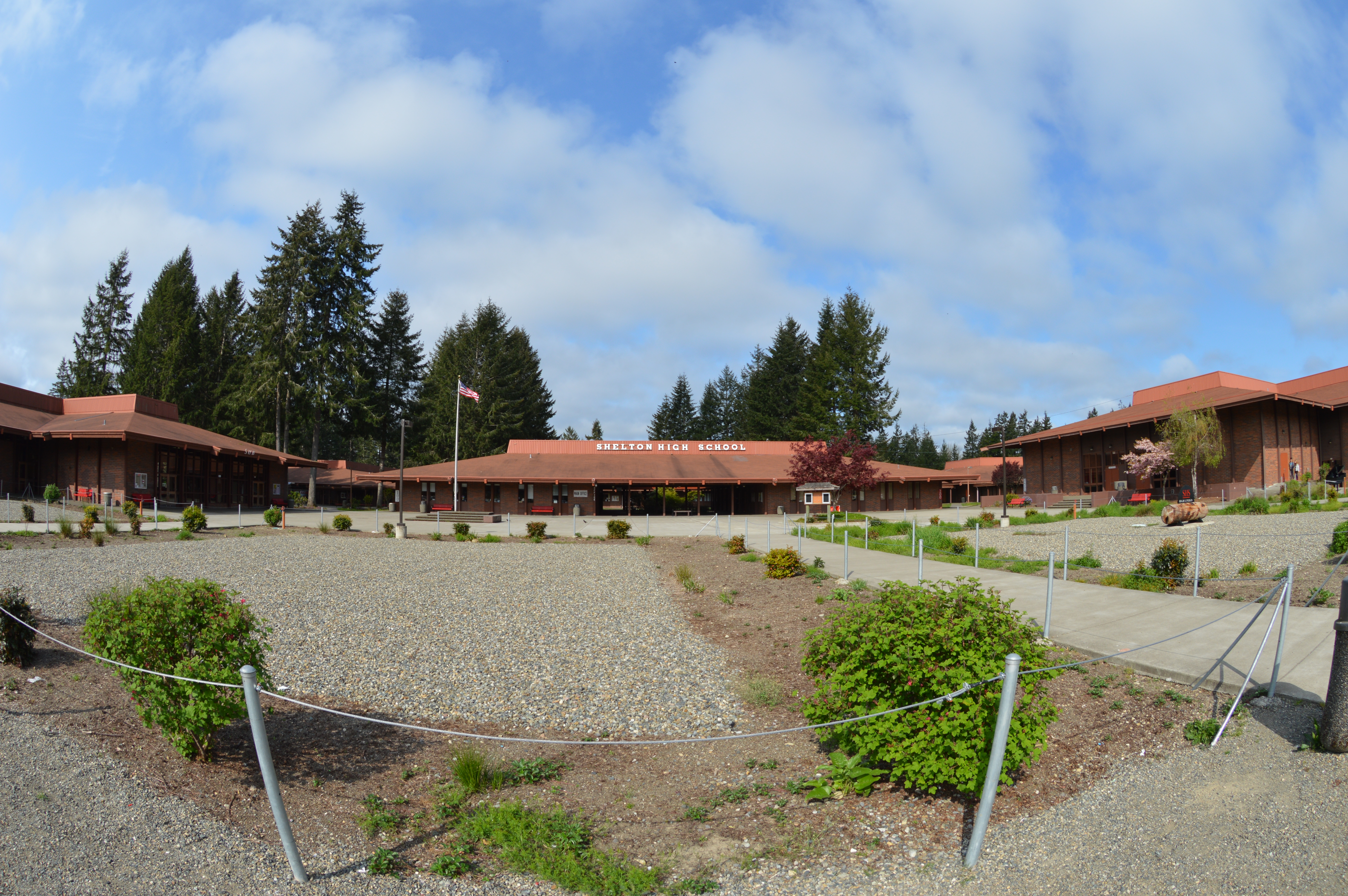
- Campus entrance as of Spring 2015
- 3737 Shelton Springs Rd; Shelton, Washington; United States

Information
- Type: High School
- Established: 1975
- School district: Shelton School District
- Principal: Bruce Kipper
- Teaching staff: 77.78 (FTE)
- Grades: 9-12
- Enrollment: 1,687 (2022-2023)
- Student to teacher ratio: 18.49
- Campus type: Urban
- Colors: Red & Black
- Athletics: WIAA Class 3A, West Central District III
- Athletics conference: Evergreen Conference 2A/3A; Greater St. Helens 3A (football only)
- Mascot: Highclimbers
- Rival: North Mason High School; Capital High School
- Yearbook: Saghalie
- Website: shs.sheltonschools.org

Shelton High School is a public 9-12 high school located in Shelton, Washington, and part of the Shelton School District. Shelton High School is a class 3A high school and was restructured starting with the 2004–2005 school year to be a Grade 10-12 High School. More than 1600 students, grades 9–12, are enrolled at SHS. Built in 1975, it replaced Irene S. Reed High School, Shelton's first high school.

== Sports ==
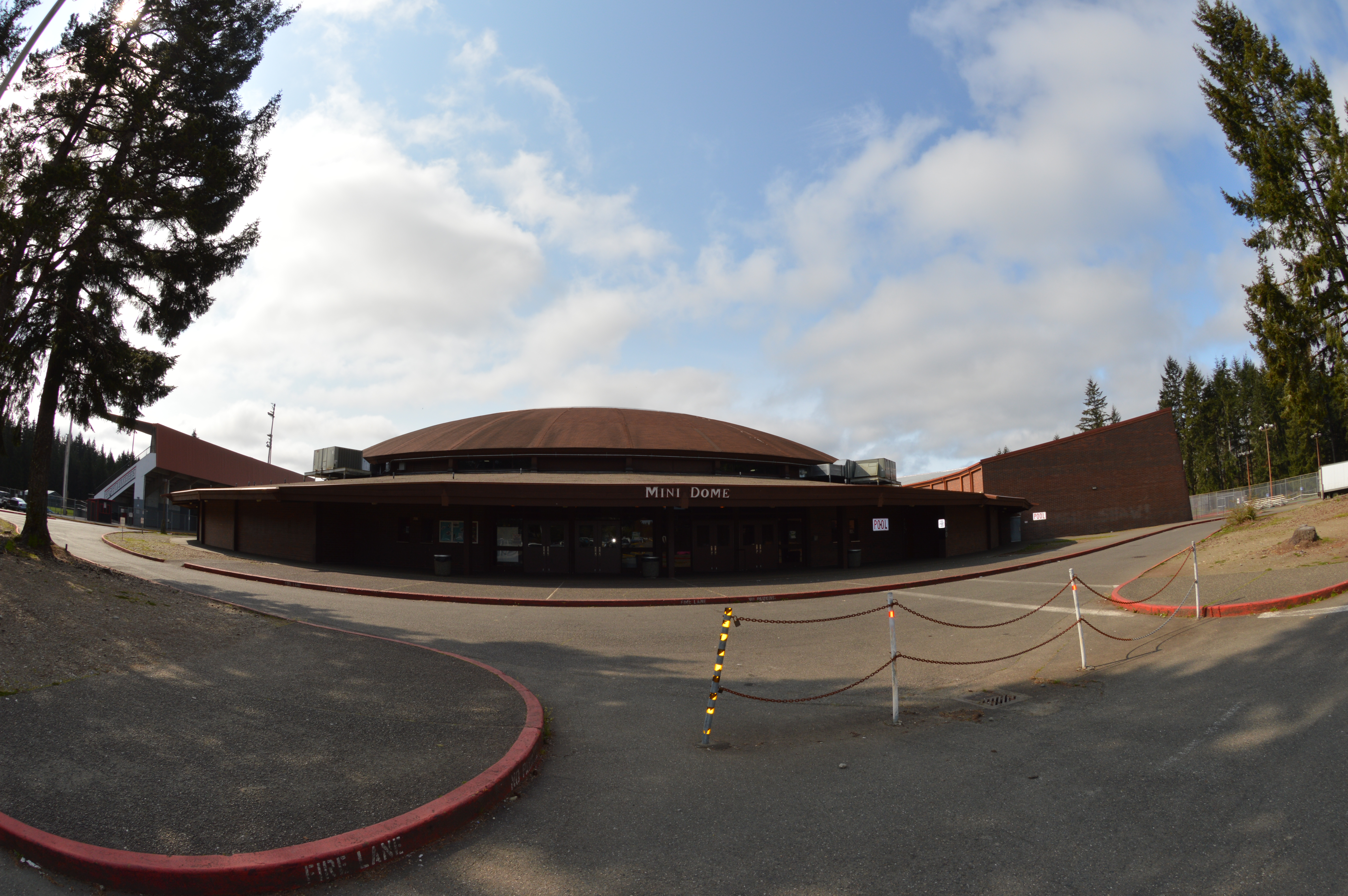
Shelton High School's gymnasium and pool.

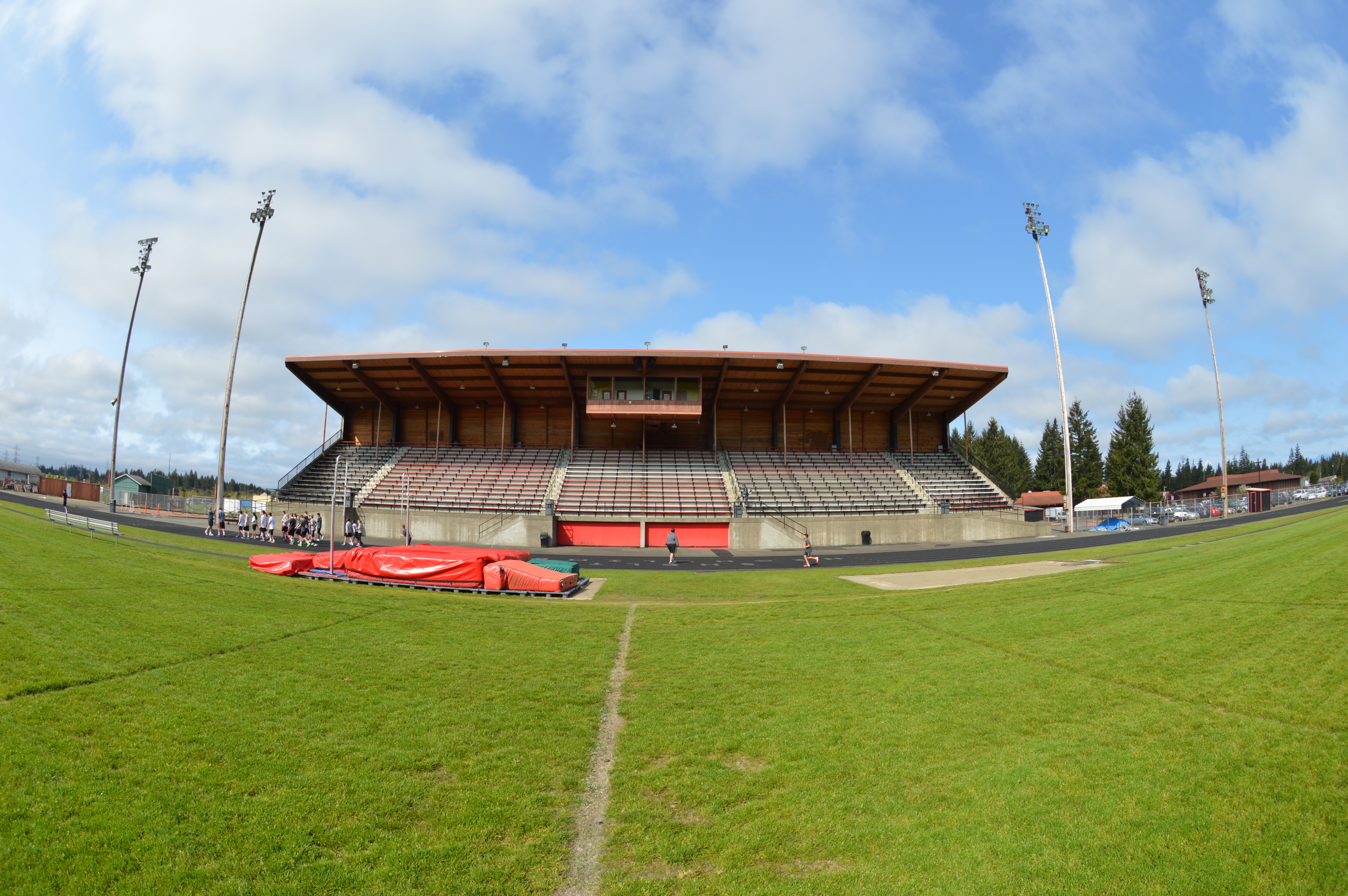
Shelton football, soccer, and track are held at the stadium.

Shelton High School is a 3A division member of the Washington Interscholastic Activities Association. SHS offers a variety of sports. The fall includes cross country, football, girls' soccer, boys' tennis, and girls' swimming. The winter includes boys' basketball, girls' basketball, girls' bowling, boys' swimming, and wrestling. Spring sports include baseball, fastpitch, golf, boys' soccer, girls' tennis, and track and field. Rugby is also another popular sport but it is not associated at the school.
On June 26, 2018, the Shelton School Board unanimously voted to name the football/soccer field after longtime head football coach, Jack Stark. Coach Stark walked the Climber sidelines for 25 years, leading the Climbers to state championships in 1974 and 1985. Jack Stark Field at Highclimber Stadium was dedicated on August 31, 2018, when the Climbers hosted the North Mason Bulldogs in the annual, Mason County Cup.

=== Soccer ===
Brian Fairbrother founded the boys' soccer program in 1981 and the girls' program in 1985. Initially, Shelton played in the Black Hills League with a junior varsity level team. In 1994, the Shelton boys' team won their first Black Hills League championship with a 13-2-1 record. Shelton were co-league champs in 1998 with the best record (15-2-1) in the school's history. Shelton's boys' team also won league titles in 2000 and 2001. Fairbrother retired as head coach of the girls' program in 1999 (91-110-22) and the boys' in 2007 (222-158-42).

State Championships
Season	Sport	Number of Championships	Year
Fall	Football	2	1974, 1985
Winter	Basketball, boys'	1	1976
Winter	Bowling, girls'	1	2007
Spring	Slowpitch Softball, Girls'	1	1989
Total		5	

State Championships: Football - 1975, 1985 Boys' Basketball - 1977

SHS Marching Band:

Yakima Sweepstakes Winners - 2008

=== Shelton Invite ===
The Shelton Invite is an annual track and field invitational meet held at Highclimber Stadium. Created in 1960, it is the longest running track invitational in the nation. It was formed when the Centralia Relays meet (1930's to 1950's) ceased to exist, leaving the Western Washington region with no multi-team meets. Multi-team meets are created so coaches can challenge their top athletes with other top athletes from different schools. It was Aberdeen High School who won four of the first five Shelton Invites. As the years went by, the invite saw up to 30 schools signed up per year. Sixteen years later, Shelton was seeing over 50 schools per year. By the 1980s, multi-meets became more and more popular and started taking its toll on Shelton's entry list. In 1999, the Shelton Invite organizer's began an effort to regain the meets status that it once had. The "new" Shelton Invite gathers the top sixteen athletes in Washington State high schools for each event. 2013 had a record number of 62 teams enter with their best athletes. The Shelton invite is considered Washington's #1 Elite track and field meet and one of the hardest to qualify for.

== Pool closure ==
The school district has been struggling with balancing funds available and increasing needs of the student population. On February 10, 2015 the school board voted to not close the pool because unfunded basic education needs and deferred maintenance for other facilities could not be fully funded. Deferred maintenance for the district is estimated to be more than $3 million. Based on the recommendation of the superintendent, the school board agreed that the swimming pool was a community asset and should not be funded by the school district alone. The school board voted 4-1 that the pool be shut down on July 1, 2015. The pool is home to the Shelton Swim Teams and where third graders receive water safety training. While agreements are not finalized, most likely the swim teams will practice and compete at The Evergreen State College Aquatic Center located about 25 miles from Shelton or the Squaxin Island Tribal Aquatic Center about seven miles from the Shelton High School. Using the ORB study conducted in March 2014 the superintended stated that the pool is in need of $2.5 million in repairs which is an amount the school district simply cannot afford. Repurposing of the closed pool facility has not been finalized as of March 25, 2015. On May 30, 2015, Mason General Hospital made a joint operation to keep the pool funded and open.

After a bond passed on February 14, 2017 the pool was remodeled as part of improvements done to athletics facilities.

== Notable alumni ==
- Raul Allegre, Former NFL placekicker (New York Giants)
- Justin Ena, Former College (BYU) and NFL player (Philadelphia Eagles, Tennessee Titans), College FB Coach (SUU, Weber State, Utah, Dixie State, San Diego State, BYU)
- Douglas Long, Former NFL player (Seattle Seahawks)
- Wes Stock, Former MLB player (Baltimore Orioles, Kansas City Athletics)
- Caleb Schlauderaff, NFL player (Green Bay Packers, New York Jets)
