= Matlock, Washington =

Unincorporated community in Washington, United States

Matlock
- Unincorporated community
- Location within Washington (state) Location within the United States
- Coordinates: 47°14′16″N 123°24′29″W
- Country: United States
- State: Washington
- County: Mason

Area
  - Total: 21.6615 sq mi (56.103 km^{2})
  - Land: 21.6557 sq mi (56.088 km^{2})
  - Water: 0.0058 sq mi (0.015 km^{2})
- Elevation: 456 ft (139 m)

Population (2023)
  - Total: 98
- Time zone: UTC-8 (Pacific (PST))
  - Summer (DST): UTC-7 (PDT)
- ZIP Code: 98560
- Area code(s): 360, 564
- GNIS feature ID: 1522803

Matlock is an unincorporated community in Mason County, Washington, United States. Matlock is the primary population center for the western part of Mason County, a sporadically populated logging area. The most notable sites are the church, food bank, general store, post office, local grange hall, and the Mary M. Knight school, grades kindergarten through senior high school.

Matlock features nearby lakes and recreational opportunities, including fishing, hiking, hunting, and horseback riding. The nearest lake to Matlock is Lake Nahwatzel. Every year during the first full weekend in May, Matlock hosts the Old Timers' Fair at Mary M. Knight School campus. The fair features food, crafts and tractors. Matlock is located northwest of Olympia, Washington, about a 20-minute drive from the county seat, Shelton. Matlock is a secluded little town just outside of Shelton and Elma. Matlock is also home to Mason County Fire District 12.

== Climate ==
Matlock has high annual precipitation 87 inches (220 cm) due to strong influence from the nearby Pacific. A significant drying trend occurs in summer, giving Matlock a warm-summer Mediterranean climate (Csb) according to the Köppen climate classification system.

Climate data for Matlock
Month	Jan	Feb	Mar	Apr	May	Jun	Jul	Aug	Sep	Oct	Nov	Dec	Year
Record high °F (°C)	57 (14)	60 (16)	61 (16)	77 (25)	89 (32)	84 (29)	89 (32)	97 (36)	92 (33)	76 (24)	58 (14)	55 (13)	97 (36)
Mean daily maximum °F (°C)	45.4 (7.4)	47.1 (8.4)	49.7 (9.8)	55.4 (13.0)	63 (17)	67.3 (19.6)	73.6 (23.1)	77.3 (25.2)	74.6 (23.7)	59.3 (15.2)	49.2 (9.6)	44.5 (6.9)	58.9 (14.9)
Mean daily minimum °F (°C)	33 (1)	33 (1)	35.7 (2.1)	36.8 (2.7)	40.8 (4.9)	46.7 (8.2)	50.2 (10.1)	50 (10)	45 (7)	41.5 (5.3)	32.7 (0.4)	32 (0)	39.8 (4.3)
Record low °F (°C)	21 (−6)	18 (−8)	21 (−6)	27 (−3)	30 (−1)	37 (3)	40 (4)	38 (3)	32 (0)	28 (−2)	23 (−5)	21 (−6)	18 (−8)
Average precipitation inches (mm)	14.39 (366)	8.78 (223)	9.75 (248)	6.43 (163)	4.3 (110)	2.49 (63)	1.27 (32)	1.61 (41)	2.61 (66)	8.37 (213)	13.96 (355)	13.04 (331)	87 (2,200)
Average snowfall inches (cm)	1.4 (3.6)	1 (2.5)	0.5 (1.3)	0 (0)	0 (0)	0 (0)	0 (0)	0 (0)	0 (0)	0 (0)	0.8 (2.0)	0.1 (0.25)	3.7 (9.4)
Average precipitation days	22	17	21	18	14	12	7	7	9	16	21	21	185
