= Justin Ena =

American football player and coach (born 1977)

BYU Cougars
- Title: Special Teams Coordinator

Personal information
- Born: November 20, 1977 (age 48); Provo, Utah, U.S.

Career information
- High school: Shelton (Shelton, Washington)
- College: BYU
- NFL draft: 2002: undrafted

Career history

Playing
- Philadelphia Eagles (2002–2003); Tennessee Titans (2004); Philadelphia Eagles (2005)

Coaching
- Southern Utah (2008–2009) Special teams coordinator; Southern Utah (2010–2013) Defensive coordinator & linebackers coach; Weber State (2014) Defensive coordinator & linebackers coach; Utah (2015) Linebackers coach; Utah (2016–2018) Co-special teams coordinator & linebackers coach; Utah State (2019) Defensive coordinator & inside linebackers coach; Utah State (2020) Inside linebackers coach; Dixie State (2021) Defensive coordinator & safeties coach; San Diego State (2022) Defensive line coach; BYU (2023–2025) Linebackers coach; BYU (2026–present) Special teams coordinator

Awards and highlights
- As player: 2× First-team All-MW (2000, 2001); Second-team All-MW (1999)

Career NFL statistics
- Total tackles: 59
- Pass deflections: 1
- Stats at Pro Football Reference

Justin Peato Ena (born November 20, 1977) is an American football coach and former linebacker who is currently the special teams coordinator at Brigham Young University football. He played college football at BYU and in the National Football League (NFL) for the Philadelphia Eagles and Tennessee Titans.

== Early life and college ==
Born in Provo, Utah, Ena grew up in Shelton, Washington and graduated from Shelton High School in 1996. Ena enrolled at Brigham Young University in the spring of 1997 and immediately joined the BYU Cougars football team as a linebacker, redshirting the 1997 season.

In his first season with BYU in 1998, Ena played in 11 games with 22 tackles and an interception. Then in 1999, Ena played in all 12 games with 49 tackles and a blocked kick. The Mountain West Conference (MWC) named Ena to its all-conference second-team that year. Moving from the strong side to inside to replace the NFL-bound Rob Morris, Ena had a breakthrough season in 2000, again starting all 12 games while leading the team with 107 tackles, in addition to three sacks, four pass deflections, one quarterback hurry, and three forced fumbles. He was a first-team All-MWC honoree in 2000. As a senior in 2001, Ena again led BYU in tackles with 101 and made the All-MWC first-team. Ena graduated from BYU in 2001 with a bachelor's degree in history.

== Pro football career ==
Following the 2002 NFL draft, Ena signed as an undrafted free agent with the Philadelphia Eagles on April 26, 2002. In the 2002 and 2003 seasons, Ena played in 25 regular season games primarily on special teams, with 18 tackles. Ena also appeared in four postseason games during those years, with three tackles.

After being waived by the Eagles, Ena signed with the Tennessee Titans on September 6, 2004. Playing in 16 games with five starts, Ena had 32 tackles, including four for loss, along with a pass defended.

On November 15, 2005, Ena returned to the Eagles. He appeared in six games with nine tackles.

== Coaching career ==
Ena began a coaching career in 2008 as special teams coordinator at Southern Utah under Ed Lamb. After two years coaching special teams, Ena became defensive coordinator and linebackers coach in 2010, during which Southern Utah won the Great West Conference title and had a top-25 defense in Division I FCS. The 2013 team had the second best defense in the Big Sky Conference.

In 2014, he was the defensive coordinator and linebackers coach at Weber State University under Jay Hill. Ena then spent four years at Utah under Kyle Whittingham, starting as the linebackers coach in 2015 before adding co-special teams coordinator to his duties in 2016.

In December 2018, Ena was hired by head coach Gary Andersen as defensive coordinator and inside linebackers coach at Utah State. Following the 2019 season, Ena was reassigned to inside linebackers coach. When Andersen resigned following the 2020 season, Ena was not retained by the new staff, instead joining the staff at Dixie State as the defensive coordinator and linebackers coach.

In February 2022, after one season at Dixie State, Ena joined Brady Hoke's staff at San Diego State as the defensive line coach.

On January 2, 2023, after one season at San Diego State, Ena joined Kalani Sitake's staff at Brigham Young University football as the defensive assistant coach over linebackers.

== Personal life ==
Ena is of Samoan descent. His father was a school principal. Ena's uncle Tali Ena played fullback at Washington State and was selected in the 11th round of the 1980 NFL draft by the Seattle Seahawks. Ena is married with two children.
