= Old Settler (sternwheeler) =

1878 steamboat in United States

History
- Name: Old Settler
- Completed: 1878
- Identification: US registry #19493
- Fate: Abandoned

General characteristics
- Type: Inland steamboat
- Length: 60 ft (18.29 m)
- Propulsion: sternwheel

Old Settler was a sternwheel steamboat that operated on Puget Sound from 1878 to 1895.

== Career ==
Old Settler was built at Olympia, Washington in 1878, and was said to have been “cheaply constructed” and “undersized”. The engines, boiler, and whistle were all second hand. The steam whistle had come from a much larger vessel, and blowing the whistle would cause a loss of power and a consequent rapid drop in speed due to the amount of steam expended for the blast. This defect allowed the very slow Capital to outrun Old Settler on a number of occasions.

Upon completion, Old Settler was placed on the run from the territorial capital, Olympia, to Shelton, Washington. The chief competition on this route at the time, at least in the same class of vessel as Old Settler was the steam scow Capital which was driven by an old threshing machine engine. The harbor at Olympia is deep enough now for ocean-going ships, but this is a result of dredging by the Corps of Engineers. In its natural state, the Olympia harbor was quite shallow, so shallow draft vessels such as Old Settler and Capital had an advantage over other vessels.

The boat's original owners ran into financial difficulties and the vessel passed into the hands of Struve, Haines & Leary, a Seattle law firm. The law firm then transferred the vessel to Capt. Simon H. Randolph (d. 1909). For a time Old Settler was operated as a tow boat. Captain Randolph had a reputation for frugality, but even he could not make Old Settler into a profitable vessel. At some point prior to 1895, the boat's machinery was removed and sold to a Seattle printer. The vessel then drifted under a pier in Seattle and sank.
