= Shelton School District =

School district in Mason County, Washington, United States

Shelton School District is located in the Pacific Northwest in the city of Shelton, Washington. It is the largest public school district in Mason County, Washington. The district provides services for over 4000 students in a K to 12 program. It has three K-4 elementary schools, one 5-6 middle school, one 7-8 junior high school, one 9-12 high school, an alternative middle/high school, and a project based learning high school.

Shelton School District is unique in that they have four feeder school districts. These feeder school districts do not have high schools in their school district. Students from Hood Canal and Southside all attend one of Shelton School District's High Schools. Students from Pioneer and Grapeview have a choice of going to either Shelton or North Mason school districts.

== Schools ==
=== Bordeaux Elementary School (Grades K-4) ===
Bordeaux Elementary is located south of downtown Shelton at 350 E. University Ave Shelton, WA 98584. Their Principal is Kyle O'Neil. As of September 2015, they had 547 enrolled students.

=== Evergreen Elementary School (Grades K-4) ===
Evergreen Elementary is located at 900 W. Franklin Street Shelton, Washington 98584. Evergreen Elementary is a Bilingual School. Their Principal is Paula Canady. As of September 2015, they had 529 enrolled students.

=== Mt. View Elementary School (Grades K-4) ===
Mt. View is the Main Elementary School of the District. Located at 534 East K Street, Shelton, WA 98584.Their principal is Greg Woods. as of September 2015 they had 600 enrolled students. Mt. View is right next to Olympic Middle School. Mt. View is also where most school board meetings take place.

=== Olympic Middle School (Grades 5-6) ===
Olympic Middle School School is located at 800 East K Street, Shelton, WA 98584. Their principal is Mary K. Johnson. As of September 2015, they had 553 enrolled students.

=== Oakland Bay Jr. High School (Grades 7-8) ===
Oakland Bay Jr. High School is located at 3301 Shelton Springs Road, Shelton, WA 98584. As September 2015 they had 671 enrolled students. Their principal is Teresa Mayr.

=== CHOICE School (Grades 7-12) ===
CHOICE School offers a school tailored for people who favor a very small learning environment with individualized learning. They do asynchronous learning every Wednesday. Their principal is Vernon Bruni. They are located at 807 West Pine Street Shelton, WA 98584. As of September 2015, they had 168 enrolled students. Their max student body amount at any time is 200.

=== Shelton High School (Grades 9-12) ===
Shelton High School is the main high school of the district with 1,509 students. They have a "California Style" campus with multiplie buildings connected by outdoor walkways. In 2019, a renovation was done replacing one of the buildings with a 3-floor academic building. And updating a few parts of the other buildings. As of September 2023, they had about 1500 enrolled students. Their principal is Bruce Kipper.

=== Cedar High School (Grades 9-12) ===
Cedar High School is the newest school of the Shelton School District. They do not have their own school property or building and is located at the Olympic College Shelton Campus.Cedar High School is a PBL (project based learning) school which was formed in the 2020-2021 school year as a response after the COVID-19 pandemic and the effect it gave on schools. It is the smallest school in the SSD with a max of 100 students at any time. The school is favored for students who have strong plans for post high school, favor smaller classes, and are interested in PBL. Cedar is part of the New Tech Network. Their principal is Amber Hosford.

=== Mason County Juvenile Detention Center ===
Despite not being an official school of the SSD, the Mason County Juvenile Detention Center is still operated by the Shelton School District.

== Shelton Success ==
Shelton Success is the SSD's strategic plan for 2022-2027. Their strategic plan has 4 priorities: High Quality Literacy Instruction, College and Career Readiness, Investment in Educators & Leaders, and Safe & Welcoming Environments.

== Mason County Transportation Cooperative ==
The Mason County transportation cooperative is located across the street from SHS at 3740 N Shelton Springs Rd, Shelton, WA 98584. It provides school bus transportation for Shelton, Pioneer, and Southside School Districts.
