= Brian Fairbrother =

American soccer coach

Personal information
- Nationality: United States
- Born: Brian Fairbrother
- Education: Inglewood High School (California); Western Washington University
- Occupations: Soccer Coach & Teacher
- Years active: 1981 - 2007

Sport
- Sport: Boys' Soccer: 222-158-42; Girls' Soccer: 91-110-22
- Team: Shelton High School (Washington) Highclimbers
- Retired: 2007

Brian Fairbrother is an American soccer coach known for his contributions to the development of soccer in Shelton, Washington. He is known for founding the soccer programs at Shelton High School, where he established the boys' program in 1981 and the girls' program in 1985.

== Early life and education ==
Fairbrother grew up in Southern California, graduating from Inglewood High School (California) before attending Western Washington University in Bellingham. When he arrived in Shelton in the late 1970s, he noticed the absence of soccer in the community, which contrasted with other schools in Thurston County, Washington.

== Career ==
=== Founding youth soccer programs ===
Fairbrother became a founding member of both the Shelton Youth Soccer Club and the South Mason Soccer Club. He obtained soccer equipment from the basement of Tumwater, Washington dentist Dr. George Gunderson to help develop youth soccer in South Mason County. By 2007, three hundred children were participating in youth soccer in South Mason. Several of his players went on to win the 1999 U-17 state championship with South Mason Soccer Club.

=== Coaching at Shelton High School ===
Fairbrother began coaching the Shelton boys' soccer team in 1981 as a volunteer, recognizing the need to establish a program. "They didn't have a teacher,” he told The Olympian, "and I figured the program would die if it didn't get started this year." Initially, Shelton played in the Black Hills League with a junior varsity level team. By 1983, the boys' team won their first home game, and in 1985, they had their first winning season.

In 1994, the Shelton boys' team won their first Black Hills League championship with a 13-2-1 record, and advanced to the Washington 2-A state playoffs. Shelton were co-league champs in 1998 with the best record (15–2–1) in the school's history. Fairbrother was named Black Hills League coach of the year in 1993 and 1994. The team earned their first post-season win in 1999 against John F. Kennedy Catholic High School (Washington) who were defending state champions. Following that season, Fairbrother's team had several players earn all-league honors. That same year, he led the girls' team to their first appearance in the regional tournament at Stadium High School in Tacoma, Washington. Shelton's boys' team also won league titles in 2000 and 2001. In 2002, Shelton completed their final season in the Pacific-9 league with an undefeated 8-0-1 record. The team got knocked out of the state playoffs, but won the Washington Interscholastic Activities Association Class 4A academic state championship.

=== Retirement ===
Fairbrother retired as head coach of the girls' program in 1999 (91–110–22) and the boys' in 2007 (222–158–42). In 2024, he was inducted into the Shelton, Washington hall of fame.
