= Henry Beach Needham =

American muckraking investigative journalist

Henry Beach Needham (August 10, 1871 – June 17, 1915) was an American journalist, author, and war correspondent known for his contributions to muckraking and investigative journalism in the early 20th century. He gained prominence through his articles that exposed corruption and social injustices, particularly the brutality in college football. Known for his friendship and occasional coverage of President Theodore Roosevelt, he also wrote extensively about baseball manager Connie Mack. He authored two books and contributed to notable magazines such as McClure's Magazine, Saturday Evening Post, and Collier's Weekly. Needham was killed in a plane crash while covering World War I as a journalist.

== Early life and education ==
Needham was born on August 10, 1871, in Castile, Wyoming County, New York. He was the son of Charles Willis Needham, a lawyer who served as the solicitor general for the Interstate Commerce Division. and later became the President of George Washington University from 1902 to 1910.

The Needham family relocated to Chicago in 1874, where his father pursued his legal career. In 1890, they moved again to Washington D.C., where his father continued to practice law and eventually became a professor of comparative constitutional law and interstate commerce law at American University.

He studied at Brown University for three years before moving on to study law at George Washington University, where he was admitted to the bar in the District of Columbia in 1894. In 1896, he left the legal profession to pursue a career in journalism.

== Career ==
Needham's muckraking articles helped him gain attention as an investigative journalist. He wrote for several notable publications, including McClure’s Magazine, where his work often focused on exposing corruption and advocating for reform.

One of his most notable contributions was his two-part article "The College Athlete" published in 1905 in McClure's Magazine. This exposé brought national attention to the brutality and corruption in college football, leading to significant reforms in the sport.

Needham also published two books: Divorcing Lady Nicotine (1913) and The Double Squeeze (1915).

In 1906, Needham approached Connie Mack, the manager of the Philadelphia Athletics, about shadowing him and the team for a profile in McClure’s Magazine. Over the years, the two became close friends.

=== Relationship with Theodore Roosevelt ===
Needham's career intersected notably with the presidency of Theodore Roosevelt. Their relationship was underscored by correspondence, including letters exchanged on matters of mutual interest. Their close relationship allowed Needham to write detailed and personal profiles of Roosevelt's political and domestic activities. Roosevelt's support for Needham's journalistic work was instrumental in the impact of his exposés, particularly his noteworthy article on football, leading to his involvement in efforts to reform the sport.

In 1908, Roosevelt appointed Needham to a special commission to investigate labor and accommodation conditions during the construction of the Panama Canal. During his tenure, he examined the living conditions of the workforce, assessed the scale and efficiency of construction operations, and evaluated the development of essential infrastructure on the Isthmus of Panama. His findings highlighted significant challenges in housing, healthcare, and logistical operations, which informed comprehensive recommendations aimed at improving the well-being and productivity of the workers engaged in the project.

=== War correspondent and death ===
During World War I, Needham served as a war correspondent in Europe for The Independent and Collier's Weekly. While researching an aviation article on June 17, 1915, he was killed in a plane crash near Paris alongside the British aviator Sub-Lieutenant Reginald "Rex" Warneford.

== Books ==
- Divorcing Lady Nicotine: Getting the Upper Hand of the Smoking Habit. Chicago: Forbes, 1913.
- The Double Squeeze. Garden City, N.Y.: Doubleday, Page, 1915. (Internet Archive)

== Personal life ==
Needham was married to Mary Master Needham, a fellow journalist and writer.
