= Arthur Needham =

American businessman and politician (1859–1915)

- Born: February 5, 1859; Sheffield, England
- Died: August 29, 1915 (aged 56); Shelton, Washington
- Occupations: Haberdasher; lumber businessman
- Organizations: Odd Fellows; Knights of the Maccabees; Yeomen; Woodmen of the World; Ancient Order of United Workmen; Fraternal Order of Eagles
- Known for: Was the first merchant-haberdasher of Shelton, Washington, and an experienced lumberman. Was an active member of social organizations and a Democratic nominee for the position of mayor of Shelton.
- Political party: Democrat
- Spouse: Ida Day (married 1888–1915)
- Children: Arthur N. Needham; Ida M. Needham; Maurice H. Needham; Elva Rowena Needham; Earl Needham

Arthur Needham (February 5, 1859 – August 29, 1915) was a Washington State pioneer, haberdasher, and politician. When Shelton was incorporated as a city in 1890, Needham was among the five councilmen of the new City Council. He ran for mayor in 1898 as the Democratic nominee, but lost to the Republican candidate.

Needham started his time in Washington State by working in the lumber business. For a number of years, he worked as a cruiser, researching the quality of forests for lumber purchasers. Later, he combined his cruiser duties with the position of Superintendent of Building and Operating for the Peninsular Railroad Company. As a pioneer of Shelton, Needham entered the clothing business. He invested his savings into his own men's clothing store and founded the Needham Mercantile Company. He was the first haberdasher (men's clothing retailer) in Mason County.

Needham was an active member of popular fraternities, such as the Odd Fellows, the Ancient Order of United Workmen, the Fraternal Order of Eagles, and others.

== Early life and education ==
Needham was born on February 5, 1859, in Sheffield, England. He was brought to America at the age of nine, and lived with friends of the family in Saginaw, Michigan. He grew up and was educated there.

== Career ==
=== Lumbering business and Peninsular Railroad Company ===
Needham came to Washington Territory in 1883, when the lumber business was popular, and a vast array of men were employed in its different branches. Growing up in Saginaw, the city considered the "center of a large lumbering industry," Needham was interested in logging. In Washington, he started to work as a cruiser, or estimator, his job being to investigate forests and closely study their qualities to provide information to lumber purchasers. He became an expert in this field.

Needham worked as an assistant manager at Satsop Railroad, which became a part of the Peninsular Railroad Company in 1889. After working five years for the company, he was made Superintendent of Building and Operating, combining that position with his job as a cruiser.

=== Clothing business ===
As a cruiser and superintendent in the Peninsular Railroad Company, Needham received what was judged to be "good wages," and later was able to invest into a mercantile business. He opened his own store in Shelton, becoming the first haberdasher in the city and county. In 1909, Needham founded a corporation named the Needham Mercantile Company in collaboration with his wife Ida and partner C. E. Barnard. Needham supplied his male customers with hats, caps, shoes and other necessary items. In the adjoining store, Needham's wife sold women's hats. Over the years, the Needhams "built up an excellent business" and made a vast array of friends in the city.

=== Political activity ===
On May 17, 1890, Shelton was incorporated as a town, and Needham became one of the new five-member City Council.

In 1898, Needham was the Democratic nominee for the position of mayor, but lost the election to the Republican L. J. Morrison by seventeen votes.

=== Other activity and retirement ===
During the Klondike Gold Rush in 1897, Needham visited the departure point for gold diggers in Dyea, Alaska. However, he soon returned home due to "severe hardships."

In later years, Needham suffered from blindness and was forced to retire.

== Memberships ==
Needham was an active member of several fraternities, or what were known as the "most prominent secret societies." He was a member of the Odd Fellows, the Knights of the Maccabees, the Yeomen, the Woodmen of the World, the Ancient Order of United Workmen, and the Fraternal Order of Eagles.

== Personal life and death ==
Needham married Ida Day in 1888. They had five children: Arthur, Ida, Maurice, Elva Rowena and Earl Needham. The family lived in their home in Shelton, Washington.

Needham died on August 29, 1915, in his home in Shelton.

== See also ==
- Saginaw, Michigan
- Haberdasher

== Literature cited ==
- Angle, Grant C., ed. (August 27, 1897), "Home from Alaska", The Mason County journal, Shelton: Journal Pub. Co., p. 2, ISSN 2471-2043, LCCN sn88085081, OCLC 17319674
- Angle, Grant C., ed. (December 9, 1898), "The Municipal Election", The Mason County journal, Shelton: Journal Pub. Co., p. 3, ISSN 2471-2043, LCCN sn88085081, OCLC 17319674
- Becker, Paula (September 20, 2010), Rousso, Nick (ed.), "Shelton residents vote to incorporate as a town of the fourth class on May 17, 1890", historylink.org, Seattle: HistoryLink, OCLC 124224498
- Blethen, Alden J., ed. (February 10, 1909), "New corporations", Seattle Daily Times, Seattle: The Seattle Times Company, p. 19, ISSN 2639-4898, LCCN sn86072007, OCLC 1765328
- Hunt, Herbert; Kaylor, Floyd C. (1917), Washington, west of the Cascades; historical and descriptive; the explorers, the Indians, the pioneers, the modern, Chicago: S. J. Clarke Publishing Company, LCCN 18015511, OCLC 10086413
- Murphy, John Miller, ed. (September 3, 1915), "Deaths of past week", The Washington Standard, Olympia: McClatchy, p. 8, ISSN 2379-7339, LCCN sn84022770, OCLC 10580261
- "Obituaries and Death Notices: Arthur Needham", Olympia Record, Olympia: Washington Recorder Pub. Co., August 31, 1915, OCLC 664151443
- "Peninsular pointers", Livingston County Daily Press and Argus, Howell: Joseph T. Titus, p. 2, May 17, 1888, OCLC 12147218
- Prosser, William Farrand (1903), Lewis, Edward Gardner (ed.), A history of the Puget Sound country, its resources, its commerce and its people, New York City: Edward Gardner Lewis, LCCN 05013767
- Thompson, G. E. (August 29, 1890), Angle, Grant C. (ed.), "Real Estate Transfers", The Mason County journal, Shelton: Journal Pub. Co., p. 5, ISSN 2471-2043, LCCN sn88085081, OCLC 17319674
