= Shelton, Washington =

- City
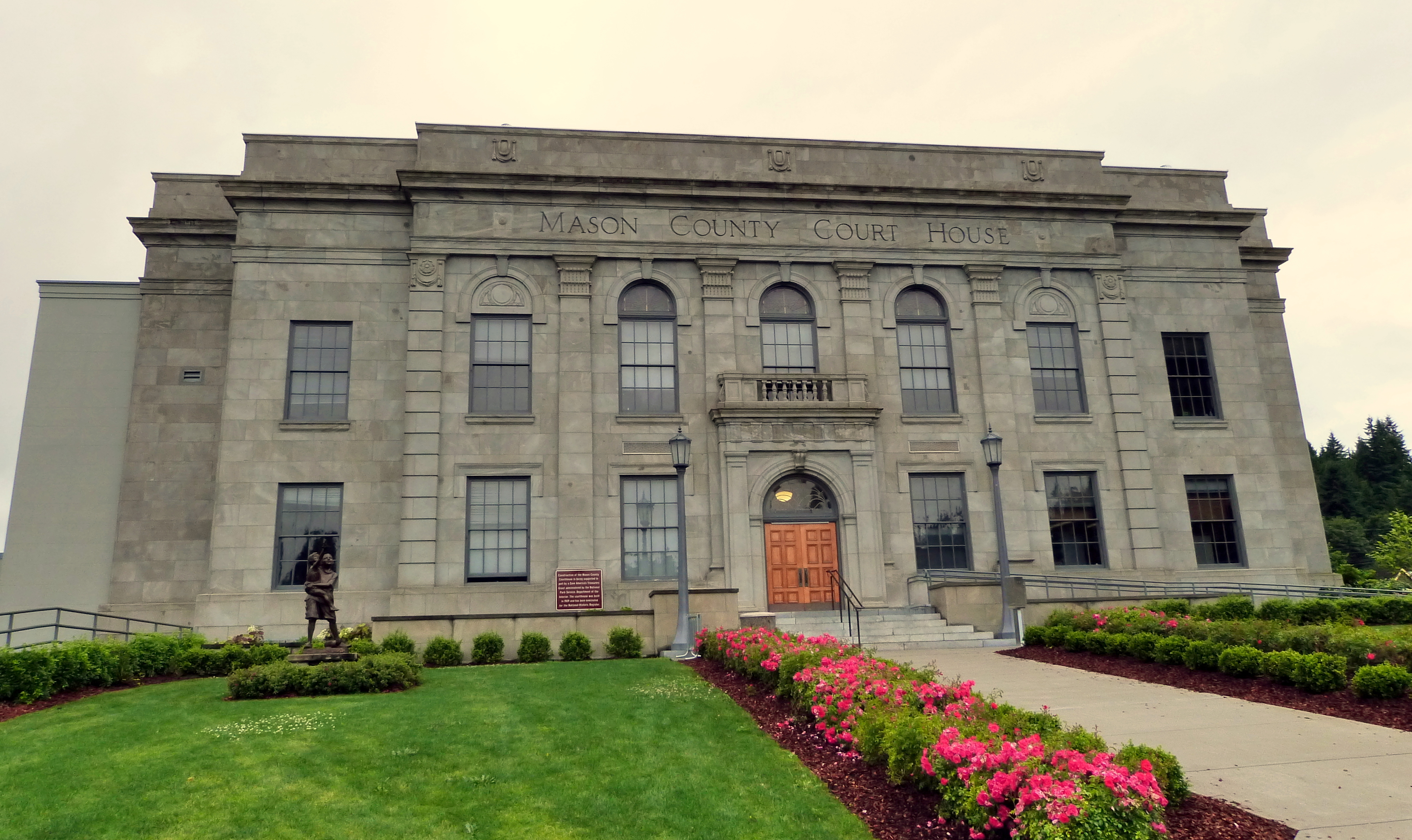
- Mason County Court House in Shelton, Washington.
- Nicknames: "Christmastown, USA" "Evergreen City"
- Location of Shelton, Washington
- Coordinates: 47°13′18″N 123°07′32″W
- Country: United States
- State: Washington
- County: Mason

Government
  - Type: Council–manager
  - Mayor: Eric Onisko

Area
  - Total: 6.25 sq mi (16.18 km^{2})
  - Land: 5.81 sq mi (15.05 km^{2})
  - Water: 0.44 sq mi (1.13 km^{2})
- Elevation: 197 ft (60 m)

Population (2020)
  - Total: 10,371
  - Density: 1,785/sq mi (689.2/km^{2})
- Time zone: UTC-8 (Pacific (PST))
  - Summer (DST): UTC-7 (PDT)
- ZIP Code: 98584
- Area code(s): 360, 564
- FIPS code: 53-63735
- GNIS feature ID: 2411882
- Website: sheltonwa.gov

Shelton is a city in and the county seat of Mason County, Washington, United States. Shelton is the westernmost city on Puget Sound. The population was 10,371 at the 2020 census. Shelton has a council–manager form of government and was the last city in Washington to use a mayor–commission form of government.

== History ==
Shelton was officially incorporated in 1890. The city was named after David Shelton, a delegate to the territorial legislature. The land was previously called "Cota" and was inhabited and managed by the Squaxin Island Tribe, or "People of the Waters", who had inhabited the land for centuries before contact with white settlers. The land was ceded, along with 4,000 sq. miles of Indigenous land, on December 26, 1854, with the passage of the Treaty of Medicine Creek. After the passage of the treaty, David Shelton and his wife, Frances Shelton, each took a claim of land enabled by the Donation Land Claim Act totaling 640 acres in what would eventually be incorporated as Shelton.

Shelton was once served by a small fleet of steamboats which was part of the Puget Sound Mosquito Fleet. These boats included the Old Settler, Irene, Willie, City of Shelton, Marian, Clara Brown, and S.G. Simpson. The economy was built around logging, farming, dairying and ranching as well as oyster cultivation. The Simpson Timber Company mill on Puget Sound's Oakland Bay dominated the landscape of the downtown area; the mill was sold to Sierra Pacific Industries in 2015, who are currently building a new mill. Shelton also identified itself as "Christmastown, USA" due to the area's cultivation of Christmas trees; the name was later revived for an annual festival.

The Ridge Motorsports Park opened in 2012, and has hosted MotoAmerica and Trans-Am Series races.

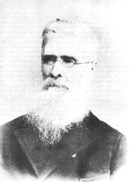
David Shelton, 1812–1897

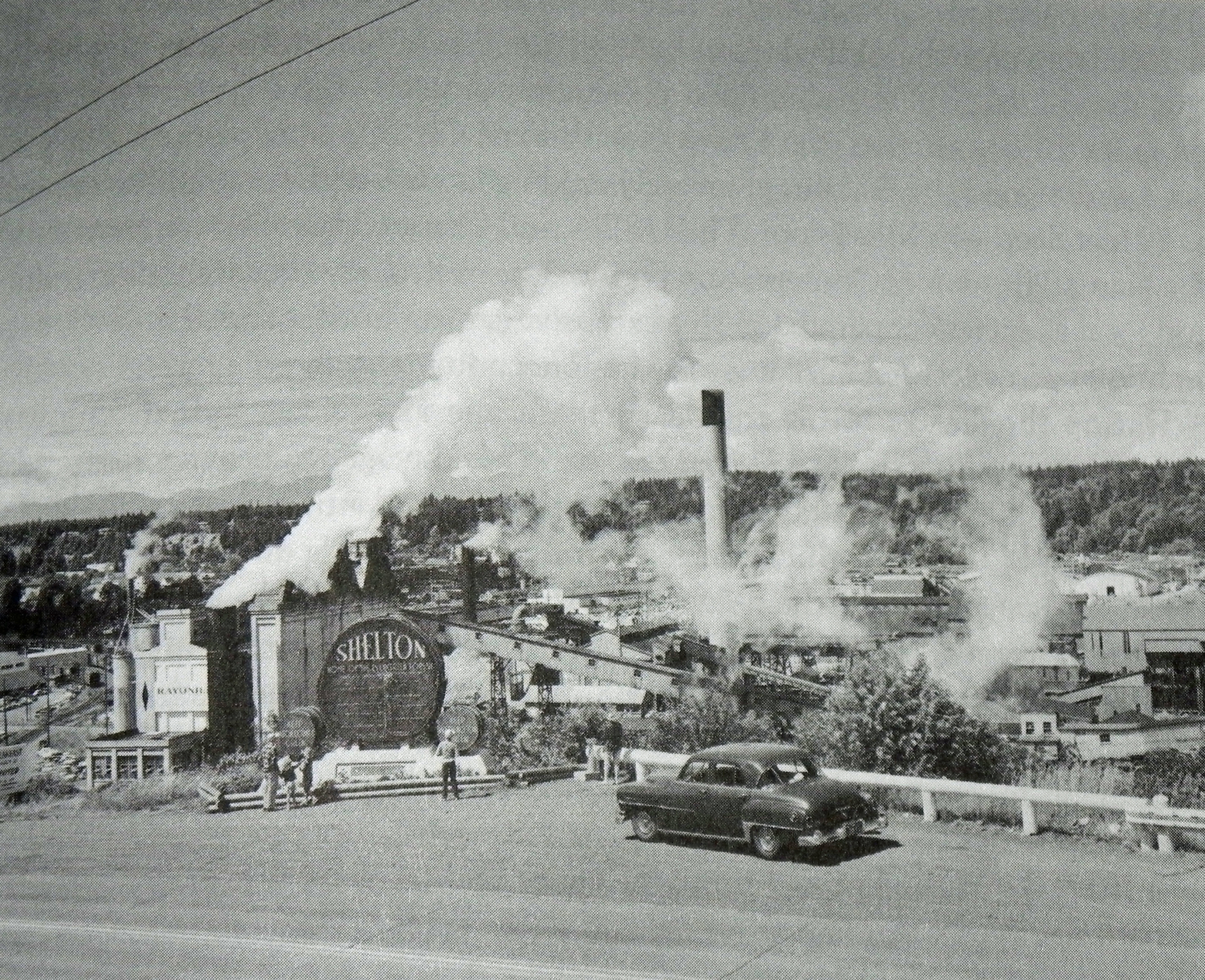
Shelton sawmills

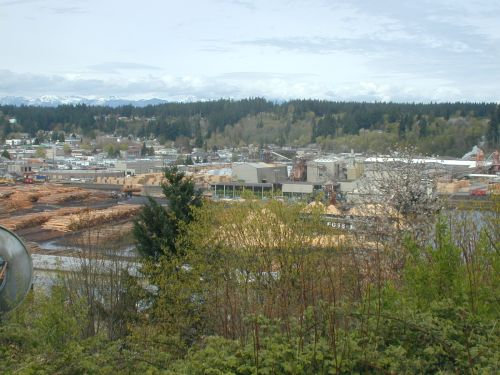
Simpson Timber Company mill in Shelton, on the Oakland Bay, viewed from the southeast.

Loggers with a ten-foot fir log in Shelton, Washington in the early 20th century

== Geography ==
According to the United States Census Bureau, the city has a total area of 6.09 square miles (15.77 km^{2}), of which 5.76 square miles (14.92 km^{2}) is land and 0.33 square miles (0.85 km^{2}) is water.

=== Climate ===
With extremely precipitous rainfall in winter and dry summer of less than 33 mm in the driest month (less than 1/3 of the rainy season), Shelton has a warm summer Mediterranean climate (Köppen: Csb) with cold winters, similar to the larger cities of the Pacific Northwest.

Climate data for Shelton, 1931-1999 normals and extremes
Month	Jan	Feb	Mar	Apr	May	Jun	Jul	Aug	Sep	Oct	Nov	Dec	Year
Record high °F (°C)	68 (20)	72 (22)	76 (24)	89 (32)	98 (37)	110 (43)	104 (40)	107 (42)	99 (37)	87 (31)	70 (21)	66 (19)	110 (43)
Mean daily maximum °F (°C)	44.8 (7.1)	49.1 (9.5)	53.8 (12.1)	60.2 (15.7)	67.4 (19.7)	72 (22)	77.3 (25.2)	77.1 (25.1)	71.9 (22.2)	61.2 (16.2)	50.9 (10.5)	45.4 (7.4)	60.9 (16.1)
Mean daily minimum °F (°C)	32.9 (0.5)	34.1 (1.2)	35.6 (2.0)	38.8 (3.8)	44 (7)	48.8 (9.3)	52 (11)	52.2 (11.2)	48 (9)	42.2 (5.7)	37.3 (2.9)	34.4 (1.3)	41.7 (5.4)
Record low °F (°C)	−2 (−19)	0 (−18)	17 (−8)	22 (−6)	25 (−4)	32 (0)	36 (2)	34 (1)	30 (−1)	22 (−6)	5 (−15)	6 (−14)	−2 (−19)
Average precipitation inches (mm)	10.32 (262)	8.23 (209)	6.82 (173)	4.2 (110)	2.29 (58)	1.7 (43)	0.92 (23)	1.2 (30)	2.46 (62)	5.79 (147)	9.88 (251)	11.37 (289)	65.17 (1,655)
Average snowfall inches (cm)	4.7 (12)	0.9 (2.3)	0.6 (1.5)	0 (0)	0 (0)	0 (0)	0 (0)	0 (0)	0 (0)	0 (0)	0.9 (2.3)	1.9 (4.8)	9 (23)
Average precipitation days (≥ 0.01 inch)	21	18	19	15	12	9	5	6	9	14	20	22	170
Source: WRCC

== Demographics ==
Historical population
Census	Pop.	Note	%±
1890	648		—
1900	833		28.5%
1910	1,163		39.6%
1920	984		−15.4%
1930	3,091		214.1%
1940	3,707		19.9%
1950	5,045		36.1%
1960	5,651		12.0%
1970	6,515		15.3%
1980	7,629		17.1%
1990	7,241		−5.1%
2000	8,442		16.6%
2010	9,834		16.5%
2020	10,371		5.5%
U.S. Decennial Census

=== Racial and ethnic composition ===
Racial composition as of the 2020 census
Race	Number	Percent
White	6,897	66.5%
Black or African American	90	0.9%
American Indian and Alaska Native	521	5.0%
Asian	127	1.2%
Native Hawaiian and Other Pacific Islander	47	0.5%
Some other race	1,441	13.9%
Two or more races	1,248	12.0%
Hispanic or Latino (of any race)	2,609	25.2%

=== 2020 census ===
As of the 2020 census, Shelton had a population of 10,371 people, 3,696 households, and 2,055 families residing in the city. The median age was 35.6 years, with 25.8% of residents under the age of 18 and 16.6% 65 years of age or older. For every 100 females there were 96.3 males, and for every 100 females age 18 and over there were 93.1 males age 18 and over.

There were 3,696 households in Shelton, of which 36.7% had children under the age of 18 living in them. Of all households, 40.3% were married-couple households, 18.6% were households with a male householder and no spouse or partner present, and 31.4% were households with a female householder and no spouse or partner present. About 29.1% of all households were made up of individuals and 14.7% had someone living alone who was 65 years of age or older. The average household size was 2.95 and the average family size was 3.73.

There were 3,887 housing units, of which 4.9% were vacant. The homeowner vacancy rate was 1.2% and the rental vacancy rate was 5.0%.

99.5% of residents lived in urban areas, while 0.5% lived in rural areas.

=== 2010 census ===
As of the 2010 census, there were 9,834 people, 3,574 households, and 2,166 families residing in the city. The population density was 1,707.3 inhabitants per square mile (659.2/km^{2}). There were 3,847 housing units at an average density of 667.9 per square mile (257.9/km^{2}). The racial makeup of the city was 78.9% White, 0.8% African American, 3.7% Native American, 1.1% Asian, 0.8% Pacific Islander, 9.9% from other races, and 4.9% from two or more races. Hispanic or Latino of any race were 19.2% of the population.

There were 3,574 households, of which 35.3% had children under the age of 18 living with them, 38.1% were married couples living together, 15.5% had a female householder with no husband present, 6.9% had a male householder with no wife present, and 39.4% were non-families. 31.2% of all households were made up of individuals, and 15.6% had someone living alone who was 65 years of age or older. The average household size was 2.63 and the average family size was 3.23.

The median age in the city was 33.1 years. 26.4% of residents were under the age of 18; 10.8% were between the ages of 18 and 24; 26.5% were from 25 to 44; 21.9% were from 45 to 64; and 14.3% were 65 years of age or older. The gender makeup of the city was 49.1% male and 50.9% female.

== Government ==
Shelton was the last city in Washington to use a mayor–commission form of government. In November 2017, the voters of Shelton adopted a council-manager form of municipal governance.

== Education ==
The Shelton School District is composed of eight schools:

- Evergreen, Mountain View, and Bordeaux Elementary Schools, kindergarten through fourth grade
- Olympic Middle School, fifth and sixth grades
- Oakland Bay Junior High, seventh and eighth grades
- Shelton High School, ninth through twelfth grades
- CHOICE Alternative School, seventh through twelfth grade
- Cedar High School, a New Tech Network Project-Based Learning high school for grades ninth through twelfth

== Notable people ==
- Raul Allegre - former NFL kicker
- Justin Ena – former NFL linebacker
- Brian Fairbrother - soccer coach who founded soccer program at Shelton High School
- Richard Fiske - actor, killed in action in France in World War 2
- Karol Kennedy – 5-time national champion and 1952 Winter Olympics silver medalist
- Mary Miranda Knight – pioneer and educator
- Desmond "Des" Dalworth Koch – 1956 Olympic bronze medalist, discus
- Jerry Lambert – film and television actor
- Arthur Needham – member of the first city council and the first haberdasher in the county
- Lawson H. M. Sanderson – Marine Corps aviation pioneer with the rank of major general
- Caleb Schlauderaff – NFL offensive lineman
- Paul Stamets – Mushroom enthusiast
