= First schoolhouse in Olympia, Washington =

First school built in Olympia, Washington

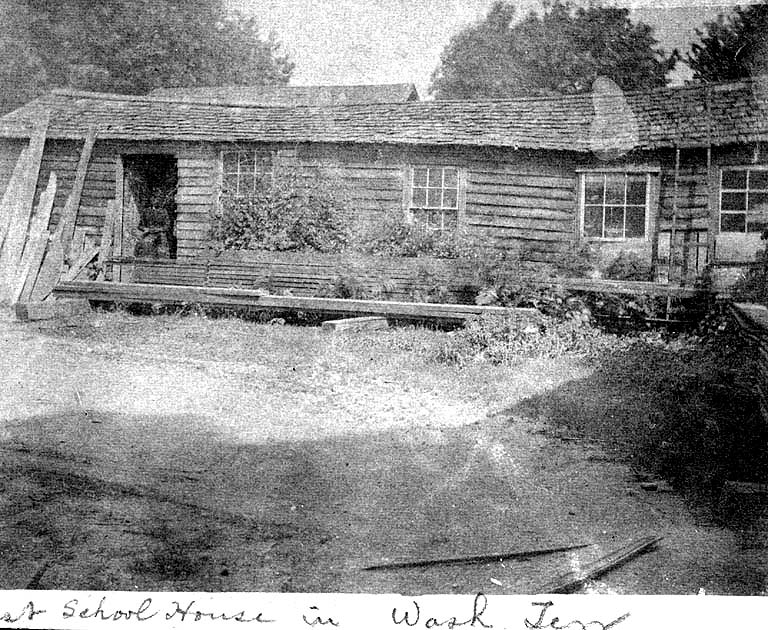
Olympia schoolhouse. Handwritten caption says "first school house in Wash Terr.

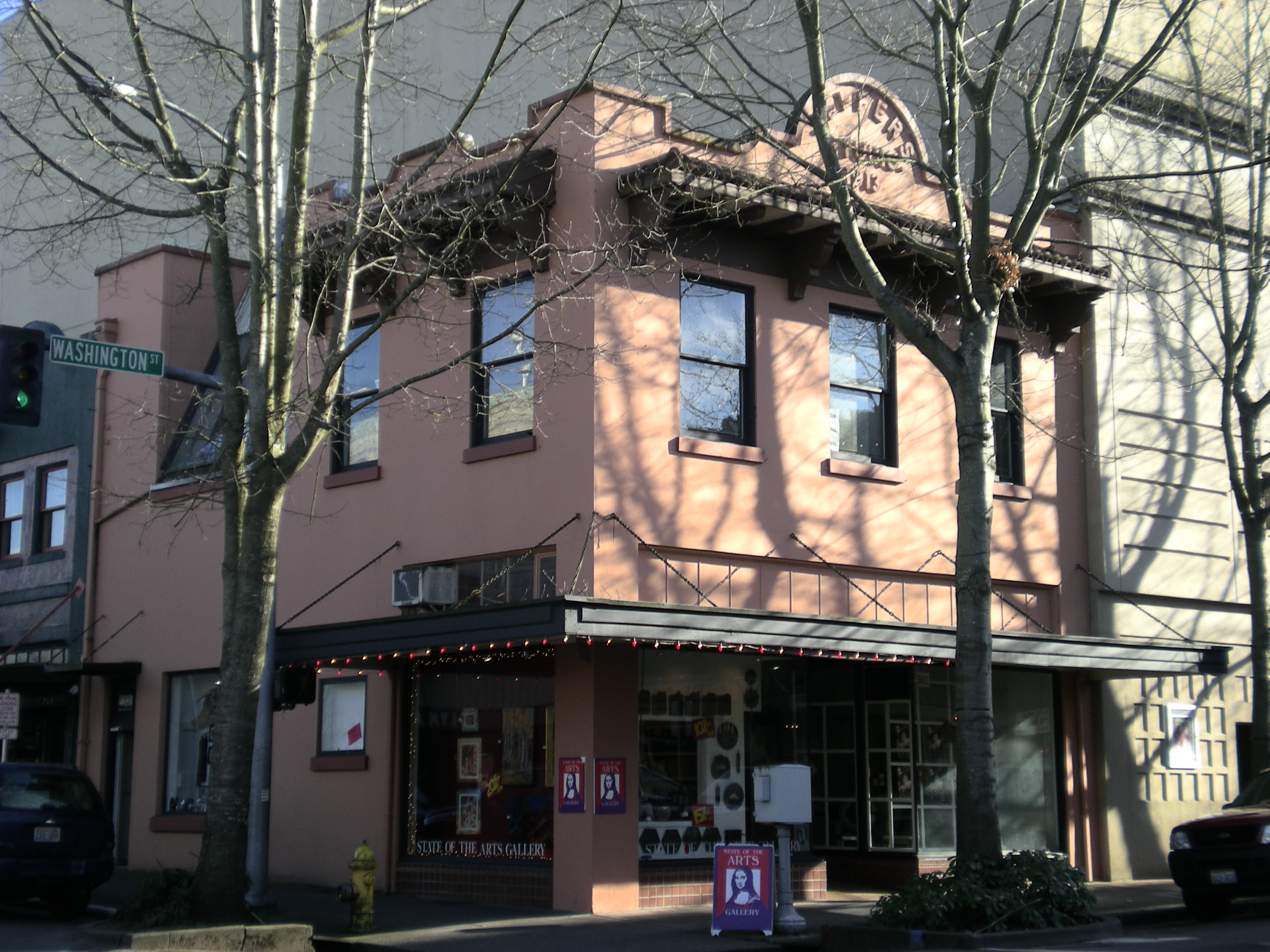
Jeffers Studio at corner of 5th and Washington in 2008

The first schoolhouse in Olympia, Washington was built in the fall of 1852.

According to an 1853 newspaper, it was one of three schools north of Cowlitz Landing, Washington (i.e. in Washington Territory), and the only public school of the three. (Note: The Columbian, Olympia, July 16, 1853 reported by Hubert Howe Bancroft in 1890) Its foundation preceded public schools in other early Puget Sound region settlements; Steilacoom, the state's first town to incorporate, was taught out of a living room when the state's first school district was created there in 1854, and the landing of the Denny Party in Alki (Seattle) was less than one year prior.

Early Washington schools, built beginning from the 1850s, were made of locally sourced materials, log cabin style. It stood at a location described as "on a hill" bounded by Fifth and Sixth Streets (now Legion) between Franklin and Washington; now the block holds Joseph Wohleb's 1912 design Jeffers Studio and the Capitol Theater.

The first Fourth of July oration in Washington (a common Independence Day celebration in the 19th century) was held at the schoolhouse shortly after creation of Washington Territory in 1853. The building collapsed after a heavy snowfall the following year.

A new, two-story building was built at the same location, which was maintained by School District 1. When the school moved to the Central School location at Union and Washington, the old schoolhouse was used as the Thurston County courthouse.

The Jeffers Building by architect Joseph Wohleb was erected at the location in 1913.
