= Olympia Downtown Historic District =

Historic district in Washington, United States

- U.S. National Register of Historic Places
- U.S. Historic district
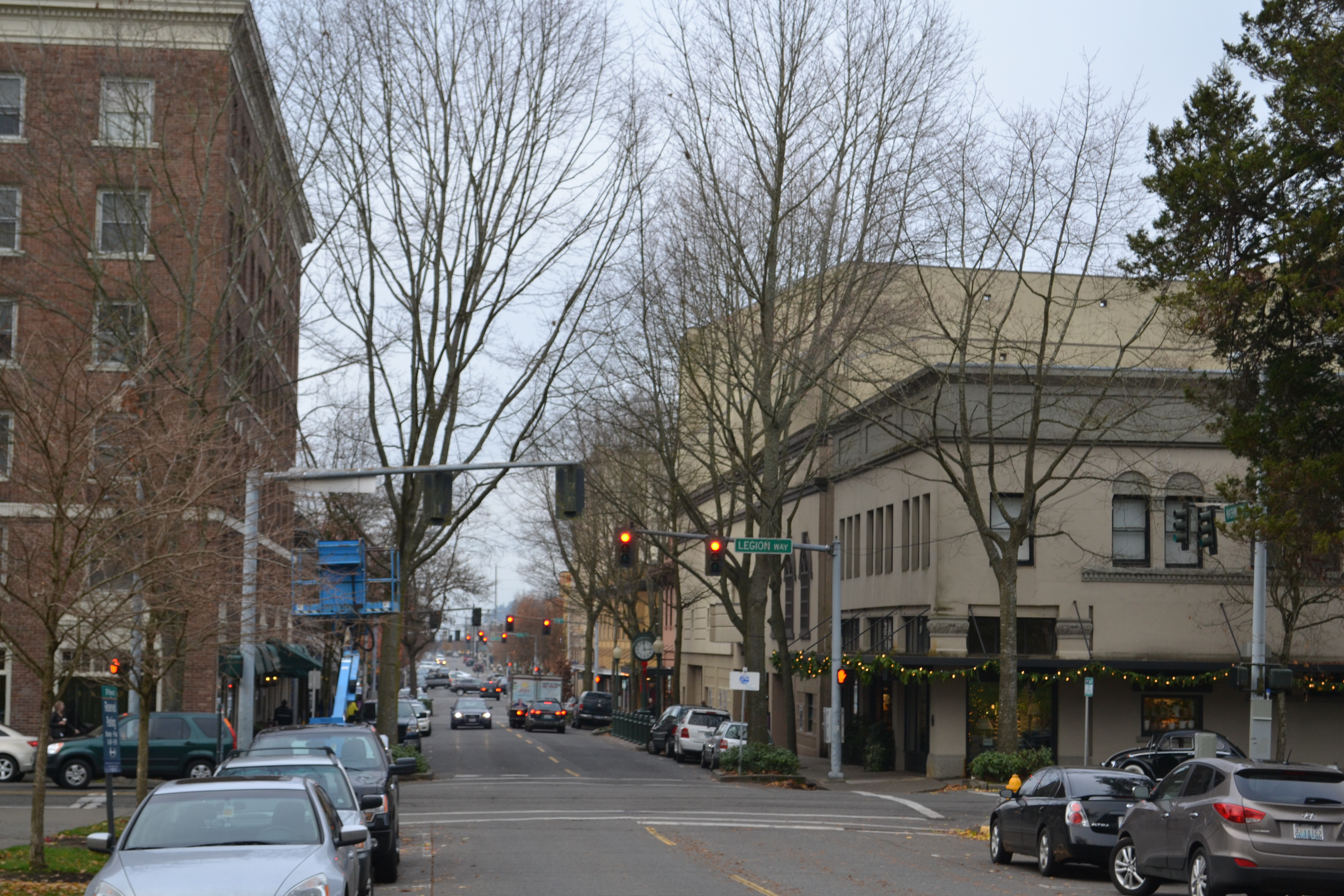
- Washington Street in the heart of the historic district

- Location within Washington (state)
- Location: Olympia, Washington
- Coordinates: 47°02′38.8″N 122°54′01.1″W
- Area: 26.74 acres (10.82 ha)
- Built: 1853–1889
- Architectural style: Romanesque, Beaux-Arts
- NRHP reference No.: 04001008
- Added to NRHP: September 15, 2004

The Olympia Downtown Historic District is a historic district located in Olympia, Washington, the state's capital. The district, listed on the National Register of Historic Places since 2004, covers 17 blocks in downtown Olympia and includes 51 contributing properties.

The majority of buildings in Downtown Olympia were built between 1911 and 1930, decades after Washington gained statehood with Olympia as its capital city. Three earthquakes, in 1949, 1965 and 2001, damaged buildings in downtown Olympia.

Several properties in the historic district were designed by architect Joseph Wohleb, who hails from the area.

== Buildings ==
Individual buildings in the historic district include the Hotel Olympian, the Old Capitol Building and Capitol Theater. All of these are within one or two blocks of Sylvester Park, also named as part of the district.

Seven properties are landmarks in their own right and were already separately listed in the National Register:

- Old Capitol Building (#84)
- Town Square, also known as Sylvester Park (#68)
- Elk's Building (#39)
- Jeffers Studio (#79)
- Mottman Building (#18)
- Olympia National Bank (#59)
- Olympia Public Library, a Carnegie Library (#86)
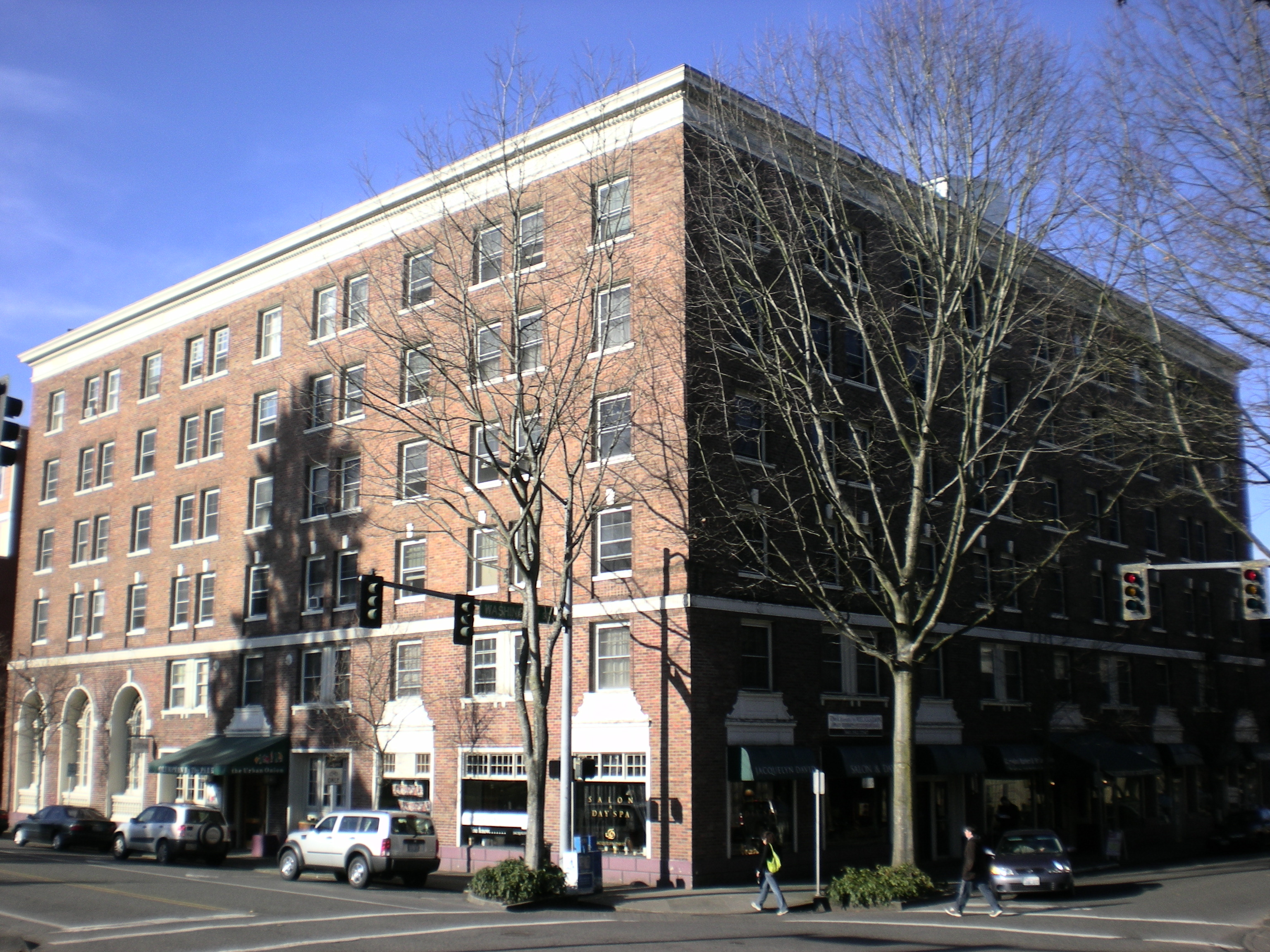
Hotel Olympian, 2008
