= Thurston County Courthouse (Washington) =

Former courthouse in Thurston County, Washington

- U.S. National Register of Historic Places
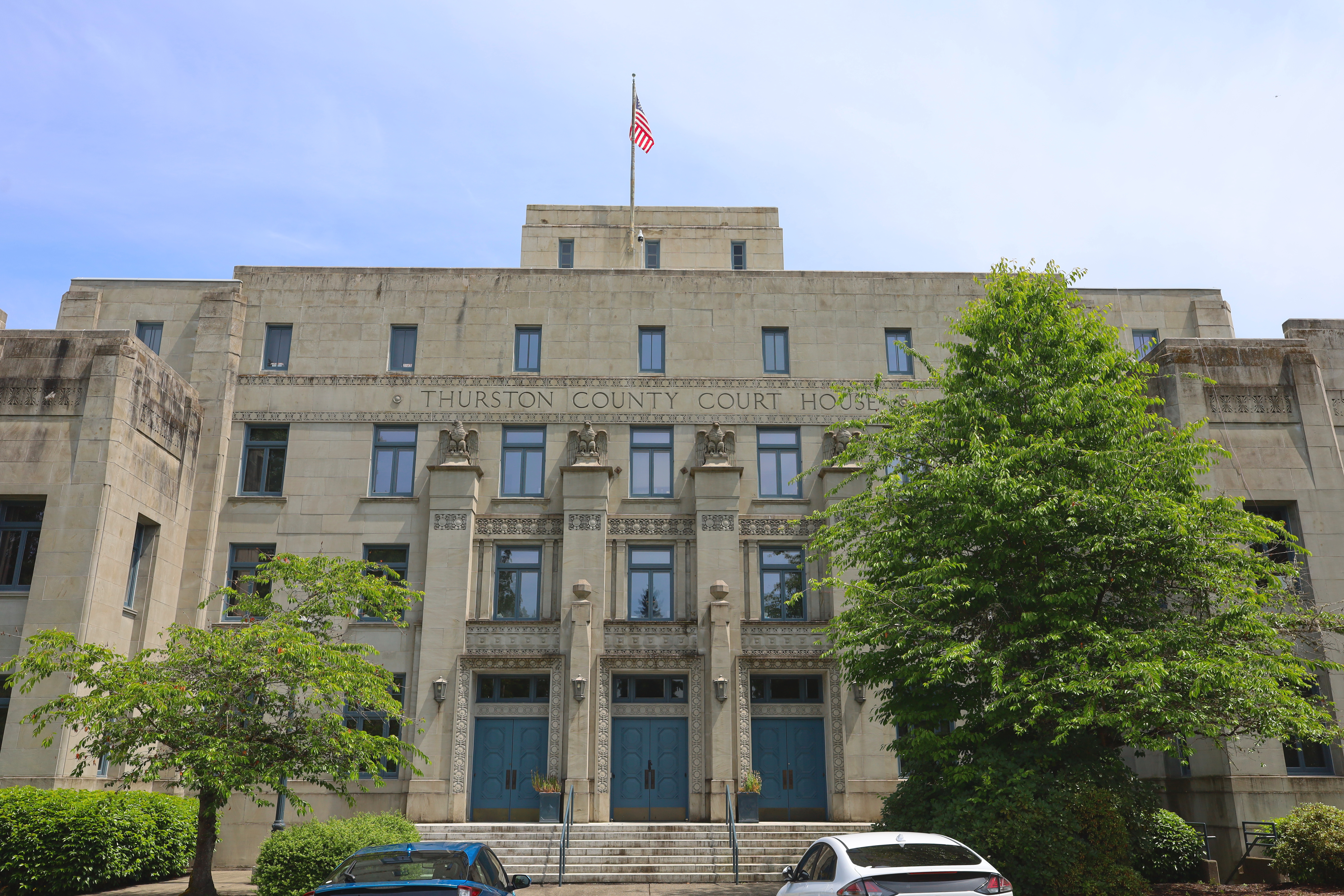
- Front of Courthouse in 2025
- Interactive map of Courthouse location
- Location: 1110 Capitol Way South, Olympia, Washington
- Coordinates: 47.03763°N 122.90019°W
- Area: 50,000 square feet (4,600 m^{2})
- Built: 1930
- Built by: Walter Boyer of Yakima
- Architect: Joseph Wohleb
- Architectural style: Art Deco
- Restored: 1991
- Website: capitol.wa.gov/discover/buildings/capitol-court-building
- NRHP reference No.: 81000592
- Added to NRHP: July 23, 1981

The Thurston County Courthouse a.k.a. the Capitol Court Building in Olympia, Washington is the former headquarters of Thurston County. It was built in 1930 and has been listed on the National Register of Historic Places since 1981. In 1978, the court was relocated to Olympia's Westside; the building remained vacant until 1989 and renovations were completed in 1991. Since 1995, offices in the building have been leased by various government agencies and private businesses.

== Design ==
The Art Deco style, reinforced concrete building has 50,000 square feet (4,600 m^{2}) of floor space and is made of Tenino sandstone. It is 4 stories tall, with a raised basement, a 2-story addition on each side, and topped with a rectangular tower. The foundation measures 184.5 feet (56.2 m) by 84 feet (26 m). The primary contractor was Walter Boyer of Yakima.

== History ==
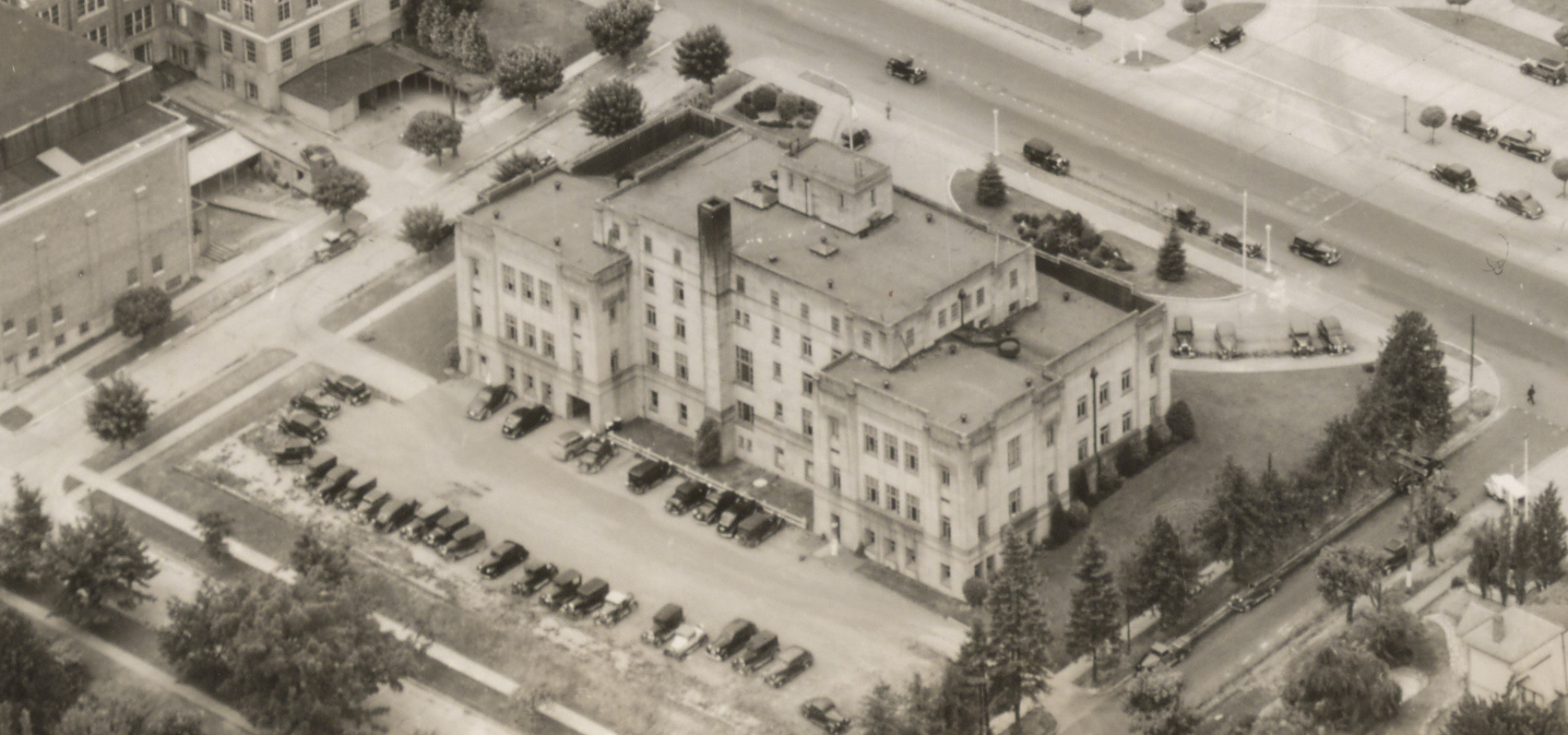
Rear view of the Courthouse in 1938

On March 25, 1929, Joseph Wohleb was selected to design a new courthouse for Thurston County, to be located at the southeast corner of Capitol Way and 11th Avenue. Construction was completed the following year for a project cost of $350,000 (equivalent to $6.75 million in 2025).

A formal dedication ceremony took place on Friday, September 12, 1930 with hundreds in attendance; the courthouse was officially open for business the following Monday, September 15.

In 2020, the building underwent a $3.5 million renovation, including cleaning, repairs to cracks in historic sandstone exterior masonry, and restoration of original windows.

== Tenants ==
As of 2025, the building provides facilities for the following tenants:

- Allied Daily Newspaper of Washington
- Board of Tax Appeals
- Caseload Forecast Council
- Citizens' Commission on Salaries for Elected Officials
- Commission on African American Affairs
- Commission on Asian Pacific American Affairs
- Commission on Hispanic Affairs
- Commission on Judicial Conduct
- Department of Archeology and Historic Preservation
- Department of Enterprise Services Parking Office
- Department of Enterprise Services Capitol Security & Visitor Services
- Governor's Office of Indian Affairs
- Office of Financial Management
- Office of Minority and Women's Business Enterprises
- Puget Sound Partnership

== See also ==
- National Register of Historic Places listings in Thurston County, Washington
