= Olympia National Bank =

Historic bank in Olympia, Washington

- U.S. National Register of Historic Places
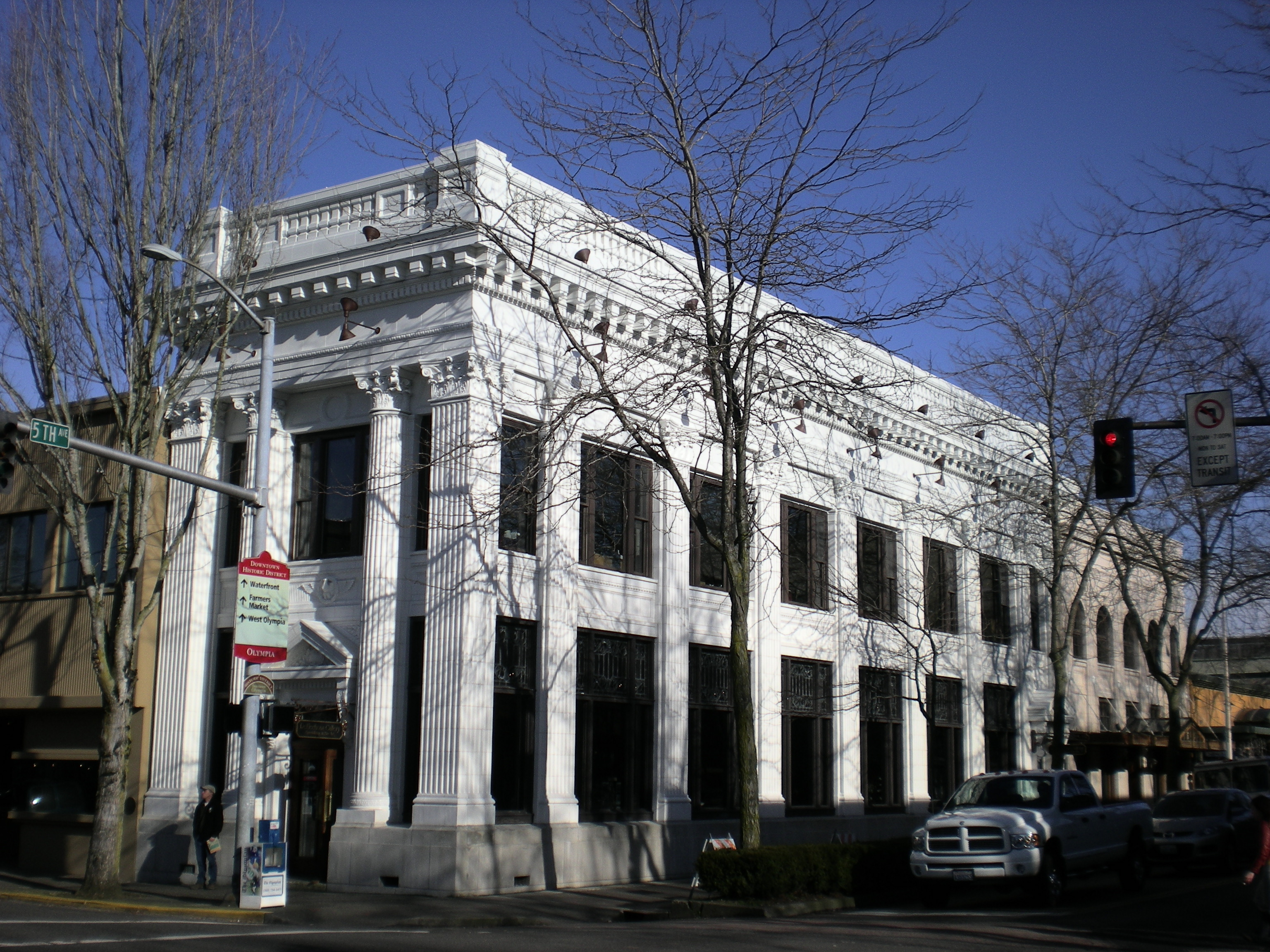
- View of bank, January 2008
- Interactive map of Olympia National Bank
- Location: 422 South Capitol Way, Olympia, Washington
- Coordinates: 47°02′39″N 122°54′4.4″W
- Area: 2,160 square feet (201 m^{2})
- Built: 1915
- Architect: Joseph Wohleb
- Architectural style: Neoclassical, Beaux-Arts
- Part of: Olympia Downtown Historic District (ID04001008)
- NRHP reference No.: 87000869
- Added to NRHP: June 17, 1987

The Olympia National Bank is a historic building in downtown Olympia, Washington, listed on the National Register of Historic Places since 1987. The building was designed by Joseph Wohleb in the neoclassical and Beaux-Arts architecture styles and constructed by the Hurley-Mason Construction Company of Tacoma in c. 1915 for an estimated cost of $50,000 (equivalent to $1.59 million in 2025). It has a 24 feet (7.3 m) by 90 feet (27 m) foundation and two stories.

== History ==
The bank was created in 1899 as Olympia State Bank and converted to a national bank the following year by a vote of trustees.

In 1912, the Schmidt estate (of the Olympia Brewing Company) purchased the bank and moved to its present location on November 1, 1915.

The building sustained damage during the 1949 Olympia earthquake, losing its original baluster elements; and again in the 2001 Nisqually earthquake.

In 1977, the Pacific First Federal Savings Bank moved into the building, and it was completely restored.

== See also ==
- Olympia Downtown Historic District
- National Register of Historic Places listings in Thurston County, Washington
