= Cloverfields =

- U.S. National Register of Historic Places
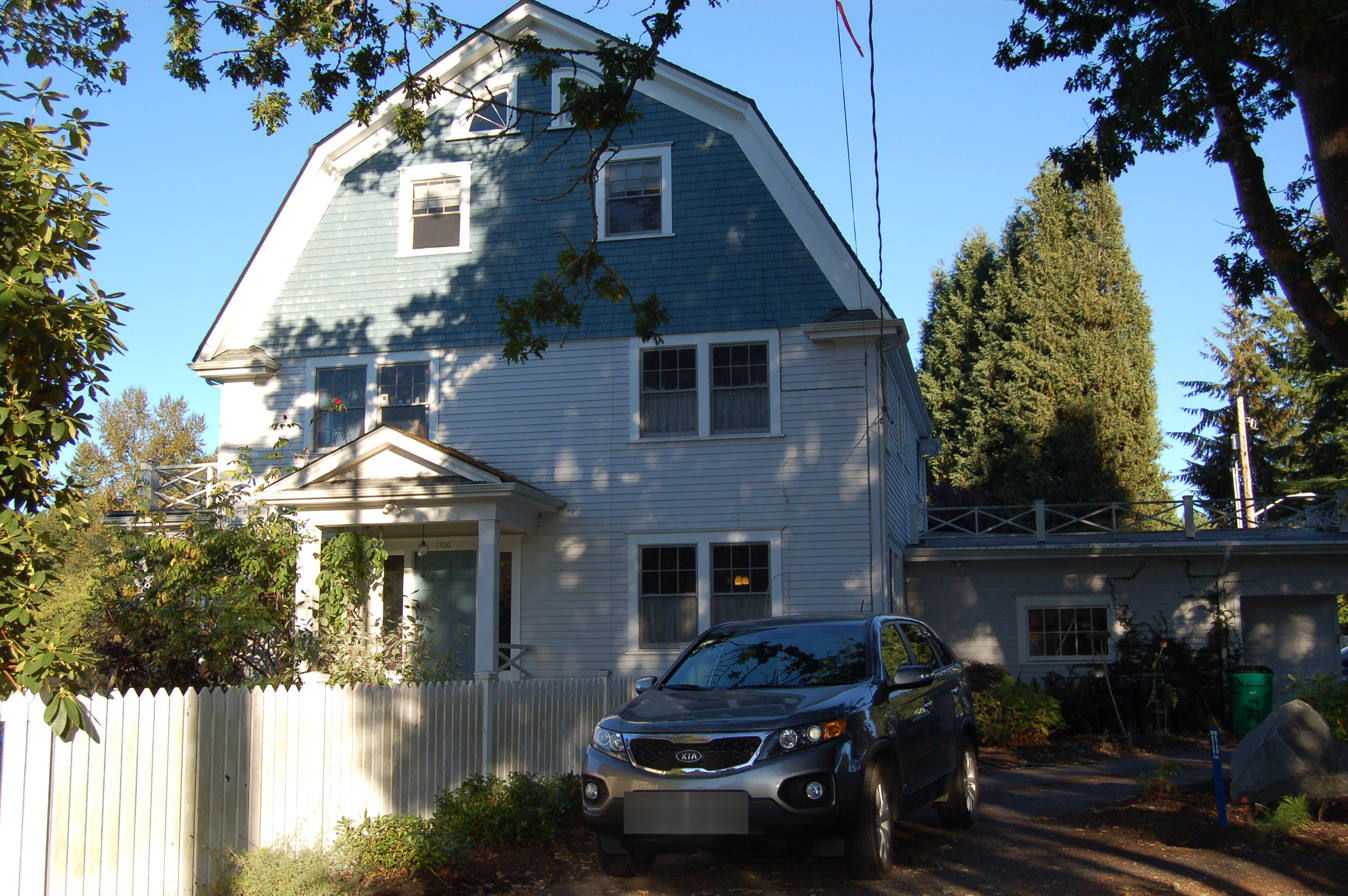

- Location within Washington (state)
- Location: Olympia, Washington
- Coordinates: 47°1′14.77″N 122°53′6.47″W
- Built: 1914
- Architect: Joseph Wohleb
- Architectural style: Dutch Colonial Revival
- NRHP reference No.: 78002779
- Added to NRHP: May 22, 1978

Cloverfields Dairy Farm was a model dairy farm located in Olympia, Washington. Built by former Washington state pioneer Hazard Stevens after he returned to Olympia in 1914, today the farmhouse is listed on the National Register of Historic Places.

== About ==
After long careers in politics and the military, Hazard Stevens returned to Olympia from Boston, Massachusetts in 1914, determined to develop a large tract of land his father purchased in the 1850s.

The first commission in Olympia for architect Joseph Wohleb, the Cloverfields farmhouse still stands today at 1100 Carlyon Avenue SE. It was built in the Dutch Colonial Revival Style and is listed on the National Register of Historic Places.

In addition to the house, Cloverfields originally included a large barn and two silos. As the president of the Olympia Light and Power Company, Stevens utilized electricity extensively throughout Cloverfields, particularly in the electrified barn and milking machines. The Holstein cows he used were anomaly in the area, and were complemented by Stevens' extensive orchard and angora goats.

In 1949, 40 acres (160,000 m^{2}) of the Cloverfields Dairy Farm in Southeast Olympia was purchased by the Olympia School District. Today it is the location of the current Olympia High School.

== See also ==
- History of Olympia, Washington
