= American Legion Hall (Olympia, Washington) =

- U.S. National Register of Historic Places
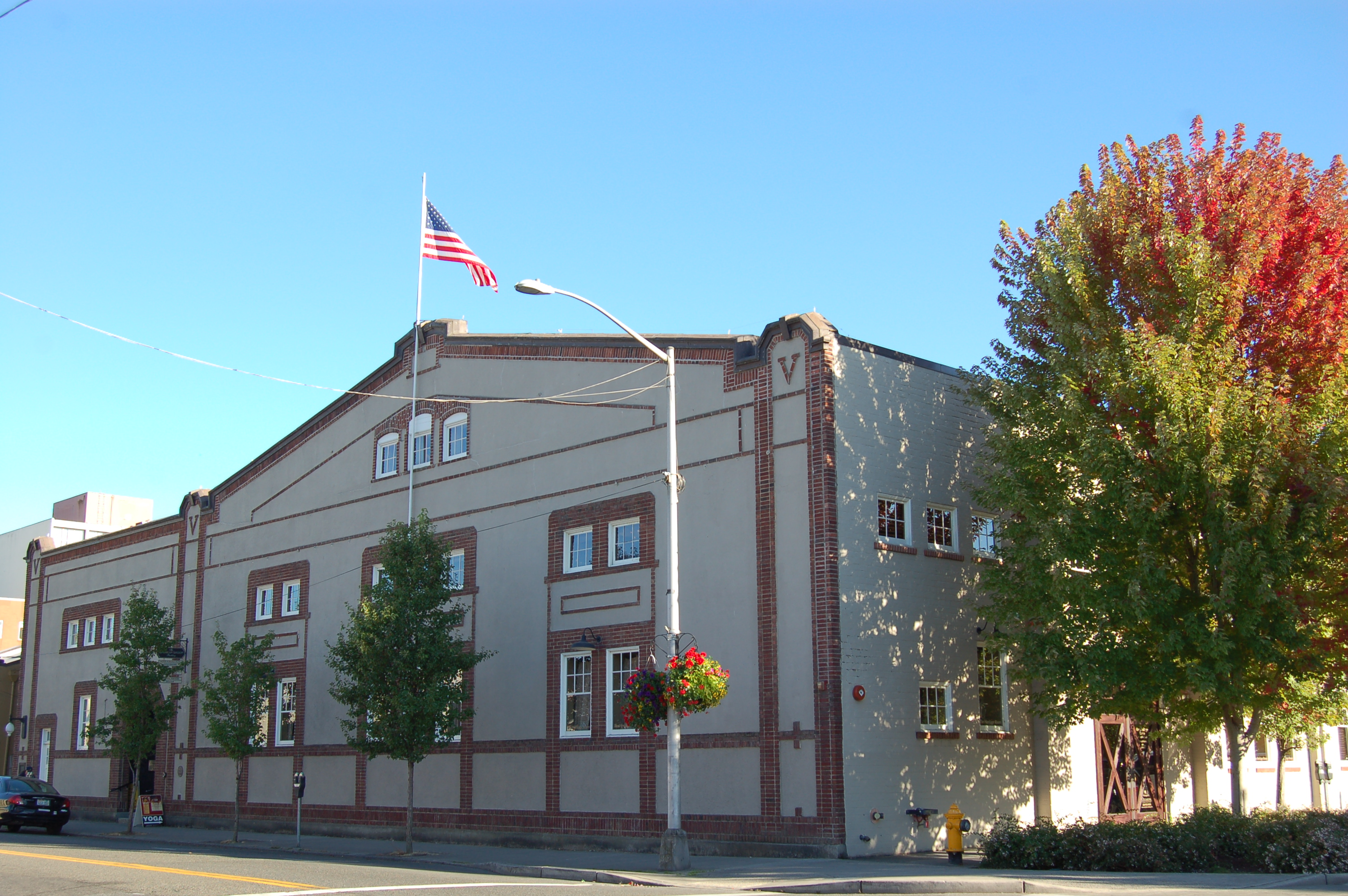
- Interactive map of Building location
- Location: 219 W. Legion Way, Olympia, Washington
- Coordinates: 47°02′34″N 122°54′13″W
- Area: less than one acre
- Built: 1921
- Architect: Wohleb, Joseph
- MPS: Downtown Olympia MRA
- NRHP reference No.: 87000871
- Added to NRHP: June 17, 1987

American Legion Hall is a historic building and meeting hall in Olympia, Washington. It was built in 1921 and listed on the National Register of Historic Places in 1987. The concrete, stucco and brick structure was designed by Joseph Wohleb.

The building was dedicated on Armistice Day, November 11, 1921. Between September 1939 and March 1946, an approx. 8,500 square feet (790 m^{2}) ice rink was set up on the first floor, hosting many events and festivals.
