= Washington State Capitol Conservatory =

Former greenhouse in Washington, United States

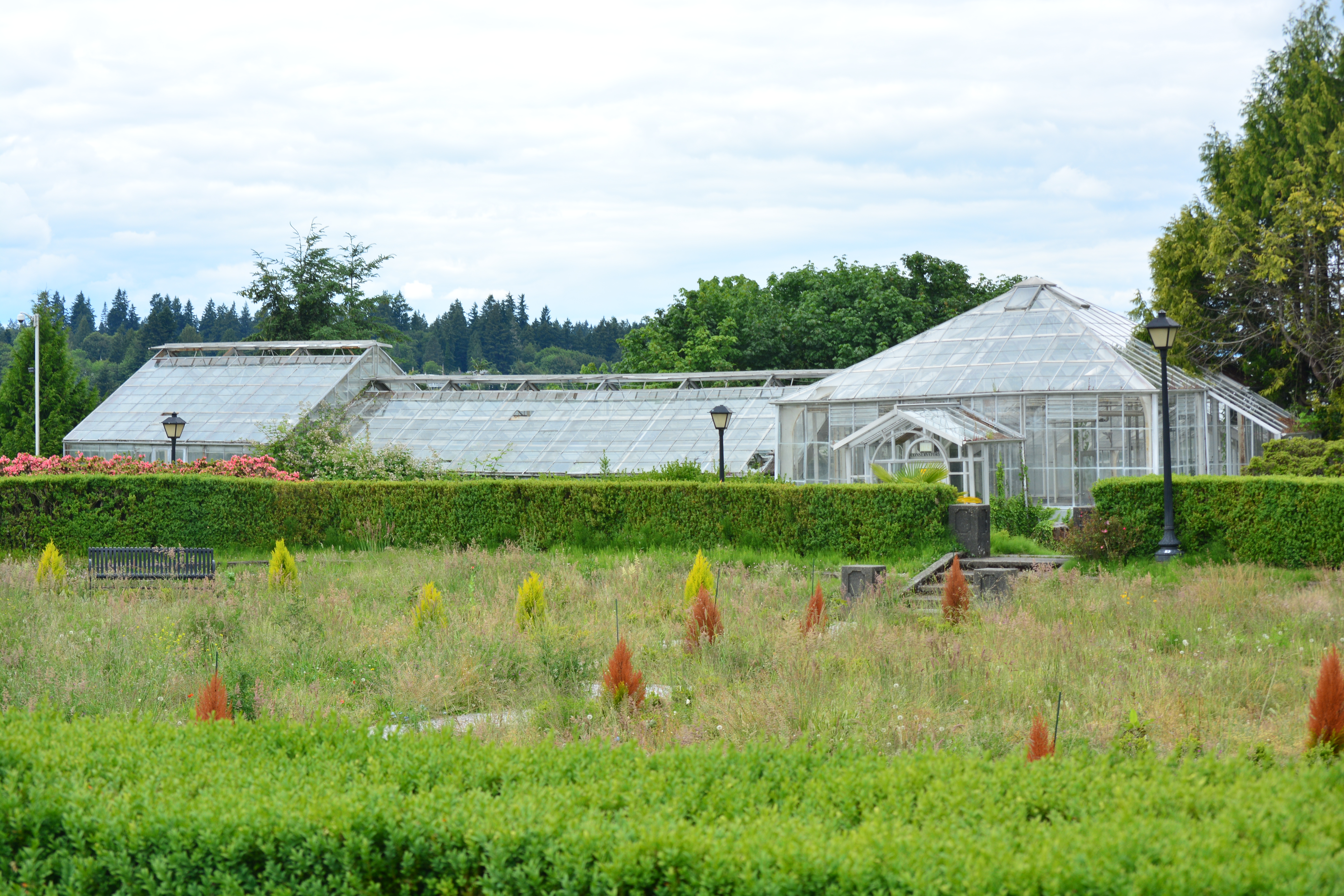
- Former conservatory with sunken gardens in the foreground.
- Interactive map of Conservatory location
- Former names: Washington State Capitol Greenhouse

General information
- Type: Greenhouse
- Location: Washington State Capitol campus, 1115 Water Street, Olympia, Washington, United States
- Coordinates: 47.0377°N 122.9037°W
- Construction started: 1938
- Opened: 1939
- Renovated: 1976
- Closed: 2008
- Cost: $25,000
- Owner: State of Washington Department of Enterprise Services

Technical details
- Floor count: 2
- Floor area: 11,300 sq ft (1,050 m^{2}) incl. basement shops

Design and construction
- Architect: Joseph Wohleb

References
- Some building structural data from State of Washington DES

The Washington State Capitol Conservatory was a greenhouse on the grounds of the Washington State Capitol in Olympia, Washington. It was funded $25,000 in 1938, designed by architect Joseph Wohleb, and built in 1939 as a Works Project Administration project.

In the 1990s, the greenhouse was noted to have foundation damage from soil settling of up to 65-foot (20 m) deep fill on which it was built. A 1995 report indicated that there was fear of a landslide causing catastrophe to the building, built next to a steep ravine where "a number of springs and wet areas were observed" (Olympia is noted for both its rainy climate and its artesian springs). Heritage Park's hillside trail climbs from Capitol Lake to a landing containing the Law Enforcement Memorial, adjacent to the conservatory.

Due to safety concerns stemming from the settling, the conservatory was closed in 2008 and the building was demolished between 2020 and 2021. For a time it was used to store the Chief Shelton Story Pole (totem pole) after it was taken down in 2010.

Until its closure, it was open to the public and was an attraction for visitors to the State Capitol.

== Capitol gardens ==
The gardens and grounds at the Capitol campus were filled with plants grown in the conservatory. Over 70,000 flowers and plants each year were grown there in the 1950s.

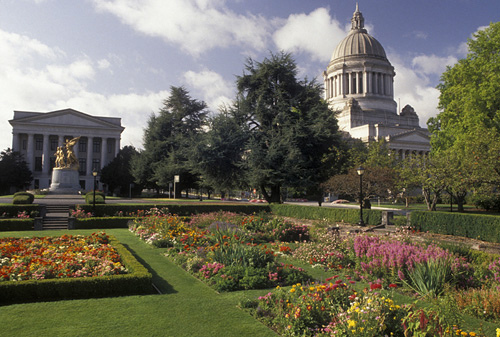
Sunken garden outside the conservatory (looking south towards Insurance Building and State Capitol)

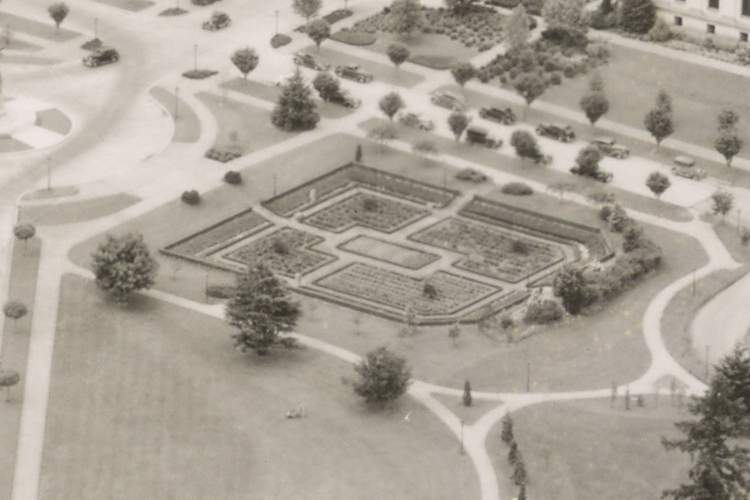
Sunken gardens in 1938
