= Olympia Film Society =

Nonprofit arts organization

- Formation: 1980
- Type: Nonprofit
- Location: Olympia, Washington
- Affiliations: Olympia Film Festival
- Website: www.olympiafilmsociety.org

The Olympia Film Society (OFS) is a 501(c)(3) nonprofit arts organization in Olympia, Washington, United States. Founded in 1980, the OFS shows independent, international, and classic films year-round. It also offers special live music and comedy performances and produces the Olympia Film Festival, which attracts 5,000–7,000 attendees each year. The OFS welcomes members and non-member patrons to the historic Capitol Theater, of which it has been the sole tenant and caretaker since 1986.

Marked by a steady growth in members, volunteers, and regular film screenings, OFS grew from a handful of film lovers renting films once a month to an organization with over 2,000 members.

== History ==
The OFS was formed in 1980, when a dozen people gathered at the old Washington School on Legion Way to watch the first show, The 39 Steps and Foreign Correspondent, a double-feature tribute to Alfred Hitchcock.

In 1981, the OFS moved to Capitol City Studios and purchased a 16-millimeter projector.

In 1983, the OFS began its Olympia Film Festival (OFF), a 10-day event featuring of films, filmmakers, special performances, discussion panels, and educational workshops. It took place at the State Theater. OFS membership jumped from 60 to 600.

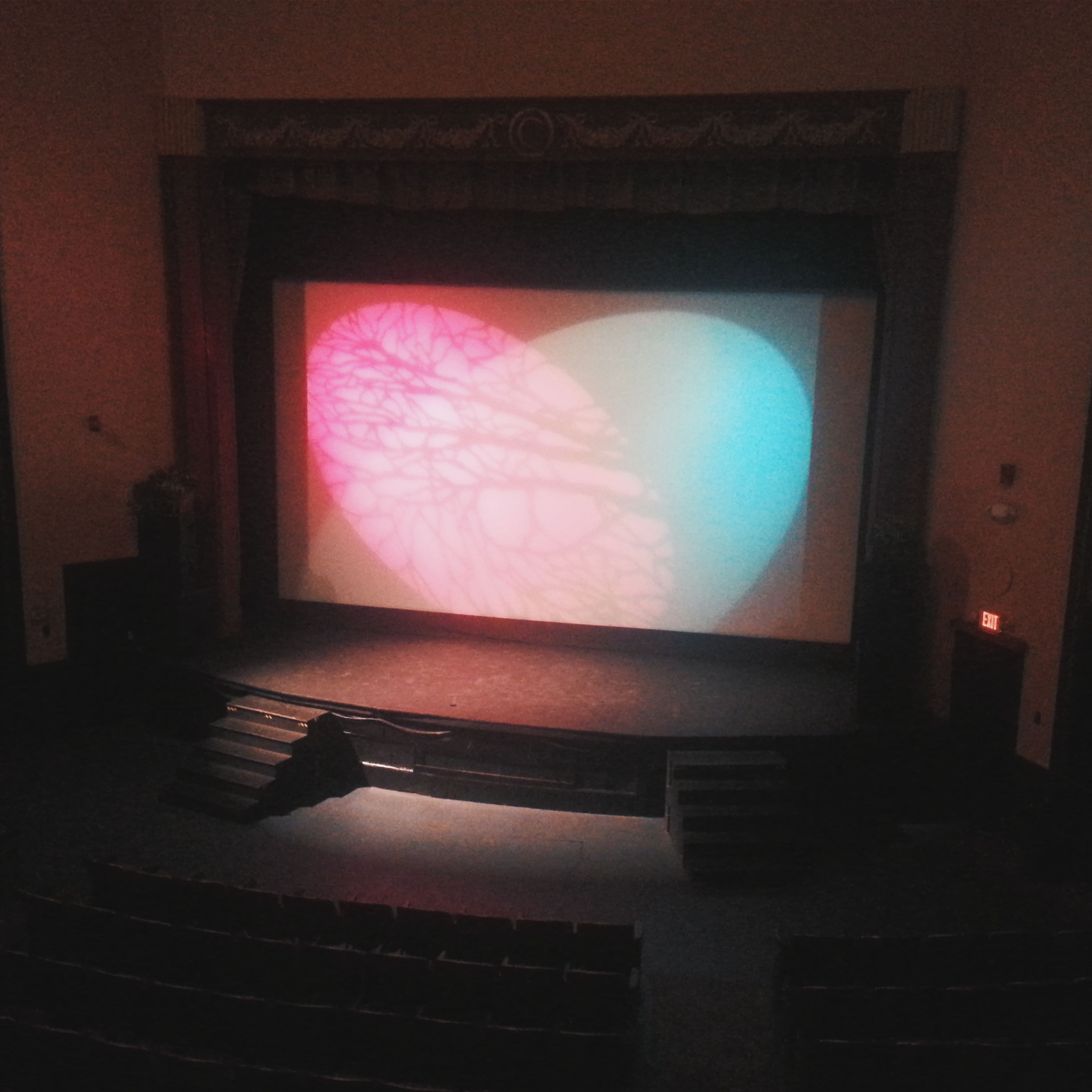
The stage and screen at Capitol Theater, Olympia, Washington

In 1986, the OFS started showing films at the Capitol Theater, built in 1924. To accompany the silent classic Pandora's Box (1929), Timothy Brock conducted the Olympia Chamber Orchestra's world premiere of his original film score.

In 1988, the OFS took on its first major capital expenditure to buy a new 35mm projection system.

=== 1990s ===
In 1990, the OFS found a home in the 770-seat Capitol Theater, signing the lease in time for the November Film Festival. ArtsWalk, Olympia's biannual downtown arts festival, began that year to coincide with the opening of the Olympia Film Festival.

In 1992, the Northwest Premiere of Disney's Aladdin brought unprecedented attention to the ninth Olympia Film Festival. The film was presented by Michael Swofford, a native of Olympia and an animator who worked on the film.

In 1993, the production wing of the Olympia Film Society, the Olympia Film Ranch, was founded. The Film Ranch began providing workshops and equipment rental to OFS members.

In 1997, opening night of the 14th Olympia Film Festival introduced the first phase of a new Dolby sound system, 12 new JBL surround speakers and a Dolby CP 500 cinema processor. Guests included world-renowned animators The Brothers Quay and the cinematographer Michael Spiller.

In 1998, the After Quartet packed the Capitol Theater with their rousing score to Fritz Lang's Metropolis (1927). The 15th OFF included the producer Ted Hope, the opening night filmmaker Hilary Brougher and the film scholar Ray Carney.

In 1999, the Capitol Theater went digital, thanks to a generous upgrade to the sound system courtesy of Dolby Digital. OFF16 urged Rick Schmidt (author of Feature Filmmaking at Used Car Prices) to dust off his old 16mm prints for a retrospective that was a favorite with audiences. San Francisco's Sprocket Ensemble performed a feature-length program of their live scores to short contemporary animation. A new print of Orson Welles' The Trial (1962) closed the festival.

=== 2000s ===
In 2000, Ray Carney returned to present a retrospective of the films of Robert Bresson. OFF17 presented its most comprehensive series of panel discussions and guest seminars. All Freakin' Night broke the previous records of attendance and bad taste for the classic all-night horror film marathon. For several years, in celebration of Halloween, the Olympia Film Society has put on an "All Freakin' Night" horror-movie marathon each October.

In 2001, the OFS and the Capitol Theater survived the 2001 Nisqually earthquake, though the theater's ceiling plaster was damaged. Operations resumed after six weeks of repairs. With a completed Dolby system and extensive renovations, OFF18 began with a pre-festival screening of Mulholland Drive (2001) and ended with a sold-out screening of Amélie (2001). Also in 2001, the six-day Yoyo a Gogo music festival featuring over 50 bands, "ranging from punk rock to electronic to folk", was held at the Capitol Theatre.

In 2002, the OFS acquired its own video projector, broadening opportunities for media exhibition. The OFF19 welcomed underground legends the Kuchar Brothers (John Waters' self-proclaimed single biggest inspiration) for a career retrospective. Bob and David from Mr. Show hosted a once-in-a-lifetime presentation of one of their guilty pleasures. The festival closed with a screening of Real Women Have Curves (2002).

In October 2005, the Regal Foundation offered to hold a one-day fundraiser for the Olympia Film Society, prior to the Grand Opening of their Martin Village (Lacey) Regal Cinemas. All $1 ticket sales and $1 popcorn and soda sales were donated to OFS to the tune of $22,966.89.

In 2008, the Capitol Theater marquee, a 1940 addition, was replaced with a replica, revealing stained glass muses that had "been hidden for over 70 years".

In 2010, the OFS officially bought the Capitol Theater, after having leased the theater since 1990.

In 2013, the 30th annual OFF featured more that 50 films, including a 3D production of Steven Spielberg's Jaws (1975), along with live music entertainment from musician Kathleen Hanna, band The Julie Ruin, and others.

In 2017, the OFS received a Washington Heritage Capital Projects Fund grant to restore the exterior of the theater.

During the last week of 2025, the OFS showed a variety of films at the Capitol Theater, including screenings of Fiddler on the Roof (1971), Batman Returns (1992), Elf (2003), Train Dreams (2025), and Bugonia (2025).

=== Offerings ===
The Olympia Film Society provides various offerings through the Capitol Theater:

- Weekly film series — showings of mainstream and award-winning independent, international, and classic films
- Special/limited showings — one-time-only film screenings with question-and-answer sessions with visiting filmmakers
- Annual Olympia Film Festival — a 10-day festival celebrating film, supported by volunteers and local businesses
- Live events — performances by musicians, comedians, theatre groups, and mixed-media performance artists
- Art in the Mezzanine — a space for local artists to present their work, including the annual holiday arts and crafts fair
- All Freakin' Night — a horror-movie marathon held each October
- Reduced rentals — use of the theater is offered at a reduced rate for local, community-based non-profit organizations' fundraising and outreach events

=== Recognition ===
In 2009, the Olympia Film Society was presented with the Historic Preservation Award for replacing a "rusty and dilapidated" 1940s marquee of the Capitol Theater with a newly fabricated replica, opening the facade to public view.

In 2018, the Olympia Film Festival was named on MovieMaker's 25 Coolest Film Festivals in the World list.

In January 2025, the OFS received the Stewardship Award from the Olympia Historical Society and the Bigelow House Museum to celebrate 100 years of the Capitol Theater.
