= Elks Building (Olympia, Washington) =

- U.S. National Register of Historic Places
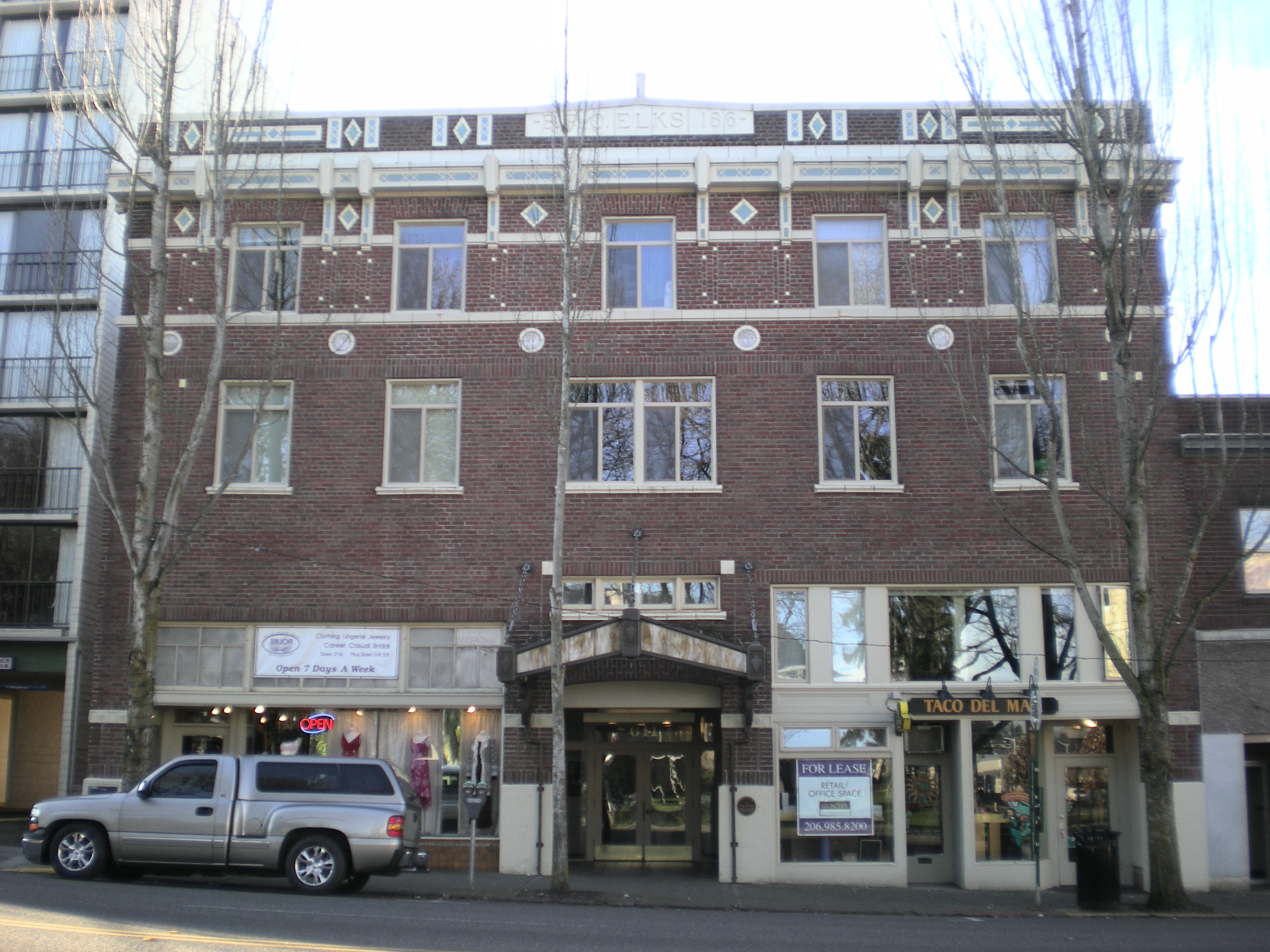

- Location within Washington (state)
- Location: 607--613 S. Capitol Way, Olympia, Washington
- Coordinates: 47°2′34″N 122°54′2″W
- Area: less than one acre
- Built: 1919
- Architect: Joseph Wohleb
- Architectural style: Vernacular Commercial
- MPS: Downtown Olympia MRA
- NRHP reference No.: 88000690
- Added to NRHP: April 21, 1988

The Elks Building in Olympia, Washington is a concrete building with a brick veneer that was built in 1919. It was built for the Elks local chapter that had been formed in 1891. It was listed on the National Register of Historic Places in 1988.

A 1985 historic buildings survey described it as the "only historic building built exclusively for a fraternal lodge still standing in Olympia."
