= Bremerton Elks Temple Lodge No. 1181 Building =

Historic place in Bremerton, Washington, US

- U.S. National Register of Historic Places
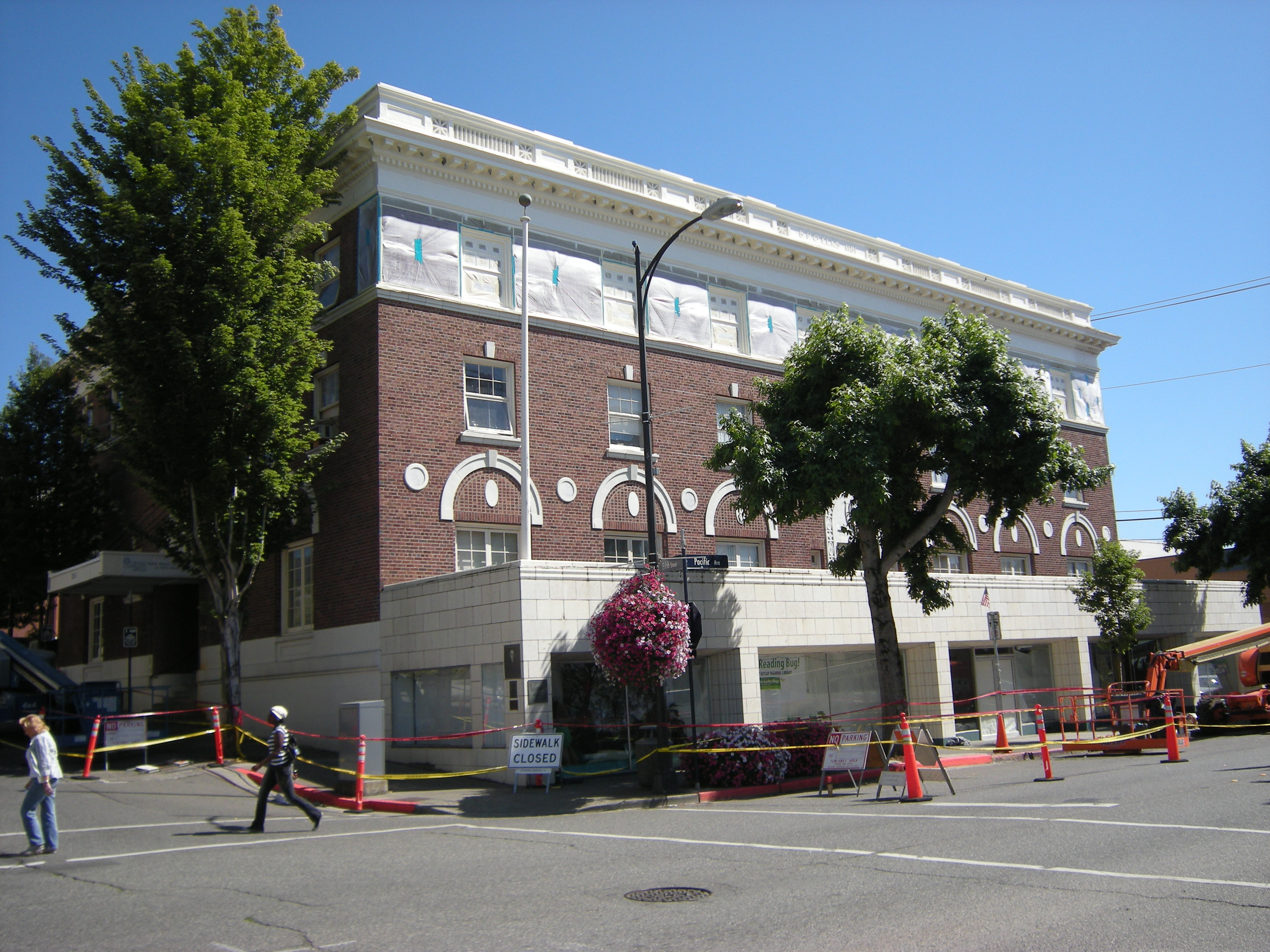
- Building in 2008, with sidewalk closed and sheeting over upper facade

- Location within Washington (state)
- Location: 285 Fifth St., Bremerton, Washington
- Coordinates: 47°34′0″N 122°37′31″W
- Area: less than one acre
- Built: 1920; 1947–48
- Architect: Joseph Wohleb (1920); Williams-Davis & Associates (1947–48)
- Architectural style: Moderne, Classical Revival
- NRHP reference No.: 95000192
- Added to NRHP: March 3, 1995

The Bremerton Elks Temple Lodge No. 1181 Building is an historic club building at 285 Fifth Street in Bremerton, Washington. It was built in 1920 and renovated in the 1940s. It was listed on the National Register of Historic Places in 1995. It is now known as Catholic Charities' Max Hale Center.

== History ==
The Benevolent and Protective Order of Elks Lodge 1181 in Bremerton, Washington was established on January 7, 1910. Initially, the group met in a building it rented from F. A. Harlow. The chapter received its charter on July 15, 1910.

In 1911, the lodge purchased property on Fifth Street and Washington Avenue to build an Elks Temple. However, instead of construction, the lodge moved to the Dietz Building at Fourth Street and Pacific Avenue on July 15, 1915, where it resided for six years. The lodge sold the Fifth and Washington lot and purchased a second property at corner of Pacific Avenue and Fifth in March 1919 for $18,000.

The lodge held ground breaking ceremonies on January 26, 1920 and the temple's cornerstone was laid the next day. Finally, Bremerton Elks Temple Lodge No. 1181 Building was constructed on 285 Fifth Street for $168,358.53. It was financed by selling bonds to lodge members. It was dedicated on March 19, 1921.

In 1945, the lodge's membership had grown from its original 35 to 1,500,. in part because of a Naval shipyard that was located in Bremerton. In 1946, the lodge voted to spend $25,000 to renovate and $227,000 to expanded its temple. The work was completed in September 1947 and cost $360,000. President Harry S. Truman made a campaign speech from the building's balcony in 1948.

However, in 1966 the lodge began working on creating a new temple that could accommodate its membership. In 1977, the lodge purchased ten acres for $100,000 for a new temple that was dedicated on December 8, 1977. The former lodge building was sold for $310,000. It was rented, piecemeal, to various tennants.

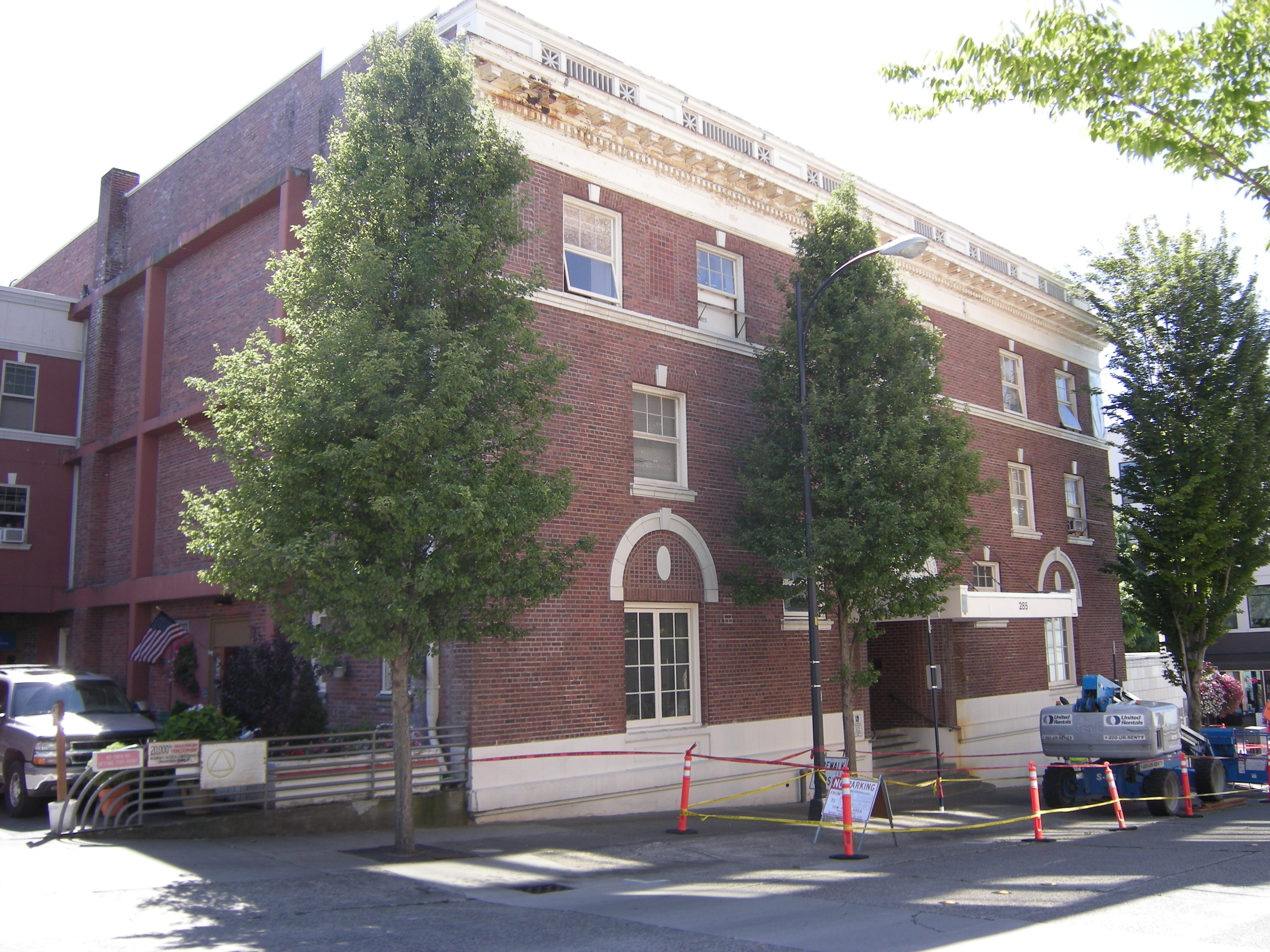
Catholic Charities' Max Hale Center, originally Bremerton Elks Temple Lodge No. 1181 Building, 2008

The former lodge was listed on the National Register of Historic Places in 1995 as the Bremerton Elks Temple Lodge No. 1181 Building.

In 2010, a center to serve at-risk youths was proposed as a use for the building, which was empty on at least its first floor. There was some community opposition to the proposed center, which was to be run by Catholic Community Services and Catholic Housing Services. What was eventually developed was 53 units of low-income permanent housing, known as Catholic Charities' Max Hale Center.

== Architecture ==
Bremerton Elks Temple Lodge No. 1181 Building was constructed in a Classical Revival design by architect Joseph Wohleb of Olympia. It is a wood-frame building with a brick veneer on a concrete foundation, and has a sheet metal cornice. The building included club rooms, lodge rooms, club dining section, a club cafe, committee rooms, a lodge executive office, a gymnasium, a public hall, 28 sleeping room, two ladies reception room, a library, and a barber shop.

During 1947-48 it was enlarged and modified in the Moderne style, with design by William I. Williams, architect, and Clark M. Davis, engineer, of Williams-Davis & Associates in Bremerton. The general contractor was Solie Construction Co. of Bremerton. Part of the changes included added 2,300 square feet which included a reading room, a stag lounge, and a billiard and pool room; moving the main entrance from Pacific Avenue to Fifth Street; in addition, a Payless Drug Store moved into commercial space facing on Pacific Avenue. A grand exterior staircase once fronted the building. This was removed when the current white cube of first-floor space in front of the building was constructed in the 1940s. The white cube space held a Payless Drug Store.

In the 1990s, the building underwent a $5.5 million renovation, becoming an apartment building.

== See also ==
- List of Elks buildings
- National Register of Historic Places listings in Kitsap County, Washington
