= Joseph Wohleb =

American architect

- Born: 1887; Waterbury, Connecticut
- Died: 1958 (aged 70–71)
- Occupation: Architect
- Children: Robert
- Practice: Wohleb and Wohleb (1946)

Joseph Henry Wohleb (1887–1958) was an American architect from Olympia, Washington.

== Biography ==
Wohleb was born in Waterbury, Connecticut and grew up in California, studying architecture at the University of California, Berkeley. He participated in repairs after the 1906 San Francisco earthquake, then worked in Nevada before moving to Olympia, Washington in 1911 to begin his practice; he is known for the design of classic motion picture theaters in the 1920s.

Wohleb was the designer of Cloverfields in Olympia, a farmhouse listed on the National Register of Historic Places. He also served as the architect for the Washington State Capitol Museum and other buildings on the Washington State Capitol Campus.

In 1946, Joseph Wohleb's son Robert joined him in the architecture business and the two worked in their firm, Wohleb and Wohleb. Together, they designed many notable buildings in Thurston County.

== Legacy ==
A number of Joseph's works and at least one of the partnership's works are listed on the U.S. National Register of Historic Places.

== Architectural works ==
- Jeffers Studio, (Note: A contributing property to the Olympia Downtown Historic District, listed on the National Register of Historic Places in 2007.) Olympia, Washington (1913, NRHP 1987)
- "Cloverfields" for Hazard Stevens, Olympia, Washington (1914, NRHP 1978)
- House for O. C. Hanson, (Note: A contributing property to the South Capitol Neighborhood Historic District, listed on the National Register of Historic Places in 1991.) Olympia, Washington (1914)
- House for John T. Otis, Olympia, Washington (1914)
- Olympia National Bank, Olympia, Washington (1914–15, NRHP 1987)
- Olympia Public Library, (Note: Designed in association with Blackwell & Baker of Seattle.) Olympia, Washington (1914, NRHP 1982)
- House for Charles H. Springer, Olympia, Washington (1917)
- Elks Building, Olympia, Washington (1919, NRHP 1988)
- Elks Lodge, (Note: A contributing property to the Centralia Downtown Historic District, listed on the National Register of Historic Places in 2003.) Centralia, Washington (1919)
- Bremerton Elks Temple, Bremerton, Washington (1920, NRHP 1995)
- House for Emmett N. Parker, Olympia, Washington (1920)
- American Legion Hall, Olympia, Washington (1921, NRHP 1987)
- Centralia City Hall, Centralia, Washington (1921–23)
- House for M. L. McCully, Olympia, Washington (1921)
- Capital National Bank Building, (Note: Designed in association with the Seattle office of A. E. Doyle of Portland, Oregon.) Olympia, Washington (1922)
- House for Clarence J. Lord, Olympia, Washington (1923, NRHP 1981)
- Lincoln School (former), Olympia, Washington (1923)
- House for Henry McCleary, Olympia, Washington (1923, NRHP 1978)
- Capitol Theater, Olympia, Washington (1924)
- House for Joseph Wohleb, (Note: Wohleb's own home, located at 122 21st Avenue SW directly across the street from his houses for C. J. Lord and Henry McCleary.) Olympia, Washington (1926)
- Mason County Courthouse, Shelton, Washington (1929–30, NRHP 2013)
- Thurston County Courthouse, Olympia, Washington (1929–30, NRHP 1981)
- Olympia Press Building, Olympia, Washington (1930)
- John A. Cherberg Building of the Washington State Capitol, (Note: Designed to be in conformity with the plans and specifications of Wilder & White, architects of the Legislative Building. Formerly an office building for the departments of Public Lands and Social Security, now a Senate office building. A contributing property to the Washington State Capitol Historic District, listed on the National Register of Historic Places in 1979.) Olympia, Washington (1937)
- House for F. W. Schmidt, Olympia, Washington (1938, NRHP 1995)
- Washington State Capitol Conservatory, Olympia, Washington (1938–39)
- House for Walter Draham, Olympia, Washington (1940)
- Rockway-Leland Building, Olympia, Washington (1941)
- Georgia-Pacific Plywood Company Office, (Note: Designed in association with Naramore, Bain, Brady & Johanson of Seattle.) Olympia, Washington (1952, NRHP 2007)
- Bay View Brewery, Seattle, Washington (no date, NRHP 2013)
- Rainier Brewery addition, Seattle, Washington (no date)

== Gallery of architectural works ==
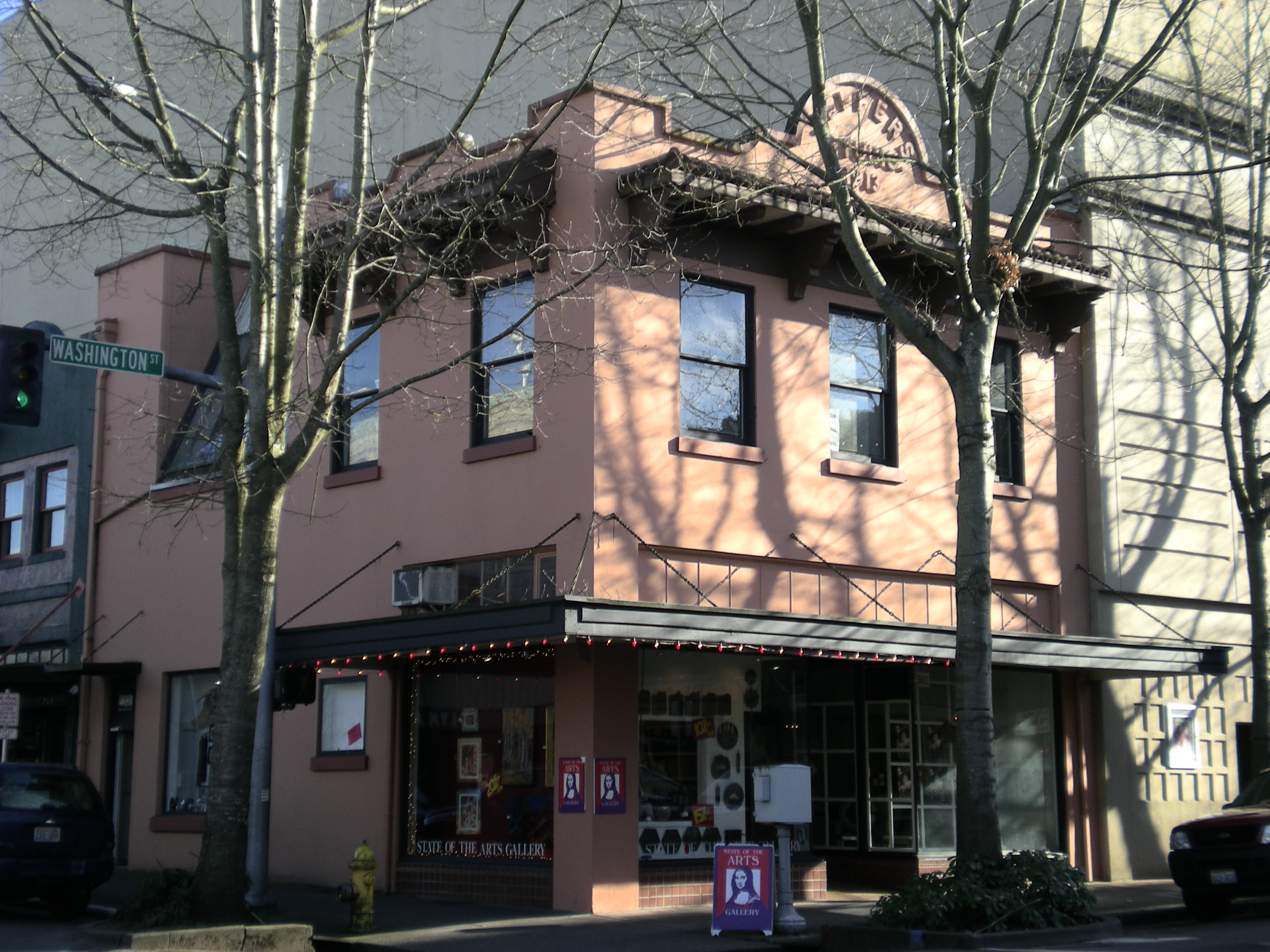
Jeffers Studio, Olympia, Washington, 1913.

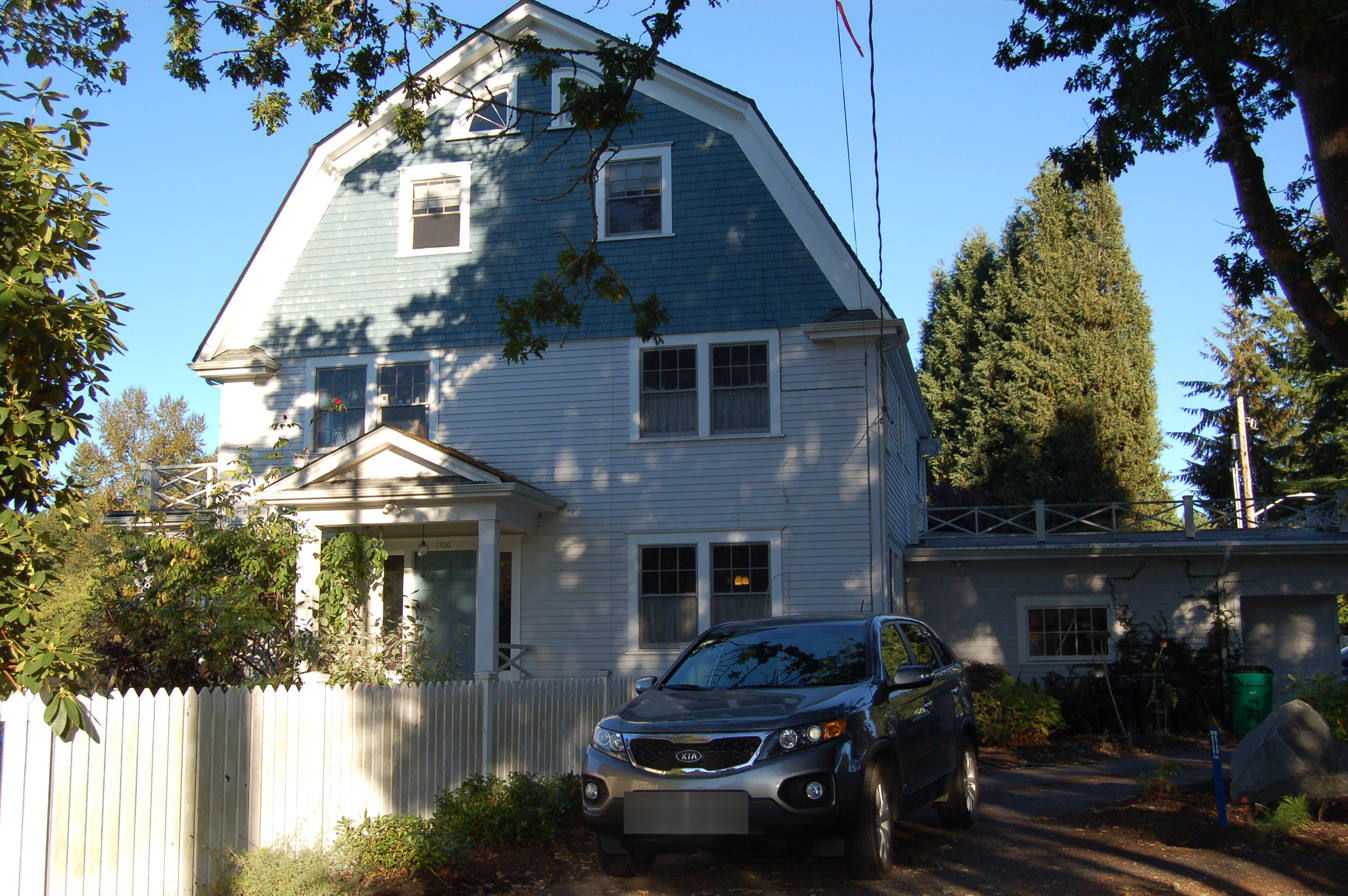
Cloverfields, Olympia, Washington, 1914.

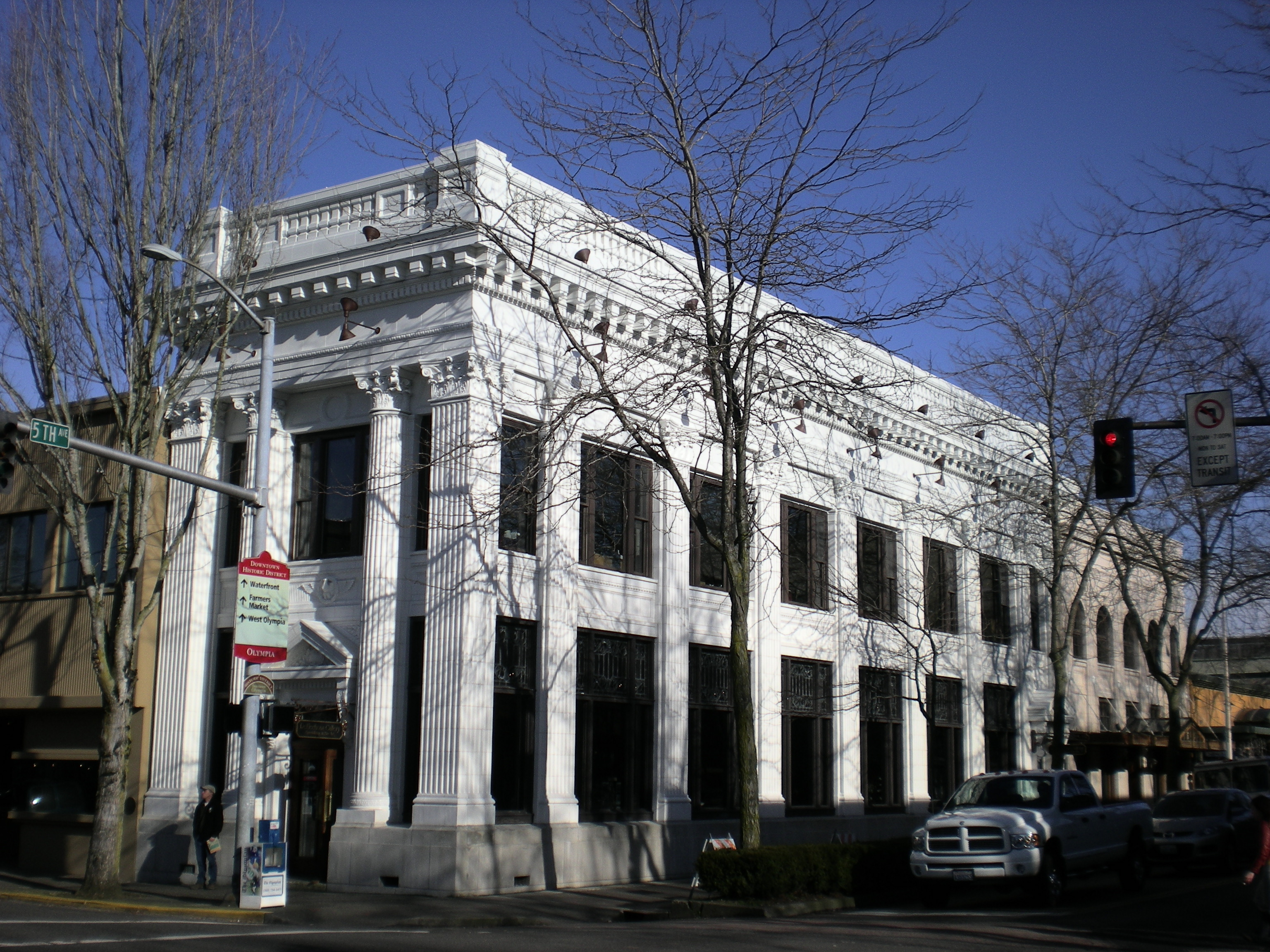
Olympia National Bank, Olympia, Washington, 1914-15.

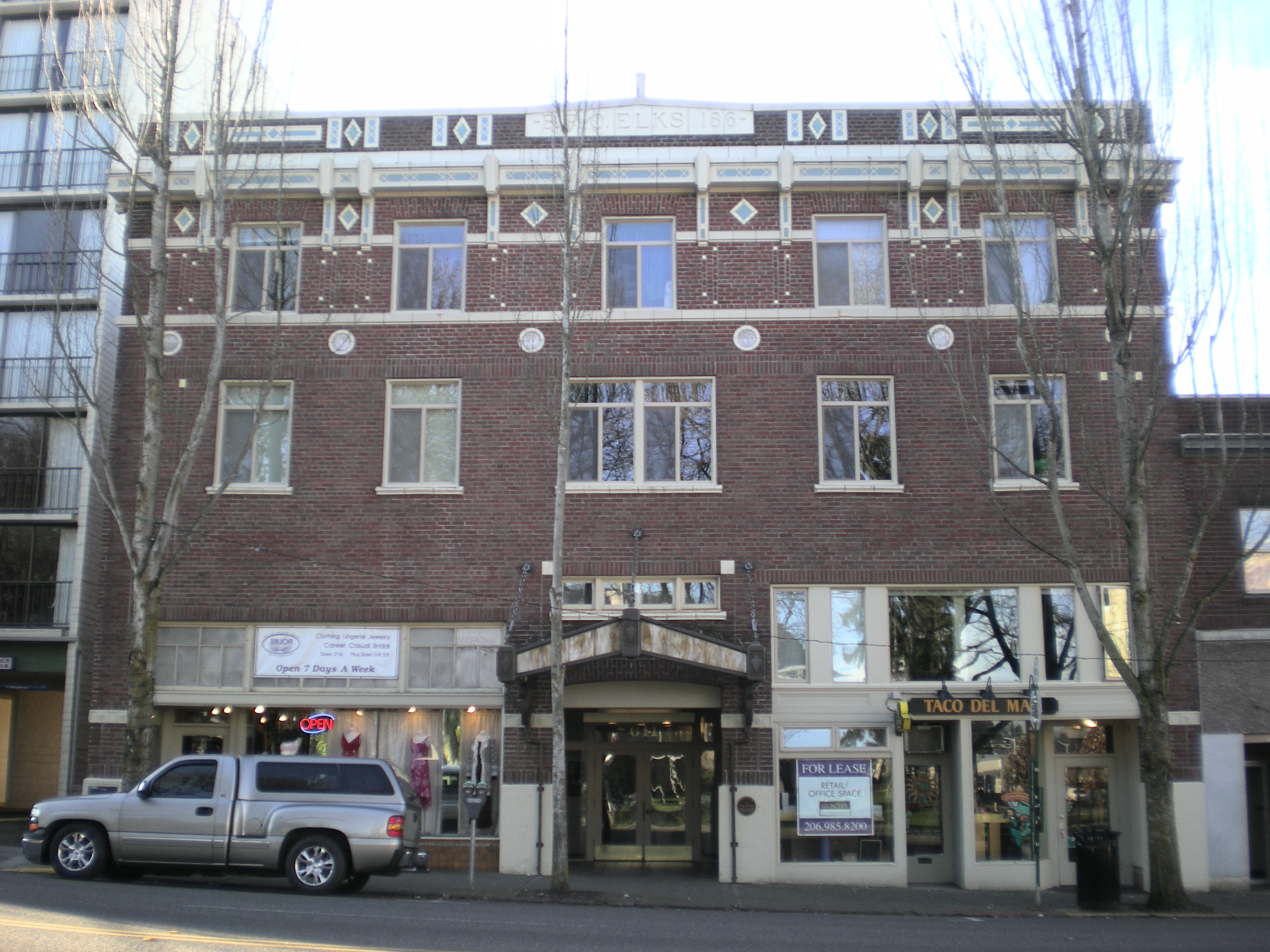
Elks Building, Olympia, Washington, 1919.

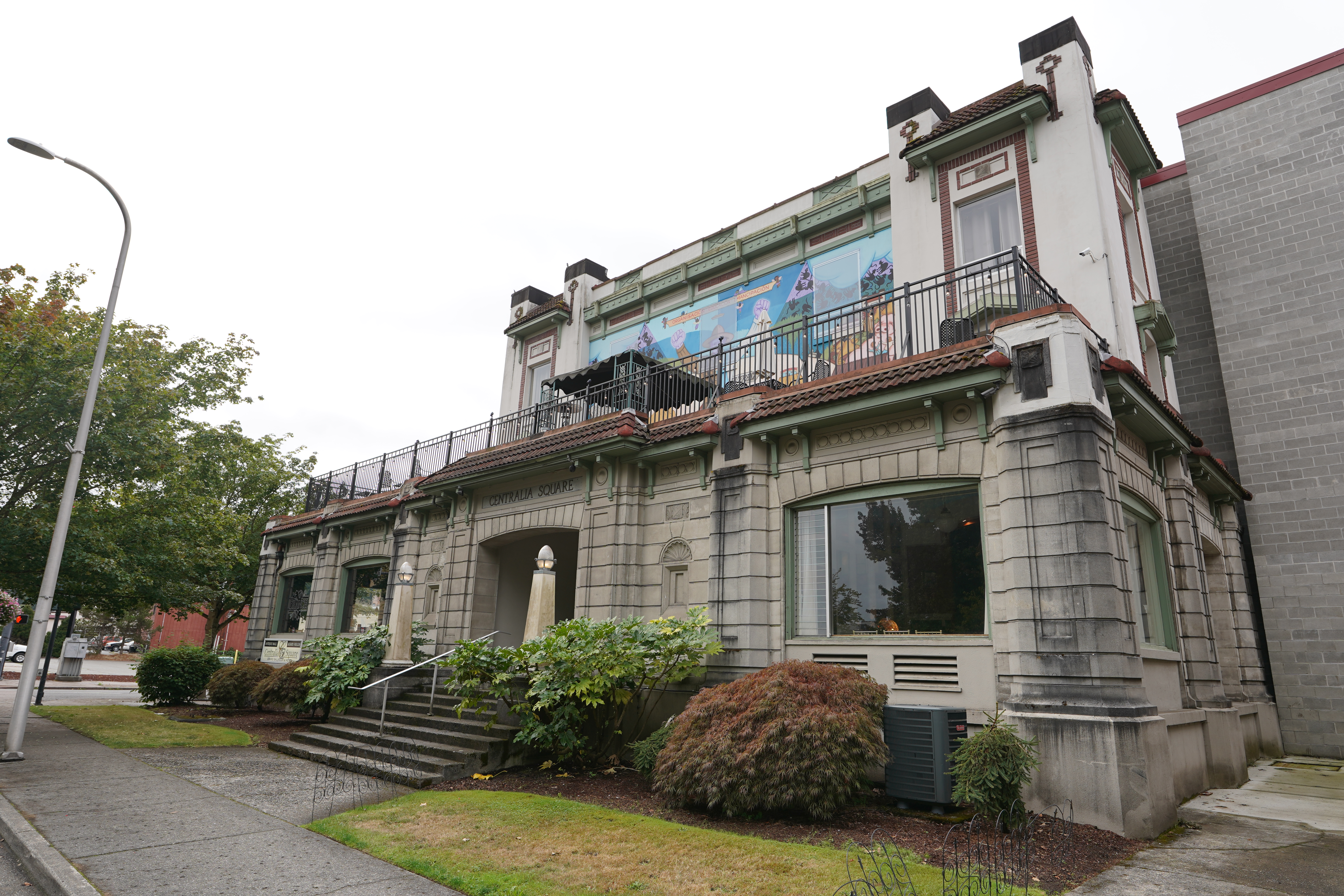
Elks Lodge, Centralia, Washington, 1919.

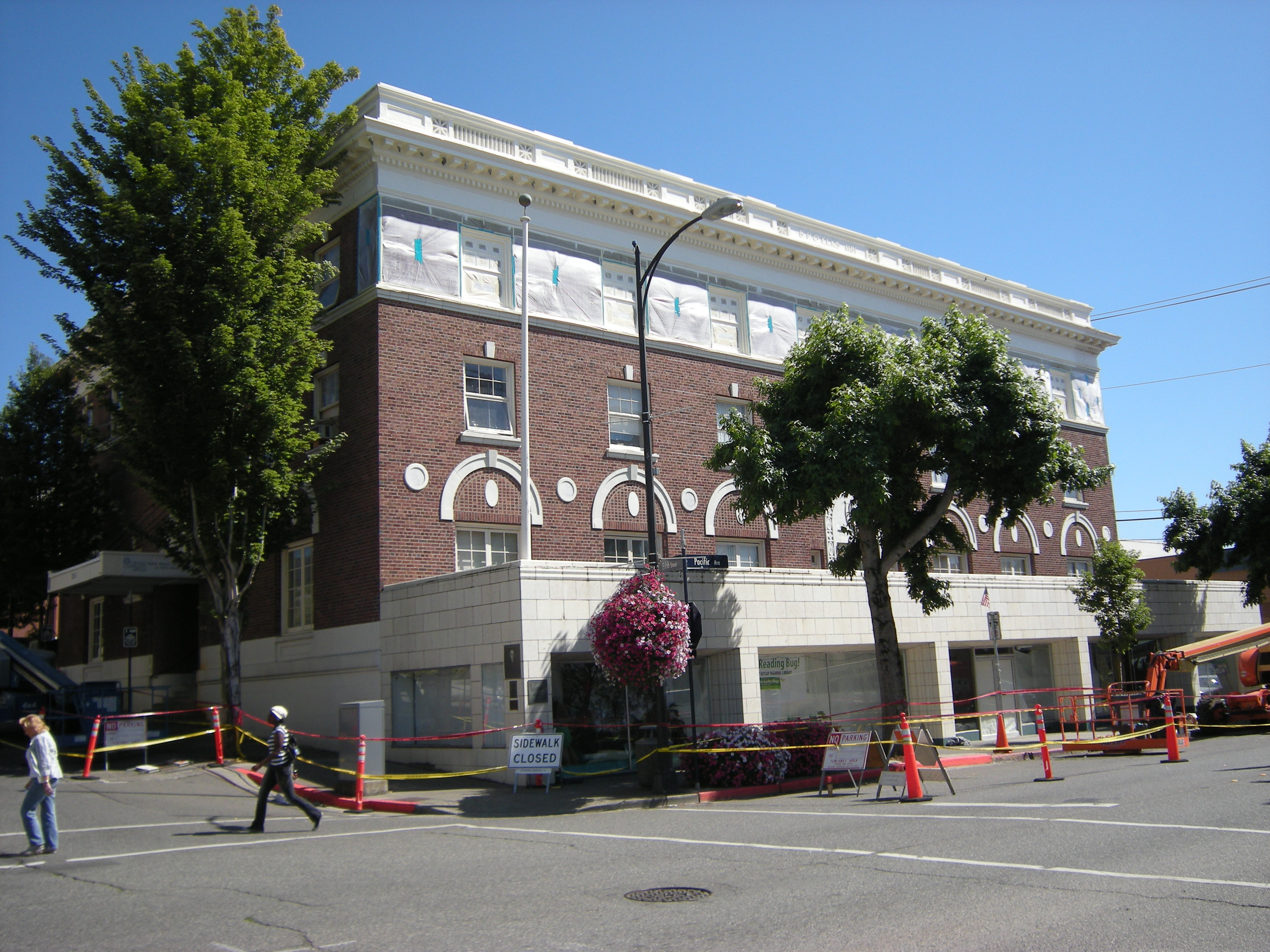
Bremerton Elks Temple, Bremerton, Washington, 1920.

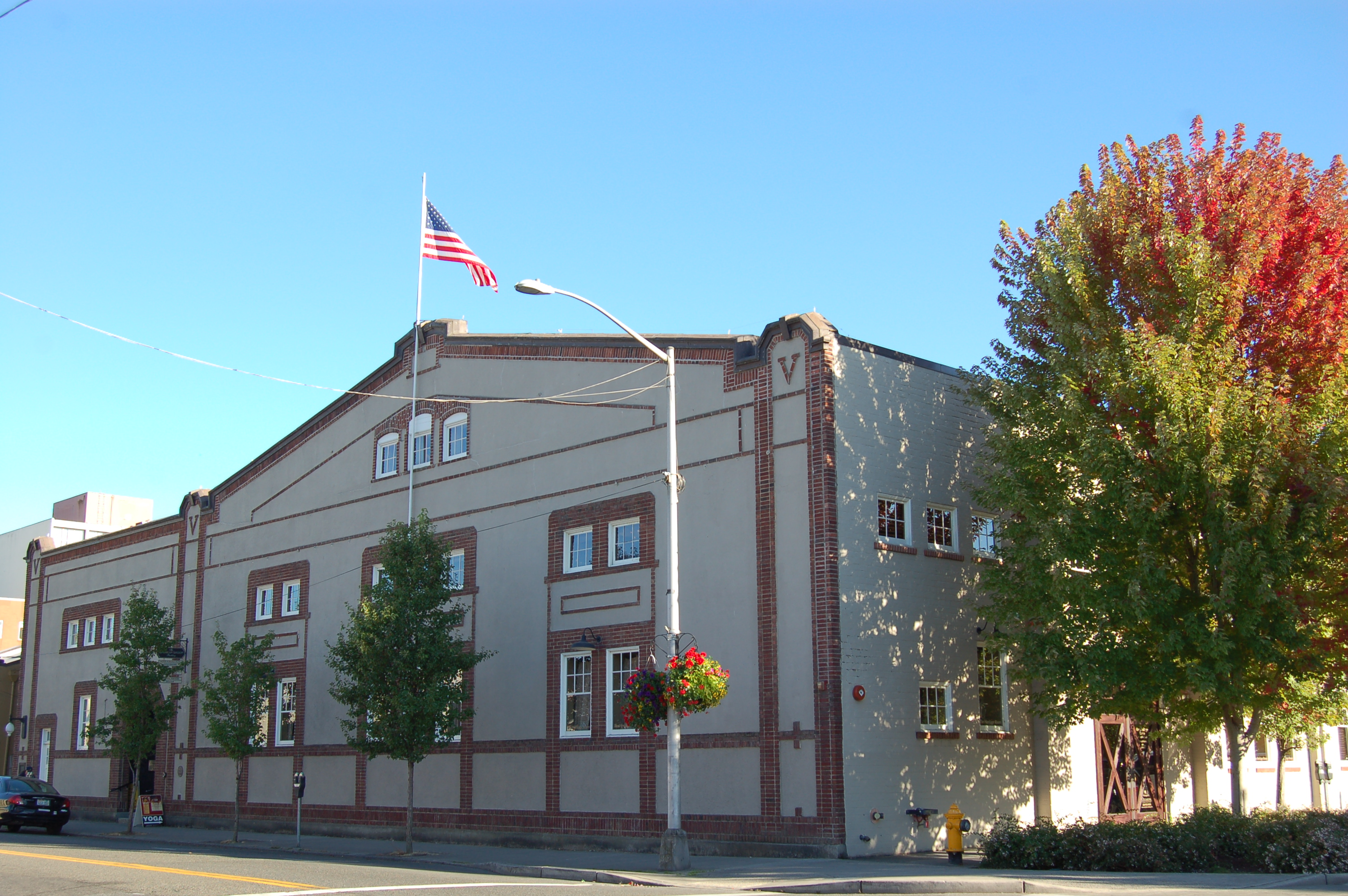
American Legion Hall, Olympia, Washington, 1921.

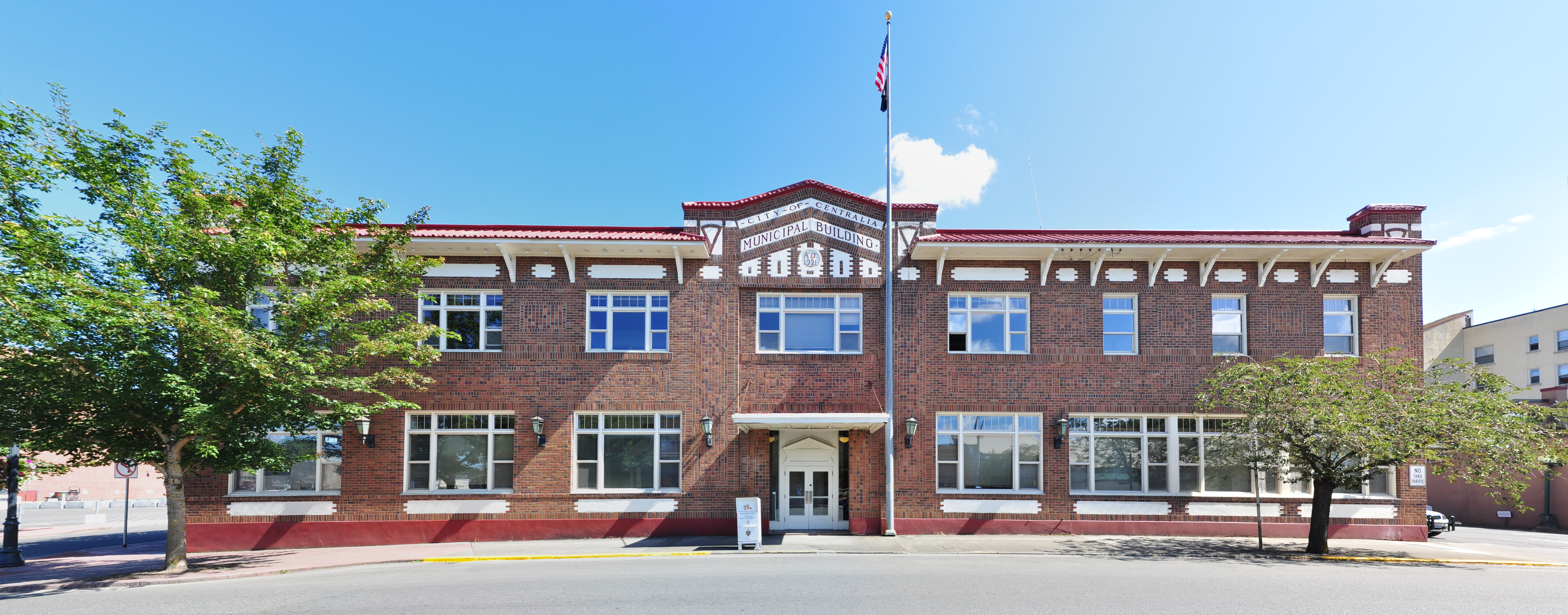
Centralia City Hall, Centralia, Washington, 1921-23.

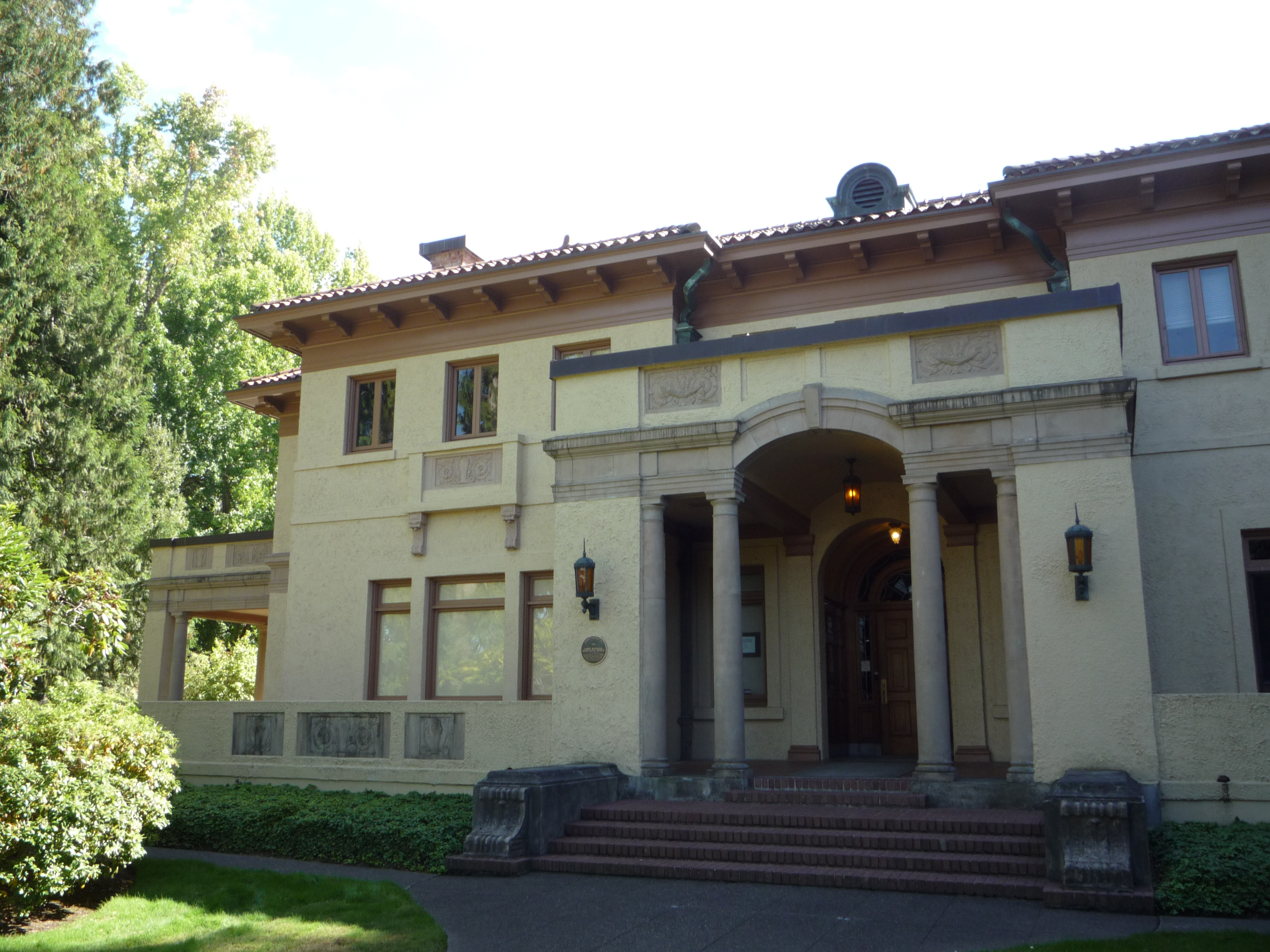
House for Clarence J. Lord, Olympia, Washington, 1923.

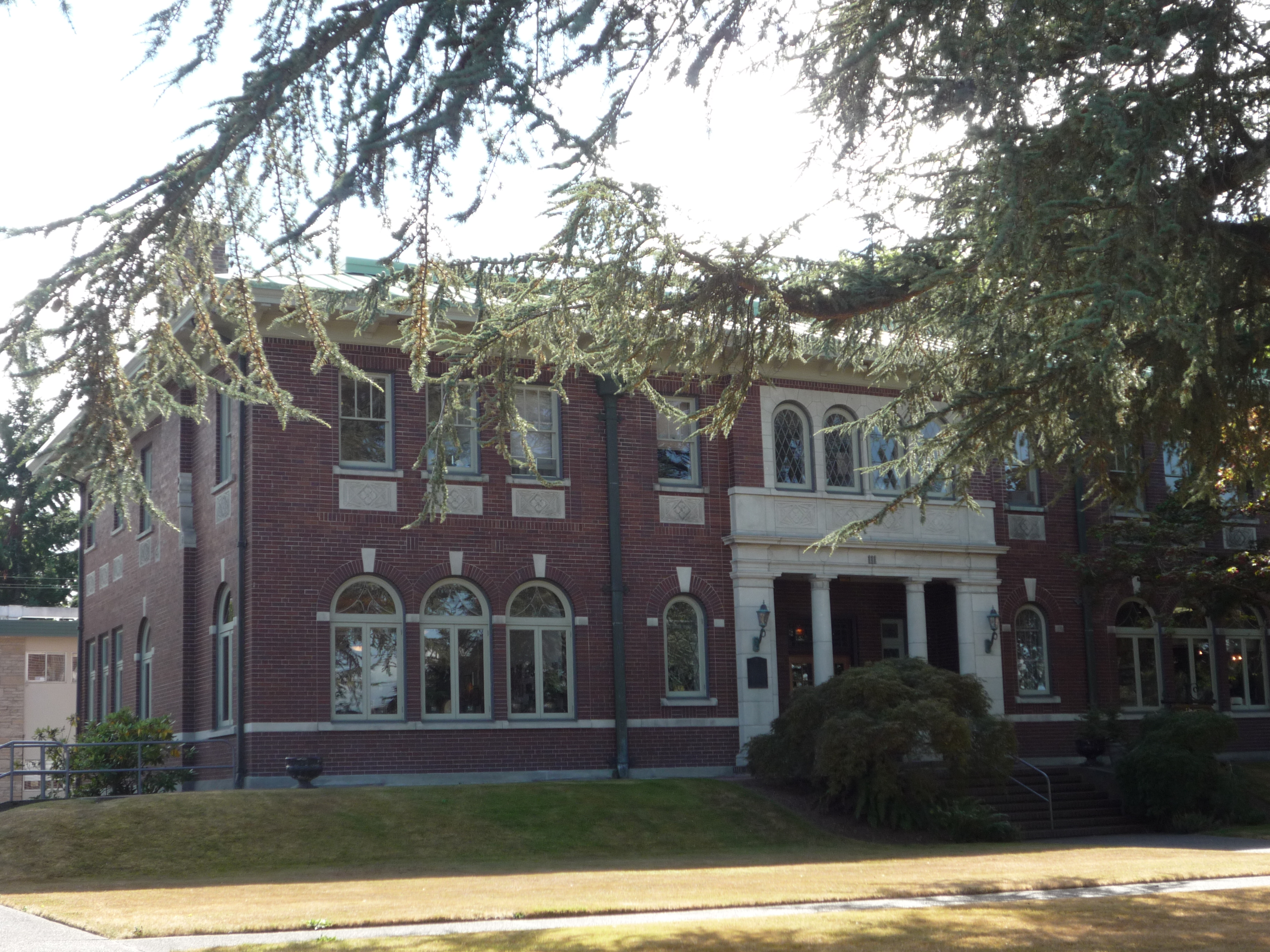
House for Henry McCleary, Olympia, Washington, 1923.

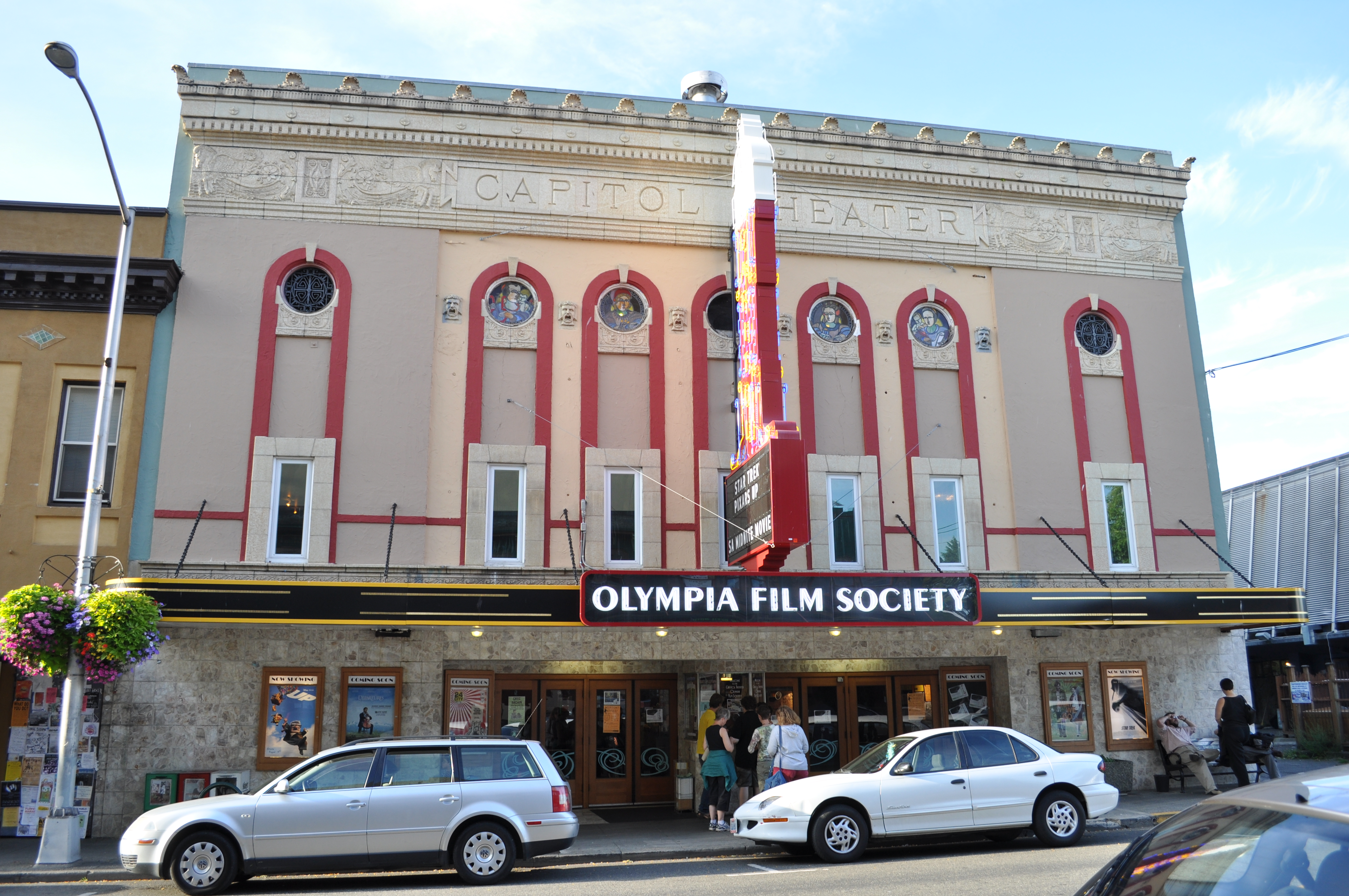
Capitol Theater, Olympia, Washington, 1924.

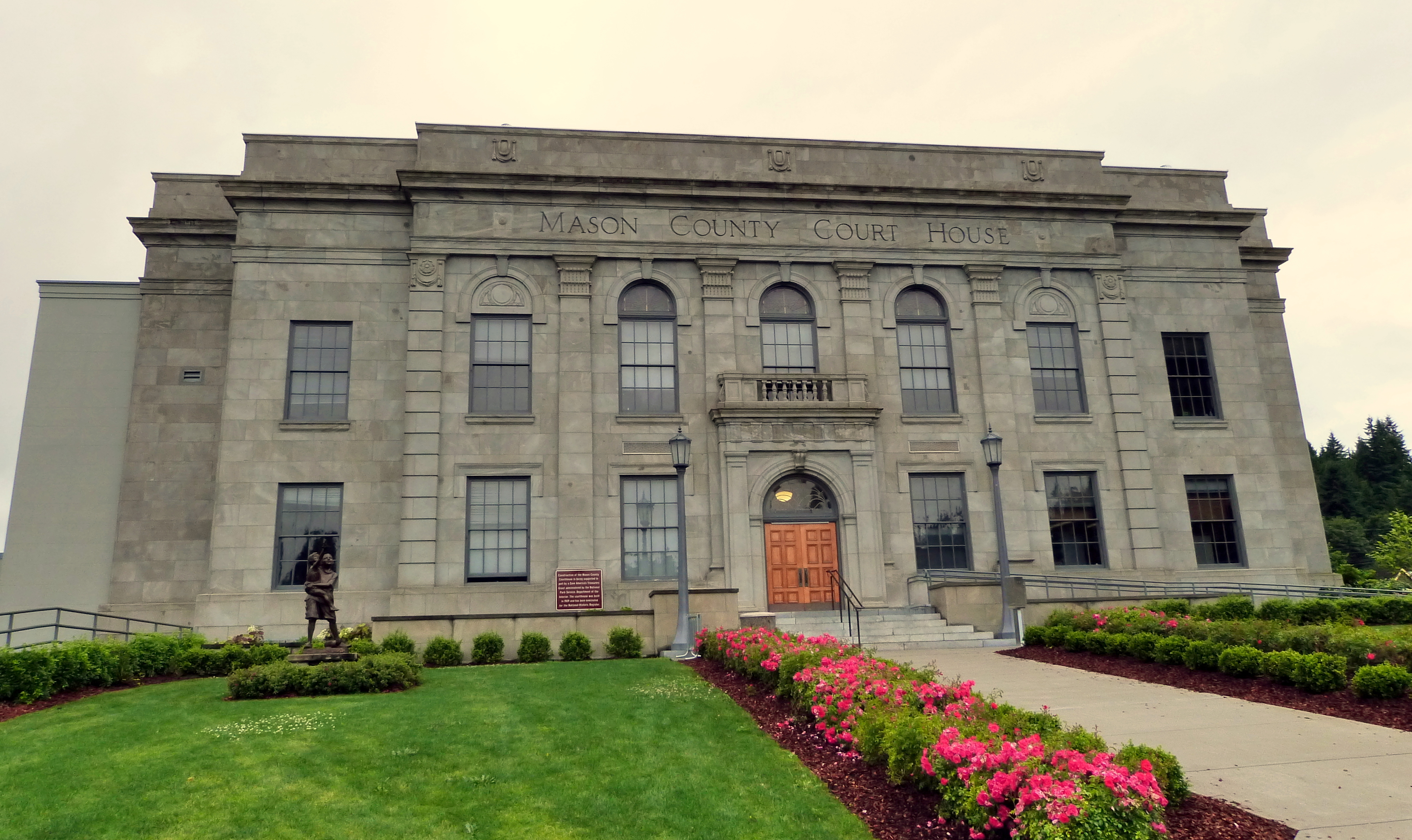
Mason County Courthouse, Shelton, Washington, 1929-30.

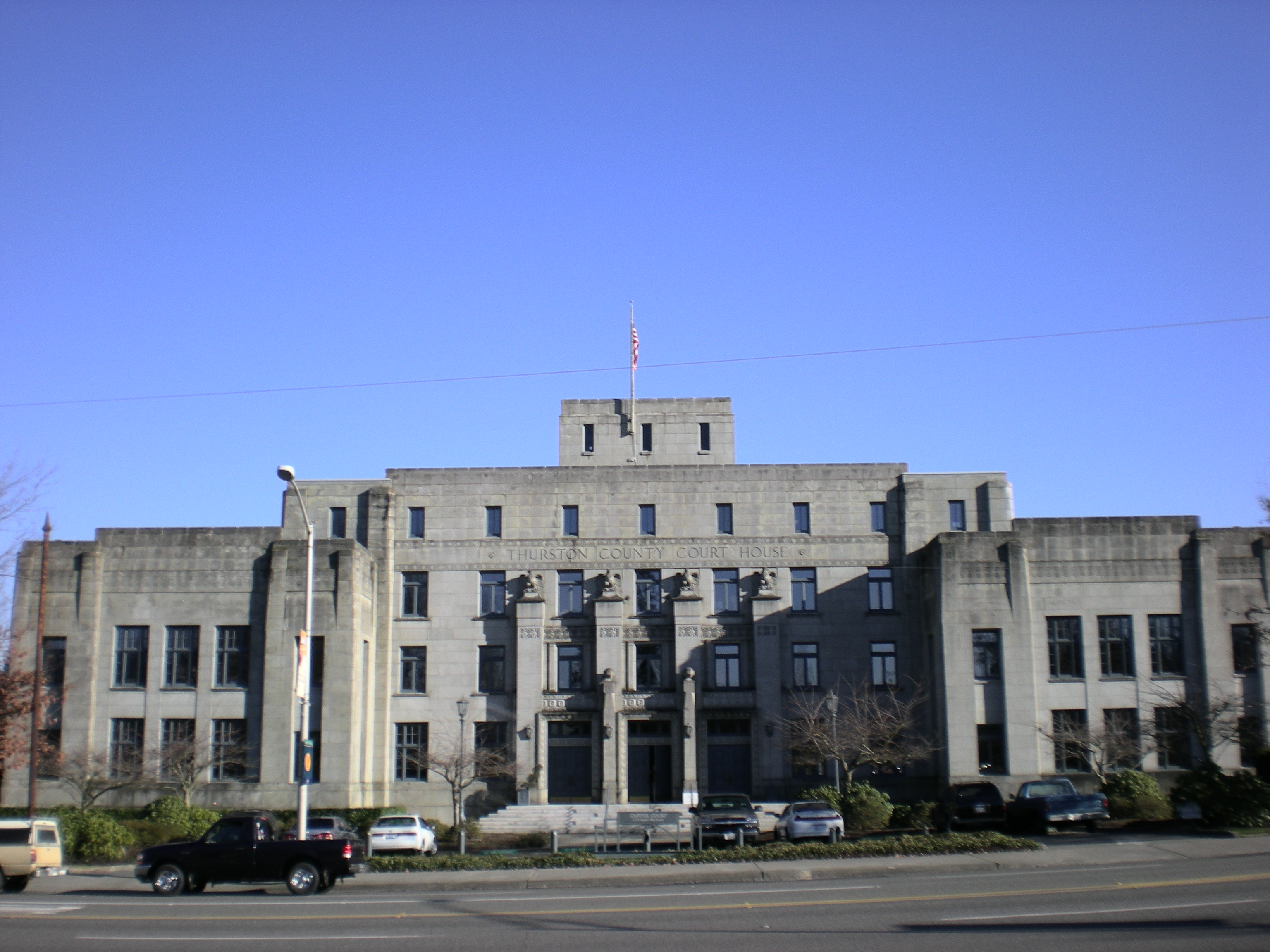
Thurston County Courthouse, Olympia, Washington, 1929-30.

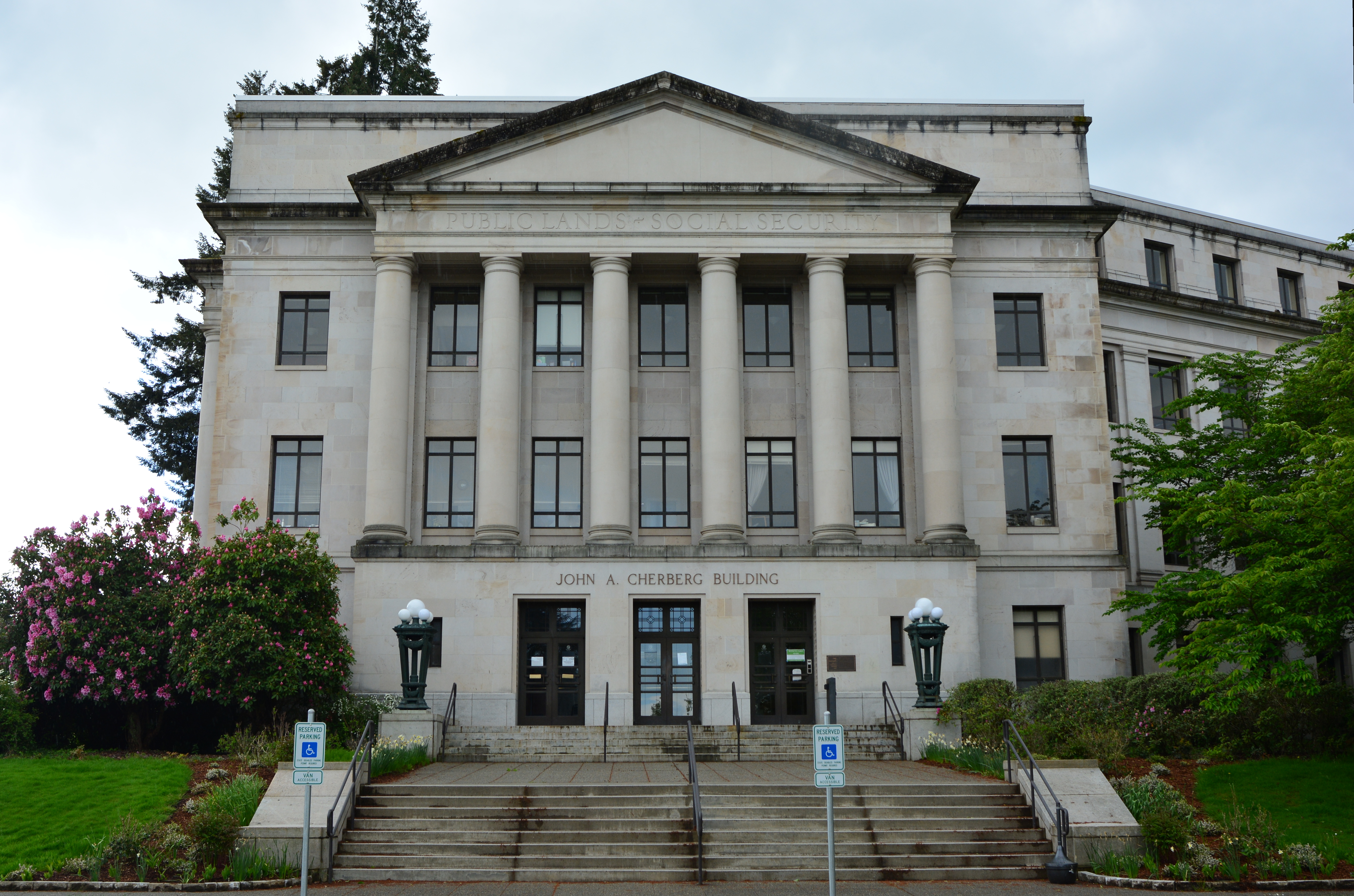
John A. Cherberg Building of the Washington State Capitol, Olympia, Washington, 1937.

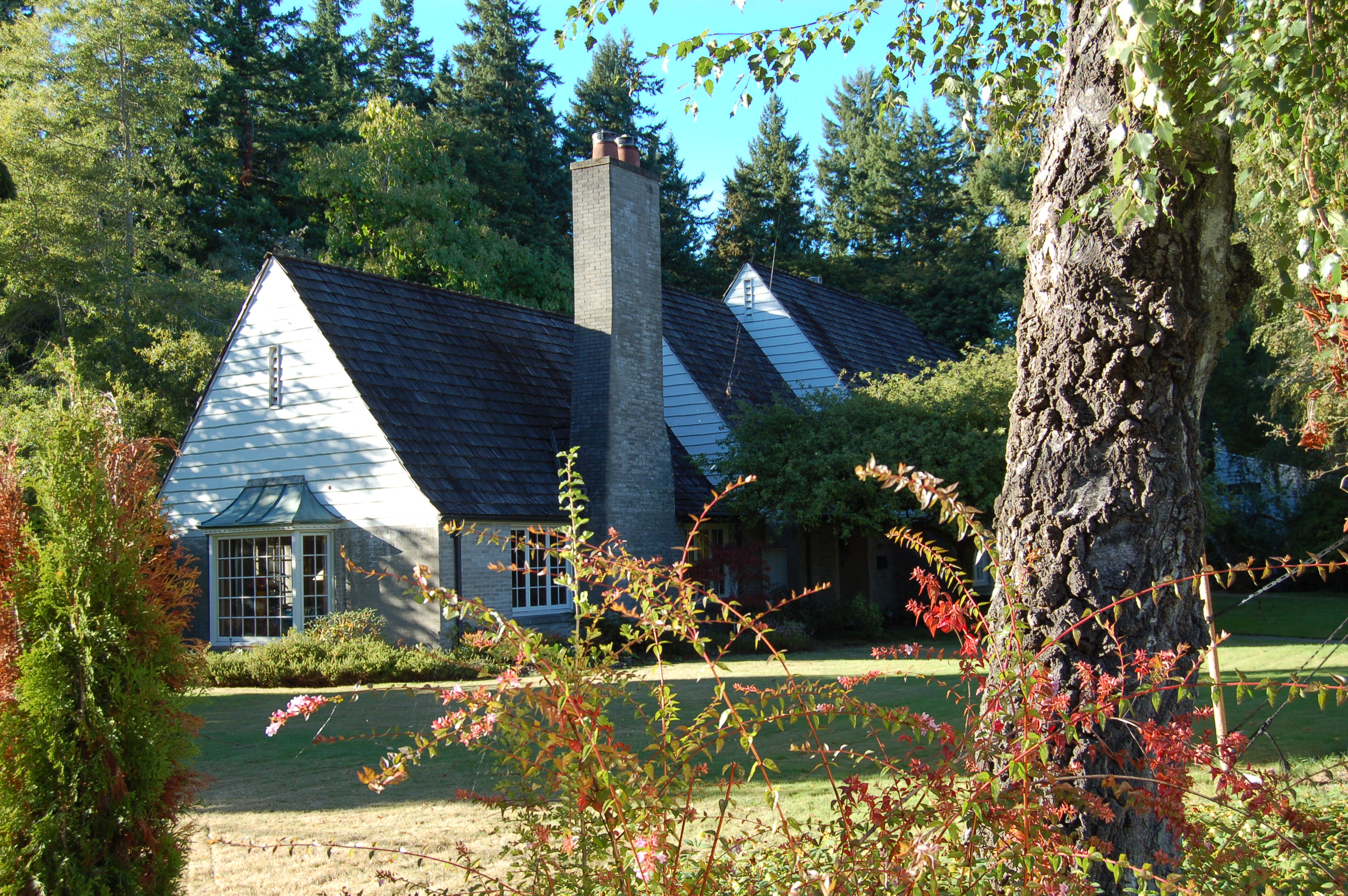
House for F. W. Schmidt, Olympia, Washington, 1938.

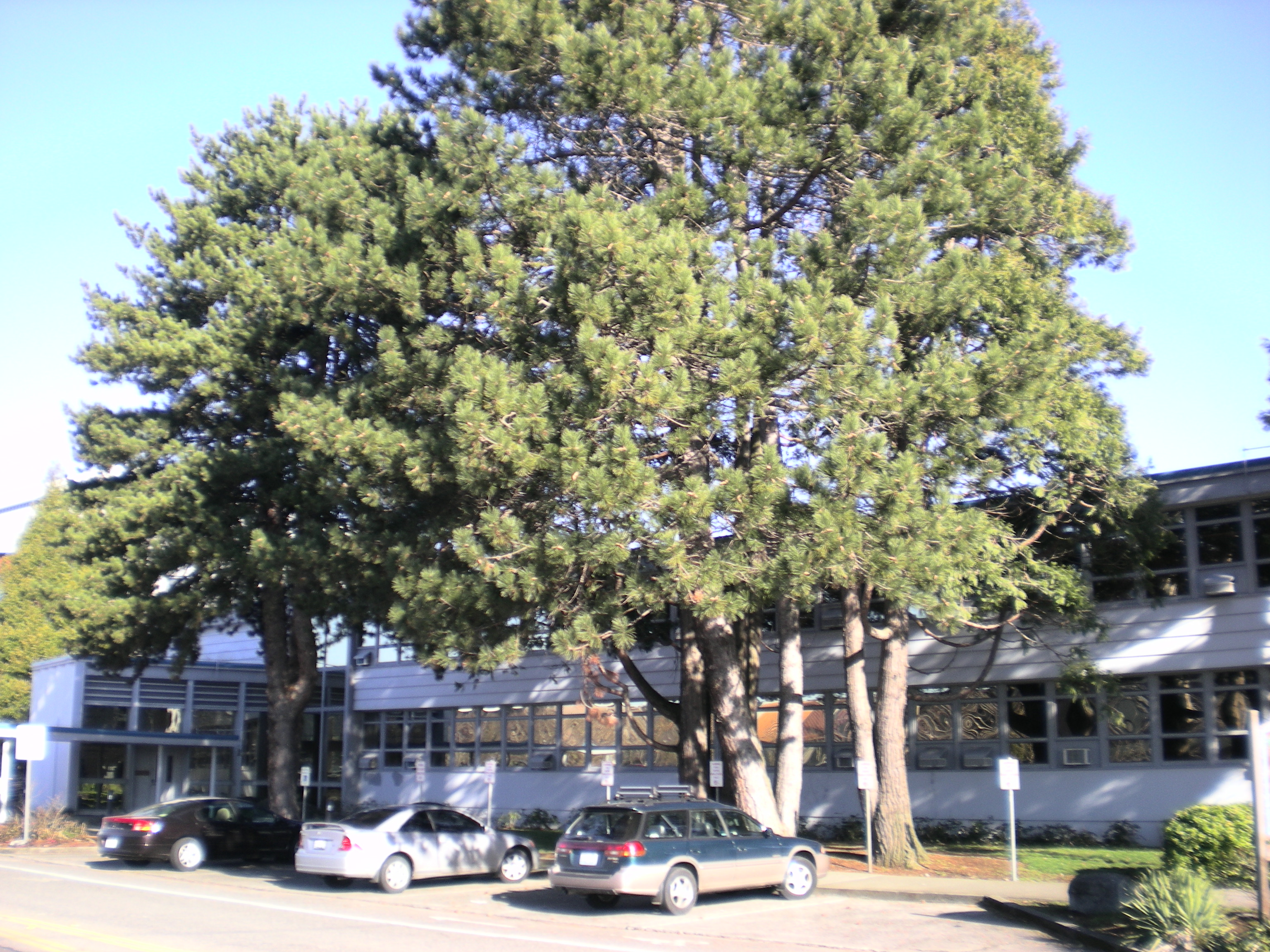
Georgia-Pacific Plywood Company Office, Olympia, Washington, 1952.
