= Capitol Theater (Olympia, Washington) =

Theater in Olympia, Washington, US

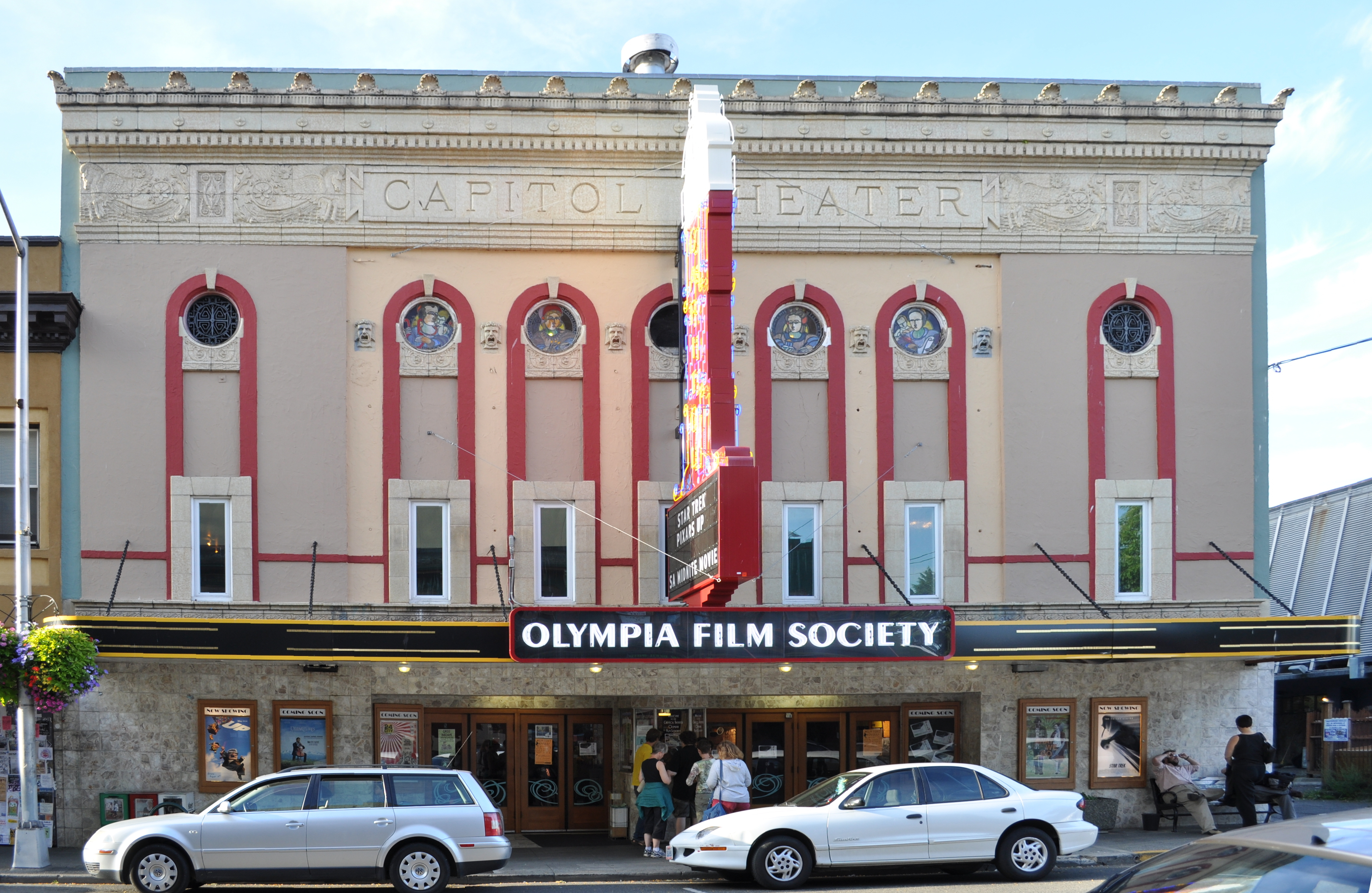
- Interactive map of Capitol Theater
- Address: 206 5th Avenue SE; Olympia, WA; USA
- Location: Olympia, Washington
- Coordinates: 47°02′40″N 122°54′00″W

Construction
- Opened: 1924
- Architect: Joseph Wohleb
- Builder: E.A. Zabel; William Wilson

Website
- Official website

The Capitol Theater is located in downtown Olympia, Washington and was built in 1924. The theater was designed by architect Joseph Wohleb and has a capacity of 1,500. Since 1986, the Olympia Film Society has operated the theater, which shows independent, international, and classic films and hosts concerts, comedy performances, plays, art walks, and workshops.

== History ==
The Capitol Theater was designed in the Revival/Beaux Arts style by Olympia architect Joseph Wohleb, who was tasked with creating a single-screen "picture palace" for "amusement lovers" with enough space for orchestras to accompany silent films. The building was constructed under the partnership of William Wilson and local theater director Edward (E.A.) Zabel. Zabel also installed some innovative features, including special seating for children, an extra-wide seat, and assisted-hearing devices.

The Capitol Theater began operations in 1924 with 762 seats and an audience of 1,000 on its opening night. The Zabel family, who also owned other local theatres, operated the Capitol Theater for 50 years.

In April 1937, a fire destroyed much of the building. Repairs were made, and the theater reopened in August of that year. The Capitol Theater saw another remodel and reopening in 1948.

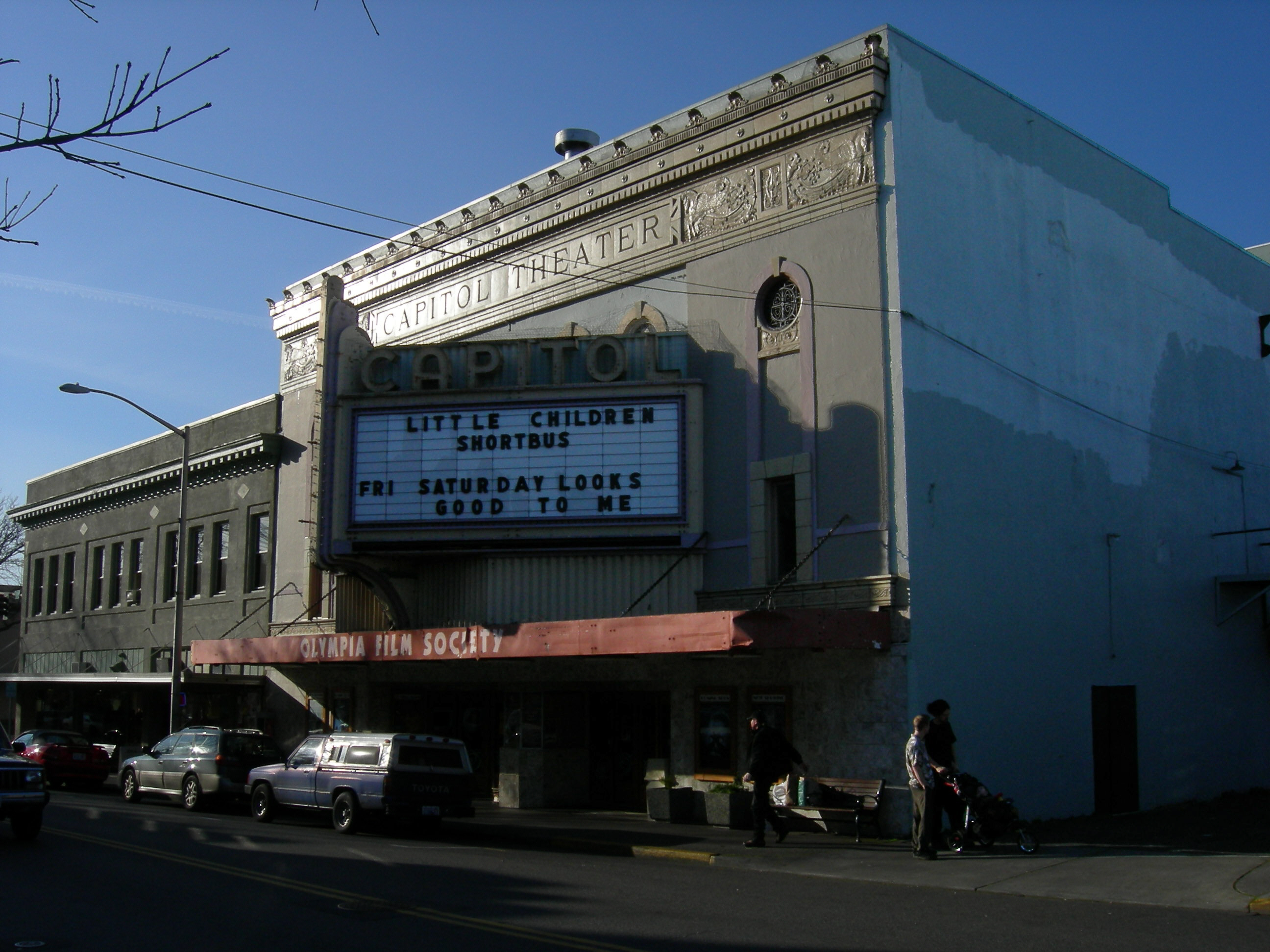
Capitol Theater exterior in 2007, before the marquee was removed.

The theater suffered major plaster damage to the ceiling during the 2001 Nisqually earthquake, but it has since undergone repair and re-opened. The marquee, a 1940 addition, was removed in January 2008 and replaced with a replica of one of the theater’s original marquees from the 1930s. The addition revealed stained glass muses that were concealed for more than 70 years.

In 2010, the OFS officially bought the Capitol Theater. In 2017, the OFS was awarded a grant from the Washington Heritage Capital Projects Fund to restore the Capitol Theater's exterior. Upgrades included a new roof, period-correct handcrafted windows, and a balcony fire escape. Also, the Ben B. Cheney Foundation helped the OFS with restoring the awning.

In January 2025, 100 years of the Capitol Theater was celebrated, with the OFS receiving the Stewardship Award from the Olympia Historical Society and the Bigelow House Museum.

== Performances and productions ==
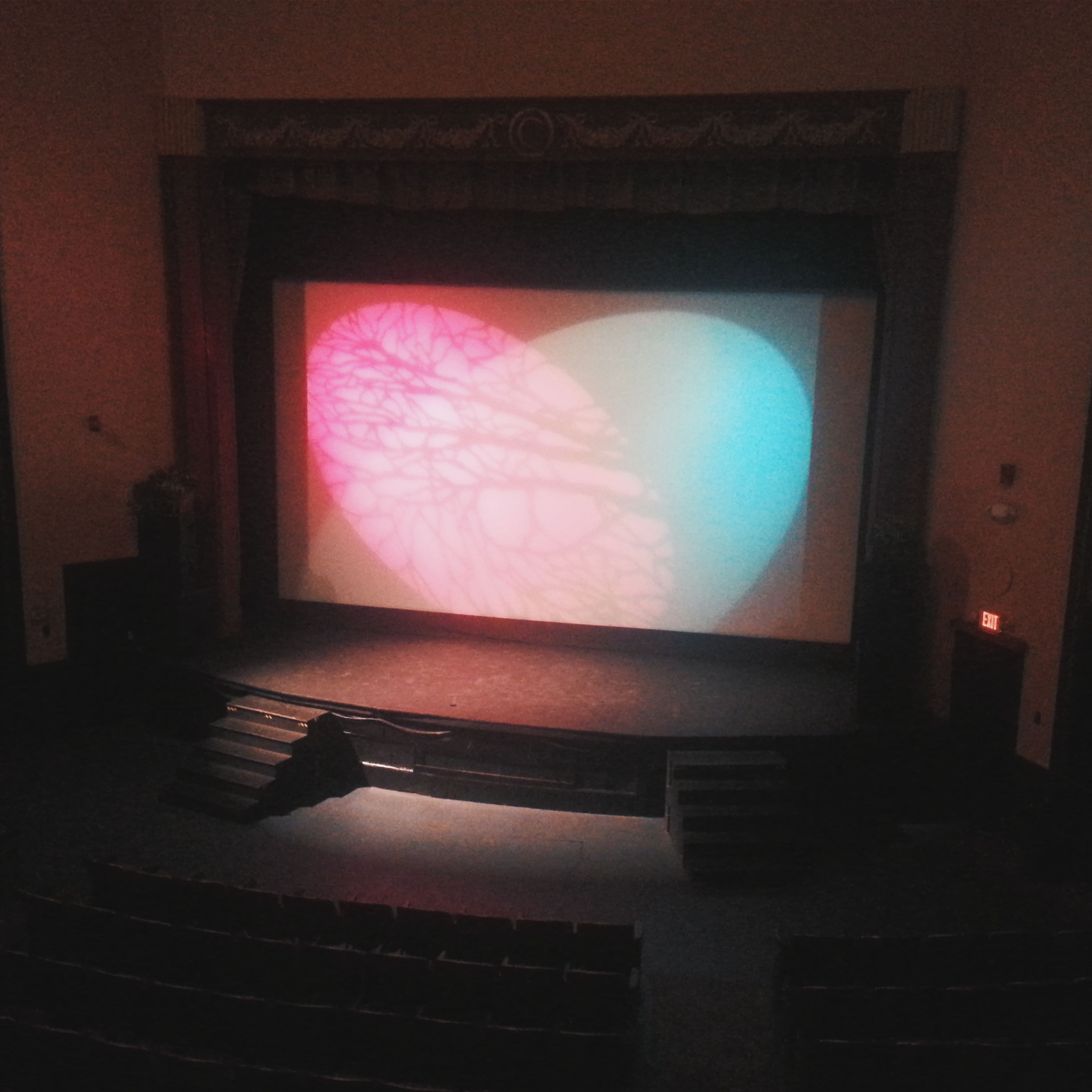
Capitol Theater stage and screen, 2014

In 1990, the Olympia Film Society (OFS) began leasing and showing films at the Capitol Theater. During the decade, the theater played host to the International Pop Underground Convention, a punk and indie rock music festival in 1991, as well as the similarly themed Yoyo A Go Go in 1994, 1997, 1999, and 2001.

Performances or productions at the Capitol Theater in the 21st century include a one-weekend only showing of the musical Legally Blonde in 2018 under a new local theater company, Broadway Olympia Productions.

Comedian Sam Miller's 2023 video and album Round Trip was recorded at the Capitol Theater. Also in 2023, American punk rock band Bikini Kill announced a benefit show for the Palestine Children’s Relief Fund at the Capitol Theater on January 27.

In December 2025, showings of the Olympia Family Theater's "The Snow Queen," a co-production with String and Shadow Puppet Theater, completely sold out online. However, the theater set aside 10 "pay-what-you-choose tickets" for each performance on December 27 and 28, which were made available one hour before showtime.
