= List of Elks buildings =

This is a list of notable buildings of the Benevolent and Protective Order of Elks, the American fraternal organization also known as the Elks or B.P.O.E., the Improved Benevolent and Protective Order of Elks of the World, the Black fraternal organization, and of Elks of Canada, its counterpart. There are many meeting hall buildings of the Elks that are prominent in small towns and in cities in the United States; a number of these are listed on the U.S. National Register of Historic Places (NRHP program). There are many hundreds of buildings that have limited association with Elks; this list is intended to cover only the most prominent ones, including all listed on any historic registry.

There is wide variety in the architecture of these buildings. Classical Revival architecture, Renaissance Revival and other revival styles are well represented among the NRHP-listed ones. More mundane, vernacular architecture, or in buildings less than 50 years old, is less likely to be preserved and recognized in the NRHP program.

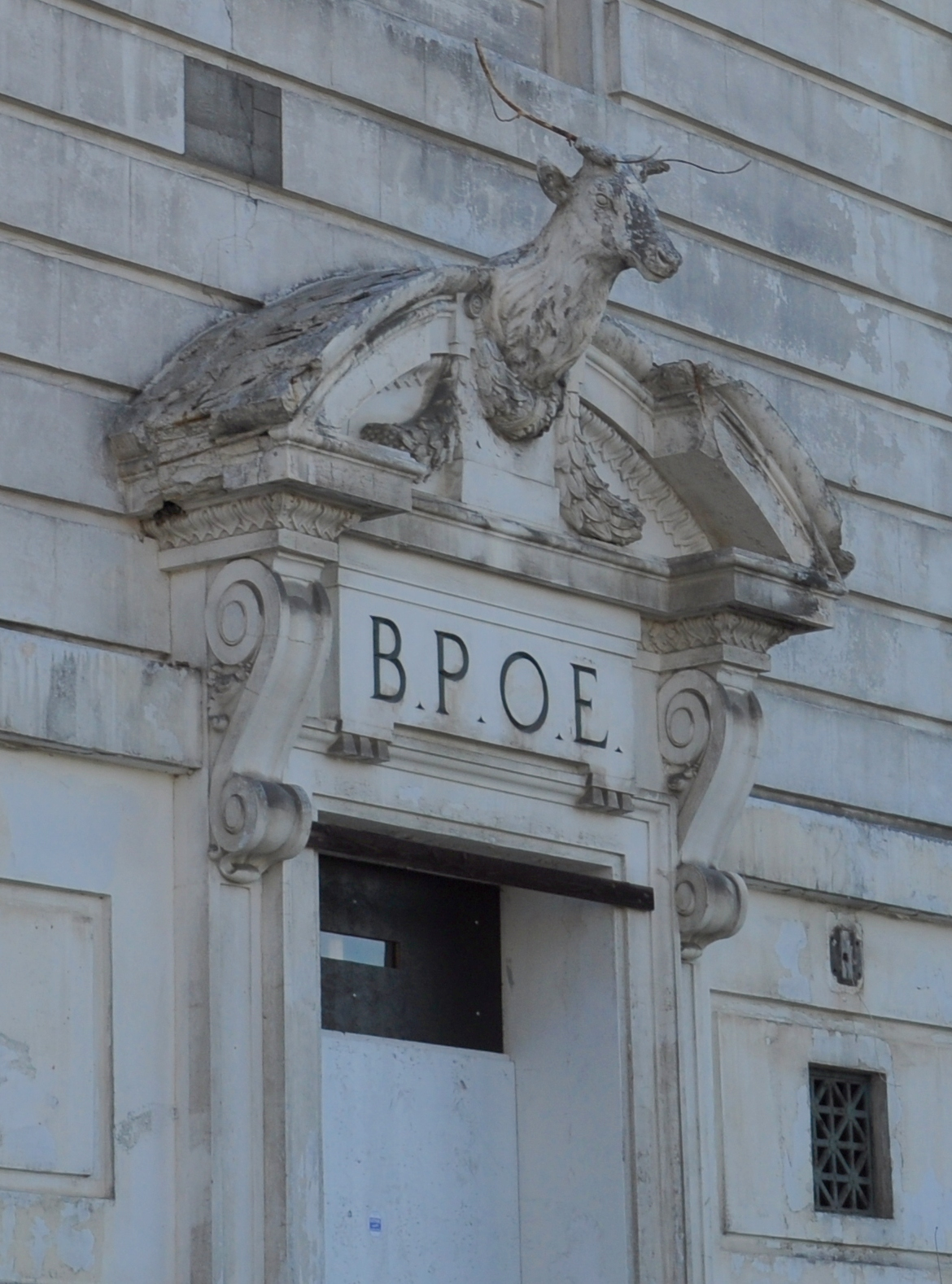
Elk head in pedimental sculpture at Elks Temple (Tacoma, Washington)

A number of historic Elks buildings include pedimental sculpture, such as the 1916 Elks Temple of Tacoma, Washington.

== United States ==
KEY

	NRHP-listed
^{∞}	Contributing in a NRHP-listed Historic district
	Formerly NRHP-listed

	Building	Image	Dates	Location	City, State	Description
1	Elks Building (Globe, Arizona)		1910 built 1987 NRHP-listed	155 W. Mesquite; 33°23′47″N 110°46′36″W	Globe, Arizona	Romanesque style Asserted to be the tallest three-story building in the United States
2	Elks' Lodge No. 468		1903 built 1986 NRHP-listed	Fourth and Oak Sts. 35°11′27″N 114°3′8″W	Kingman, Arizona	A Richardsonian Romanesque building
3	Elks Building and Theater		1904 built 1978 NRHP-listed	117 E. Gurley; 34.541799°N 112.467771°W	Prescott, Arizona	Early Commercial architecture, very prominent in the city.
4	BPOE Elks Club (Little Rock, Arkansas)		1908 built 1982 NRHP-listed	4th and Scott Sts. 34°44′44″N 92°16′9″W	Little Rock, Arkansas	
5	Elks Club (Marianna, Arkansas)		1911 built 1979 NRHP-listed	67 W. Main St. 34°46′23″N 90°45′36″W	Marianna, Arkansas	
6	Elks Lodge (Mena, Arkansas)		1908 built 1998 NRHP-listed	500 Mena St. 34°35′9″N 94°14′16″W	Mena, Arkansas	
7	Glendale Elks Lodge			Colorado Street	Glendale, California	
7	Woodland Elks Lodge No. 1299			500 Bush Street	Woodland, California	
7	Elks Tower				Sacramento, California	
8	Elks Building (Stockton, California)		1906 built 1980 NRHP-listed	42 N. Sutter St. 37°57′48″N 121°17′5″W	Stockton, California	Chicago, Commercial style
8.5	Cañon City Elks Club		1911 built 1983 NRHP CP	404 Macon Ave. 38.44065°N 105.24226°W	Cañon City, Colorado	Building of BPOE No. 610, founded 1900, in Cañon City Downtown Historic District.
9	Elks Lodge No. 607			1600 Colorado Blvd.	Idaho Springs, Colorado	
10	Benevolent and Protective Order of Elks Lodge (Montrose, Colorado)		1927 built 2004 NRHP-listed	107 S. Cascade Ave. 38°28′43″N 107°52′29″W	Montrose, Colorado	
11	Elks Lodge (Ouray, Colorado)	Elks Lodge	1904 built. Part of the Ouray Historic District, listed by the NRHP in 1983.		Ouray, Colorado	
12	B.P.O. Elks Lodge (Hartford, Connecticut)	Hartford CT Elks Lodge	1903 built 1984 NRHP-listed	34 Prospect St. 41°45′52″N 72°42′38″W	Hartford, Connecticut	
13	Elks Lodge (Norwich, Connecticut)	John Fox Slater House		41°45′52″N 72°42′38″W	Norwich, Connecticut	Also known as John Fox Slater House.
14	Willimantic Elks Club		1925 built 2005 NRHP-listed	198 Pleasant St. 41°42′43″N 72°20′1″W	Windham, Connecticut	Tudor Revival
15	Elks Club Building (Jacksonville, Florida)	Elks Club Building	2000 NRHP-listed	201-213 North Laura Street; 30°19′41″N 81°39′32″W	Jacksonville, Florida	HABS pic and info available
16	Elks Temple (Boise, Idaho)		1914 built 1978 NRHP-listed	310 Jefferson St. 43°37′6″N 116°12′5″W	Boise, Idaho	
17	Aurora Elks Lodge No. 705	Aurora Elks Lodge No. 705	1926 built 1980 NRHP-listed	77 S. Stolp Ave. 41°45′23″N 88°19′2″W	Aurora, Illinois	
18	Elks Veterans Memorial		1926 built 2003 Chicago landmark	2750 N. Lakeview	Chicago, Illinois	Looks out over Lincoln Park. HABS pic avail.
19	Litchfield Elks Lodge No. 654	Litchfield Elks Lodge No. 654	1923 built 1995 NRHP-listed	424 N. Monroe St. 39°10′40″N 89°39′14″W	Litchfield, Illinois	
20	Murphysboro Elks Lodge	Murphysboro Elks Lodge	1916 built 2005 NRHP-listed	1329 Walnut St. 37°45′58″N 89°20′15″W	Murphysboro, Illinois	Classical Revival
21	Paris Elks Lodge No. 812 Building		1987 NRHP-listed	39°36′47″N 87°41′38″W	Paris, Illinois	
22	Elks-Rogers Hotel		1901 built 1982 NRHP-listed	223 Main Ave. 43°8′8″N 93°22′54″W	Clear Lake, Iowa	Late Victorian architecture
23	Elks Athletic Club		1924 built 1979 NRHP-listed	604 S. 3rd St. 38°14′55″N 85°45′23″W	Louisville, Kentucky	Classical Revival architecture
24	Elks Building (Quincy, Massachusetts)		1924 built 1989 NRHP-listed	1218—1222 Hancock St. 42°15′9.5″N 71°0′15″W	Quincy, Massachusetts	Colonial Revival
25	Elks Temple Building (Cadillac, Michigan)	Elks Temple Building (Cadillac, Michigan)	1910 built 1988 NRHP-listed	122 S. Mitchell St. 44°14′58″N 85°23′57″W	Cadillac, Michigan	Classical Revival architecture
26	Elks Lodge Building (Flint, Michigan)	Elks Lodge Building (Flint, Michigan)	1913 built 1978 NRHP-listed	142 W. 2nd St. 43°0′50″N 83°41′28″W	Flint, Michigan	Late 19th and 20th Century Revivals, Second Renaissance Revival
27	Old Elks Club (Greenville, Mississippi)			Washington Avenue	Greenwood, Mississippi	Building of the Greenville Lodge No. 148, BPOE. Designated a Mississippi Landmark in 2002
28	Elks Club (Greenwood, Mississippi)			102 Washington Street, West	Greenwood, Mississippi	Designated a Mississippi Landmark in 2002
29	Elks Lodge (Greenwood, Mississippi)			Avenue F near W. Scott St.	Greenwood, Mississippi	Location of "black Elks" lodge. Listed on the Mississippi Blues Trail.
30	Elks Building (Jackson, Mississippi)			119 President Street, South	Jackson, Mississippi	Designated a Mississippi Landmark in 1992
31	Elks Club Lodge No. 501	Elks Club Lodge No. 501	1904 built 1985 NRHP-listed	318—320 W. 4th St. 37°5′15″N 94°30′58″W	Joplin, Missouri	Colonial Revival and Georgian Revival. Destroyed by tornado in May 2011
32	B.P.O.E. No. 690		built NRHP-listed	122 N. Main St. 38°46′50″N 90°28′54″W	St. Charles, Missouri	Contributing building in St. Charles Historic District
33	Elks Building (Anaconda, Montana)	Elks Building	1914 built 1966 NRHP-cp	40°51′46″N 74°7′40″W	Anaconda, Montana	Contributing property in NRHP-listed Butte-Anaconda Historic District
34	Billings Chamber of Commerce Building		1911 built 1972 NRHP	303 N. 27th St. 45°47′05″N 108°30′19″W	Billings, Montana	Italian Renaissance Revival in style. Built in 1911 for Elks club which lost ownership in 1918.
35	New Brunswick Elks Lodge 324	New Brunswick Elks Club	1925 built	20 Livingston Avenue; 40°29′32″N 74°26′41.5″W	New Brunswick, New Jersey	
35.5	Passaic Elks Club	Passaic Elks Club	1924 built 2005 NRHP-listed	29-31 Howe Avenue; 40°51′46″N 74°7′40″W	Passaic, New Jersey	Late 19th and 20th Century Revivals, Renaissance, Italian Renaissance
36	Elks Club and Store Building-Dickenson Lodge No. 1137		1913 built 2008 NRHP-listed	103 1st Ave. W., Dickinson, North Dakota; 46.88006°N 102.78728°W	Dickinson, North Dakota	Early Commercial
37	BPOE Lodge: Golden Block		c.1910 built 1991(?) NRHP-listed; 2004 NRHP delisted	12 N. 4th St.	Grand Forks, North Dakota	Early Commercial
38	Elks Lodge No. 841		1904 built	3250 Richmond Ave	Staten Island, New York	old English architecture
39	Elks Lodge No. 878		1924 built 2014 NRHP-listed	82-10 Queens Boulevard	Queens, New York	Italian Renaissance Revival architecture
40	Elks Club (East Liverpool, Ohio)		1916 built 1985 NRHP-listed	139 W. Fifth St. 40°37′11″N 80°34′54″W	East Liverpool, Ohio	Colonial Revival, Colonial Revival
41	Elks Lodge (Lima, Ohio)		1909 built 1982 NRHP-listed	138 W. North St. 40°44′35″N 84°6′23″W	Lima, Ohio	Now used by a church. Has "B", "P", "O", "E" letters at capitals in the facade.
42	Elyria Elks Club		? built 1979 NRHP-listed	246 2nd St. 41°21′58″N 82°6′23″W	Elyria, Ohio	Renaissance
43	Elks Lodge Building (Oklahoma City, Oklahoma)		1926 built 1980 NRHP-listed	401 N. Harvey St. 35°28′16″N 97°31′10″W	Oklahoma City, Oklahoma	Renaissance/Italian Renaissance architecture
44	Elks Victory Lodge-Ruby's Grill Building	Elks Victory Lodge-Ruby's Grill Building	1929 built 1996 NRHP-listed	322 NE 2nd 35°28′10″N 97°30′22″W	Oklahoma City, Oklahoma	
45	Astoria Elks Building	Astoria Elks Building	1923 built 1990 NRHP-listed	453 Eleventh St. 46°11′17″N 123°49′51″W	Astoria, Oregon	Beaux Arts
46	Marshfield Elks Temple	Marshfield (Coos Bay) Elks Temple	1919 built 1983 NRHP-listed	195 S. 2nd St. 43°22′3″N 124°12′45″W	Coos Bay, Oregon	Georgian
47	BPOE Lodge No. 1168		1915 built 1980 NRHP-listed	202 N. Central Ave. 42°19′43″N 122°52′25″W	Medford, Oregon	Designed by architect Frank Chamberlain Clark in Beaux Arts style.
48	Elks Temple (Portland, Oregon)		1922 built 1978 NRHP-listed	614 SW 11th Ave. 45°31′15″N 122°40′53″W	Portland, Oregon	Late 19th and 20th Century Revivals architecture, Second Renaissance Revival architecture
49	Philadelphia Lodge No. 2 BPOE (1925)			1320 Arch Street; 39°57′15″N 75°9′43″W	Philadelphia, Pennsylvania	This is the old building in Chinatown which was used both before and after the larger, NRHP-listed, BPOE No. 2 at 320 Broad St., which is now demolished.
50	Pawtucket Elks Lodge Building		1926 built 1983 NRHP-listed	41°52′46″N 71°23′10″W	Pawtucket, Rhode Island	Mission/Spanish Revival
51	Fort Worth Elks Lodge 124	Fort Worth Elks Lodge 124	1927 built 1984 NRHP-listed	512 W. 4th St. 32°45′10″N 97°20′5″W	Fort Worth, Texas	Colonial Revival, Georgian Revival
52	Elks Club Building (Tyler, Texas)	Elks Club Building (Tyler, Texas)	1949 built 2002 NRHP-listed	202 S. Broadway; 32°20′56″N 95°18′0″W	Tyler, Texas	International Style architecture
53	Elks National Home	Elks National Home	1916 built 2008 NRHP-listed	931 Ashland Ave.	Bedford, Virginia	Colonial Revival architecture, Mediterranean Revival architecture
54	B. P. O. E. Building (Bellingham, Washington)		1912 built 1992 NRHP-listed	1412-1414 Cornwall; 47°45′5″N 122°28′31″W	Bellingham, Washington	Beaux Arts/Neo-Classical. Now used as a restaurant.
55	Bremerton Elks Temple Lodge No. 1181 Building		1920 built 1995 NRHP-listed	285 Fifth St. 47°34′0″N 122°37′31″W	Bremerton, Washington	Moderne architecture, Classical Revival architecture
56	Elks Building (Olympia, Washington)		1919 built 1988 NRHP-listed	607—613 S. Capitol Way; 47°2′34″N 122°54′2″W	Olympia, Washington	Vernacular Commercial architecture
57	Naval Lodge Elks Building		1927 built 1986 NRHP-listed	131 E. First St. 48°7′06.80″N 123°25′55.20″W	Port Angeles, Washington	Late 19th and 20th Century Revivals, Renaissance Revival
58	Elks Temple (Tacoma, Washington)		1916 built		Tacoma, Washington	Architect E. Frere Champney-designed Beaux Arts building.
59	Elks Building (Vancouver, Washington)	Elks Building (Vancouver, Washington)	1911 built 1983 NRHP-listed	916 Main St. 45°37′43″N 122°40′19″W	Vancouver, Washington	Late 19th and 20th Century Revivals
60	Elks Club (Parkersburg, West Virginia)		1903 built 1982 NRHP-listed	515 Juliana St. 39°16′2″N 81°33′39″W	Parkersburg, West Virginia	Classical Revival
61	Ashland Elks Club		1970's built	3000 Golf Course Road	Ashland, Wisconsin	Modern
62	Kenosha Elks Club	Former Kenosha Elks Club building	1917 built Dedicated January 1919	5706 Eighth Ave	Kenosha, Wisconsin	Georgian Revival
63	Racine Elks Club, Lodge No. 252	Racine Elks Club, Lodge No. 252	1912 built 1984 NRHP-listed	601 Lake Ave. 42°43′37″N 87°46′52″W	Racine, Wisconsin	Classical Revival
64	Elks Lodge No. 1353	Elks Lodge No. 1353	1922 built 1997 NRHP-listed	108 E. 7th St.	Casper, Wyoming	Renaissance architecture
65	Rock Springs Elks' Lodge No. 624	Elks Lodge No. 624	1924 built 1993 NRHP-listed	307 C St. 41°35′3″N 109°13′7″W	Rock Springs, Wyoming	Italian Renaissance Revival architecture

== International ==
- Canada
  - Elks National Office, Regina, Saskatchewan, headquarters of Elks of Canada
- Philippines
  - Elks Club Building, Manilla, now the Museo Pambata
