= Elks Building =

Elks Building may refer to:

- Elks Building (Globe, Arizona)
- Elks Building (Stockton, California)
- Elks Building (Quincy, Massachusetts)
- Elks Building (Anaconda, Montana)
- Elks Building (Olympia, Washington)
- Elks Building (Vancouver, Washington)

== See also ==
- Elks Club Building (disambiguation)
- Elks Lodge Building (disambiguation)
- Elks (disambiguation)
