= Elks Temple =

Elks Temple or Elks Temple Building may refer to:

- Elks Temple (Boise, Idaho)
- Elks Temple Building, Cadillac, Michigan
- Elks Temple (Portland, Oregon)
- Elks Temple (Tacoma, Washington)
- Elks Temple (Valparaiso, Indiana)

== See also ==
- List of Elks buildings
- Elks (disambiguation)
