= Elks Lodge Building =

Elks Lodge Building may refer to:

- Elks Lodge Building (Flint, Michigan)
- Elks Lodge Building (Oklahoma City)

== See also ==
- List of Elks buildings
