= Elks Club Building =

Elks Club Building may refer to:

- Elks Club Building (Jacksonville, Florida), a building on the National Register of Historic Places
- Elks Club Building (Tyler, Texas), a building on the National Register of Historic Places
- Elks Club Building (Manila), the Philippines
