= Estefania Aldaba-Lim =

Filipina diplomat and psychologist (1917–2006)

Estefanía Aldaba Lim

Secretary of Social Services and Development Secretary of Social Welfare (1971–1976)
- In office April 11, 1971 – November 30, 1977
- President: Ferdinand Marcos
- Preceded by: Gregorio Feliciano
- Succeeded by: Nathaniel Tablante

Personal details
- Born: Estefanía Aldaba; January 6, 1917 Malolos, Bulacan, Philippine Islands, U.S.
- Died: March 7, 2006 (aged 89) Manila, Philippines
- Spouse: Luis Lim (m. 1944; died 1962)
- Children: 6, including Cheche Lazaro
- Education: Malolos Elementary School; Bulacan High School (now Marcelo H. del Pilar National High School)
- Alma mater: Philippine Women's University; University of Michigan
- Occupation: Psychologist, advocate, diplomat
- Awards: United Nations Peace Medal (1979)

Estefanía "Fanny" Aldaba Lim (born Estefanía Aldaba; January 6, 1917 – March 7, 2006) was the first female secretary of any Cabinet of the Philippines, serving as Secretary of Social Services and Development from 1971 to 1977. She was also the first Filipina clinical psychologist.

== Early life and education ==
Aldaba was born on January 6, 1917, the fifth of 14 children. She was born and raised in Malolos, in the province of Bulacan, Philippines, by her father, a provincial treasurer of Malolos, and her mother, a homemaker.

Aldaba graduated from Malolos Elementary School and finished her secondary education at Bulacan High School (now Marcelo H. del Pilar National High School) in 1933. She earned a Bachelor of Arts degree from Philippine Women's University in 1936, a Bachelor of Education degree from Philippine Women's University in 1938, and a Master of Arts in psychology from the University of the Philippines in 1939.

In 1942, Aldaba completed her PhD at the University of Michigan, becoming the first Filipina to earn a doctoral degree in clinical psychology.

== Career ==
Aldaba-Lim returned to Manila in 1948. She established the Institute of Human Relations at Philippine Women's University, and was a founding member and president of the Philippine Association of Psychologists and of the Philippine Mental Health Association.

In 1971, Aldaba-Lim became the first woman cabinet member in the Philippines when she was appointed as Secretary of the Department of Social Services and Development (DSSD). She held this role until 1977.

In 1976 through 1977, Aldaba-Lim served as president of the Girl Scouts of the Philippines.

In 1976, Aldaba-Lim was elected the Asian regional representative of the UNESCO Executive Board. In 1979, she became was the first woman to become Special Ambassador to the United Nations, with the rank of assistant secretary general during the UNICEF—UNESCO International Year of the Child. She received the United Nations Peace Medal that year from Secretary General Kurt Waldheim.

In 1994, she founded the Museo Pambata, the Philippines's first children's museum, in the repurposed 1949 Manila Elks Club building in Manila.

== Marriage and children ==
Aldaba-Lim had six children with her husband Luis Lim, whom she married in 1944. Lim died in an airplane crash in 1962. One of her children is the broadcast journalist Cheche Lazaro.

== Death ==
On March 7, 2006, at age 89, Aldaba-Lim died of leukemia at her home in Manila, Philippines.

== See also ==
- Museo Pambata, Manila
