= Blackstone Building (Tyler, Texas) =

- U.S. National Register of Historic Places
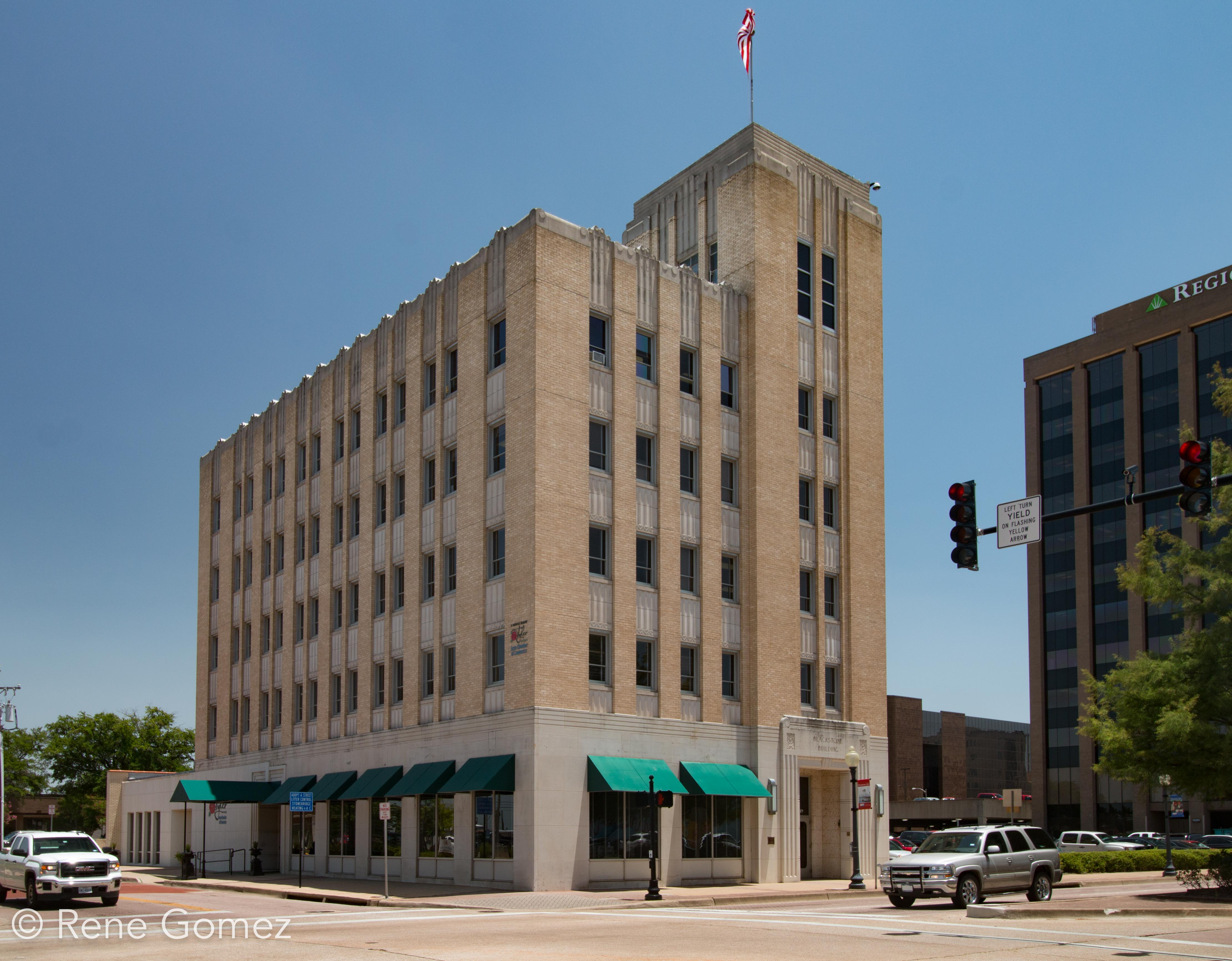
- Blackstone Building in 2018

- Location within Texas Location within the United States
- Location: 315 N. Broadway, Tyler, Texas
- Coordinates: 32°21′11″N 95°18′1″W
- Area: less than one acre
- Built: 1938
- Built by: Hugh E. White
- Architect: Preston Geren Sr.
- Architectural style: Art Deco
- MPS: Tyler, Texas MPS
- NRHP reference No.: 02000645
- Added to NRHP: June 14, 2002

The Blackstone Building in Tyler, Texas is an Art Deco building built in 1938. It was listed on the National Register of Historic Places in 2002. Fort Worth architect Preston M. Geren designed the six-story building, which is one of only two Art Deco-style office buildings in the Tyler area. The project was financed by Tyler businessman Edmond P. McKenna and intended to ease the need for office space during the East Texas oil boom. The building housed offices for oil companies, geologists, attorneys, engineers, and more. In addition, the Blackstone was a location for the Union Bus Terminal from 1938 to the 1950s. The Blackstone Hotel next door was imploded in 1985 but the Blackstone Building still stands. It is being used as office space and houses the Tyler Chamber of Commerce.

The building cost about $100,000. At one time it hosted about 15 oil industry-related businesses.

It was built by Tyler contractor Hugh E. White. White is also built one of few International Style buildings in Tyler, the Elks Club Building (1949), which is also NRHP-listed.

== See also ==
- National Register of Historic Places listings in Smith County, Texas
