= Elks Temple Building (Cadillac, Michigan) =

- U.S. National Register of Historic Places
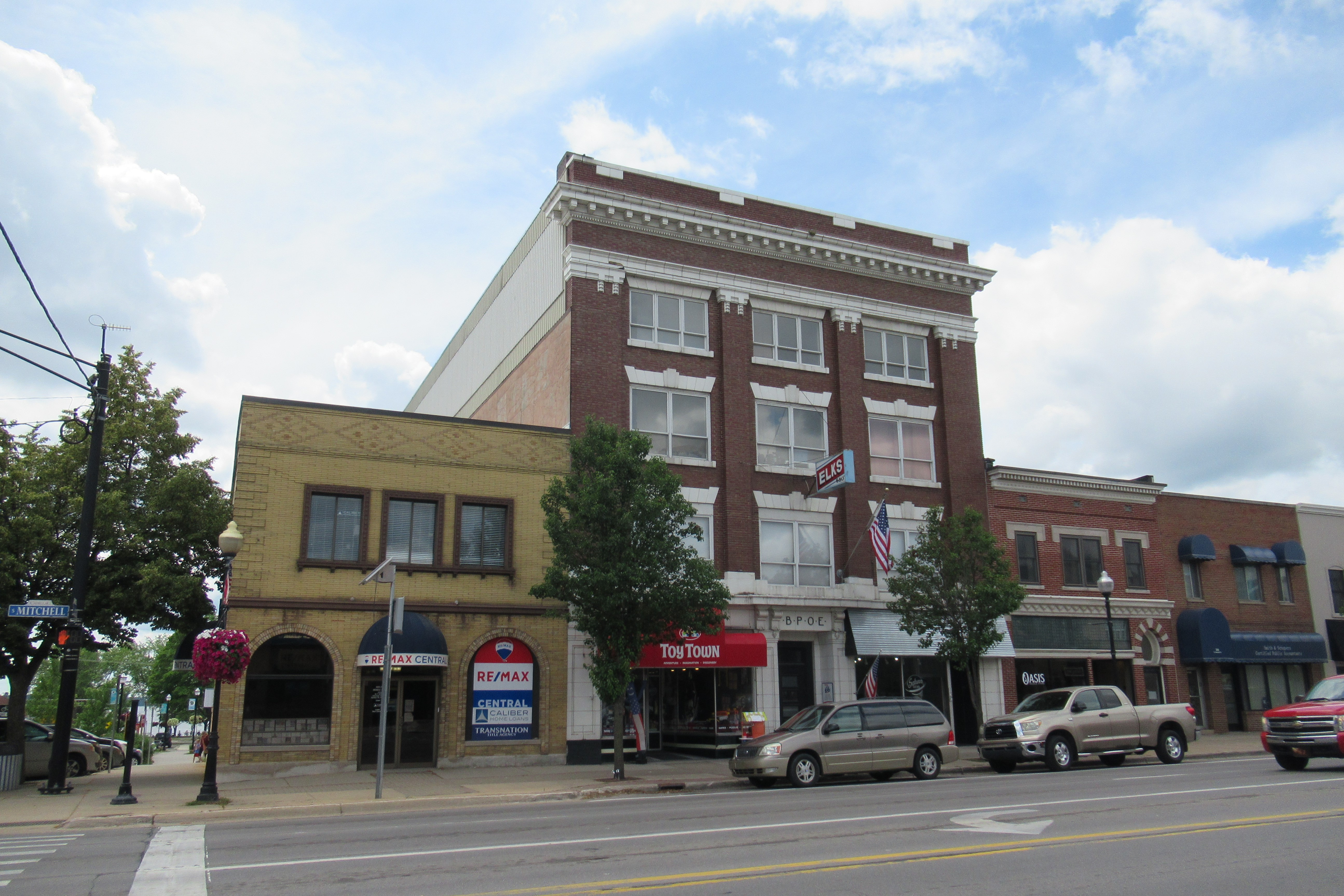

- Location within Michigan Location within the United States
- Interactive map
- Location: 122 S. Mitchell St., Cadillac, Michigan
- Coordinates: 44°14′58″N 85°23′57″W
- Area: less than one acre
- Built: 1910
- Architect: Osgood & Osgood
- Architectural style: Classical Revival
- NRHP reference No.: 88001835
- Added to NRHP: September 29, 1988

The Elks Temple Building in Cadillac, Michigan was built in 1910 as a lodge meeting hall. It was listed on the National Register of Historic Places in 1988.

== History ==
The Cadillac Elks Lodge was organized in 1901. The Cadillac Elks held their meetings in the Maccabee Hall, but soon began sharing another building with the Knights of Pythias. In 1910, the Elks began planning for their own building. They obtained a site, and contracted with the Grand Rapids architectural firm of Osgood & Osgood, which specialized in designing similar buildings for fraternal organizations. Osgood & Osgood both designed and constructed the building. Construction was started in 1910, and completed in 1911 at a cost of $53,000.

Although multiple stores have been housed on the ground floor, the Elks Temple Building remains the meeting place of the local lodge.

== Description ==
The Cadillac Elks Temple is a four-story Classical Revival red brick building with a flat roof and cream terra cotta trim. The front facade has central stairhall entrance flanked by storefronts on the ground level. The upper three stories are divided into three bays each by piers. A classical cornice and parapet runs across the top. Windows in each bay of the upper stories were originally all paired, double-hung, six-over-one type, but have been replaced with paired or tripled double-hung one-over-one type windows.

On the interior, the temple has two retail spaces on the street level. The center entrance leads to a staircase to the upper part of the building, which has hardwood floors with wooden doors and window trim. The second floor contains a large dining room with a bar and a card and billiard room. The dining room/bar area was likely refurbished in the 1950s. The third floor contains the lodge rooms, the lodge office, and storage spaces. The fourth floor contains a single large room. The lodge room is a rectangular area, with walls subdivided by stained wood pilasters. Benches are lined along the walls to face a central altar. At one end is a triple chair, set beneath the head of an elk. The room's furnishings likely date from the time of the building's construction.

== See also ==
- List of Elks buildings
- National Register of Historic Places listings in Wexford County, Michigan
