= Marshfield Elks Temple =

- U.S. National Register of Historic Places
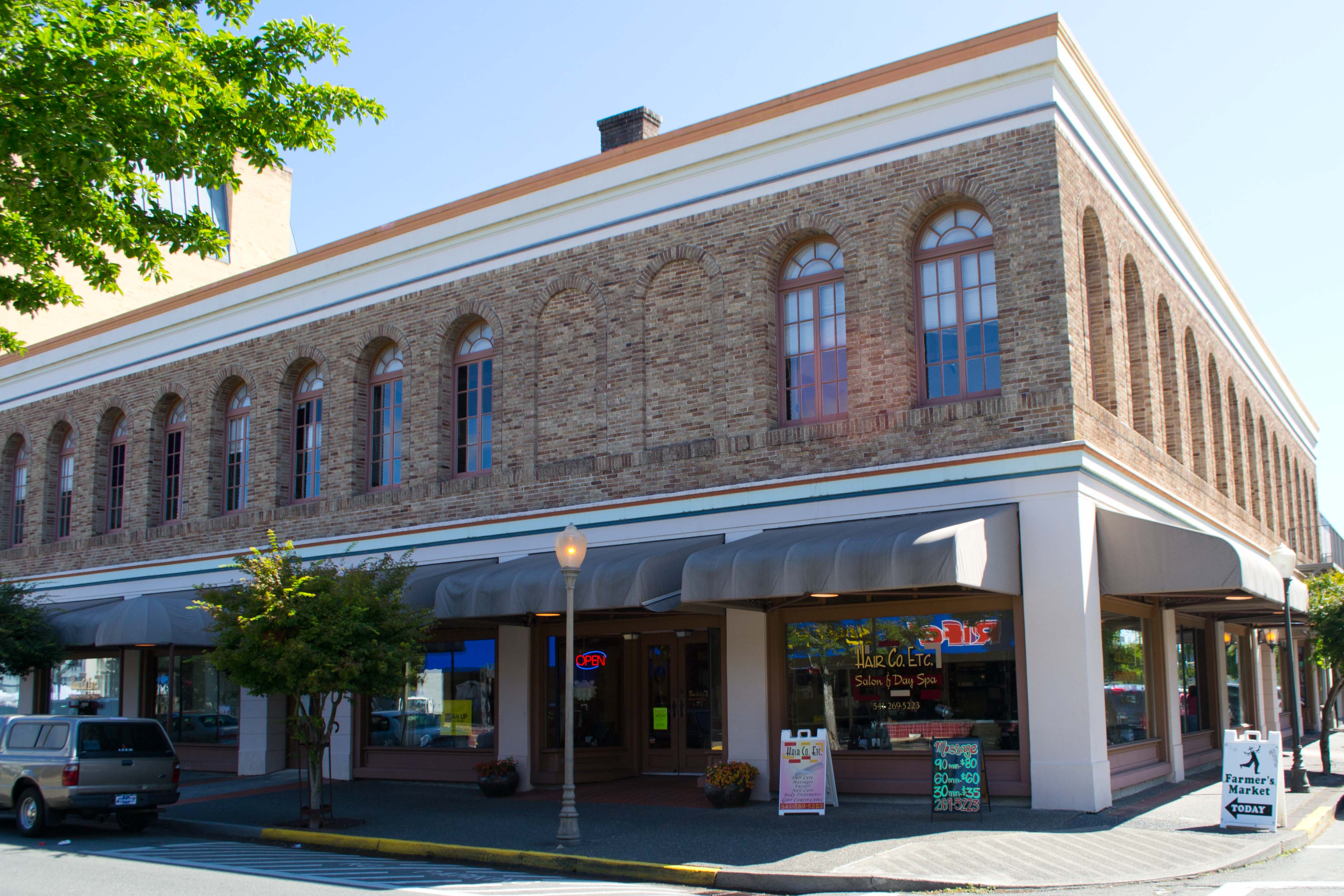
- The Marshfield Elks Temple in 2012
- Location: 195 S. 2nd Street; Coos Bay, Oregon
- Coordinates: 43°22′03″N 124°12′50″W
- Area: less than one acre
- Built: 1919-20
- Architect: William Garnett Chandler
- Architectural style: Georgian Revival
- NRHP reference No.: 83002146
- Added to NRHP: May 19, 1983

The Marshfield Elks Temple, also known as B.P.O.E. Lodge No. 1160, is a two-story Georgian Revival building in Coos Bay, Oregon that was built during 1919–20. It was listed on the National Register of Historic Places in 1983.

It was designed by architect William G. Chandler (1884-1959). In 1982, it was being renovated to serve as the headquarters of the Security Bank of Coos County.

Chandler also designed the NRHP-listed J. S. Coke Building, nearby at 150 Central Ave. in Coos Bay.
