= Elks-Rogers Hotel =

- U.S. National Register of Historic Places
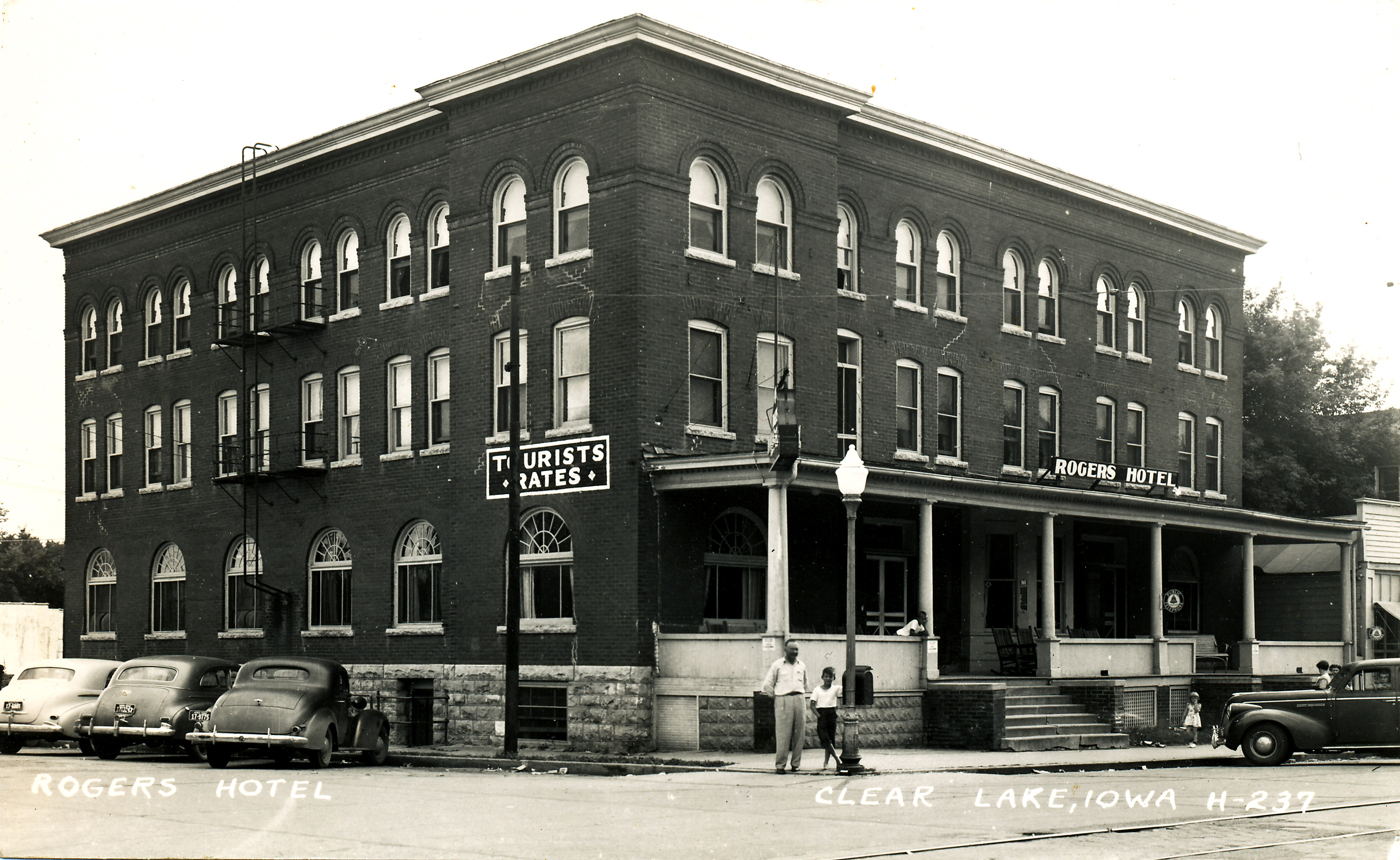

- Location within Iowa Location within the United States
- Location: 223 Main Ave. Clear Lake, Iowa
- Coordinates: 43°8′8″N 93°22′54″W
- Area: less than one acre
- Built: 1901
- Architectural style: Late Victorian
- NRHP reference No.: 82002611
- Added to NRHP: June 21, 1982

The Elks-Rogers Hotel, also known as Park Hotel of Clear Lake, was a resort hotel in Clear Lake, Iowa, built in 1901. It was "a classic piece of late Victorian architecture often found in the trans-Mississippi West." It had brick walls (made of soft brick of the area), fan windows, and a large porch with Doric columns.

It was listed on the National Register of Historic Places in 1982. At the time of its nomination to the National Register, it was the last surviving resort hotel of its era in the state, because the others had been demolished.

This structure has been demolished. A neighboring business location reported that it was torn down in about 1997. A modern brick structure replaced it and is the location for the VFW.

It is still listed in the National Register.
