= Elks Building and Theater =

Opera house and performing arts center in Prescott, Arizona

Elks Theater and Performing Arts Center
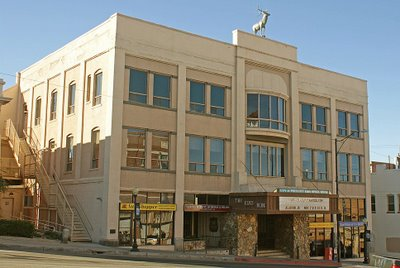
- Interactive map of Elks Theater and Performing Arts Center
- Address: 117 E. Gurley St.
- Location: Prescott, Arizona
- Type: Theater and Performing Arts Center

Construction
- Built: 1904

Website
- www.prescottelkstheater.com
- Elks Building and Theater
- U.S. National Register of Historic Places
- Location within Arizona Location within the United States
- Coordinates: 34.541799°N 112.467771°W
- Area: 0 acres (0 ha)
- Built: c.1905
- Architectural style: Early Commercial
- MPS: Prescott Territorial Buildings MRA
- NRHP reference No.: 78003226
- Added to NRHP: December 14, 1978

The Prescott Elks Theater and Performing Arts Center is a classically designed turn of the 20th century opera house seating over 500. Completed in 1905 and listed on the National Register of Historic Places as Elks Building and Theater, it was one of many "Elks' Opera Houses" across the country. Now over a hundred years later only one still exists.

The theater in the beginning was the host to minstrel shows, balls, plays and theater performances. Movies arrived with the silent era about 1915. In 1929 sound was added and the "talkies" had arrived. Movies continued to be shown till the 1980s. After many changes of private ownerships the opera house was turned over to Arizona Community Foundation in the early 1980s. Then began the effort to return the opera house to its original glory. The opera house was purchased by the City of Prescott in 2001. The Foundation in partnership with the City began the restoration with the lobby, green room, dressing rooms and other parts of the building. Restoration was finally completed by the Foundation and the City in 2010.

A $1.75 million renovation of the theatre in the building was completed in 2010.

In 2012 the City sold the buildings to a non profit, The Elks Theater and Performing Arts Center (ETPAC). The theater restoration completed, the ETPAC then began plans to renovate and restore the three-story Elks Lodge #330.

The new restoration project continued through 2016 when in December all construction was completed. Added to the lodge were two state of the art professional dance studios; one with a floating Hickory dance floor and the other with a "sprung Marley" surface. Each studio is self-contained with its own adjustable lighting, heat and air conditioning and state of the art sound systems. Also found on the second floor are five Wenger music and voice isolation practice booths. Plans are in the works to include a digital recording board.

The third floor of the ETPAC sports two separate banquet halls with a total floor capacity of 200 people and a whole floor sound system. A brand new chef's kitchen was also installed on the third floor, with warming ovens, grills, griddles and more.

During the remodel every effort was made to save and restore the original construction where possible. That is why you will find the original barrel ceilings with tin stamp found in other parts of the building still in place. The renovation also uncovered a hidden staircase that was saved along with the original stained glass "clock" that was placed in the building by the Brotherhood of Elks. It points to 11 o'clock when in Elks' traditional a toast is made to absent members."Bill" the original locally sourced copper Elk still lives on the roof of the performing arts center.

The ETPAC is a 501c3 charitable organization. As part of the purchase agreement an endowment was set up for the perpetual operation and maintenance of the theater and performing arts center.

The mission of the ETPAC is to enhance the community of Prescott by providing space for practice, rehearsal and training of the performing arts.

The Elks Theater and Performing Arts Center on East Gurley Street in Prescott, Arizona is a three-story Early Commercial style building built in c.1905. It is approximately 95 feet (29 m) wide and 125 feet (38 m) deep. It was listed on the National Register of Historic Places in 1978.
