= B. P. O. E. Building (Bellingham, Washington) =

- U.S. National Register of Historic Places
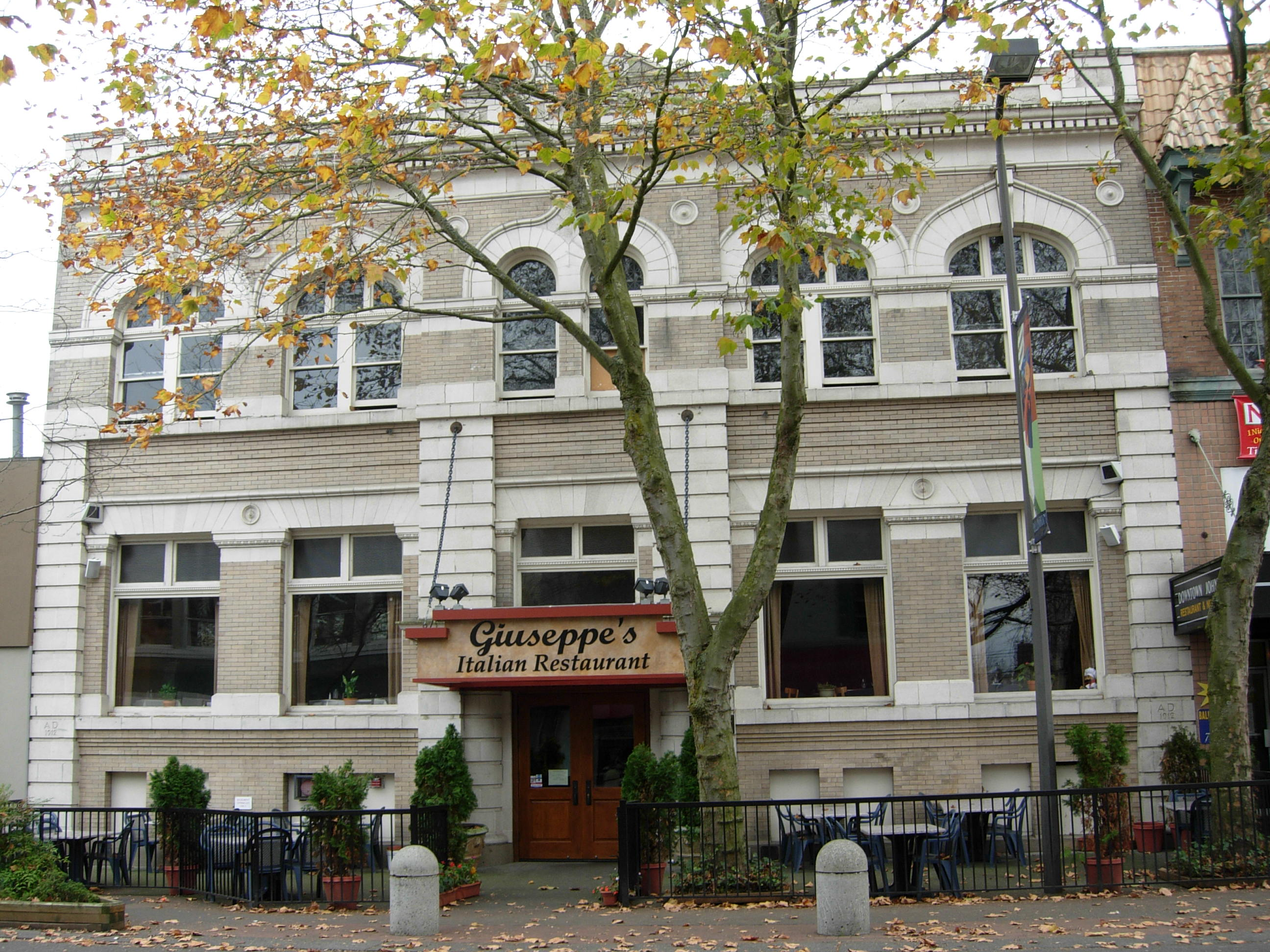
- Location: 1412-1414 Cornwall Bellingham, Washington
- Coordinates: 48°45′5″N 122°28′36″W
- Built: 1912
- Architect: William Cox
- Architectural style: Beaux Arts, Neo-classical
- NRHP reference No.: 92000282
- Added to NRHP: March 26, 1992

The B. P. O. E. Building, otherwise known as the Elks Club was originally built for the Bellingham chapter of the Benevolent and Protective Order of Elks in 1912, during the city's second major building boom. It is located within the vicinity of the old Federal Building on Cornwall Avenue, historically known as Dock Street. The Elks no longer occupy the building and it is now home to the Bellingham campus of Evergreen Beauty College and Bellingham Axe. It was listed on the National Register of Historic Places on March 26, 1992.

== History ==
Bellingham Bay Lodge #542 of the B.P.O.E. was instituted on February 10, 1900 with twenty members. The lodge met in the Masonic Hall on the south side of town before moving into new quarters in the newly completed Rice Block, adjacent to the Beck Theatre, on Dock (now Cornwall) Street in 1906. Membership increased rapidly and by 1909, the Elks were in need of a larger meeting space and decided to build their own building. As soon as funds allowed, the lodge set out to secure a site and build a new lodge building. Bonds were issued to lodge members only and fund-raising began in the form minstrel shows put on by the Elks. Local newspapers at the time reported their intention for a building "... at least three stories in height. However, and it is possible that it will be four stories high." The lodge failed to secure enough funds and the project was put off for several more years.

In February, 1912, the Elks purchased a lot on Dock Street across from the recently completed Federal Building for $10,000 with plans to begin building a lodge immediately. Local architect William Cox was chosen to plan the building which would include: "A high ceiling basement, plentifully lighted, a ground floor some five feet above the sidewalk line and a second floor designed for lodge room purposes and nine living rooms for members who desire to live at the club." The basement would contain a large gymnasium and bowling alley and all rooms were to be finished with dark Mahogany. The facade would be composed of pressed cream-colored brick and terra cotta trimmings. A marquee over the main entrance with "Elks Club" spelled out in art glass was an original feature of the building, since removed. Cox visited many others Elks Lodges in the state to aid with his designs.

By late May 1912, Cox's plans were complete and a call was made for construction bids. The construction contract was awarded to H. Tweedy. Construction began in June 1912 and with the building well under way, the cornerstone was laid on September 1 with ex-governor Albert E. Mead addressing the crowd. The ceremony was concluded with the singing of "Auld Lang Syne" by the Elks quartet. By early 1913, the building was complete and the Elks held their first meeting in their new home. It was formally dedicated on March 25, 1913 with nearly 1,000 Elks from lodges statewide in attendance.

In 1938, the interior of the building was remodeled as well as the replacement of the marquee with a new art deco one. By the late 1940s the bowling alley was gone and in the 1960s the kitchen was moved from the second to the first floor. The Elks sold their building in 1971 and relocated to a smaller building on Samish Way, in proximity of Interstate 5. Following a brief occupancy by the Castle Restaurant, the Elks Building sat vacant until 1976 and has housed a succession of businesses, A teenage nightclub "The Vortex". The building at that time was owned by Janik of Sedro-Woolley, WA until sold to Captain and Geller for $135,000. They operated a Teenage Nightclub "club USA" and "Whirla whip" ice cream in the front part of the building on the right side. Captain and Geller sold the Building under an agreement with the city of Bellingham it was to be a building for the city with a federal grant the city became the new owners around 1989 then it was mostly restaurants, since then.
