= Elks Lodge No. 607 =

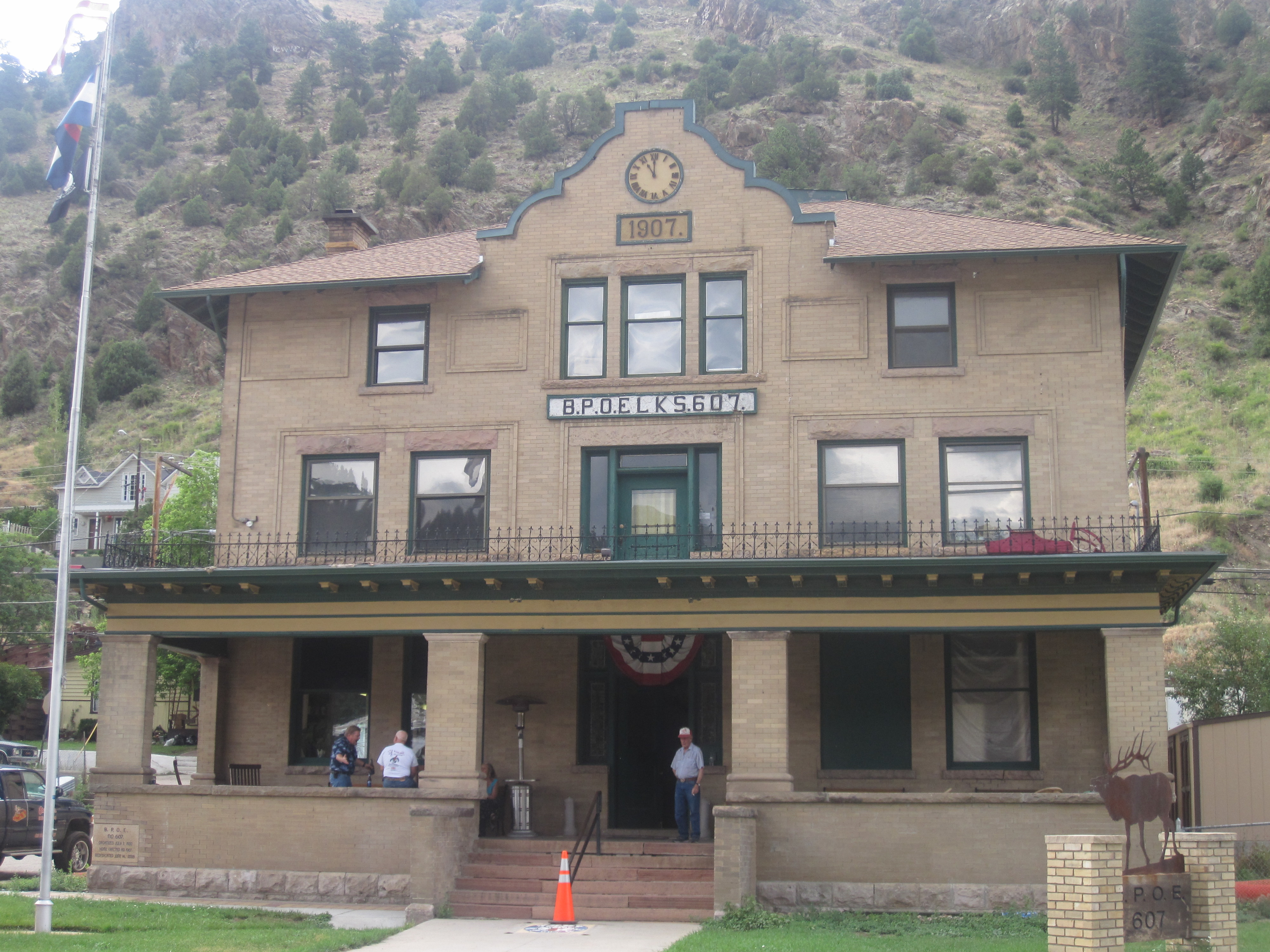

- Location within Colorado
- 39.743074°N 105.51585°W
- Location: 1600 Colorado Blvd., Idaho Springs, Colorado

History
- Built: 1907

Elks Lodge No. 607 is a historic building in Idaho Springs, Colorado. It was built in 1907.

Before the site was the Elks Lodge, it was the Beebe House Hotel. President Ulysses S. Grant stayed there in 1873.
