= Elks Victory Lodge–Ruby's Grill Building =

- U.S. National Register of Historic Places
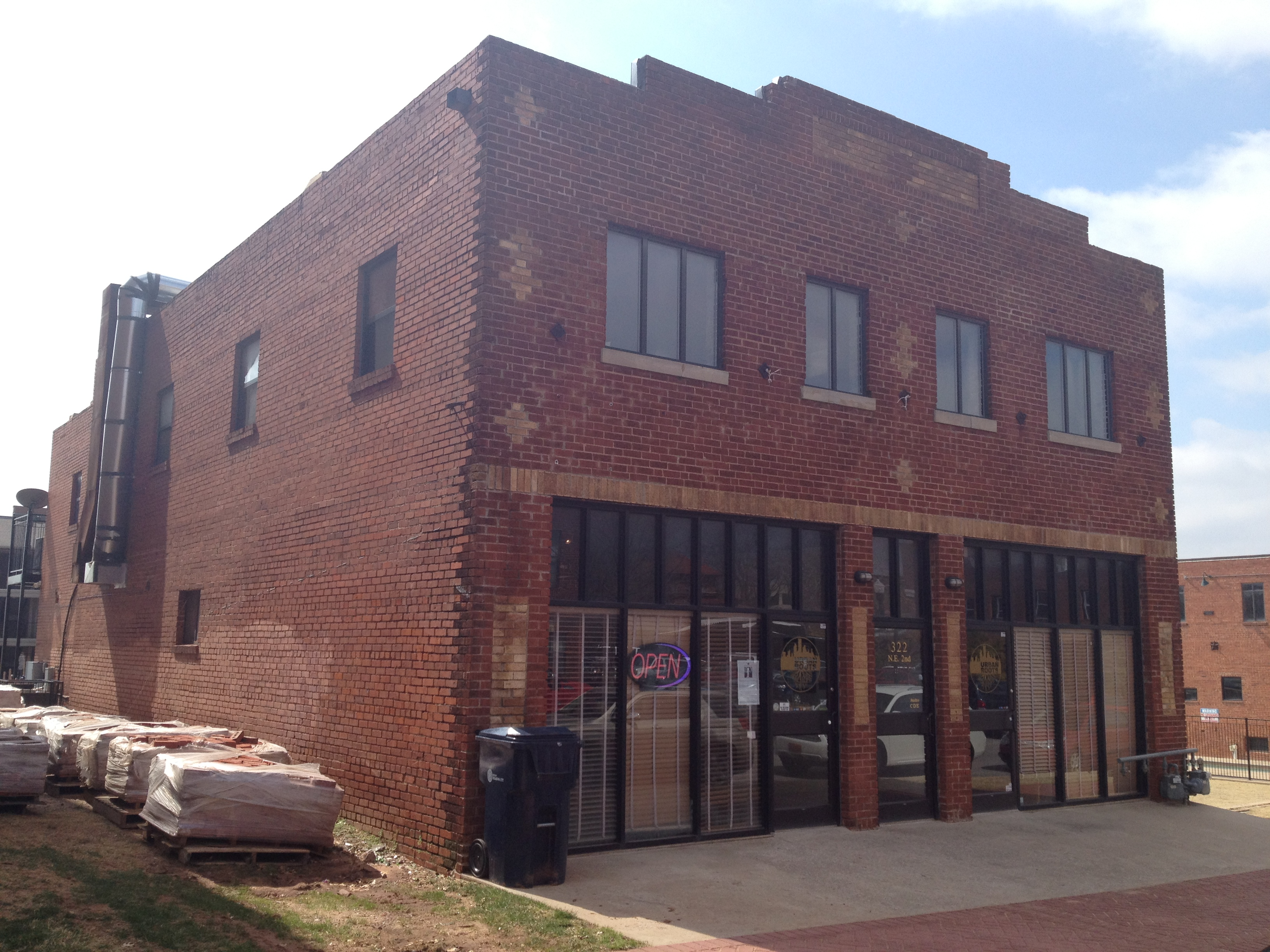

- Location within Oklahoma
- Location: 322 NE 2nd, Oklahoma City, Oklahoma
- Coordinates: 35°28′10″N 97°30′22″W
- Area: less than one acre
- Built: 1929
- Architect: Slaughter, Wyatt H.
- NRHP reference No.: 95001498
- Added to NRHP: January 11, 1996

The Elks Victory Lodge–Ruby's Grill Building is a two-story, commercial brick structure in northeast Oklahoma City, Oklahoma.

Built in 1929 by Dr. Wyatt H. Slaughter, a prominent African-American physician and businessman, the building was a center of African-American life in northeast Oklahoma City. It housed the Victory Lodge of the Improved Benevolent Protective Order of Elks of the World. It later served as a specialty store and restaurant space.

It was listed on the National Register of Historic Places in 1996.
