= Kenosha Elks Club =

- Kenosha Elks Club building in 1938

- Location within Wisconsin
- 42.583517°N 87.821156°W
- Location: 5706 Eighth Ave, Kenosha, Wisconsin, US

History
- Built: 1917

Site notes
- Architect(s): R. Messmer & Bros.
- Architectural style: Georgian Revival

The Kenosha Elks Club is a historic clubhouse in Kenosha, Wisconsin, United States. Construction began on the building in 1916 and it was formally dedicated on January 20, 1919.

== History as the Elks Club ==
Plans to construct a clubhouse for the Kenosha chapter of the Benevolent and Protective Order of Elks began in 1916 when 300 members pledged $65,000 for the purchase of land that formerly housed the Petit Malt House, which burned down in 1914. The land was purchased for $41,000 in June 1916 and by fall of that year, building plans by R. Messmer & Brothers had been improved and the Immel Construction Company had begun work on the site. A cornerstone was laid in June 1917, and on January 20, 1919, the club dedicated the building, which featured a hotel, swimming pool, and numerous dining facilities. Zalmon G. Simmons, founder of the Simmons Bedding Company, was among the men who made up the Building Committee.

The building is red brick, four stories tall, with Georgian Revival styling. The first story is rusticated brick, somewhat resembling Richardsonian Romanesque styling. The corners are decorated with quoin patterns in the brickwork. The front portico is the striking feature, with two-story Doric columns on square brick piers, and behind them brick pilasters framing round-arched windows with fanlights.

In April 1929, the club held a gathering that drew Elks officials from all over the country to ceremoniously burn the mortgage on the building.

Sometime after 1938, the building was renovated and expanded, with an addition being constructed on the southwest side to house a larger kitchen.

Throughout the years, the Elks Club played host to numerous special guests, including Mel Tormé and Colonel Sanders.

== 1990s to present ==
=== Financial struggles, renaming, and abandonment ===
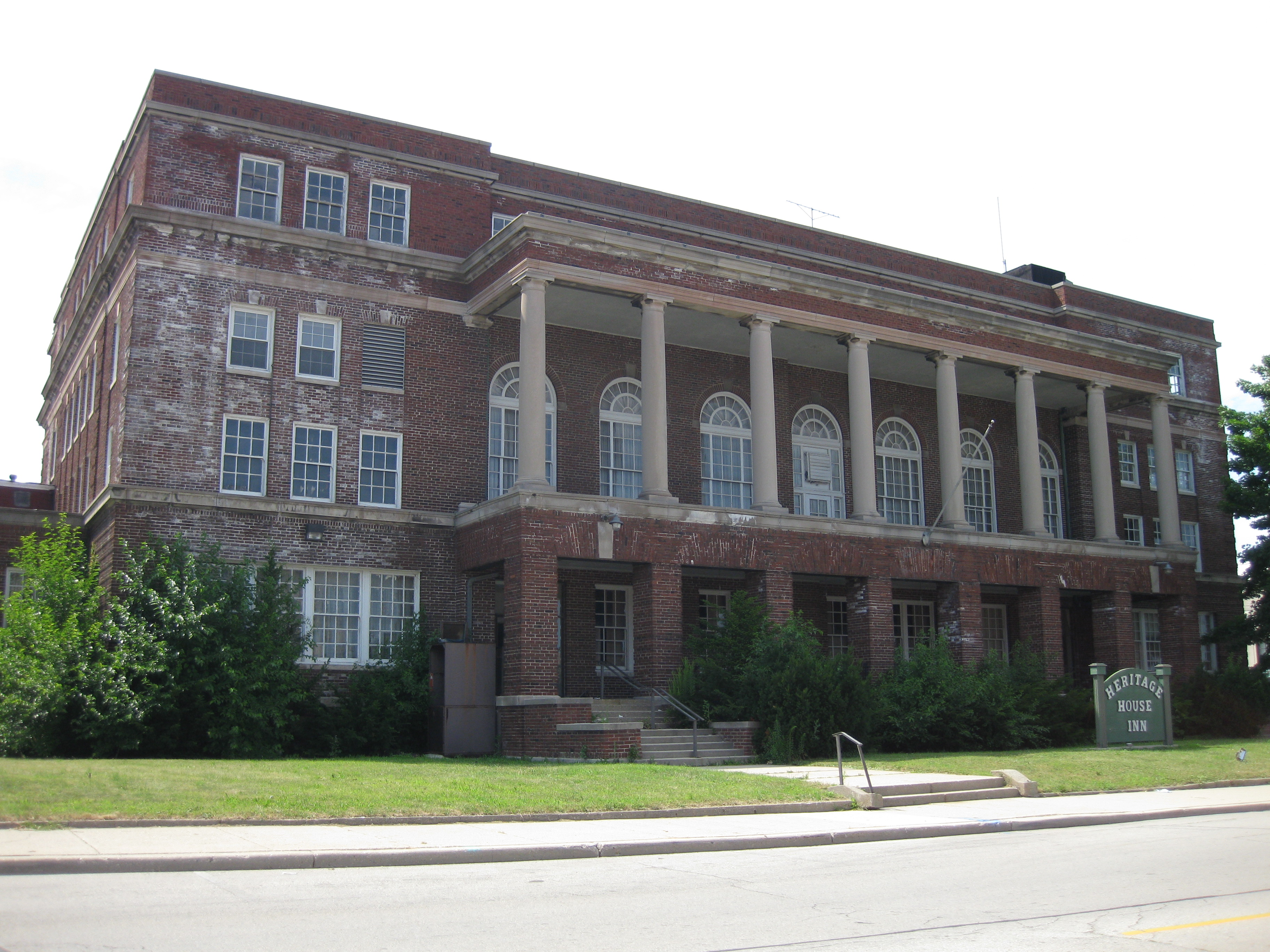
The building in 2008, out of use again after its stint as the Heritage House Inn

By the early 1990s, the club was experiencing financial problems, so the building was sold during that time. Afterward, the property passed through a number of owners and at some point was renamed the Heritage House Inn. Following a failed attempt to launch a restaurant, the owners allowed the building to deteriorate, neglecting to turn off water service in the winter, which led to burst pipes.

In the late 1990s, the building was sold to local philanthropist Andrea Christensen, whose husband owned a local sheet metal factory. Christensen invested hundreds of thousands of dollars into the building, repairing the damage caused by the neglect from previous owners. The building was then leased out to a local restaurant and used as a banquet facility.

During its time as a banquet hall, the building still saw many notable guests. In April 2000, then-Speaker of the House Dennis Hastert spoke at a dinner for a Republican group.

In the mid-2000s, the restaurant operating the banquet facility closed. At that point, the building and its property fell into disuse and abandonment.

=== Fire ===
During the afternoon of October 28, 2011, a member of the Kenosha Fire Department was passing by the building when they noticed smoke pouring out of windows on the upper floor. Five separate departments from the surrounding communities responded to the fire, which was "confined mainly to space between supporting timbers and multiple layers of flooring on the second floor" in an area that was almost in the center of the second-floor ballroom. The fire largely damaged the floor of the second-floor ballroom and the spaces occupied by multiple themed dining rooms below. Local radio station WGTD-AM also reported at the time of the fire that the building had recently become a "haven" for the homeless.

=== Preservation and revitalization ===
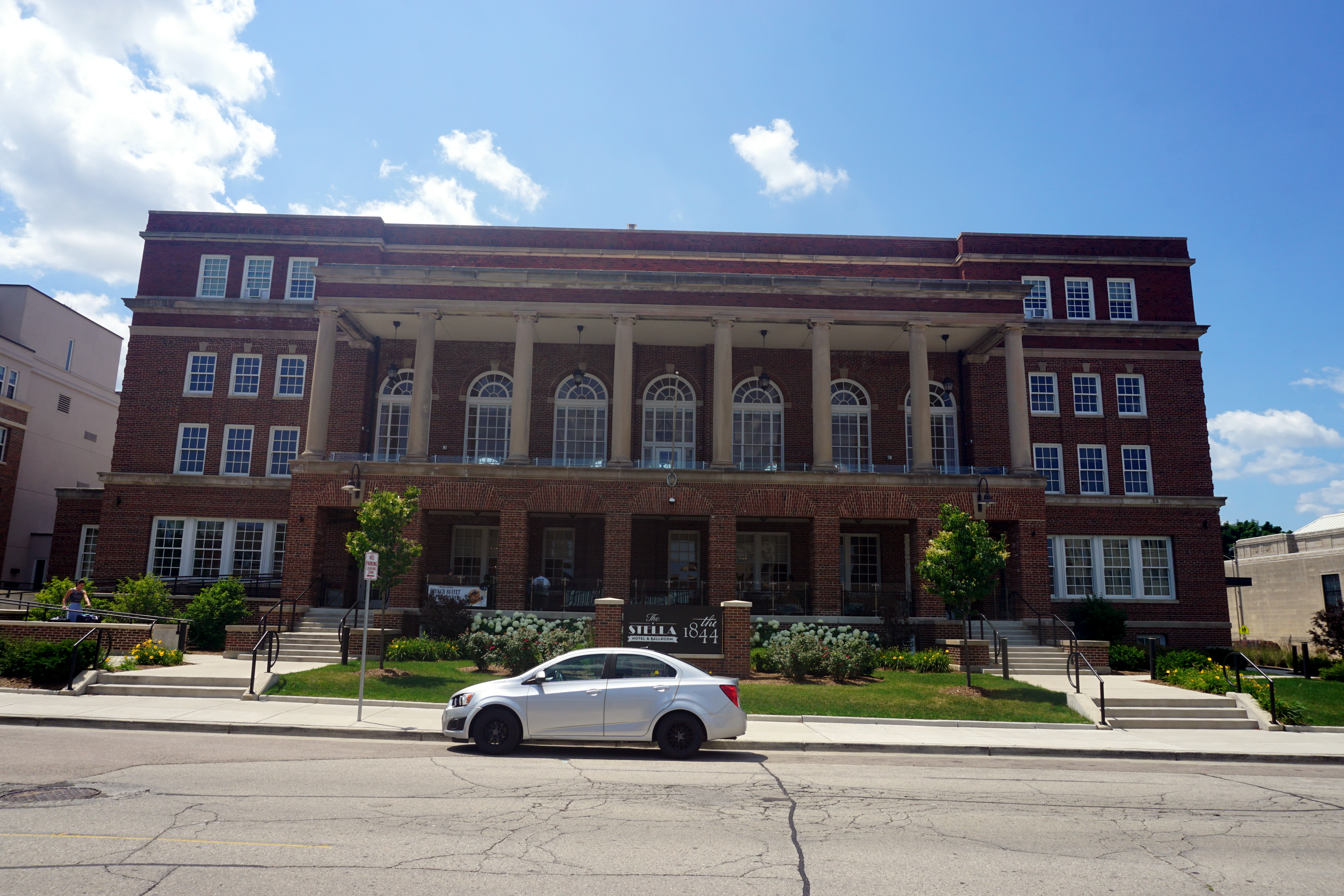
The Stella Hotel & Ballroom, formerly the Kenosha Elks Club, in 2022

The City of Kenosha issued a raze order on December 23, 2011, at which point a group calling themselves "Preserve the Elks" formed to save the building from demolition. On March 22, 2012, Kenosha's Historic Preservation Committee voted 4–1 to delay the vote on supporting or opposing the demolition by 120 days.

The City of Kenosha reported that they have fielded "several calls" from parties interested in seeing the building.

The building was listed on the National Register of Historic Places in 2017.

In the summer of 2018, the building was restored and renamed the Stella Hotel & Ballroom, which opened in early 2019.
