= Elks Lodge (Ouray, Colorado) =

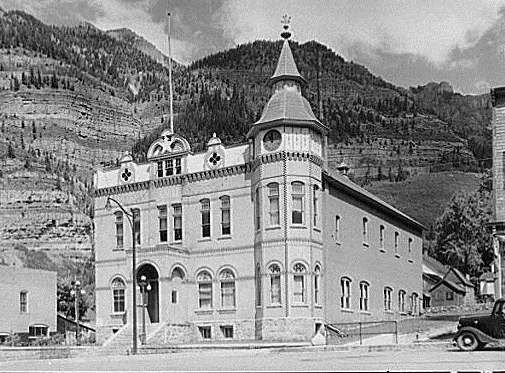
- Elks Lodge in 1940

- Location within Colorado
- 38°01′16″N 107°40′16″W
- Location: 421 Main Street, Ouray, Colorado

History
- Built: 1904

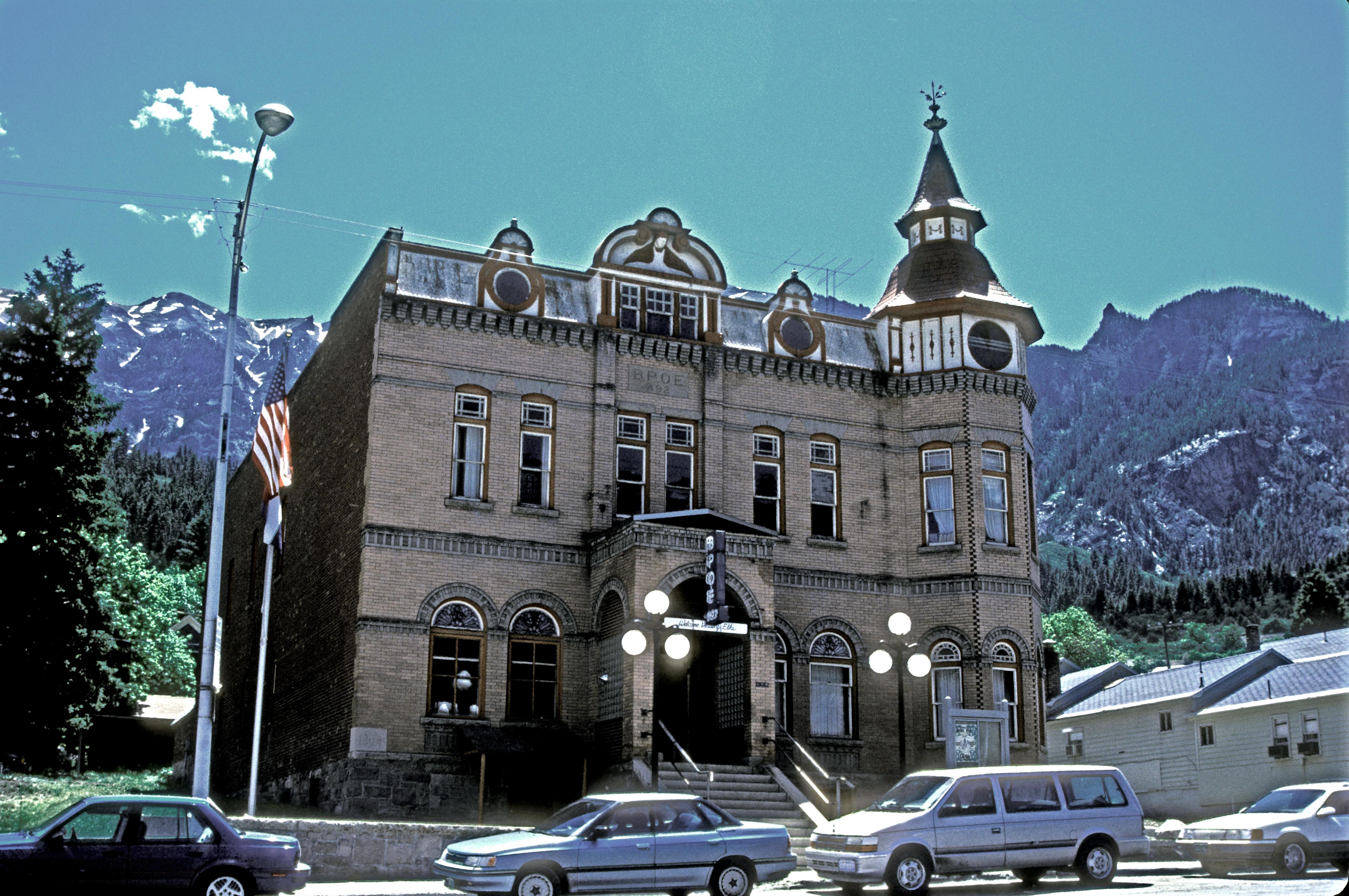
Lodge in 2007

The Elks Lodge #492 in Ouray, Colorado was built in 1904. It is located in the Ouray Historic District which was listed by the National Register of Historic Places on October 6, 1983.

It serves the Elks group in Ouray, founded in 1899.
