= Museo Pambata =

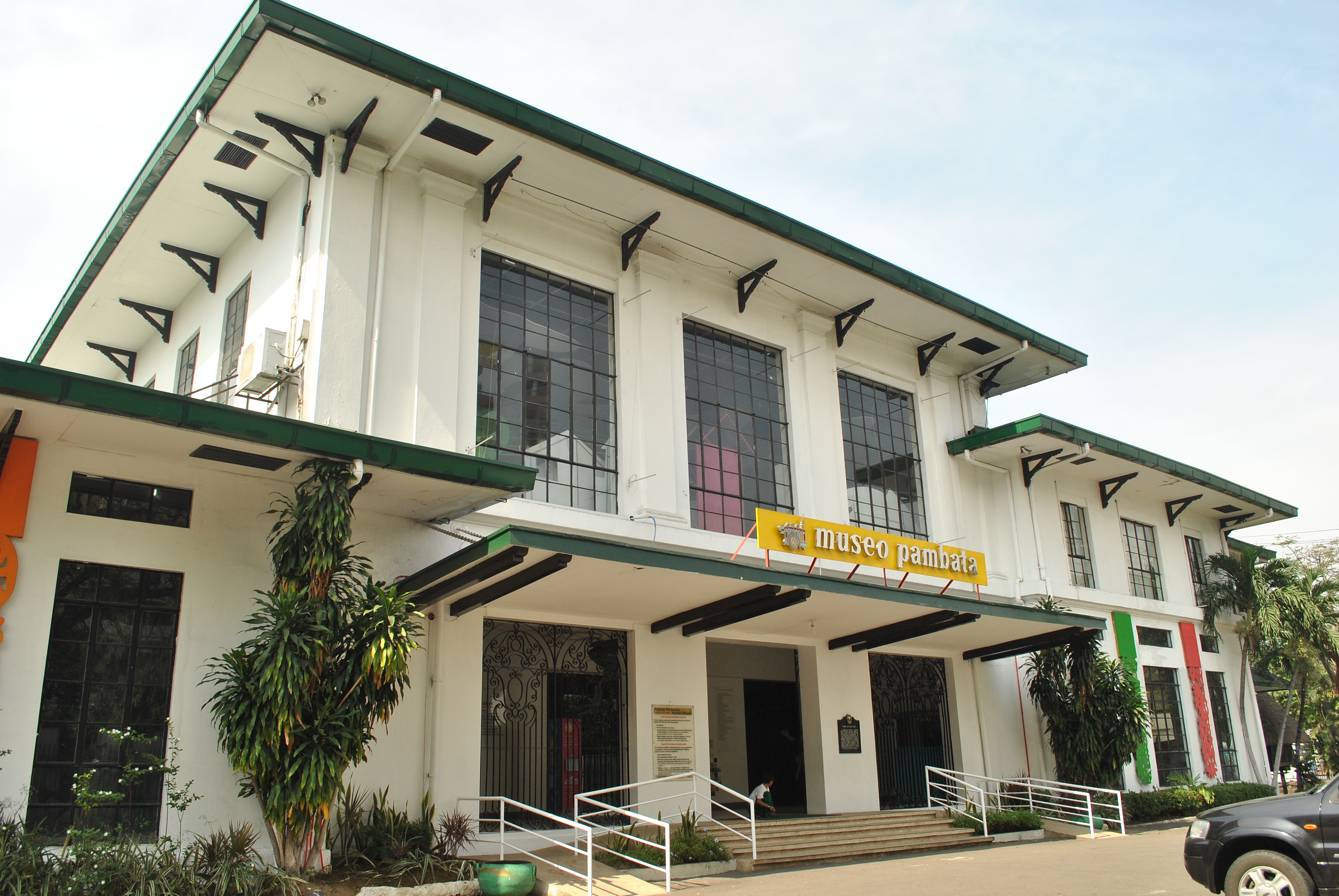
- The Museo Pambata, located in the historic Elks Club Building.
- Established: 1993
- Location: Ermita, Manila, Philippines
- Coordinates: 14°34′45″N 120°58′38″E
- Type: Children's museum
- Website: museopambata.org

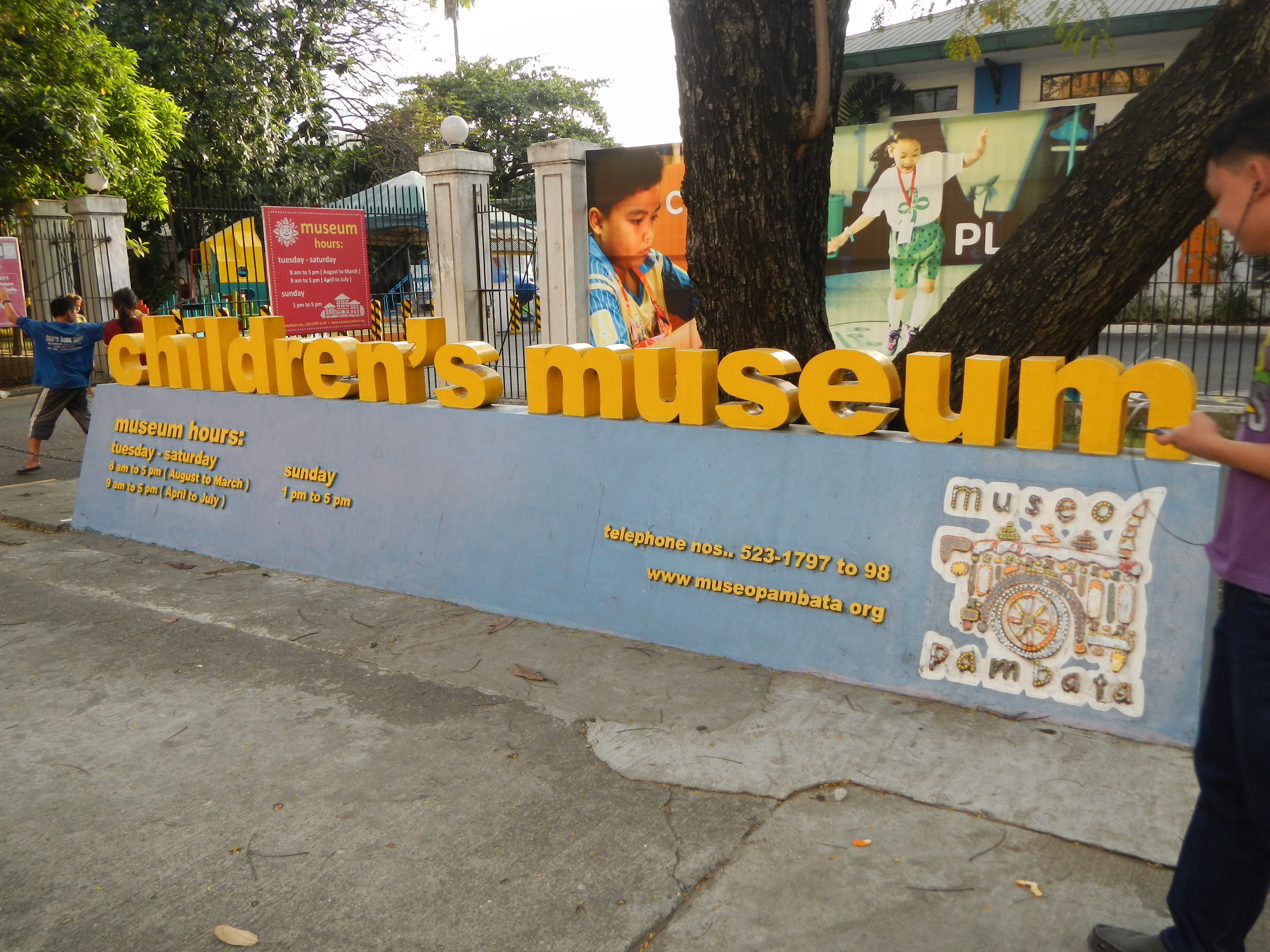
Sign for the Museo Pambata children's museum, on Roxas Boulevard, Manila

The Museo Pambata (lit. 'Children's Museum') is a children's museum in the Ermita district of Manila, near Rizal Park, in the Philippines. It is located in the former Elks Club Building, a historic structure built in 1910, along Roxas Boulevard at the corner of South Drive.

== Background ==
The Museo Pambata is a children's interactive museum that provides an alternative to formal classroom learning. It features hands-on exhibits that encourage children to explore and discover various concepts, from anatomy and career paths to science and the arts. The museum also has regular programs and events for various sectors.

== History ==
Opened in 1994, Museo Pambata was envisioned by Nina Lim-Yuson, an early childhood educator, who was inspired after visiting the Boston Children’s Museum in the United States and wished for a similar place in the Philippines.

In March 1993, Yuson, along with her mother, former Department of Social Welfare and Development secretary Estefania Aldaba-Lim, presented a proposal for the museum to then-Manila Mayor Alfredo Lim. Mayor Lim approved the proposal, granting them the use of the historic Elks Club Building in Manila.

A Board of Trustees was formed in June 1993, comprising educators, artists, and professionals who developed the museum's concept. Architect and stage designer Joselito Tecson designed the initial theme rooms pro bono. In December 1993, the Manila City Council approved a memorandum of agreement (MOA) granting Museo Pambata a 10-year lease-free use of the Elks Club Building, allowing rehabilitation work to begin using privately raised funds.

A recognition dinner for the museum's first "Ninongs and Ninangs" (sponsors who gave one million pesos each) was held in March 1994. These founding sponsors included the Luis H. Lim Foundation, Juan and Lualhati Cojuangco Foundation, A.Y. Foundation, Petron Corporation, and others.

On December 21, 1994, the museum officially opened its doors.

In March 2012, Museo Pambata received a Special Commendation from the jury of the first Children’s Museum Award in Bologna, Italy, for "inspiring the creation of new children’s museums in the Philippines and Asia.”

Museo Pambata also received a Best Soft Power Cultural Organization nomination in the 2016 Leading Cultural Destinations Awards, which have been called "the Oscars for museums."

The museum temporarily closed during the COVID-19 pandemic in 2020. After extensive renovations, it reopened on December 6, 2024, to celebrate its 30th anniversary. The reopening introduced new and refurbished exhibits, including a rock-climbing wall and a "Bahay na Bato" section.

== Theme Rooms ==
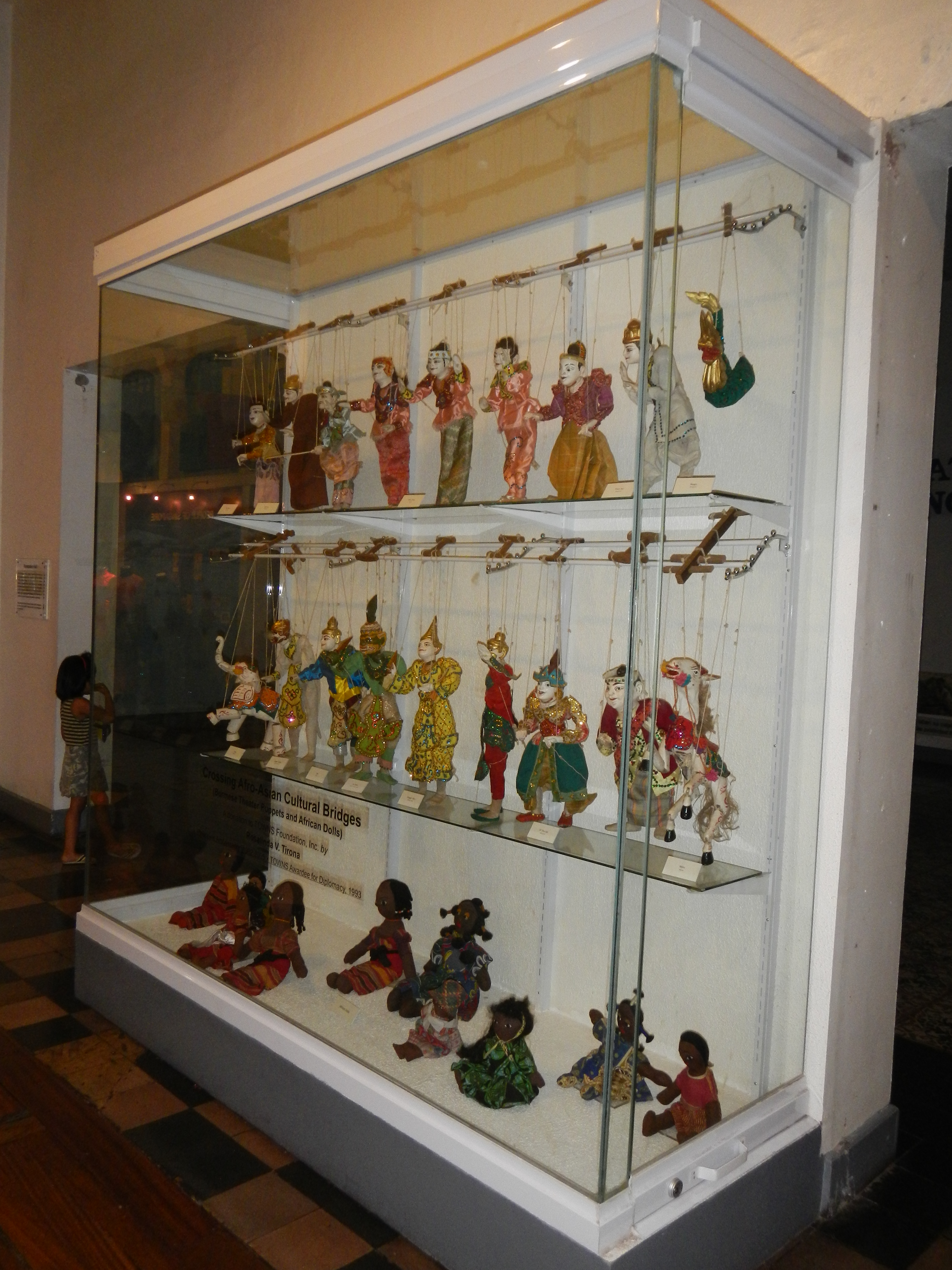
Marionettes display in the children's museum

There are eight theme rooms in Museo Pambata, namely:

- Kalikasan (Environment) and Karagatan (Under the Sea) - Contains a simulated rain forest and seabed where visitors can learn about environmental concerns and ecological conservation.
- Maynila Noon (Old Manila) - Visitors can learn about history by looking at artifacts and simulated exhibits depicting turn-of-the-century Manila, including a miniature bahay na bato and a galleon.
- Paglaki Ko (Career Options) - Showcases various careers and encourages visitors to visualize themselves doing a particular job.
- I Love My Planet Earth - Where visitors can learn about climate change and how one can take part in caring for the planet.
- Pamilihang Bayan (Marketplace) - Features a row of play stores and shops where children can pretend to be a store owner and practice their entrepreneurial skills.
- Katawan Ko (My Body Works) - Features interactive displays about the human body, how various organs work, and pointers on healthcare.
- Bata sa Mundo (Children in the Global Village) - Dolls from around the world are displayed in this room.
- Tuklas (Discovery) - A new room focusing on science, technology, engineering, and mathematics (STEM).

The museum also has a children's library, changing exhibits hall, a gift shop, venues for events, and a playground.

== Programs ==
=== Children's Rights ===
Museo Pambata’s educational programs are anchored on the advocacy of children’s rights, primarily their right to education, health, and recreation. A dedicated space, the Karapatan Hall, hosts activities focused on these rights. Past projects included the Rights of the Child Awareness Tournament (1995) and "Mag-ROCK Tayo!" (2001-2002), which familiarized children with the UN Convention on the Rights of the Child, in cooperation with agencies like the Council for the Welfare of Children (CWC), UNICEF, and the Department of Education (DepEd).

In November 2009, the museum held "Kanino ba ang CRC?", a three-day children’s summit celebrating the 20th anniversary of the Convention on the Rights of the Child.

=== Literacy Programs ===
The Mobile Library Program, started in 1995, is a reading campaign for economically disadvantaged children in Manila. A roving library van, inaugurated in 2001 through a grant from Ford Foundation Philippines, brings over 3,000 children’s books and learning materials to various communities.

In 1999, the museum, in partnership with the office of Manila Mayor Lito Atienza, launched Sa Aklat Sisikat!, a city-wide literacy campaign for public schools to address declining reading abilities.

== In popular culture ==
Prelude and epilogue scenes of some episodes of the ABS-CBN education series, Bayani, were shot at Museo Pambata, most notably during the show's season specializing in modern heroes and collective heroism.
