= Elks Club Building (Manila) =

Historic building in Manila, Philippines

Coordinates: 14°34′45″N 120°58′38″E

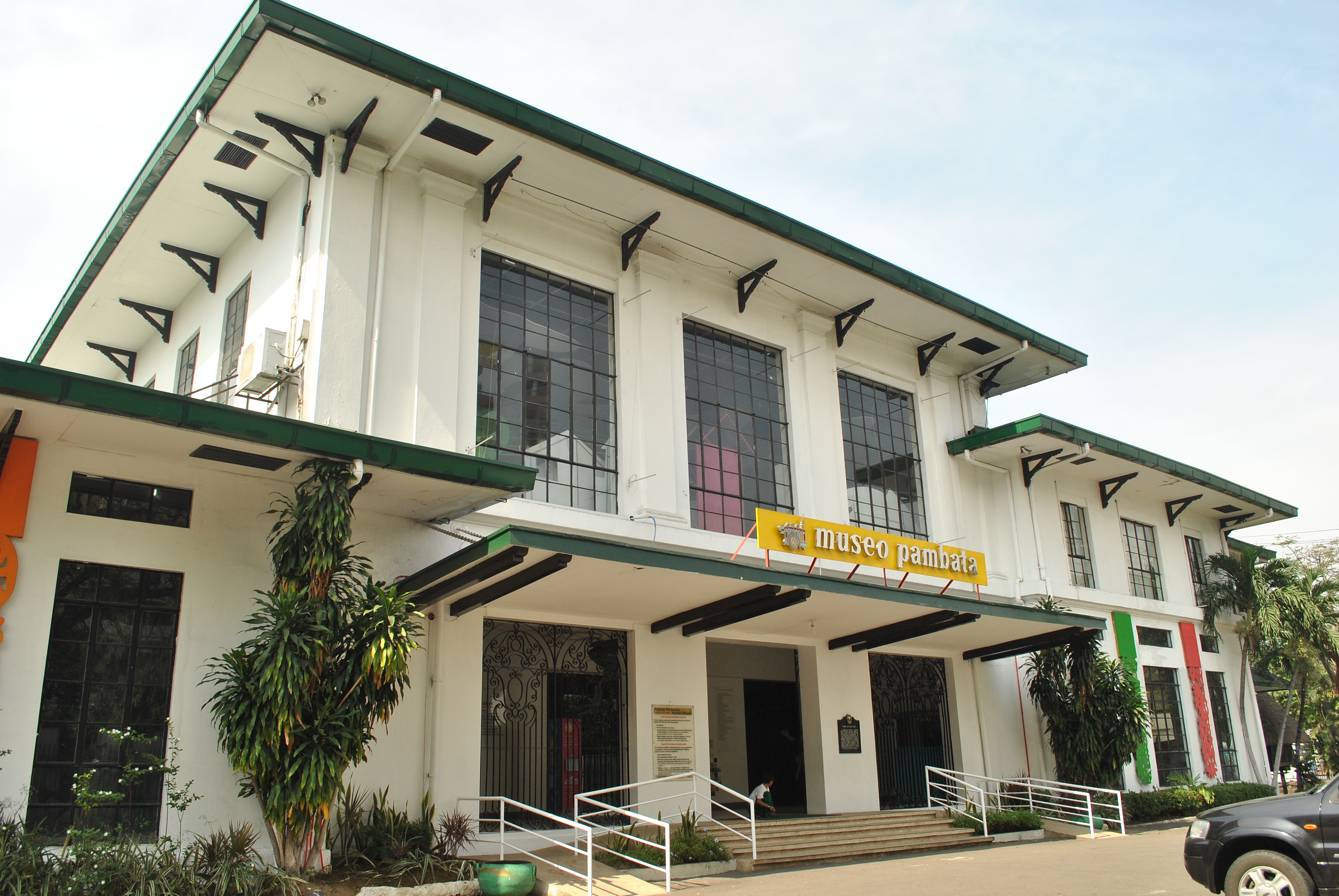
- Interactive map of the Elks Club Building area

General information
- Architectural style: Mission Revival
- Location: Roxas Boulevard cor. South Drive, Manila, Philippines
- Current tenants: Museo Pambata
- Named for: Elks Club
- Completed: 1949

Technical details
- Floor count: 2

Design and construction
- Architect: William E. Parsons

The Elks Club Building is the former clubhouse of the Manila Elks Lodge #761—Manila Lodge 761, also known as the Manila Elks Club, located in Manila, Philippines. It was designed by William E. Parsons.

The Manila Elks Lodge #761 is a branch club of the Benevolent and Protective Order of Elks (BPOE), an American fraternal order.

== History ==
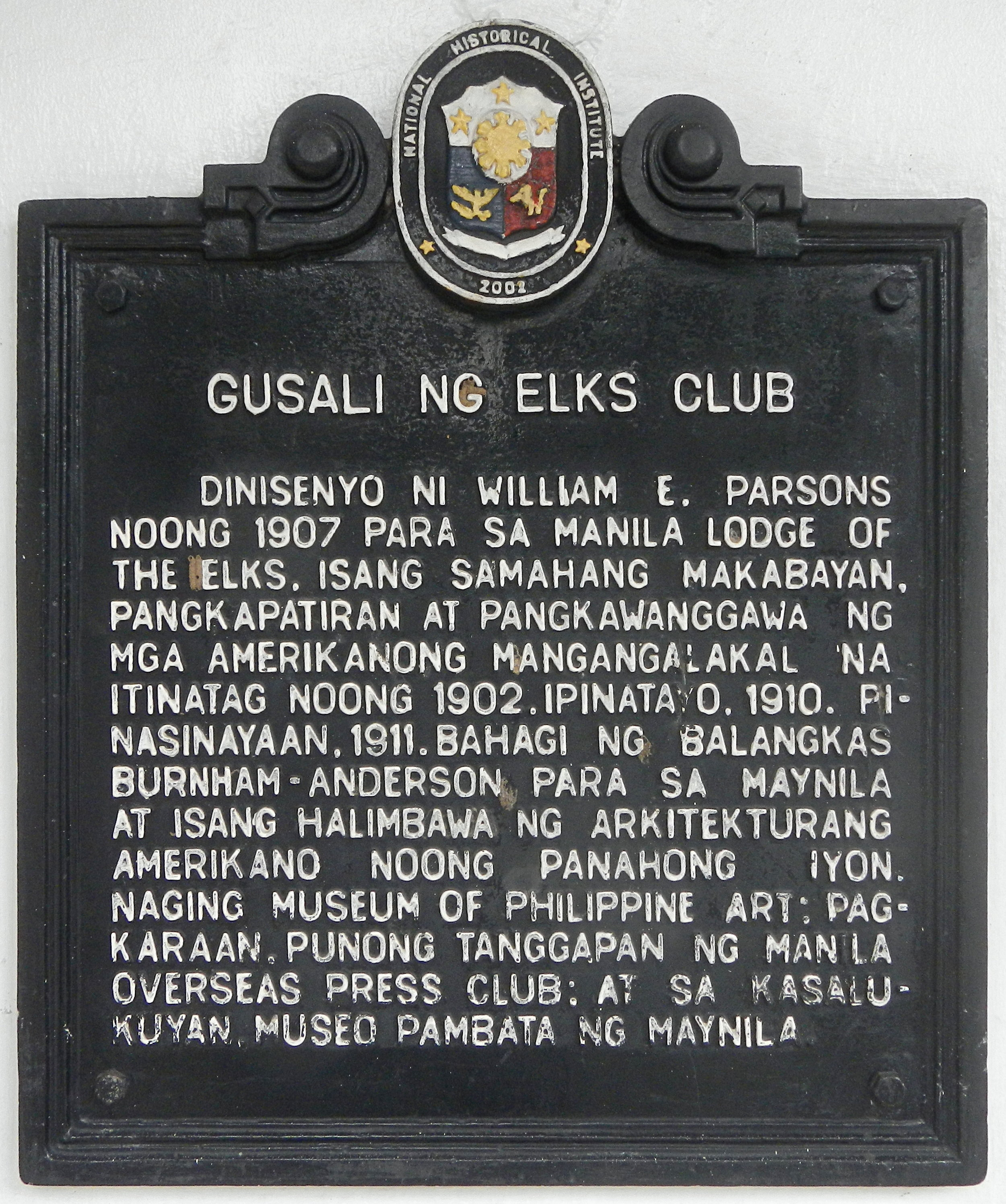
Historical marker

The Manila Elks Club was founded after the Spanish–American War ended in 1898, which resulted in the transfer of the Spanish Philippines to the United States control. In 1901, a group of Americans residing in Manila petitioned the Benevolent and Protective Order of Elks national organization to allow the founding of an Elks Club in the Philippines, receiving authorization in 1905.

Around 1910, the Manila Elks Club purchased land to build a clubhouse in the Luneta Park extension, in the Ermita District of Manila. In 1910, the Manila Elks Club completed its three-story Mission Revival style building. Following the proposed Manila Plan of Daniel Burnham, the 1910 Elks Club building was similar to the Manila Army and Navy Club co-located on the same piece of property.

After the inauguration of the Commonwealth of the Philippines, ending the U.S. territorial Insular Government of the Philippine Islands, this clubhouse was used by the United States High Commissioner to the Philippines and his staff from 1935 to 1940. In 1942, during the World War II Japanese occupation of the Philippines, Japanese forces took almost 100 residents from the Elks Club and the adjacent Army and Navy Club to the Santo Tomas Internment Camp. The Elks Club building was left in ruins and was eventually destroyed during the war.

In February 1949, the Elks Lodge #761 opened its newly rebuilt Manila Elks Club Building on the site of the first, on the renamed Dewey Boulevard. The two-story Mission Revival style clubhouse was designed by William E. Parsons, an American architect who had trained at Yale University and École des Beaux-Arts in Paris. In the 1960s, because of issues of foreign ownership of the property, the Elks Lodge #761 moved out of the Manila Elks Club Building to a new facility in the Flag Village area of Makati.

Later, the Manila Elks Club Building was acquired by the Philippine government. The building and its grounds, along the renamed Roxas Boulevard, now houses the Museo Pambata or the children's museum. The museum was founded by Dr. Estefania Aldaba-Lim in 1994.

== See also ==
- History of the Philippines (1898–1946)
- List of Elks buildings
