= Elyria Elks Club =

- U.S. National Register of Historic Places
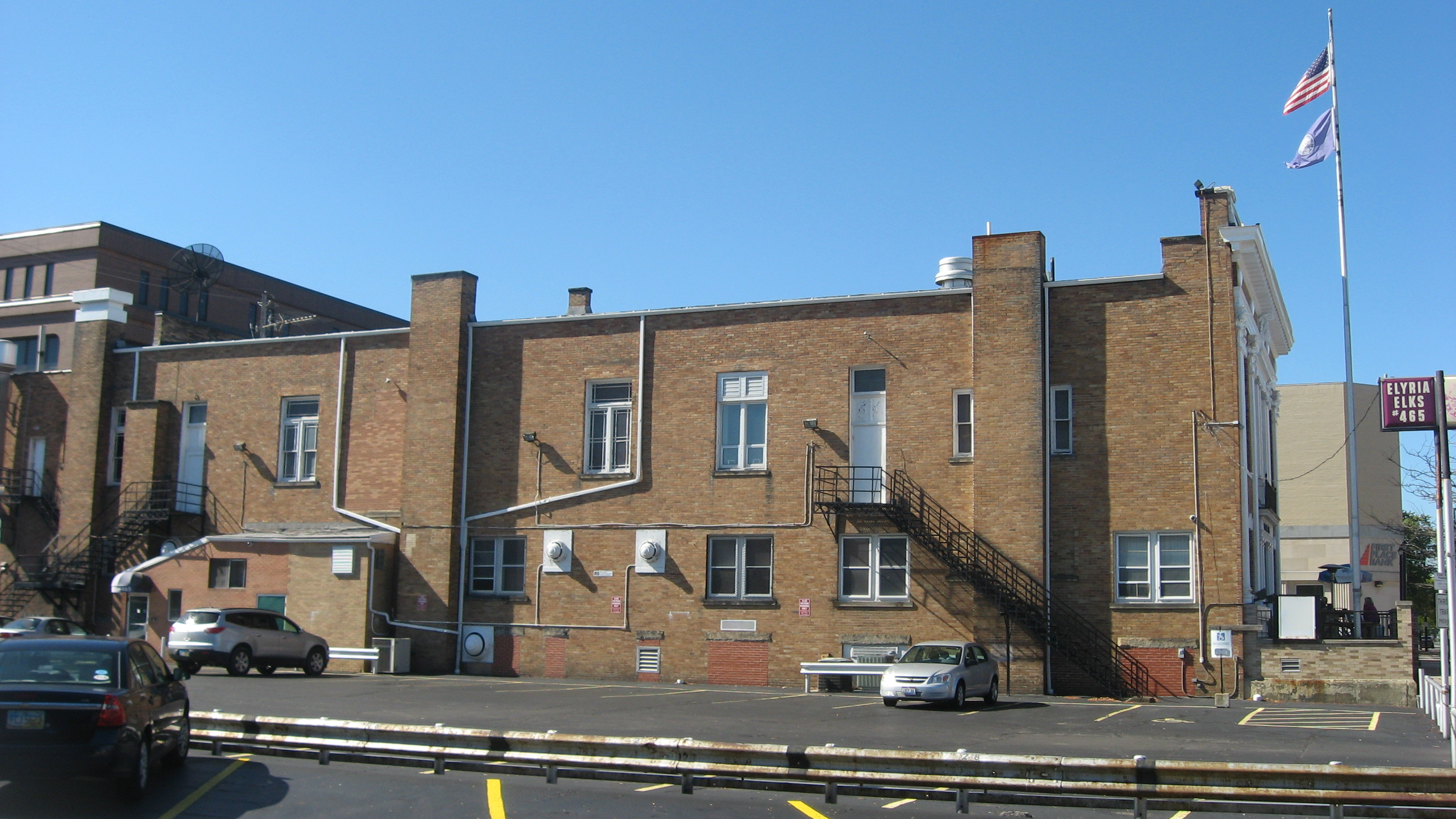
- Eastern side of the building

- Location within Ohio Location within the United States
- Location: 246 2nd St., Elyria, Ohio
- Coordinates: 41°21′58″N 82°6′23″W
- Area: less than one acre
- Architectural style: Renaissance
- MPS: Elyria MRA
- NRHP reference No.: 79002726
- Added to NRHP: August 13, 1979

The Elyria Elks Club, in Elyria, Ohio, has served as a clubhouse of the Elks social fraternity. It was listed on the National Register of Historic Places in 1979.

The Elyria Elks Club makes extraordinary use of classical motifs. Two-story Corinthian pilasters support a richly detailed entablature that is highlighted by medal-lions. Above the entrance are a balcony and a set of windows enframed by Ionic pilasters and an entablature. On the interior, the second floor houses a large meeting hall. Notable chiefly for its architectural styles, this Renaissance Revival building was constructed in the early 1900s. The Elks occupied downtown buildings for some time before this building was constructed entirely for their own use. The brick walls rest upon a stone foundation and the entire structure is covered by a flat composition roof.
