= Litchfield Elks Lodge No. 654 =

- U.S. National Register of Historic Places
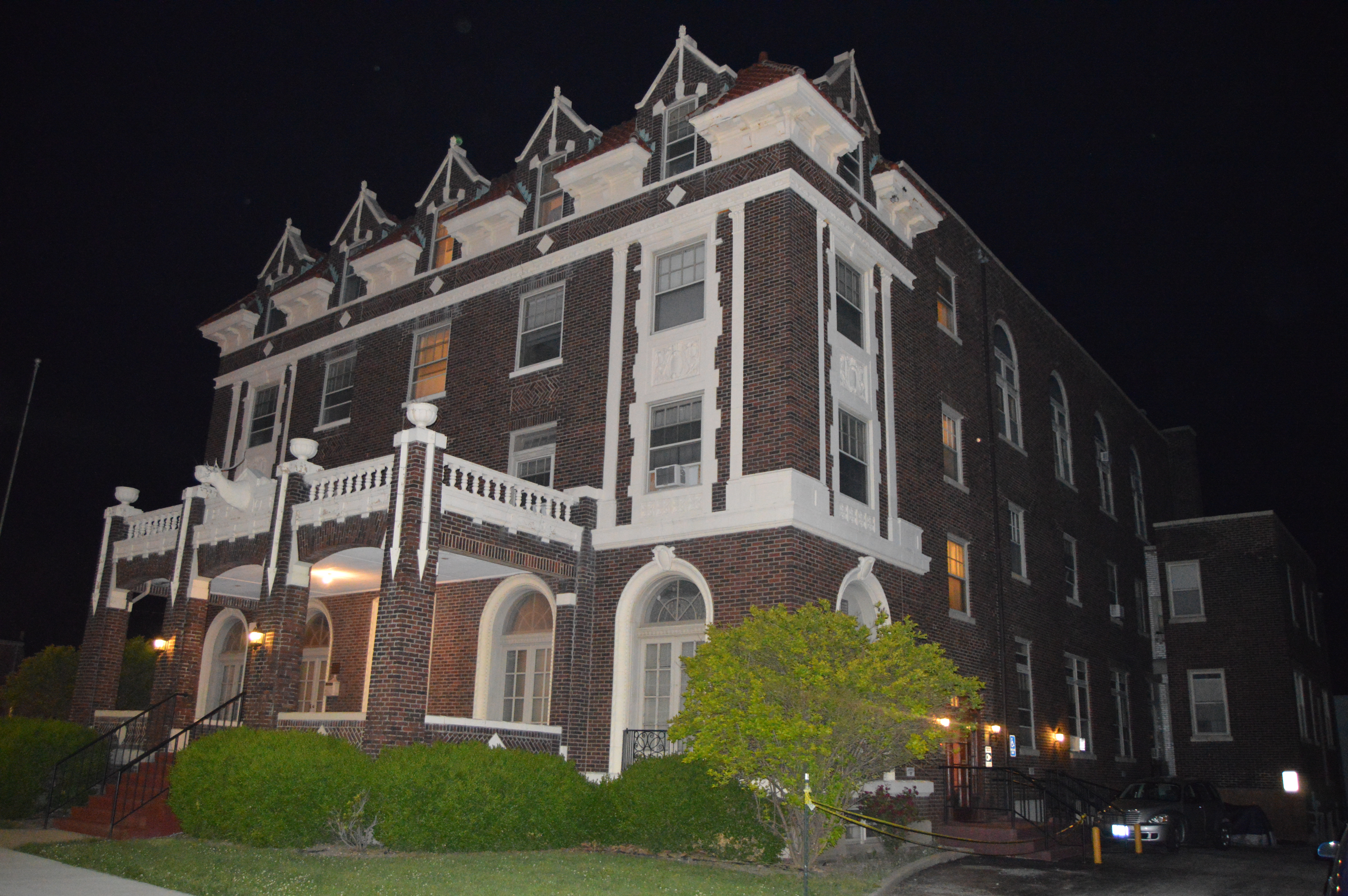
- Front and southern side

- Location within Illinois Location within the United States
- Location: 424 N. Monroe St., Litchfield, Illinois
- Coordinates: 39°10′40″N 89°39′14″W
- Area: less than one acre
- Built: 1923
- Architect: Stiegemeyer, Oliver W.
- Architectural style: Classical Revival
- NRHP reference No.: 95000195
- Added to NRHP: March 3, 1995

The Litchfield Elks Lodge No. 654, also known as Elks Club, is an Elks building located at 424 N. Monroe St. in Litchfield, Illinois. The building was constructed in 1923 for Litchfield's Elks lodge, which formed in 1901. Architect Oliver W. Stiegemeyer designed the building in a Classical Revival plan with a significant Beaux-Arts influence, particularly in its form. The main section of the front facade has five bays and features terra cotta pilasters along the corner bays. The building's front porch, which projects from the three center bays, has a balustrade supported by three arches and decorated with terra cotta. The red tile mansard roof has five dormers and a bracketed cornice along the bottom.

The building was listed on the National Register of Historic Places in 1995.
