= Naval Lodge Elks Building =

- U.S. National Register of Historic Places
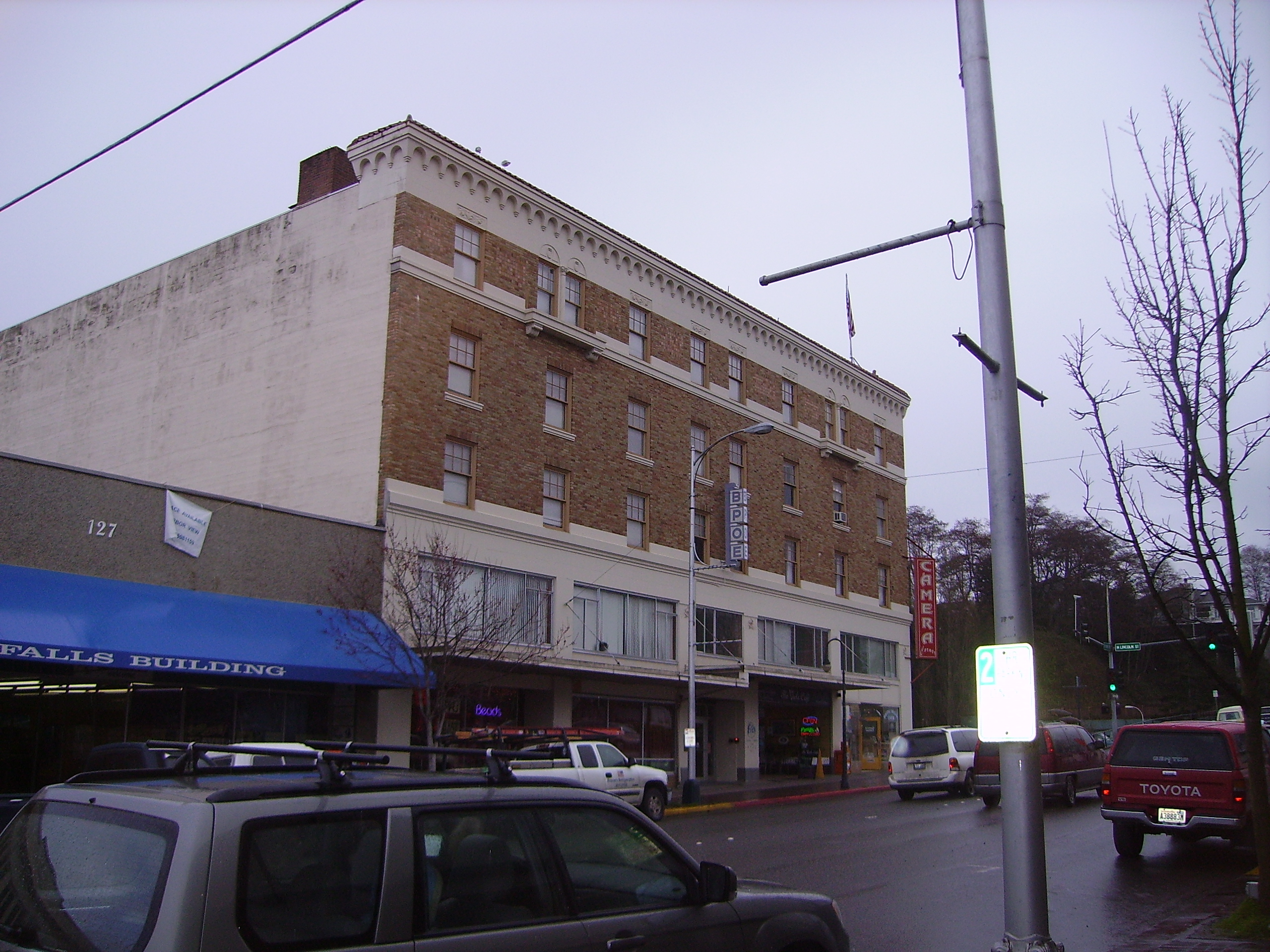
- Naval Lodge No. 353 of the Benevolent Protective Order of the Elks

- Location within Washington (state)
- Location: 131 East First Street, Port Angeles, Washington
- Coordinates: 48°07′07″N 123°25′55″W
- Area: less than one acre
- Built: 1927
- Architect: J. Charles Stanley; S. S. Mullins
- Architectural style: Late 19th and 20th Century Revivals, Renaissance Revival
- NRHP reference No.: 86000956
- Added to NRHP: May 2, 1986

The Naval Lodge Elks Building, also known as Naval Lodge No. 353 BPOE Temple is a historic building located at 131 East First Street, Port Angeles, Washington. It was first envisioned on September 28, 1896 when the city leaders of Port Angeles, Washington met with members of the Navy to found Naval Lodge No. 353 of the Benevolent and Protective Order of Elks. The lodge also received special approval from the national Grand Lodge of Elks to become the only Elks Lodge in the country whose name was not based on its location. The lodge was built in 1927 following designs by architect J. Charles Stanley. When dedicated in 1928, the building was the largest fraternal lodge in the city. It is still used today as an Elks Lodge.

It was listed on the National Register of Historic Places in 1986.
