= Elks Lodge Building (Flint, Michigan) =

- U.S. National Register of Historic Places
- Michigan State Historic Site
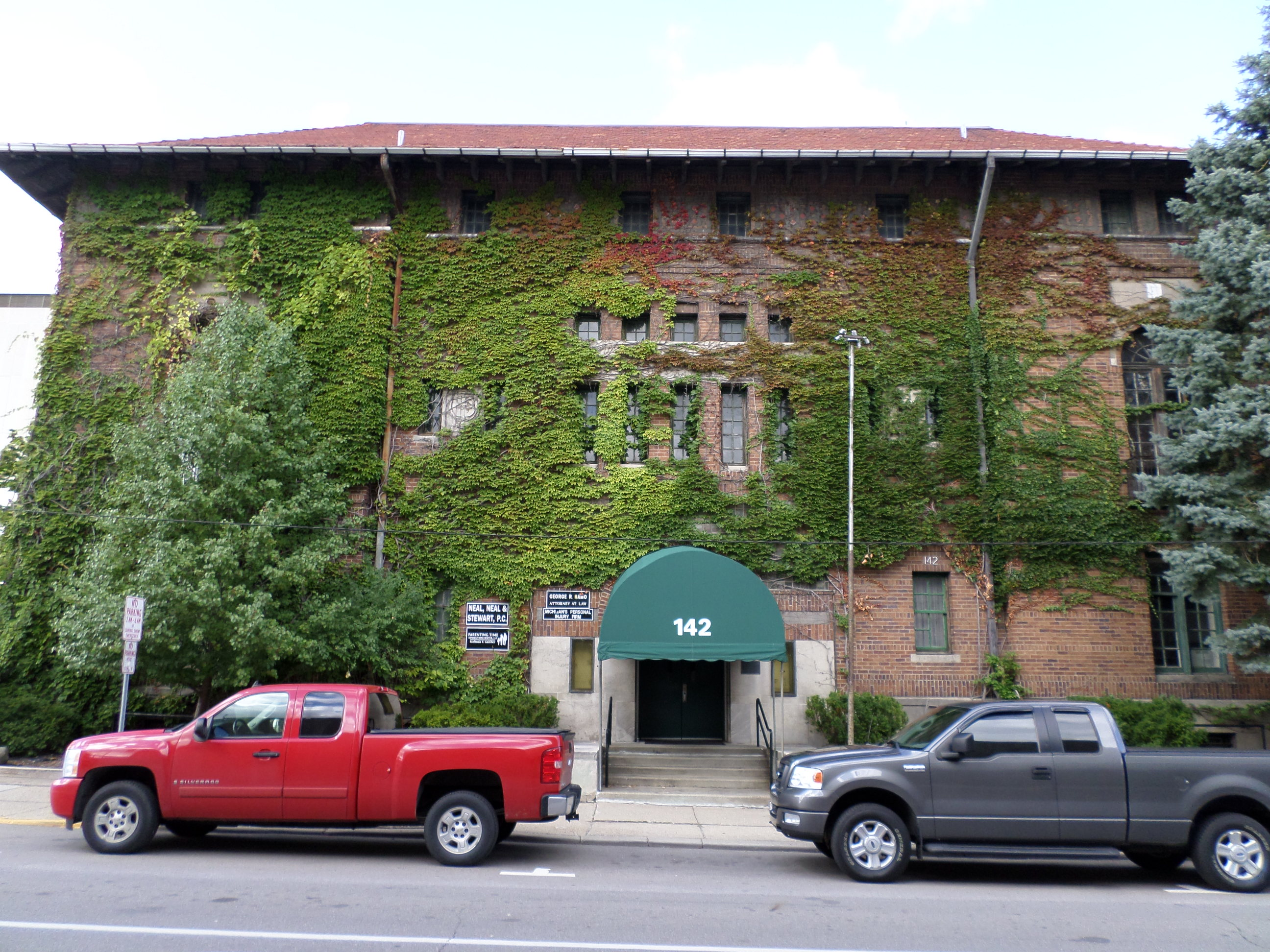
- The Elks Lodge Building, September 2014

- Location within Michigan Location within the United States
- Interactive map
- Location: 142 W. 2nd St., Flint, Michigan
- Coordinates: 43°0′50″N 83°41′28″W
- Area: less than one acre
- Built: 1913
- Built by: H.V. Snyder & Son
- Architect: Malcomson and Higginbotham
- Architectural style: Late 19th and 20th Century Revivals, Second Renaissance Revival
- NRHP reference No.: 78001497

Significant dates
- Added to NRHP: October 4, 1978
- Designated MSHS: November 3, 1976

The Elks Lodge Building in Flint, Michigan, also known as Old Elks Building, was built in 1913. It was listed on the National Register of Historic Places in 1978.

== History ==
Elks Lodge 222 was organized in Flint in 1891. They first met in a block of rooms in the Ward - Building in downtown Flint, and in 1900 moved to larger quarters in the Judd Block. At that time there were 28 members of the Lodge, but membership quickly expanded, and in 1902 the Elks moved into a floor in the newly completed Dryden Building. However, by 1912, membership had increased to over 1000 people, and the Lodge was forced to look for a larger and more appropriate home. The Lodge began a fund-raising campaign under the leadership of founder William C. Durant, and in 1913 purchased the lot on which this building sits. They hired the Detroit firm of Malcomson and Higginbotham to design a new building, and the Battle Creek firm of H.V. Snyder & Son to construct it. The building opened in March 1914.

Early members of the Elks Lodge 222 included not only William C. Durant, but his partner J. Dallas Dort, Walter P. Chrysler, Buick president Harry Basset and founder William S. Ballenger Sr., Charles Barth, Doc Treat, Charles W. Nash, and Charles Stewart Mott. According to Edward Soloman, head of a history committee for the Flint Elks Lodge 222, at one time "Back then, everyone who was anyone was part of the [Elks] club." However, the club experienced a slow decline in membership, and by the early 1970s it had decreased significantly. The club voted in 1971 to sell the lodge building, and it moved to its current location in Grand Blanc on East Maple Avenue.

The building was available for sale in 2015, listed at $375,000.

== Description ==
The Flint Elks Club is a two and a half story brick structure, three bays wide, with a hip roof covered in glazed tile. The building is of a simplified Second Renaissance Revival design. On the first floor, the main entryway is in the center bay, with the door planked by a smooth facing of limestone and topped by a spandrel of glazed earth-toned tiles. Small four-over-four double-hung sash windows are on each side of the doorway, and twin four-over-six double hung sash windows are in the bays to either side. The second story level is greater in height than the first, and has twin tall rounded-arch windows in the side bays. Five narrow windows are in the center bay. The third story is shorter, and contains a decorative frieze accents the front facade which wraps around to the side.
