= Elks Lodge Building (Oklahoma City) =

- U.S. National Register of Historic Places
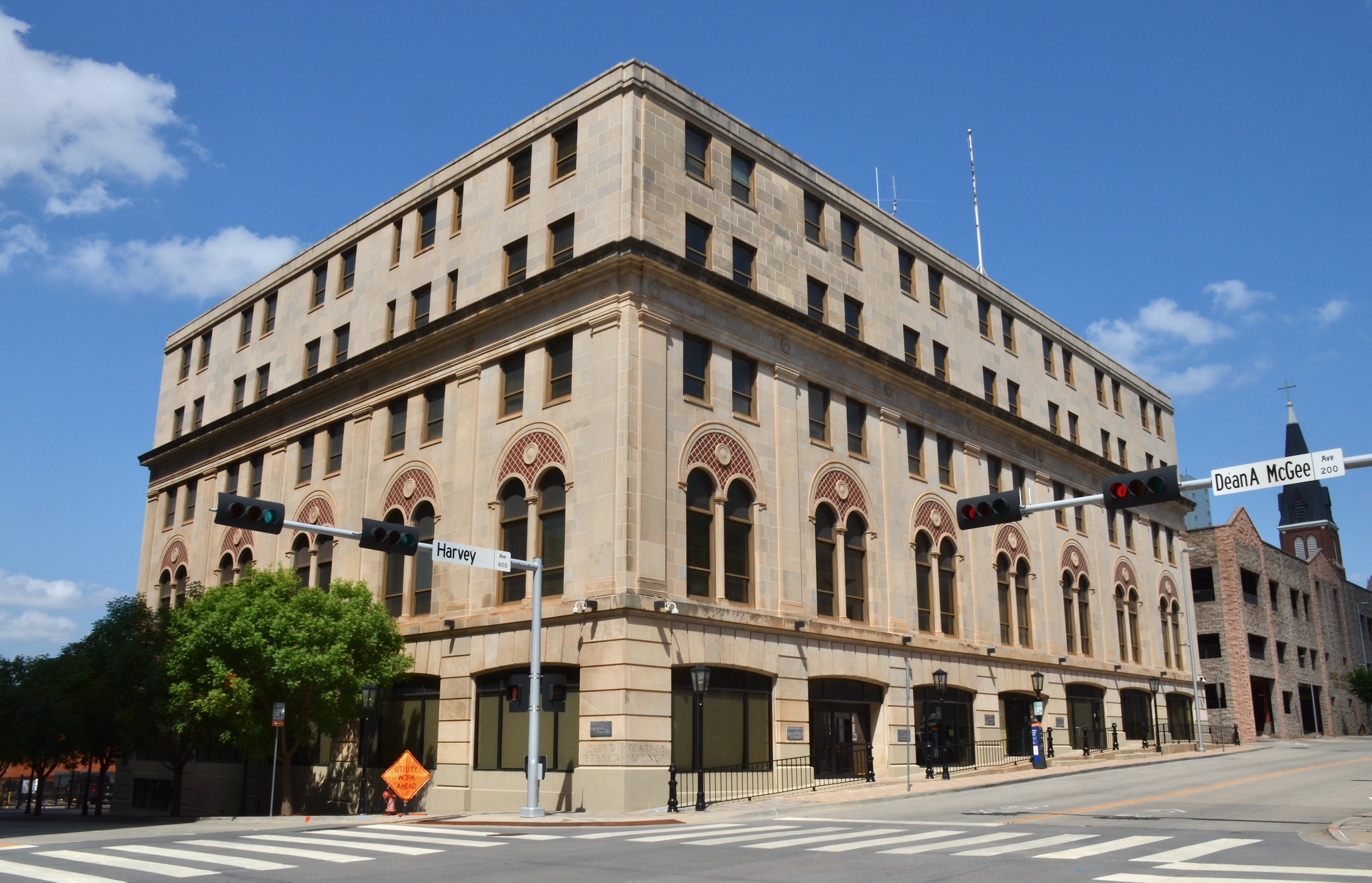
- Viewed from the southeast in 2021

- Location within Oklahoma Location within the United States
- Location: 401 N. Harvey St., Oklahoma City, Oklahoma
- Coordinates: 35°28′16″N 97°31′10″W
- Area: 1 acre (0.40 ha)
- Built: 1926
- Architect: Sorey, Hill & Sorey
- Architectural style: Renaissance, Italian Renaissance
- NRHP reference No.: 80003284
- Added to NRHP: March 10, 1980

The Elks Lodge Building in Oklahoma City, Oklahoma, also known as the ONG Building, is significant as an architectural oddity, and for the association of its three successive owners in the history of the state. It is Italian Renaissance-style building that was built in 1926. It was listed on the National Register of Historic Places in 1980.

It was designed to be 12 stories but construction was stopped when it was at five stories, when funds ran out. Financing, in prosperous year of 1925, had seemed solid with $500,000 pledged, but owners and architect agreed to finish it off at five floors, despite the architrave between third and fourth floors looking out of place. The Elks "prospered" in the building for five years, then the Great Depression hit and, in 1932, the Elks sold the building.

Up to 1979, the three owners were the Elks Lodge of Oklahoma City, then General William S. Key, then the Oklahoma Natural Gas Company.
