= Elks Building (Stockton, California) =

- U.S. National Register of Historic Places
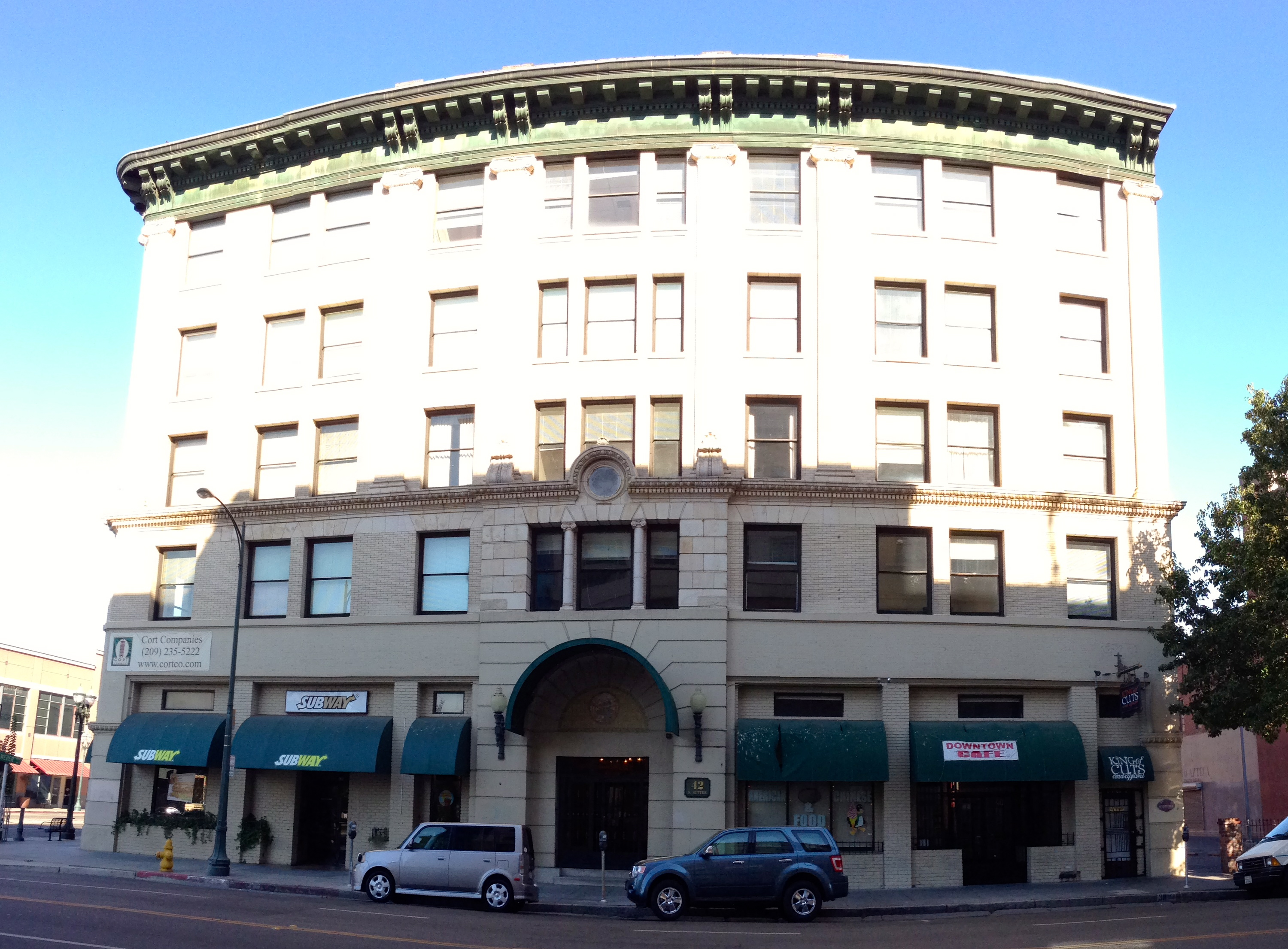

- Location within California Location within the United States
- Location: 42 N. Sutter St., Stockton, California
- Coordinates: 37°57′48″N 121°17′5″W
- Area: 0.2 acres (0.081 ha)
- Built: 1906-08
- Architect: Salfield & Kohlberg
- Architectural style: Chicago, Commercial Style
- NRHP reference No.: 80004606
- Added to NRHP: June 3, 1980

The Elks Building in Stockton, California is a 5-story U-shaped Chicago style/Commercial Style building built during 1906–08. Located at the corner of Sutter and Weber Streets, it has a copper cornice over those two streets.

It is unusual, structurally, due to reports from the 1906 San Francisco earthquake about which types of buildings survived earthquake and fire. Ergo it is built from steel and concrete on the first two floors, although from there up has timber framing with two-foot thick brick masonry exterior walls. A March 1906 newspaper report had stated the building was expected to be built from brick masonry; a May 1906 newspaper report said its construction would change.

It was listed on the National Register of Historic Places in 1980.
