= Elks Temple (Boise, Idaho) =

- U.S. National Register of Historic Places
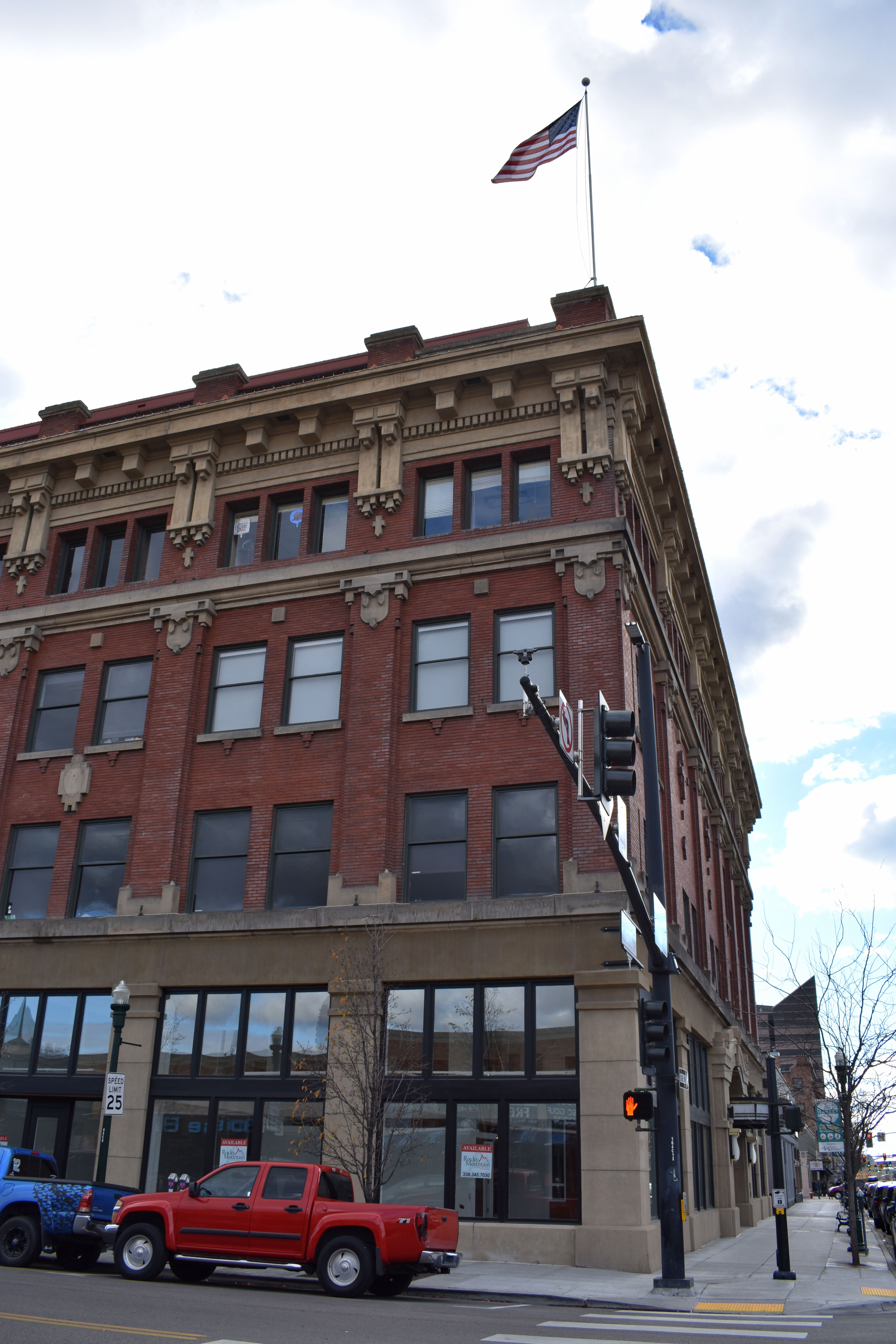
- Site of the Elks Temple

- Location within Idaho Location within the United States
- Location: 350 Jefferson St., Boise, Idaho
- Coordinates: 43°37′6″N 116°12′5″W
- Area: less than one acre
- Built: 1913-14, 1923-24
- Architect: Tourtellotte & Hummel
- Architectural style: Italian Palazzo Style
- NRHP reference No.: 78001032
- Added to NRHP: February 17, 1978

The Elks Temple in Boise, Idaho was built during 1913-1914 and expanded during 1923–34. It is a four-story, five-bay building in "Italian Palazzo Style". It has served as a clubhouse of the Benevolent and Protective Order of Elks organization. It was listed on the National Register of Historic Places in 1978.

It was designed by Tourtellotte & Hummel and has an unusual cornice, plus an elk head on its front facade with light bulbs at the antler tips (elk head was removed when the Boise Elk's relocated to a new temple); it is a Boise landmark, and according to its NRHP nomination is "one of the city's better buildings from the pre-World War I period." Its interior was heavily damaged in a 1943 fire.

== Architecture ==
The exterior was described by the Sunday Capital News as "...a modern adaptation of the Renaissance. The first story is treated with a modern store front over which is a wide frieze and sill courses of stone. The second and third stories are divided into large panels by wide pilasters of brick with stone caps and bases. over these pilasters forming the sills of the fourth story windows is a heavy moulded band of stone. The top of the building is finished with a wide overhanging cornice in the Renaissance style, supported by large brackets and modillions. The parapet wall of the building above the cornice consists of heavy brick piers with panels of brick and wrought iron balustrades between. The two street elevations are faced with dark red pressed brick and light gray Boise sandstone."

== See also ==
- Benevolent and Protective Order of Elks
- Downtown Boise
