= Elks Club Building (Tyler, Texas) =

- U.S. National Register of Historic Places
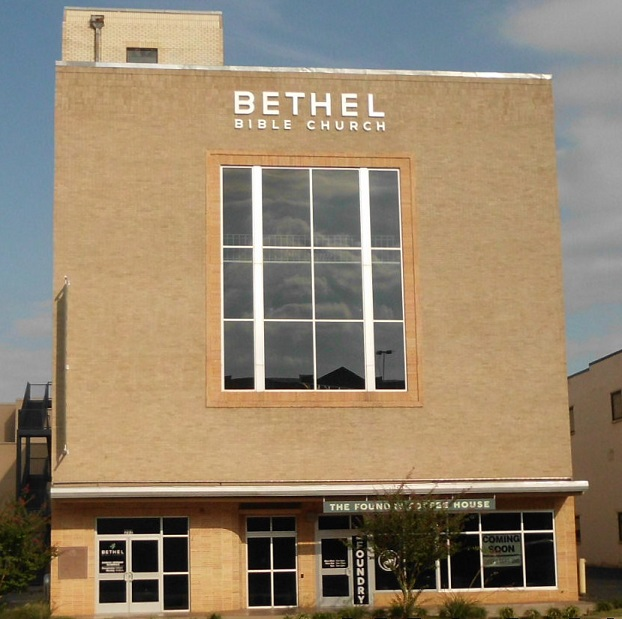
- Elks Club Building in 2014

- Location within Texas Location within the United States
- Location: 202 S. Broadway, Tyler, Texas
- Coordinates: 32°20′56″N 95°18′0″W
- Area: 0.2 acres (0.081 ha)
- Built: 1949
- Built by: Hugh E. White
- Architect: Carl A. Gregory
- Architectural style: International Style
- MPS: Tyler, Texas MPS
- NRHP reference No.: 02000648
- Added to NRHP: June 14, 2002

The Elks Club Building in Tyler, Texas is an International Style building built in 1949. It was listed on the National Register of Historic Places in 2002.

== History ==
It is a three-story, two-part commercial block designed by Tyler architect Carl A. Gregory (1903–1976) and constructed by Tyler contractor Hugh E. White. The local Benevolent and Protective Order of Elks club used its second and third floors for offices, dining room and ballroom, and let out the first-floor retail space, until the club sold the building in 1973 and moved elsewhere.

Its NRHP nomination describes its International Style elements as including its volumetric massing, its flat roof, and its "sheer, virtually unadorned exterior walls and a subtlety articulated entry". The nomination states that it "recalls the early 20th century design theories of American architect Louis Sullivan in the sheer primary facade wall embellished with a large, centrally placed window that is the building's focal point."

The building was rehabilitated during 1997–2001 with care to preserve its historic character.

The Blackstone Building, at 315 N. Building in Tyler, is another work of Hugh E. White, and is also NRHP-listed.

== See also ==
- National Register of Historic Places listings in Smith County, Texas
