= Elks Building (Vancouver, Washington) =

- U.S. National Register of Historic Places
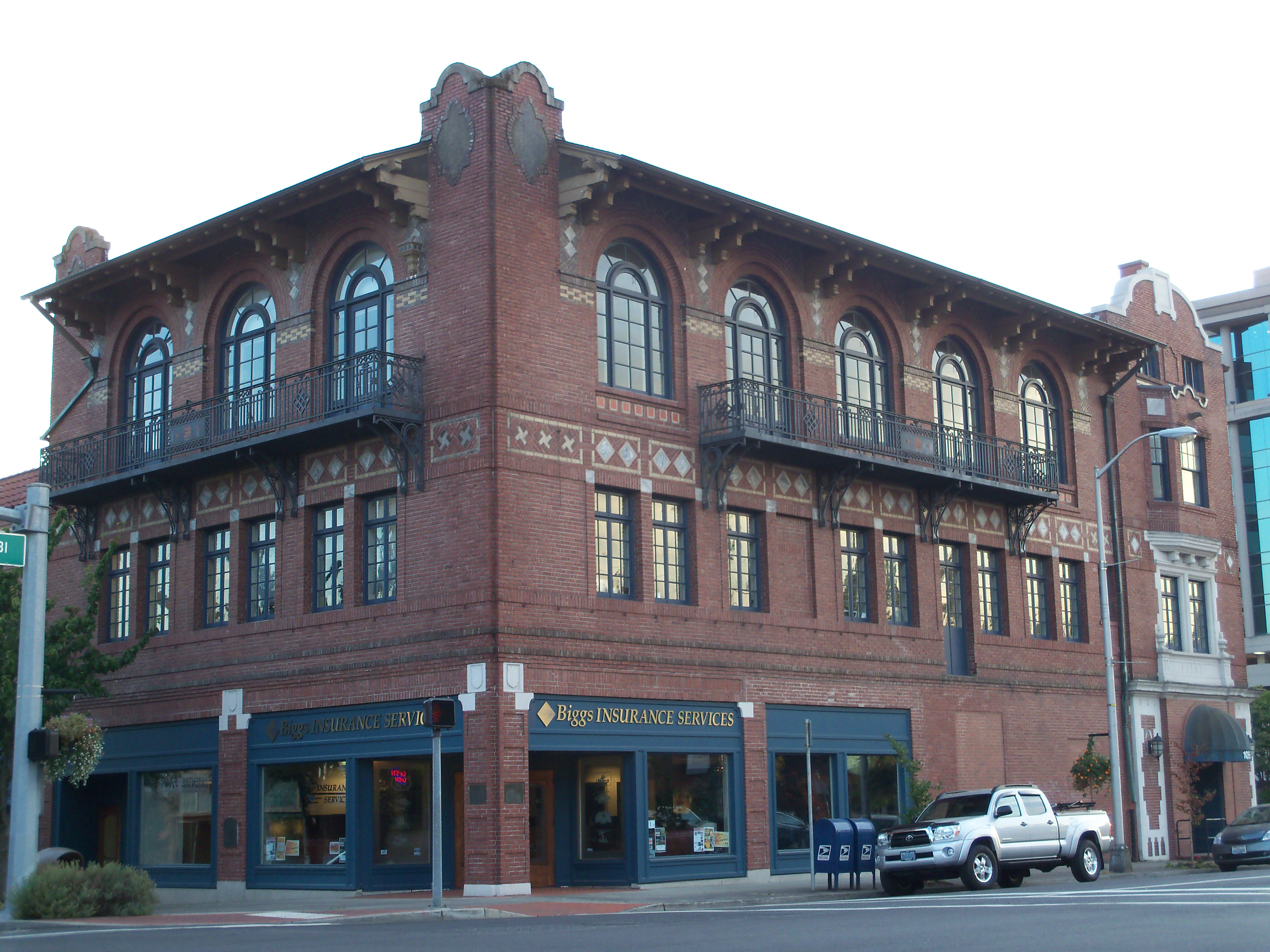

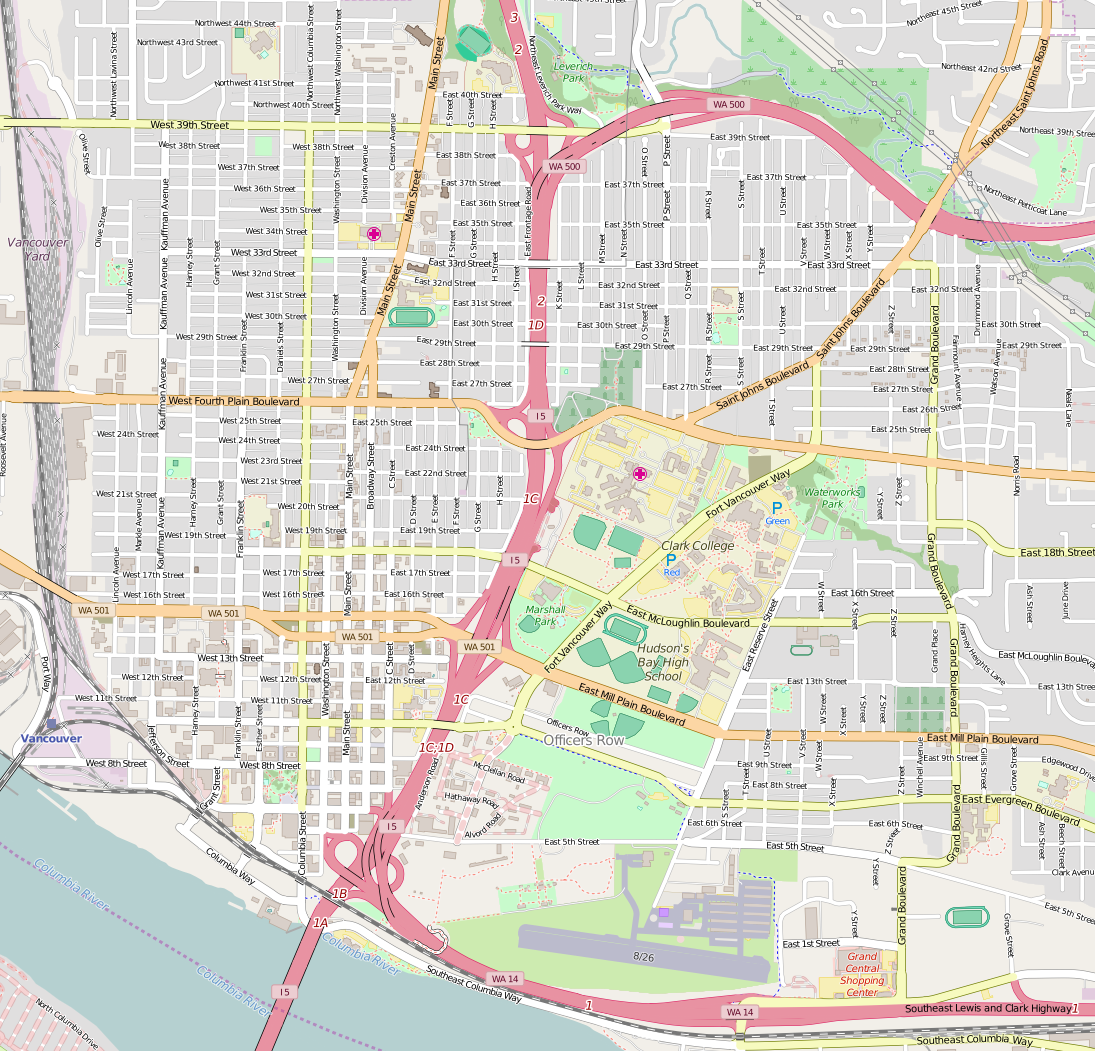
- Location within Vancouver Washington
- Location: 916 Main Street, Vancouver, Washington
- Coordinates: 45°37′43″N 122°40′19″W
- Area: less than one acre
- Built: 1911
- Architect: Robert F. Tegan
- Architectural style: Late 19th and 20th Century Revivals
- NRHP reference No.: 83003322
- Added to NRHP: July 14, 1983

The Elks Building in Vancouver, Washington was built in 1911. It was listed on the National Register of Historic Places in 1983.

It was designed by Portland architect Robert F. Tegan.

The local Elks club was for many years the most prestigious fraternal organization in Vancouver. Eventually, the Rotary Club overtook it.
