= Sand Man (tugboat) =

Tugboat built in 1910

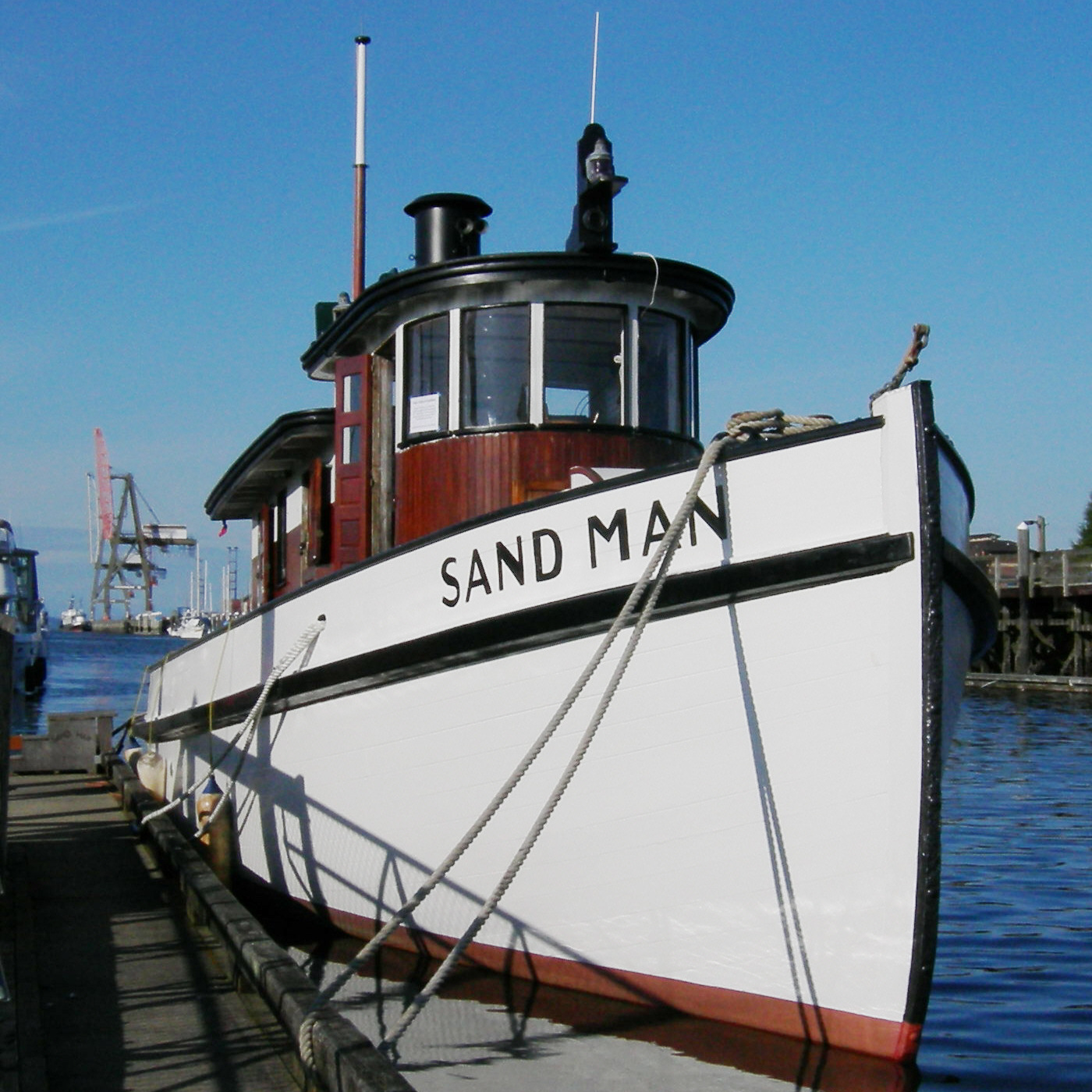
- Sand Man tugboat in 2007

History
- Namesake: Moving sand barges
- Owner: Port of Olympia
- Builder: Crawford and Reid in Tacoma, Washington
- Completed: 1910
- Nickname(s): Olympia’s Tugboat
- Status: Museum ship at Swantown Marina, Olympia, Washington

General characteristics
- Type: Tugboat
- Tonnage: 37 tons full
- Displacement: 28 Gross tons
- Length: 58.5 feet (17.8 m)
- Beam: 14.5 ft (4.4 m)
- Height: 21.5 feet (6.6 m)
- Draft: 6.4 ft (2.0 m)
- Propulsion: Current: Caterpillar D 13000, 6 cylinder 110 hp diesel engine

- Sand Man (tugboat)
- U.S. National Register of Historic Places
- U.S. National Historic Landmark
- Location: Percival Landing (Note: At the time of the NRHP nomination, the Sand Man was located at Percival Landing. By 2026, the tugboat had been moved to drydock at Swantown Marina at the Port of Olympia. See sources throughout the article.)
- Coordinates: 47°02′44″N 122°54′18″W
- Area: Olympia, Washington
- Built: 1910, Tacoma, Washington
- Architect: Crawford and Reid
- Architectural style: Sawn old-growth Douglas fir, plank on frame
- NRHP reference No.: 98001018
- Added to NRHP: August 6, 1998

Sand Man, also as Sandman, (Note: The tugboat's name is spelled either as Sand Man or Sandman depending on the source. See references throughout the article for the discrepancy.) is a historic tugboat museum ship docked at Percival Landing, Olympia, Washington. The vessel was added to the National Register of Historic Places in 1998.

== History ==
The tugboat was built in 1910 by Crawford and Reid in Tacoma, Washington from old-growth Douglas fir and measures 58.5 feet (17.8 m) in length and 21.5 feet (6.6 m) in height.

The ship was originally used to transport sand and gravel scows throughout the Puget Sound during its first 15 years of service.

From 1910 to 1987 Sand Man operated as a commercial tugboat and towboat in Puget Sound. Its home port was Olympia, Washington. In 1974, Sand Man ran the first race in Olympia's annual Labor Day tugboat races held at the inaugural Olympia Harbor Days Festival.

The boat sank twice, once in 1998 from a rotting hull, and again on its way for reconstruction at Port Townsend. Over the next several years, approximately $500,000 (equivalent to $824,246 in 2025) was spent on repairs to the hull, deck and cabins.

=== 21st century ===
The hull restoration was completed in 2000 by PT Shipwrights Co-op, in Port Townsend, Washington. The cabins and engine restoration was completed in 2005 by Paul Deranleau and his crew of volunteers in Olympia, after being out of the water for 7 years for work at Swantown Marina. Sand Man originally it had copper sheathing to protect the hull, later this was replaced with ironbark wood sheathing. The ship, at the time, still contained the original Stanley Steamer engine used for the towing winch that is run by compressed air. Only a few of this type of tug remain.

Under preservation and ownership by the non-profit Sandman Foundation, the boat was listed in July 2025 as impounded and up for auction at a starting bid of $10,000, to satisfy a rental and docking debt of $28,966 incurred by the foundation; no bids were received. The boat was considered to be in a "structurally compromised" condition due to dry docking since May 2023, posing a safety risk. As of 2026, the Sand Man has been moored at Swantown Marina at the Port of Olympia.

The vessel was deemed as having "surpassed the point" of repairs due to the financial cost. Preservation options were presented, including salvaging artifacts and parts of the tugboat for historical displays at local businesses, museums, and parks. In July 2026, the port authority, along with preservation partners, began removing and inventorying items and materials. The post also began an application process under the Sand Man Artifact Review Committee that allows removed items and materials from the Sandman to be placed with approved institutions and organizations that are able to preserve and display the artifacts. (Note: The 2026 preservation distribution of artifacts mandated that only one item could be placed per organization.) Items available for distribution include various fixtures, mechanical gear, such as a propeller and winch, name boards, and exhaust and vent stacks. Additional artifacts include navigation equipment and sailing components, such as masts, safety gear, and other deck items.

== Ownership ==
- 1910 – 1925 Arthur J. Weston, owner of Olympia Sand & Gravel Company. used to tow barges of sand and gravel, thus the ships name.
- 1925 – 1955 Delta V. Smyth (a local lumberman) who owned of Delta Smyth Tug & Barge Company.
- 1955 – 1964 Fred Chadwick who owned Capitol City Towing Company.
- 1964 – 1987 Franz Schlottmann who owned Schlottmann Excavating & Towing
- 1987 – 1997 Bob Powell; donated the ship to The Sand Man Foundation for $10.
- 1997 – 2023 The Sand Man Foundation

The Sand Man Foundation was listed as defunct after 2023 and the tugboat lacked any official owner for a brief time. Proprietorship was transferred to the Port of Olympia prior to July 2025.

== Ship details ==
The ship's wheel-house was designed and built by the Long family of Olympia. Jake Frisch built the doors and windows in 1910.

Engines used on Sand Man include:

- 1910 – 1922 Frisco Standard, 3 cylinder 50 hp gasoline engine, built in San Francisco by Standard Gas Engine
- 1922 – 1944 Fairbanks-Morse, 3 cylinder 100 hp diesel engine
- 1944 – present Caterpillar D 13000, 6 cylinder 110 hp diesel engine
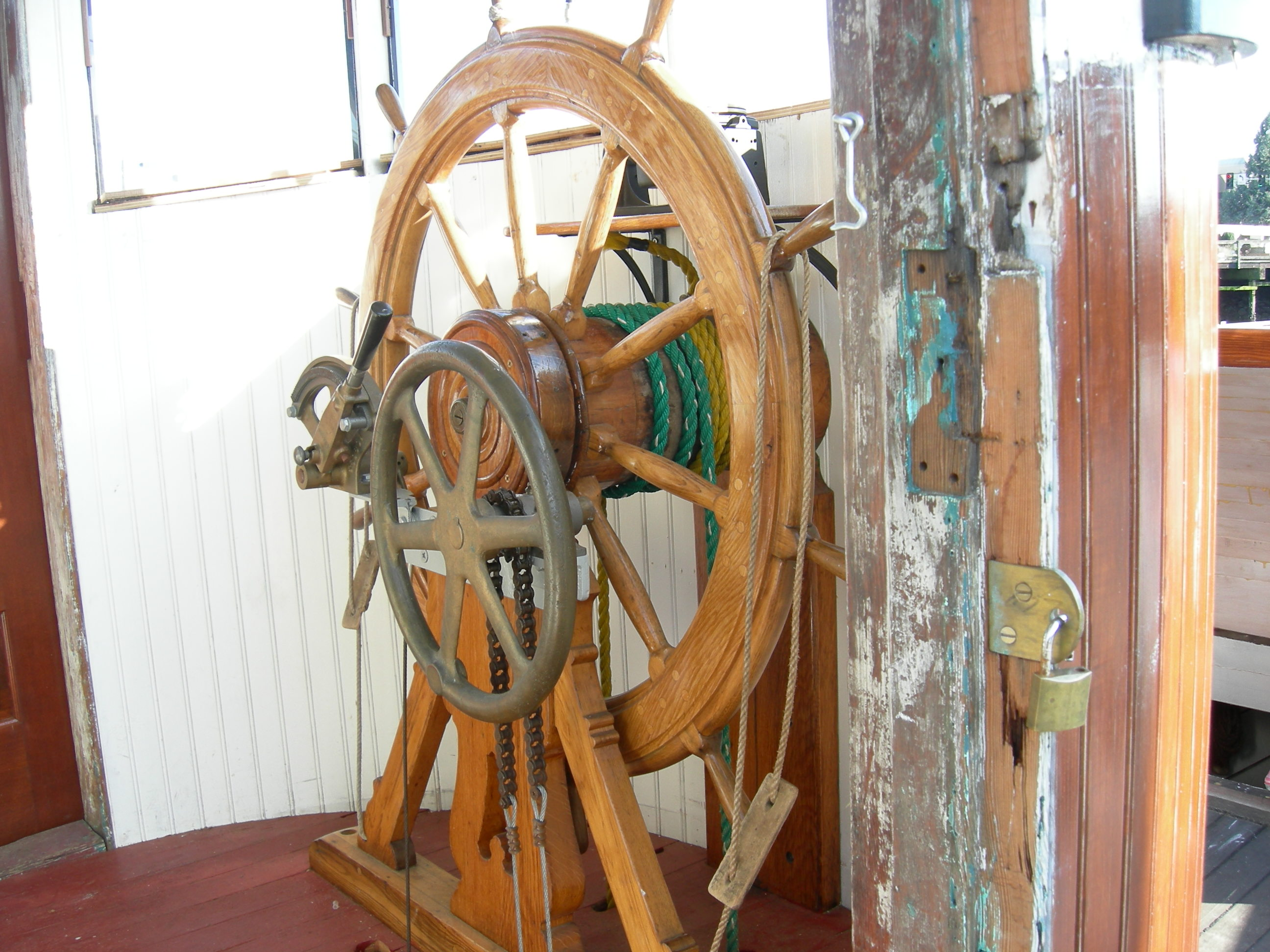
Sand Man wheel

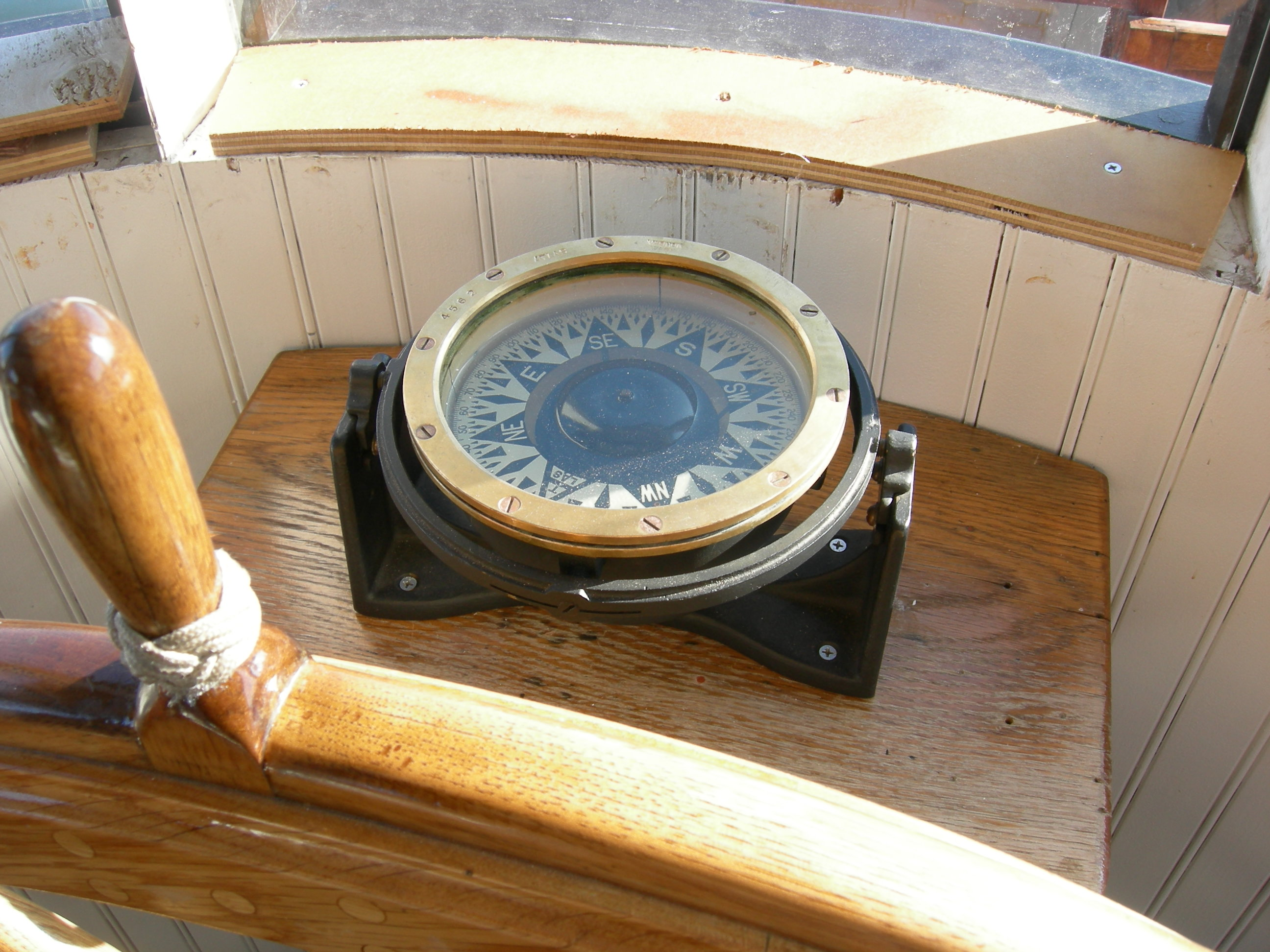
Sand Man compass

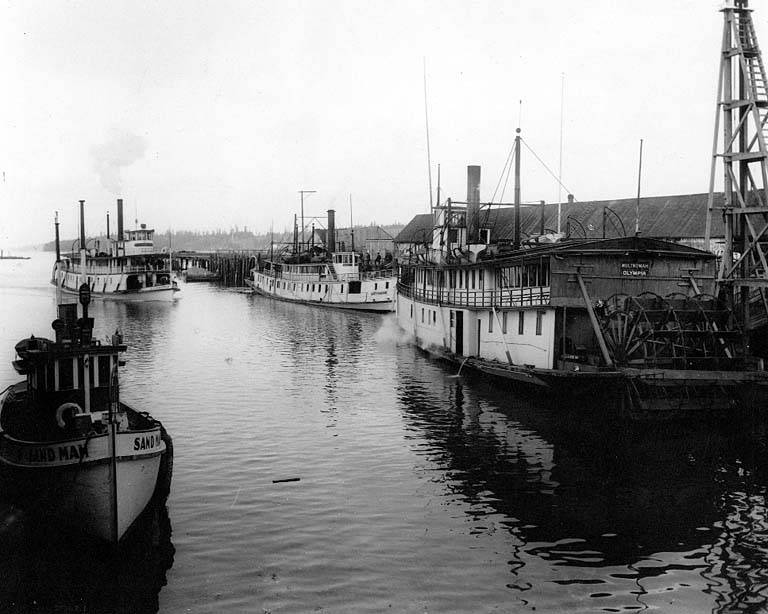
Olympia, Washington in 1911, Sand Man in foreground with S.G. Simpson, SS Multnomah and SS Greyhound

== Significance ==
On August 6, 1998, Sand Man was listed on the National Register of Historic Places. She is also listed on the Washington State Heritage Register and Olympia Heritage Register.

== See also ==
Media related to Sand Man (tugboat, 1910) at Wikimedia Commons

- List of museum ships in North America
- Angels Gate (tugboat)
- National Register of Historic Places listings in Thurston County, Washington
