= Capital Pride =

Capital Pride as the name of an LGBT (lesbian, gay, bisexual, transgender) pride event may refer to:

- Capital Pride (Albany, NY)
- Capital Pride (Ottawa), Canada
- Capital Pride (Washington, D.C.)

Pride events with similar names:

- Capital City Pride in Olympia, Washington
- Salem Capital Pride in Salem, Oregon
