= Percival Landing Park =

Public park in Olympia, Washington

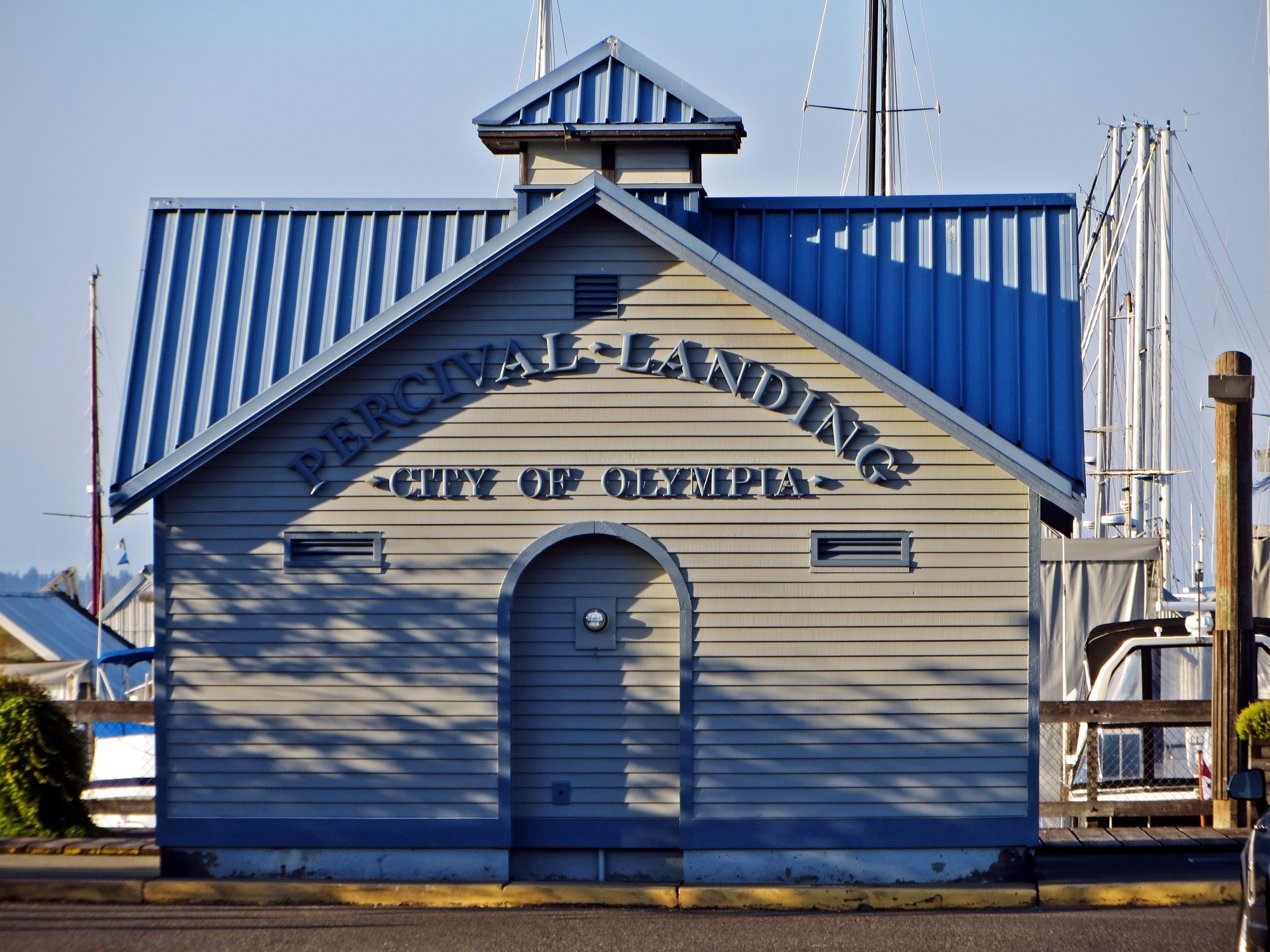
- Percival Landing Park, 2012
- Interactive map of Park location
- Type: Municipal
- Location: 405 Columbia St NW, Olympia, Washington
- Coordinates: 47°02′48″N 122°54′15″W
- Area: 3.38 acres (13,700 m^{2})
- Opened: 1977
- Etymology: Sam Percival
- Owner: City of Olympia
- Status: Open
- Hiking trails: Boardwalk, 0.9 miles (1.4 km)
- Habitats: Waterfront
- Water: Budd Inlet
- Collections: Public art
- Parking: Parking lot
- Events: Harbor Days, Wooden Boat festivals
- Facilities: Picnic and playground areas, bathrooms, moorage
- Website: Official City Website

Percival Landing Park is a public park in Olympia, Washington, located on the southern most tip of Puget Sound.

== History ==
Named after a former commercial steamship wharf, the park is a well-known maritime landmark in the Pacific Northwest. Built in 1860 by the park's namesake, Sam Percival, the wharf operated for several decades, and was torn down and replaced several times during that period.

Completed in three phases, the first efforts at Percival Landing Park were completed and opened in 1977, (Note: Sourcing mentions the first phase may not have been completed until 1978.) with the second phase opened in 1985, and the third phase in 1988.

The former Unocal Tank Farm site was acquired by the City of Olympia in 1996, and is now an open lawn.

In November 2009, the park underwent structural repairs and was intermittently closed. The city also installed two pavilions in 2010, replaced 700 feet (210 m) of deteriorating boardwalk in 2011 and installed a new bulkhead in 2019. As of 2022, additional repairs were in consideration.

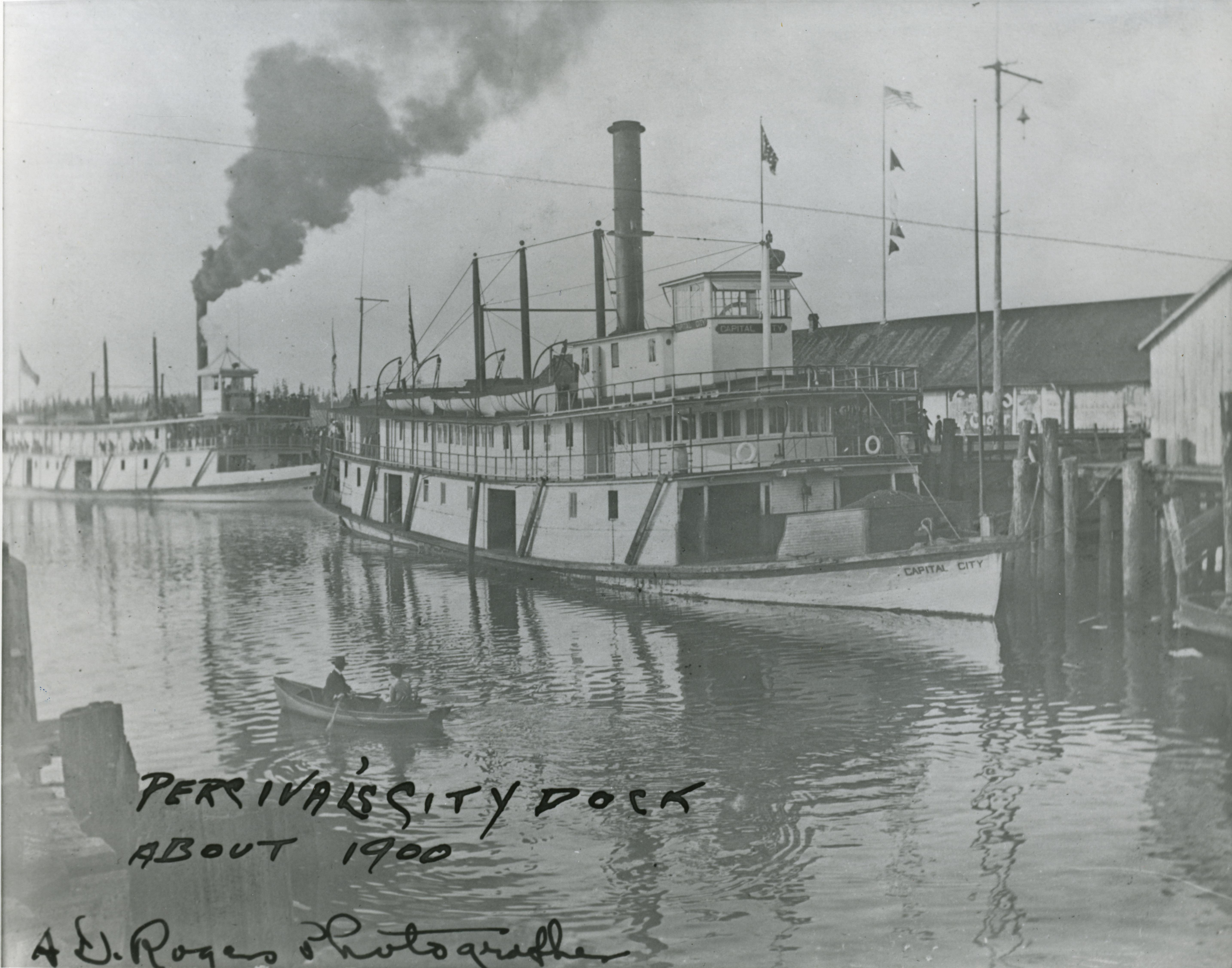
Percival Dock with "Capital City" steamboat, c. 1900

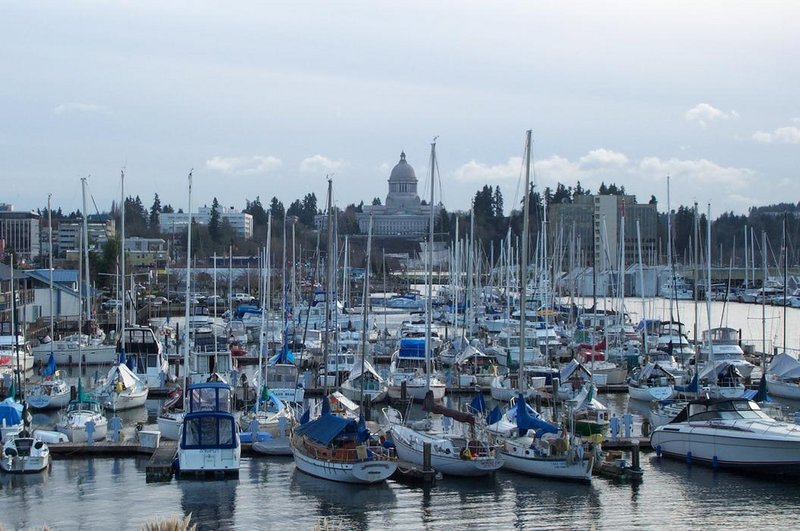
View of Washington State Capitol and Percival Landing

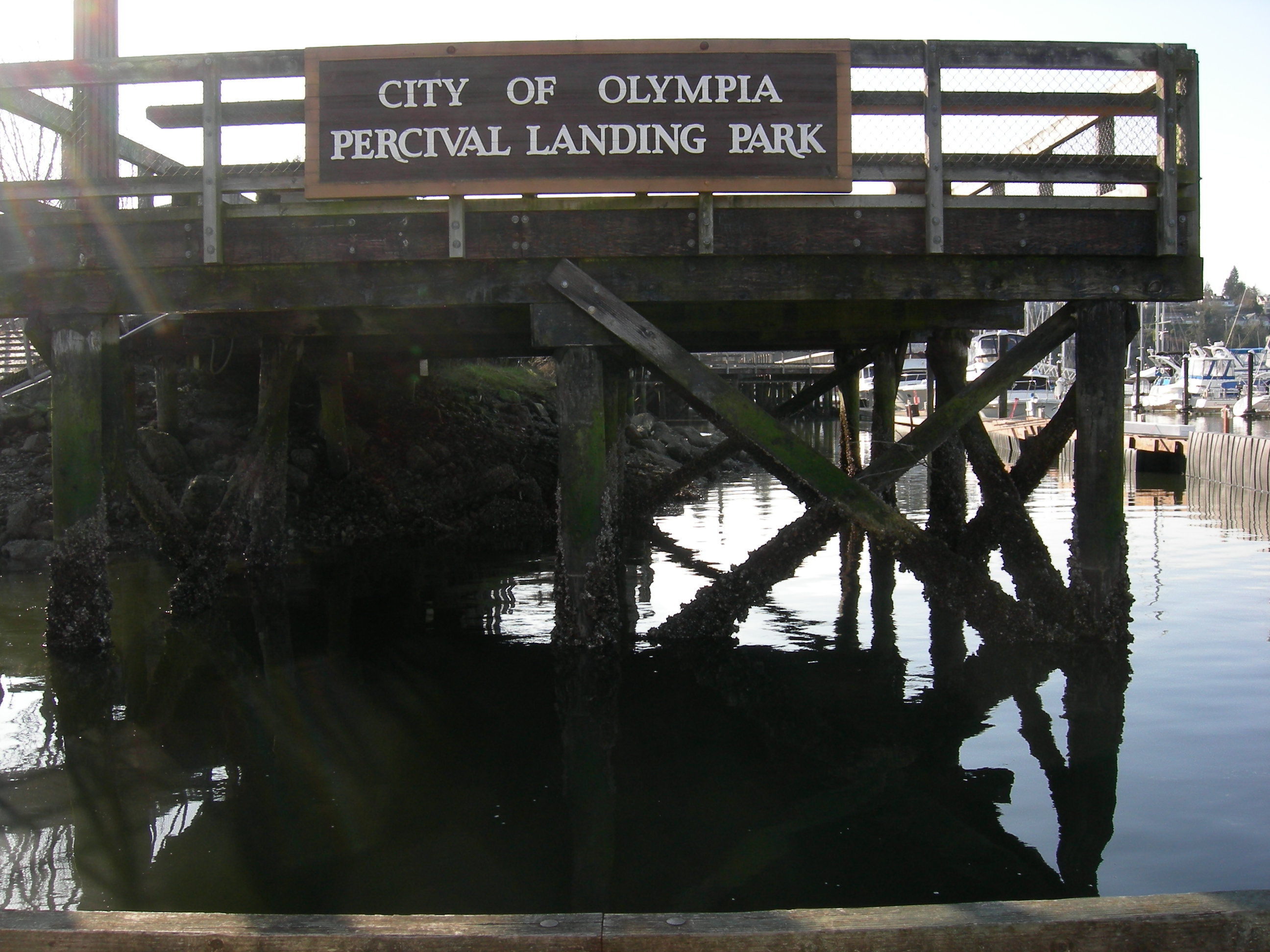
Pier, 2007

== Features ==
The park features picnic areas, public art, boat moorage and a playground. A 0.9-mile (1.4 km) boardwalk extends along the eastern shoreline of the West Bay of Budd Inlet from the Fourth Avenue Bridge to Thurston Avenue.

Plinths throughout the park display annual selections of sculptures by local artists and the community votes for the one to purchase for permanent display. The park includes a carved Orca by Olympia artist Joe Tougas, who competed an identical work for Yashiro, Olympia's sister city.

There are several events held annually at Percival Landing Park, including the annual Harbor Days festival and "Sand in the City", as well as the Wooden Boat Festival. The moorage is home to the historic Sand Man tugboat.

== See also ==
- History of Olympia, Washington
- Parks and recreation in Olympia, Washington
- Port of Olympia
