= Olympia Regional Airport =

Olympia Regional Airport Olympia Army Airfield
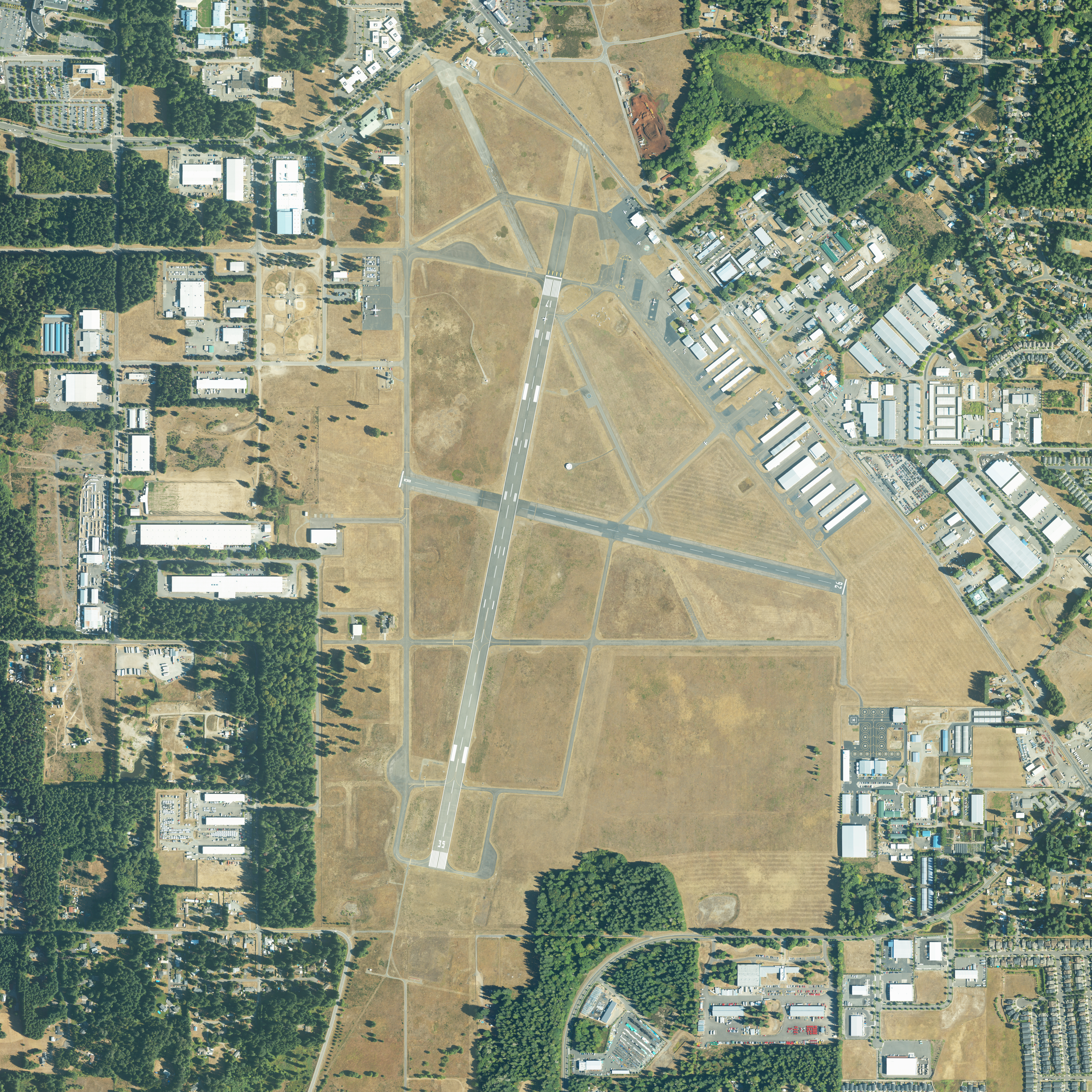
- Airport in August 2023
- IATA: OLM; ICAO: KOLM; FAA LID: OLM

Summary
- Airport type: Public
- Owner: Port of Olympia
- Operator: Port of Olympia
- Serves: Olympia, Washington
- Location: Tumwater, Washington
- Built: 1928
- Elevation AMSL: 208 ft (63 m)
- Coordinates: 46°58′10″N 122°54′09″W
- Website: Official Website

Map
- Location of Olympia Regional Airport KOLM (the United States)

Runways
Direction	Length		Surface
Direction	ft	m	Surface
8/26	4,157	1,267	Asphalt
17/35	5,500	1,676	Asphalt

Statistics (2019)
- Aircraft operations: 63,194
- Based aircraft: 125
- Sources: FAA, WSDOT, Port of Olympia

Olympia Regional Airport (IATA: OLM, ICAO: KOLM, FAA LID: OLM) is a public use airport located 4 nautical miles (7.4 km) south of Olympia, a city in Thurston County and the capital of the U.S. state of Washington. It is located within the city boundaries of Tumwater, which is south of Olympia and approximately 1 mile (1.6 km) east of Interstate 5. The airport is owned and operated by the Port of Olympia.

The Olympic Flight Museum is located at the Olympia Airport, and Airlift Northwest, the region's air medical transport service uses the airport as one of its medical helicopter bases; a large private-use heliport, known as Olympia Heliport (FAA LID: 0WN4) is located on airport grounds. The flight museum and the airport host an annual air show in June.

The airport's industrial park, 300 acres (1.2 km^{2}) in extent, includes a U.S. Department of Commerce-designated free-trade zone.

== History ==
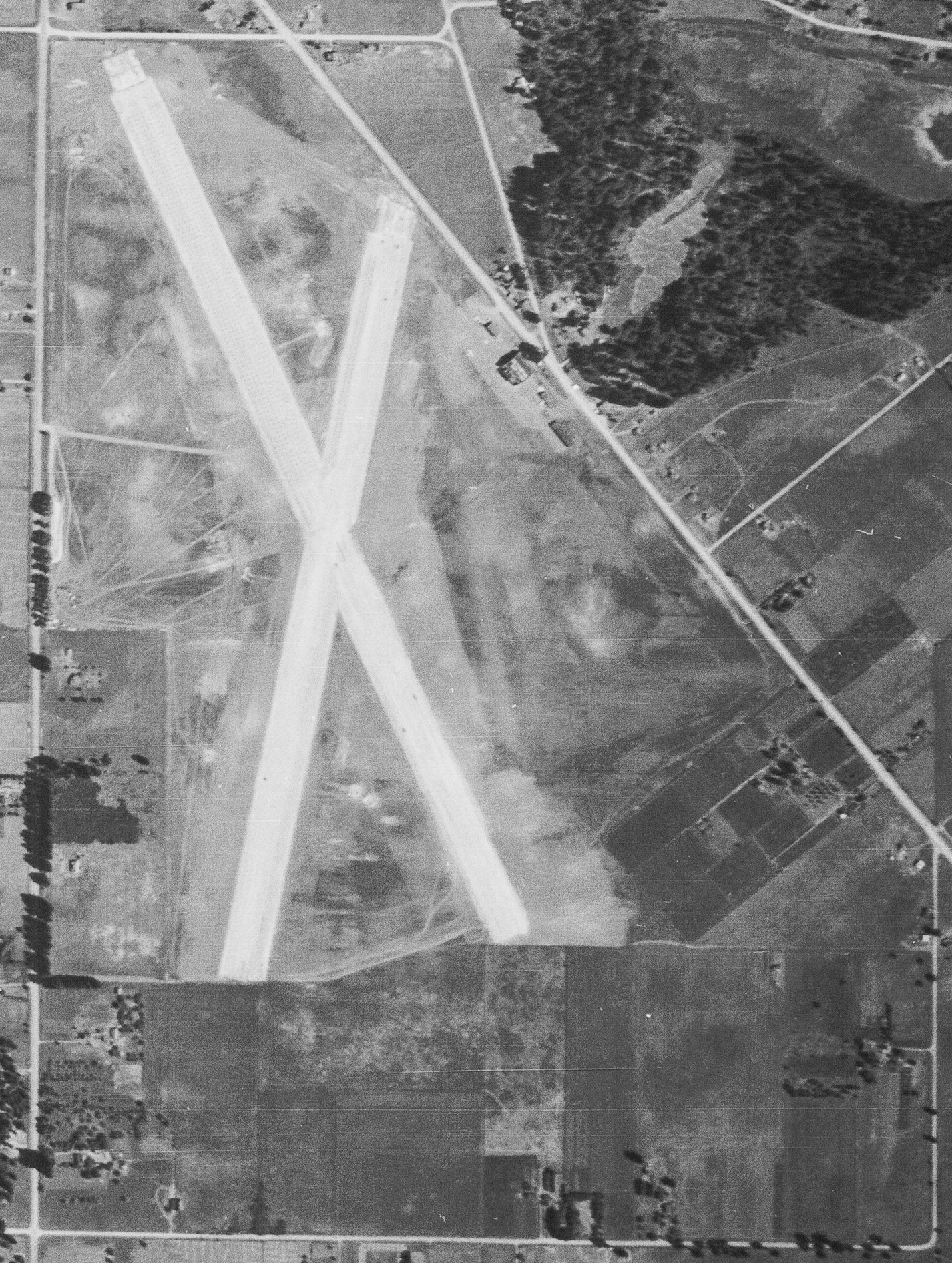
Airport in July 1941

The airport was built in 1928 at a cost of $35,000 (equivalent to $656,250 in 2025). An aircraft hangar was built and expanded in the 1930s and the airport facilitated training and chartered flights.

In 1941, after the start of World War II, the airport served as a satellite of nearby McChord Field. Between July 1942 and August 1943, it was home to the 37th Flying Training Squadron (part of the 55th Pursuit Group) and their fleet of P-43 Lancers and P-38H Lightning interceptors. The airport returned to the City of Olympia in 1947.

The airport now supports large business jets, cargo aircraft, military helicopters and has a backup runway lighting system for uninterrupted operations. Olympia Airport also has an ILS (Instrument Landing System) and backup power system for operations during bad weather or low visibility. The Olympia VOR, located on the field, also provides instrument approaches into the Olympia Airport in low visibility conditions.

The FAA funded a $15 million improvement project that was completed in September 2008. The work focused on runway line-of-sight improvements and enhanced taxiway and runway signage. In the late 1990s, the airport's runway protection zone was extended with the purchase of $5.5 million worth of land on each end of the primary runway, and an above ground fuel facility was constructed.

== Facilities and aircraft ==
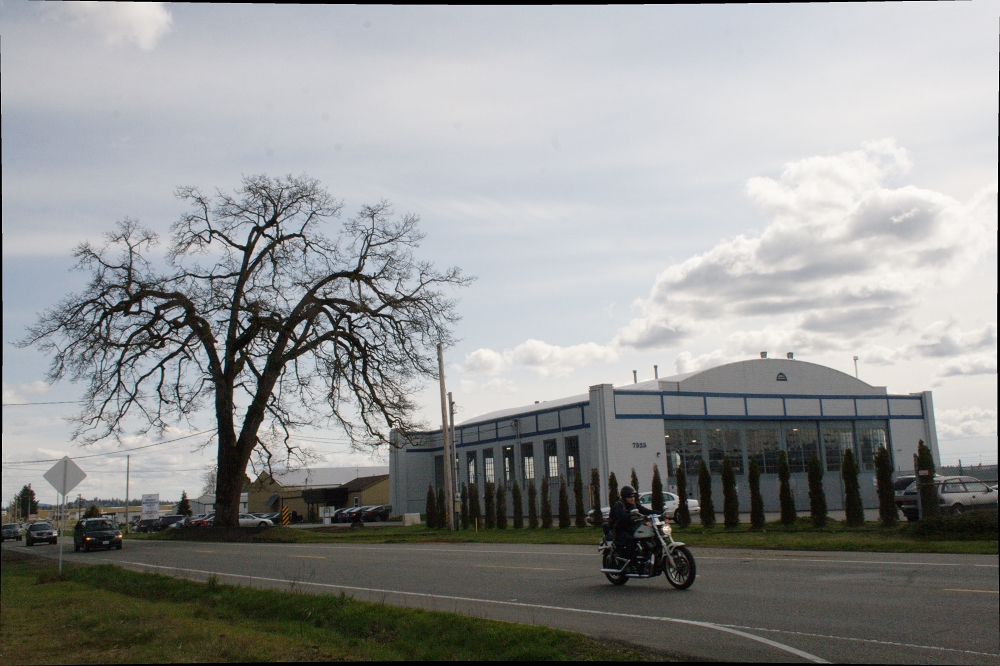
Aircraft hangar and Davis-Meeker Oak, 2011

Olympia Regional Airport covers an area of 845 acres (342 ha) at an elevation of 208 feet (63 m) above mean sea level. It has two asphalt paved runways: 17/35 is 5,500 by 150 feet with precision markings (1,676 x 46 m) and runway 8/26 is 4,157 by 150 feet with basic markings (1,267 x 46 m). The airport has a passenger terminal, an air traffic control tower and a full-instrument landing approach system.

The field is home to fixed wing and helicopter flight instruction, major aircraft and oxygen maintenance facilities, the Washington State Patrol aviation division, and a key navigational aid (Olympia VOR) that is used by commercial flights inbound to Seattle-area airports, including Seattle-Tacoma International Airport, as well as by general aviation aircraft in the region.

== Airlines ==
=== Passenger ===
Airlines	Destinations
SeaPort Airlines	Seasonal: Spokane-Felts (begins January 8, 2027)

=== Cargo ===
Airlines	Destinations
Ameriflight	Seattle

== See also ==
- List of airports in Washington
- Washington World War II Army Airfields
