= Olympia, Washington =

Capital city of Washington, United States

Olympia st̕č̓as (Lushootseed)
- State capital city
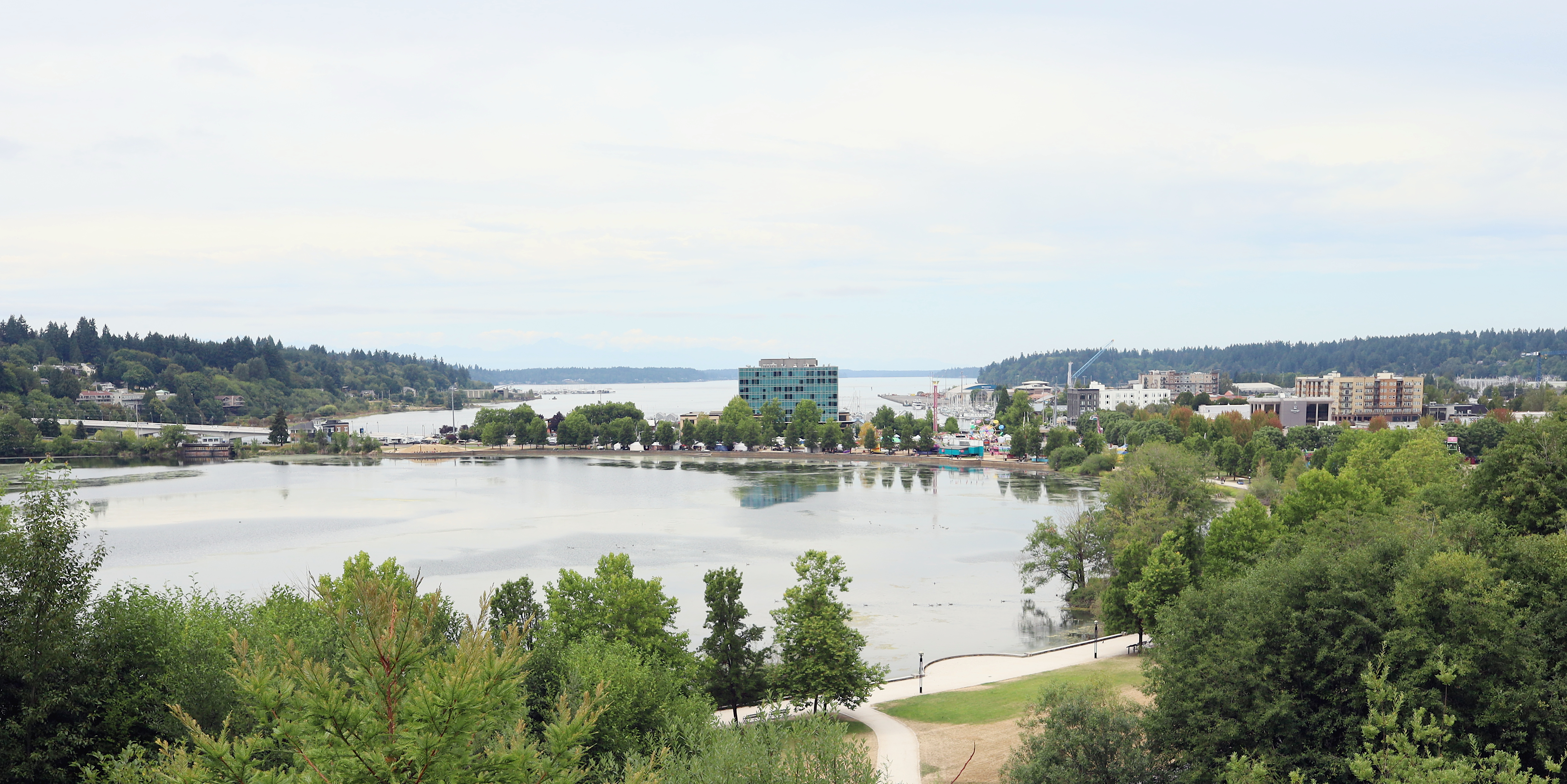
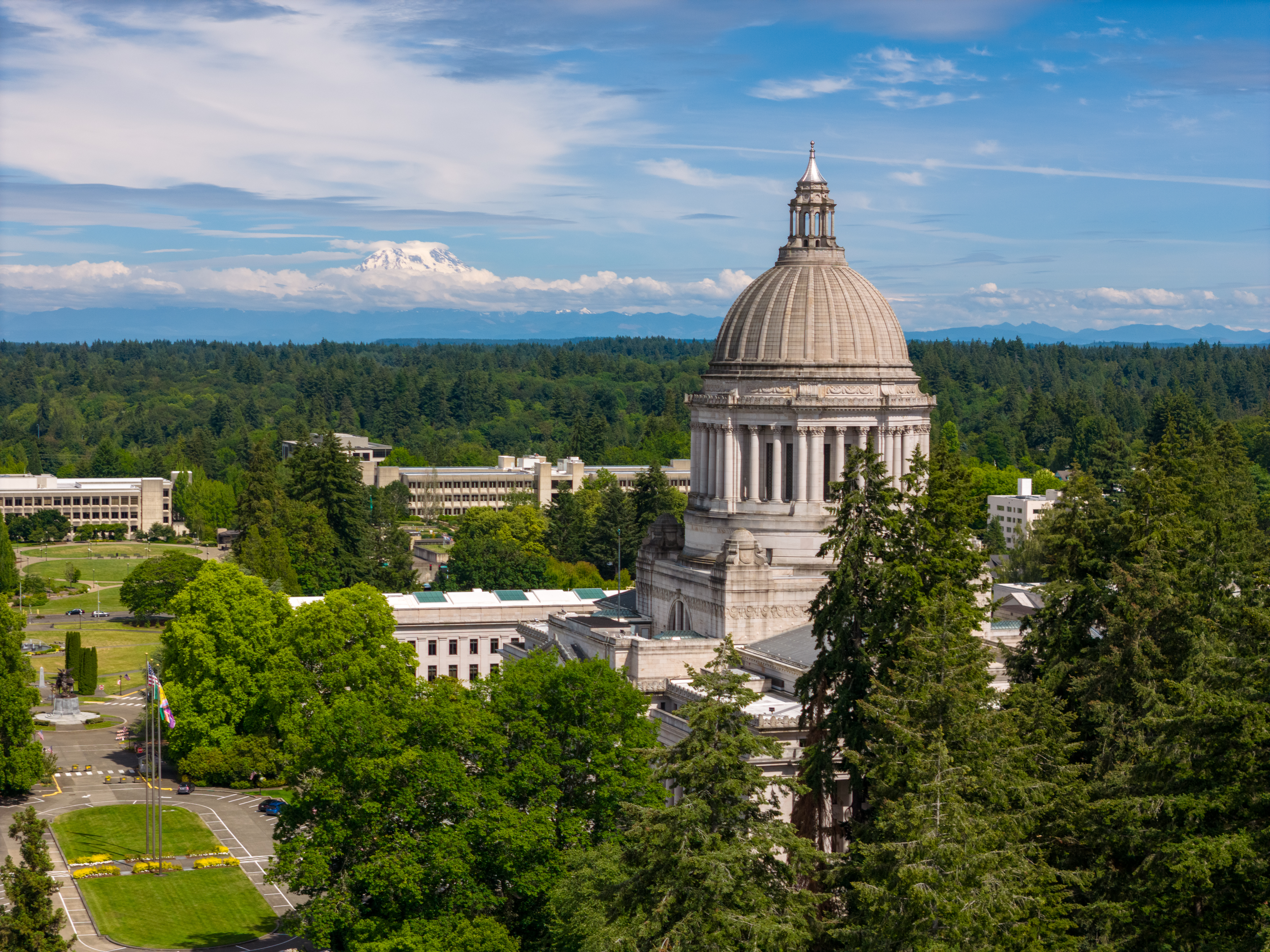
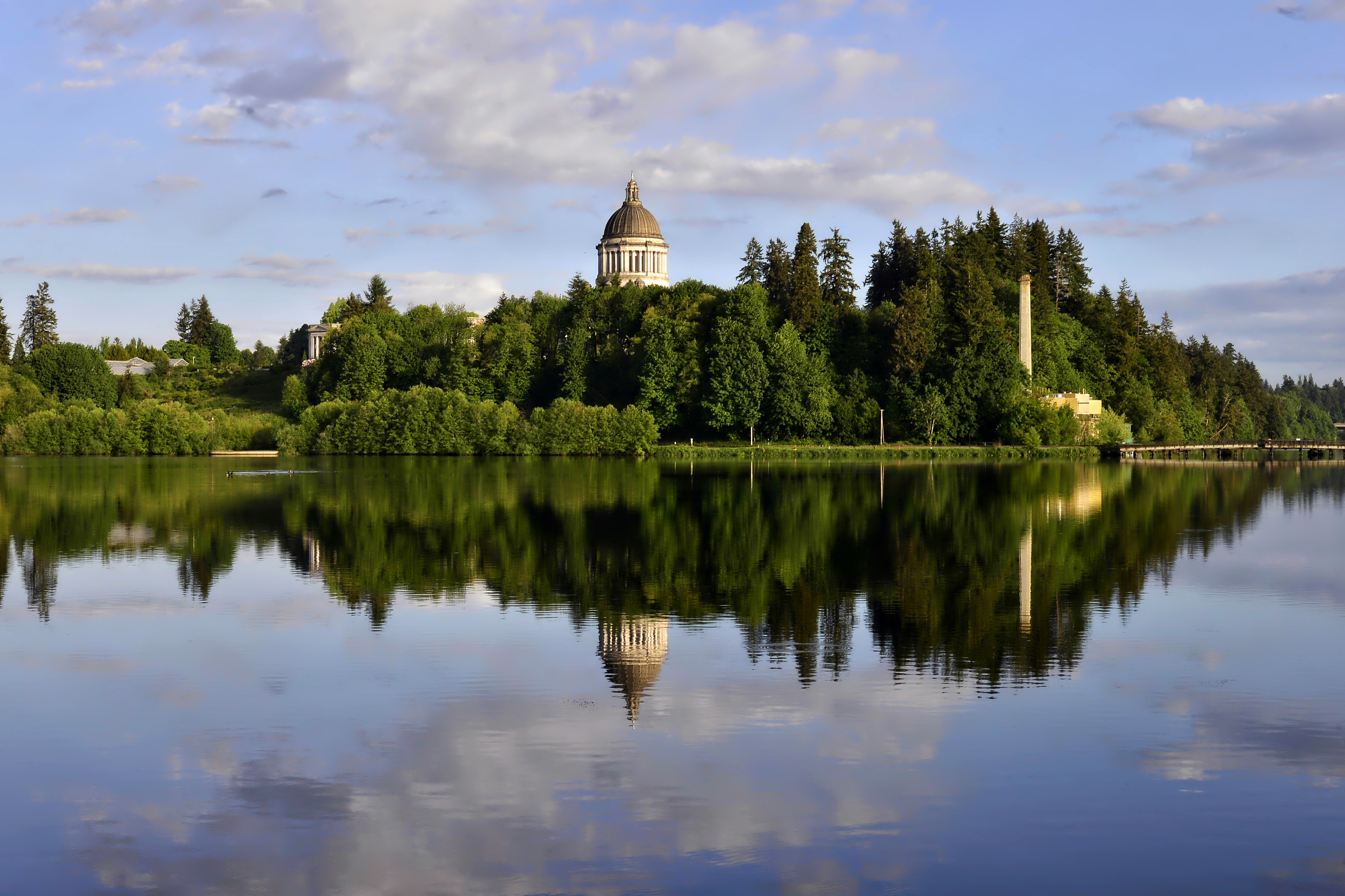
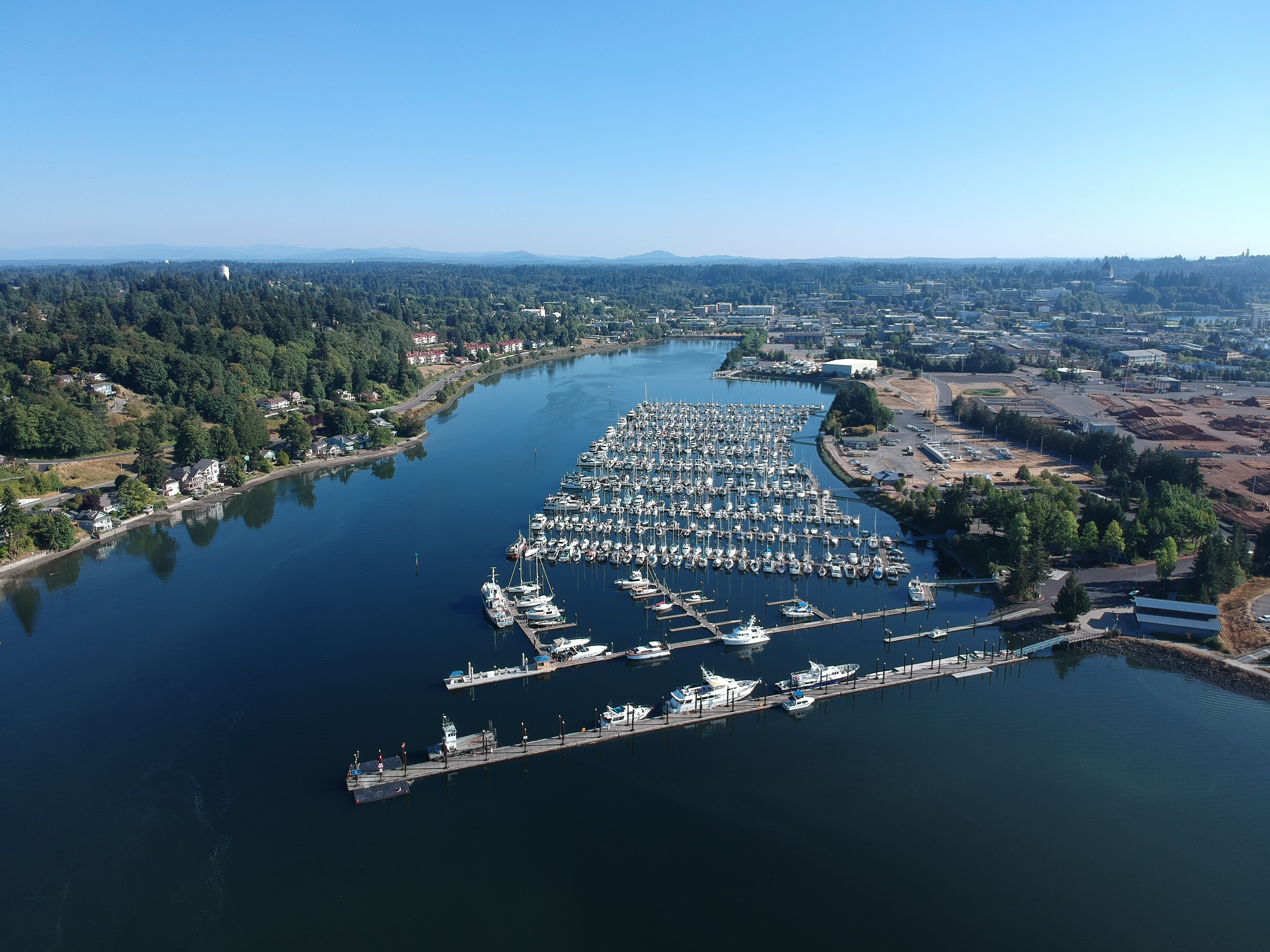
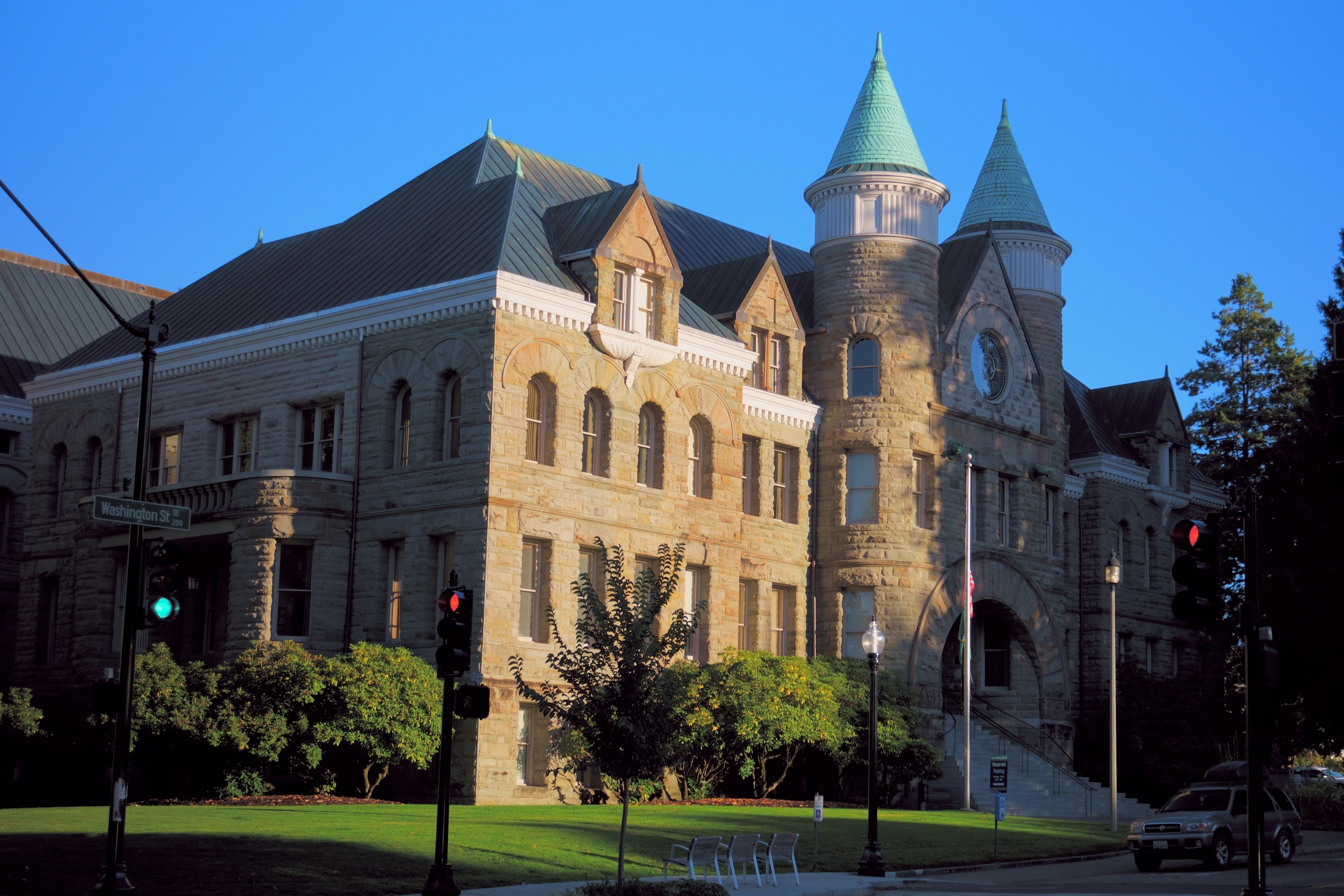
- Downtown Olympia during Lakefair Washington State Capitol and Mount Rainier Capitol Lake Budd Inlet Old Capitol Building

- Flag Seal Logo
- Nickname: Oly
- Interactive map of Olympia
- Location within Washington (state) Location within the United States
- Coordinates: 47°2′16″N 122°54′3″W
- Country: United States
- State: Washington
- County: Thurston
- Founded: 1850
- Incorporated: January 28, 1859
- Named for: Olympic Mountains

Government
  - Type: Council–manager
  - Mayor: Dontae Payne (D)
  - City manager: Jay Burney

Area
  - City: 20.08 sq mi (52.0 km^{2})
  - Land: 18.22 sq mi (47.2 km^{2})
  - Water: 1.86 sq mi (4.8 km^{2})
- Elevation: 95 ft (29 m)

Population (2020)
  - City: 55,605
  - Estimate (2024): 56,271
  - Rank: US: 718th WA: 24th
  - Density: 2,902.3/sq mi (1,120.58/km^{2})
  - Urban: 208,157 (US: 182nd)
  - Urban density: 1,960/sq mi (760/km^{2})
  - Metro: 298,758 (US: 172nd)
- Demonym: Olympian
- Time zone: UTC-8 (Pacific (PST))
  - Summer (DST): UTC-7 (PDT)
- ZIP codes: 98501–98509, 98511–98513, 98516, 98599
- Area code: 360, 564
- FIPS code: 53-51300
- GNIS feature ID: 1533353
- Website: olympiawa.gov

Olympia is the capital city of the U.S. state of Washington. The population was 55,605 at the 2020 census, while the Olympia metropolitan statistical area has an estimated 300,000 residents. Olympia is the county seat of Thurston County and anchors the South Puget Sound region of western Washington, 50 miles (80 km) southwest of Seattle.

The Squaxin and other Coast Salish peoples inhabited the southern Puget Sound region prior to the arrival of European and American settlers in the 19th century. The Treaty of Medicine Creek was signed in 1854 and followed by the Treaty of Olympia in 1856; these two treaties forced the Squaxin to relocate to an Indian reservation. Olympia was declared the capital of the Washington Territory in 1853 and incorporated as a town on January 28, 1859. It became a city in 1881.

Aside from its role in the state government, Olympia is also recognized as a countercultural hub in the Pacific Northwest. The city's music scene gained prominence in the 1990s for its role in the emergence of punk rock movements such as riot grrrl and grunge. The Olympia area is also home to The Evergreen State College, a public liberal arts institution known for its non-traditional curriculum. Intercity Transit provides fare-free bus service throughout the Olympia area, which has high per-capita use of public transportation relative to other cities of its size.

== History ==
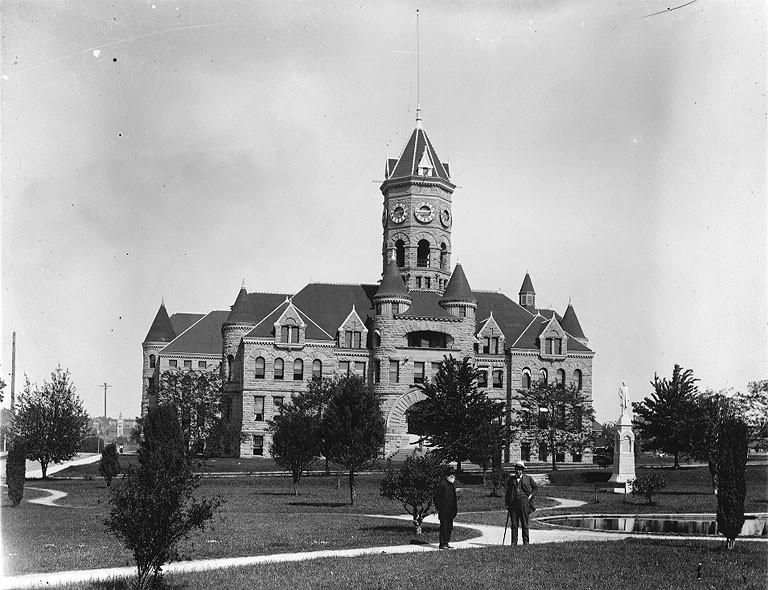
The Old Capitol Building in 1906

For thousands of years, the site of Olympia has been home to the Lushootseed-speaking people known as the Stechass (Lushootseed: st̕əč̓asəbš), who are today part of the Squaxin Island Tribe. Other Native Americans regularly visited the head of Budd Inlet, including the other ancestral tribes of the Squaxin, as well as the Nisqually, Puyallup, Chehalis, Suquamish, and Duwamish. The peninsula on which Olympia was built was named bəsčətxʷəd, meaning 'black bear place,' and a Stechass village was located at the site of Olympia. The modern city of Olympia has come to be called st̕č̓as (Note: Also spelled st̕əč̓as.) in the Lushootseed language; originally the name referred to all Budd Inlet.

The first recorded Europeans came to Olympia in 1792. Peter Puget and a crew from the British Vancouver Expedition are said to have explored the site, but neither recorded any encounters with the resident Indigenous population. In 1846, Edmund Sylvester and Levi Lathrop Smith jointly claimed the land that is now downtown Olympia. In 1851, the U.S. Congress established the Customs District of Puget Sound for Washington Territory and Olympia became the home of the customs house. Its population steadily expanded from Oregon Trail immigrants. In 1850, the town settled on the name Olympia, at local resident Colonel Isaac N. Ebey's suggestion, because of its view of the Olympic Mountains to the northwest. The area began to be served by a small fleet of steamboats known as the Puget Sound Mosquito Fleet. It was declared the capital of the Washington Territories by Governor Isaac I. Stevens in November 1853. Olympia was the first and only capital of Washington in its history as both a territory and a state.

Over two days, December 24–26, 1854, Governor Stevens negotiated the Treaty of Medicine Creek with the representatives of the Nisqually, Puyallup, Squawksin, Stechass, Noo-Seh-Chatl, Squi-Aitl, T'Peeksin, Sahewamish, and S'Hotl-Ma-Mish tribes. Stevens's treaty included the preservation of Indigenous fishing, hunting, gathering and other rights. It also included a section which, at least as interpreted by United States officials, required the Native American signatories to move to one of three reservations. Doing so would effectively force the Nisqually people to cede their prime farming and living space. An additional agreement between the state, city, and indigenous groups, known as the Treaty of Olympia or as the Quinault Treaty, was completed during 1855. One of the leaders of the Nisqually, Chief Leschi, outraged, refused to give up ownership of this land and instead fought for his people's right to their territory, sparking the beginning of the Puget Sound War. The war ended with Leschi's capture in 1856; he was executed two years later.

Olympia was incorporated as a fourth-class municipality, commonly referred to as a town, on January 28, 1859, and as a charter city on December 1, 1881.

The 1949 Olympia earthquake damaged many historic buildings beyond repair, and they were demolished. Parts of the city also suffered damage from earthquakes in 1965 and 2001.

Interstate 5 was built through the south side of the city in the late 1950s as a replacement for earlier highways that traveled through downtown Olympia. The freeway was originally planned to cut through the city, but was moved farther out to save costs. It opened to traffic on December 12, 1958, and was later expanded in 1991.

On December 22, 1977, the City of Olympia was reclassified as a non-charter code city.

== Geography ==
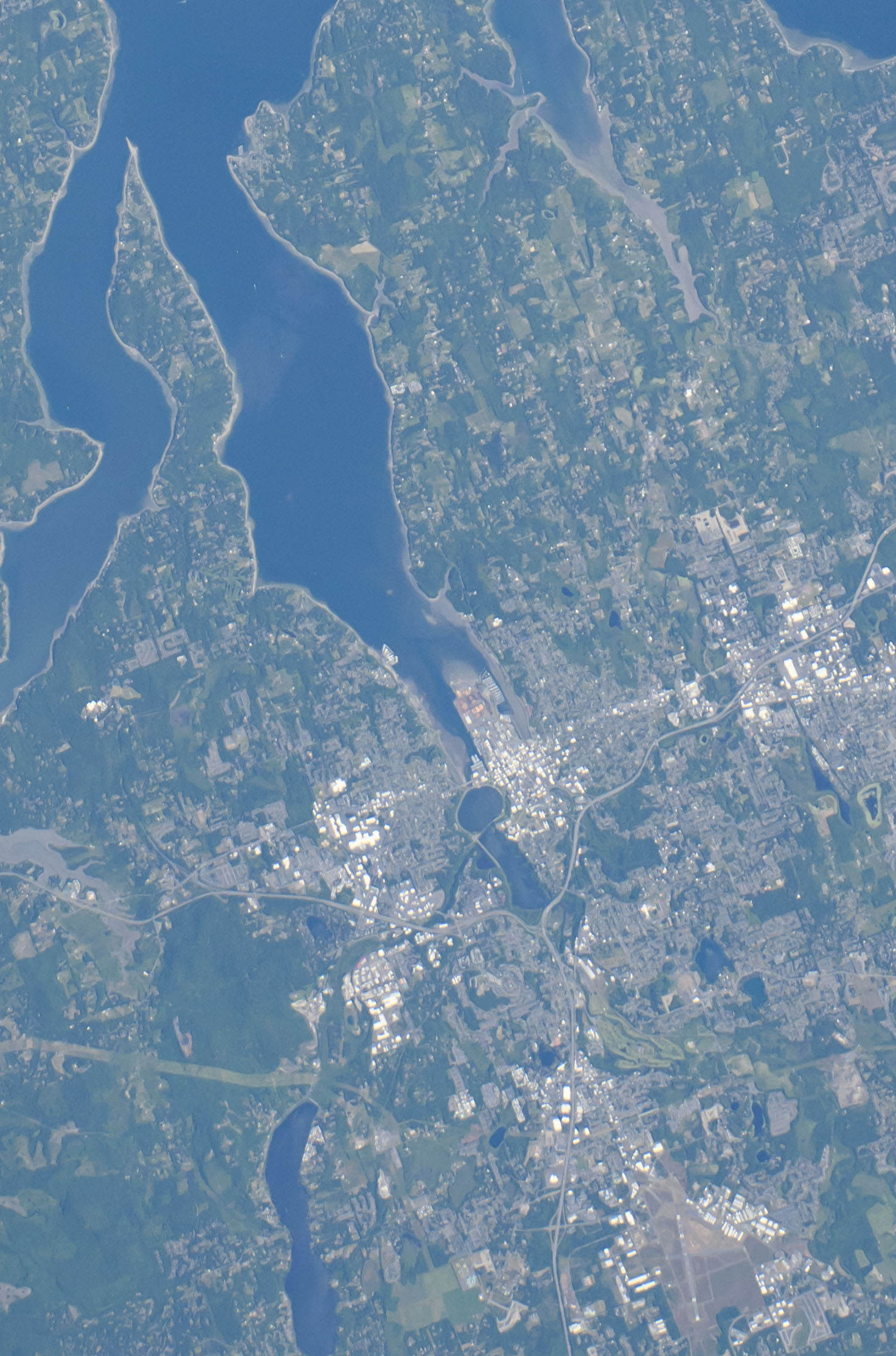
View from ISS Expedition 71, June 2024

Olympia is located in Thurston County at the southern end of Puget Sound on Budd Inlet, where the Deschutes River estuary enters the Sound. The river was dammed in 1951 to create Capitol Lake; in late 2022 the state government approved the dam's removal to restore the estuary at an unspecified date.

The city is 47 miles (76 km) southwest of Seattle, the most populous city in Washington, and 100 miles (160 km) north of Portland, Oregon. The cities of Lacey and Tumwater border Olympia.

As of 2024, Olympia had an area of 20.08 square miles (52.01 km^{2}), of which 18.22 sq mi (47.19 km^{2}) was land and 1.86 sq mi (4.82 km^{2}) was water.

The area is located near the southern limit of the Fraser Glaciation and the underlying sediments consist largely of Vashon-age till and outwash deposited at that time; the area also includes former lakebeds and alluvial deposits associated with proglacial lakes that existed in the area near the end of Vashon-stage glaciation. Residual glacial topography in the area includes drumlins, subglacial channels, and kettle lakes. Much of downtown Olympia sits on reclaimed land. Tidewater areas were filled as early as the 1870s, but the major change occurred in 1910–11 with placement of the Carlyon Fill (named for mayor Phillip H. Carlyon). Over two million cubic yards (1,500,000 m^{3}) of sediment were dredged, thereby creating a deep-water port at Olympia; the dredged material was used to fill tidelands, creating almost 30 blocks of what is now downtown.

=== Climate ===
Olympia has a warm-summer Mediterranean climate (Köppen: Csb). The local microclimate has dry summers in July and mildly humid summers in early June and late August, with cool July and August overnight lows. It is part of USDA Hardiness zone 8a, with isolated pockets around Puget Sound in zone 8b. Most of western Washington's weather is brought in by weather systems that form near the Aleutian Islands in Alaska. It contains cold moist air, which brings western Washington cold rain, cloudiness, and fog. November through January are Olympia's rainiest months. City streets, creeks, and rivers can flood from November to February. The monthly mean temperature ranges from 38.4 °F (3.6 °C) in December to 64.1 °F (17.8 °C) in August. Seasonal snowfall for 1981–2010 averaged 10.8 inches (27.4 cm) but has historically ranged from trace amounts in 1991–92 to 81.5 in (207 cm) in 1968–69.

Climate chart for Olympia

Olympia averages 50 inches (1,270 mm) of precipitation annually and has a year-round average of 75% cloud cover. Annual precipitation has ranged from 29.92 in (760 mm) in 1952 to 66.71 in (1,694 mm) in 1950; for water year (October 1 – September 30) precipitation, the range is 32.71 in (831 mm) in 2000–01 to 72.57 in (1,843 mm) in 1998–99. With a period of record dating back to 1948, extreme temperatures have ranged from −8 °F (−22 °C) on January 1, 1979, up to 110 °F (43 °C), on June 28, 2021; the record cold daily maximum is 18 °F (−8 °C) on January 31, 1950, while, conversely, the record warm daily minimum is 69 °F (21 °C) on July 22, 2006. Between 1991 and 2020 the mean coldest daily maximum was right on the freezing point at 32 °F (0 °C) and the warmest night of the year averaged a very mild 60 °F (16 °C).

On average, 6.3 days annually reach 90 °F (32 °C), 1.8 days stay at or below freezing all day, and 78 nights reach the freezing mark. The average window for freezing temperatures is October 8 through May 3, allowing a growing season of 157 days, nearly 100 days shorter than in Seattle.

Climate data for Olympia Regional Airport, Washington (1991−2020 normals, extremes 1948−present)
Month	Jan	Feb	Mar	Apr	May	Jun	Jul	Aug	Sep	Oct	Nov	Dec	Year
Record high °F (°C)	64 (18)	73 (23)	79 (26)	88 (31)	96 (36)	110 (43)	104 (40)	104 (40)	98 (37)	90 (32)	74 (23)	64 (18)	110 (43)
Mean maximum °F (°C)	56.3 (13.5)	59.4 (15.2)	67.9 (19.9)	76.2 (24.6)	83.9 (28.8)	87.9 (31.1)	93.6 (34.2)	92.2 (33.4)	86.3 (30.2)	73.7 (23.2)	61.5 (16.4)	55.5 (13.1)	96.0 (35.6)
Mean daily maximum °F (°C)	46.0 (7.8)	49.1 (9.5)	53.7 (12.1)	58.9 (14.9)	66.1 (18.9)	70.8 (21.6)	77.6 (25.3)	78.0 (25.6)	72.1 (22.3)	60.2 (15.7)	50.6 (10.3)	44.9 (7.2)	60.7 (15.9)
Daily mean °F (°C)	39.6 (4.2)	40.7 (4.8)	44.1 (6.7)	48.2 (9.0)	54.5 (12.5)	59.1 (15.1)	64.2 (17.9)	64.2 (17.9)	59.1 (15.1)	50.3 (10.2)	43.2 (6.2)	38.9 (3.8)	50.5 (10.3)
Mean daily minimum °F (°C)	33.2 (0.7)	32.3 (0.2)	34.5 (1.4)	37.5 (3.1)	43.0 (6.1)	47.4 (8.6)	50.7 (10.4)	50.5 (10.3)	46.2 (7.9)	40.5 (4.7)	35.8 (2.1)	32.8 (0.4)	40.4 (4.7)
Mean minimum °F (°C)	18.8 (−7.3)	19.0 (−7.2)	23.9 (−4.5)	27.5 (−2.5)	32.3 (0.2)	38.4 (3.6)	42.7 (5.9)	41.9 (5.5)	35.9 (2.2)	27.9 (−2.3)	21.6 (−5.8)	18.4 (−7.6)	12.6 (−10.8)
Record low °F (°C)	−8 (−22)	−1 (−18)	9 (−13)	23 (−5)	25 (−4)	30 (−1)	35 (2)	33 (1)	25 (−4)	14 (−10)	−1 (−18)	−7 (−22)	−8 (−22)
Average precipitation inches (mm)	7.80 (198)	5.09 (129)	5.68 (144)	3.67 (93)	2.26 (57)	1.46 (37)	0.53 (13)	0.96 (24)	2.04 (52)	5.07 (129)	8.21 (209)	7.85 (199)	50.62 (1,286)
Average snowfall inches (cm)	2.0 (5.1)	0.6 (1.5)	0.1 (0.25)	0.0 (0.0)	0.0 (0.0)	0.0 (0.0)	0.0 (0.0)	0.0 (0.0)	0.0 (0.0)	0.0 (0.0)	0.0 (0.0)	1.2 (3.0)	3.9 (9.9)
Average precipitation days (≥ 0.01 in)	20.3	16.4	18.8	16.3	11.4	8.5	4.0	4.8	8.1	15.1	19.5	20.2	163.4
Average snowy days (≥ 0.1 in)	0.5	0.7	0.1	0.0	0.0	0.0	0.0	0.0	0.0	0.0	0.1	0.8	2.2
Average relative humidity (%)	87.5	84.5	80.0	75.6	72.9	72.4	70.8	72.1	77.6	85.1	88.4	89.1	79.7
Average dew point °F (°C)	34.5 (1.4)	36.0 (2.2)	36.9 (2.7)	39.2 (4.0)	43.9 (6.6)	48.9 (9.4)	52.0 (11.1)	52.7 (11.5)	49.6 (9.8)	44.8 (7.1)	39.6 (4.2)	35.4 (1.9)	42.8 (6.0)
Source 1: NOAA (dew points and relative humidity 1961–1990)
Source 2: National Weather Service

=== Artesian water ===
Olympia was historically dependent on artesian waters, including springs that supplied early settlers in Swantown and Tumwater. The artesian spring at Fourth Avenue and Main Street (now called Capitol Way) was the main community well where settlers, as well as the local Stechass and visiting Native Americans, gathered to socialize. Settler accounts recall paying Native Americans to collect water here. The artesian well at Artesian Commons park, a former parking lot, is active. Another still flows at the corner of Olympia Avenue and Washington Street. A small park was constructed around another spring in the Bigelow Neighborhood. The northeast end of Capitol Lake was the location of an artesian well until the construction of a new park that included changes to the shoreline. McAllister Springs, Olympia's main water source, is fed by artesian wells, and the former Olympia Brewery is supplied by 26 artesian wells.

Efforts to protect and preserve the free-flowing artesian well on 4th Avenue in downtown Olympia began in 1991 with support from a local coffee roaster. Donations from the public were used to form "Friends of the Artesians", a group that researched the wells, maintained them, and tested their quality. They were later replaced by the non-profit organization H2Olympia in 2009. In 2011, the city of Olympia committed $50,000 toward improvements of an artesian well in a parking lot that the city purchased the same year. Renovations at the well were completed in late 2011, including surface improvements, solar lighting, and a raised area to fill bottles. In spring 2012, sea-themed mosaic artwork created by community members was installed at the site of the well.

== Demographics ==
Historical population
Census	Pop.	Note	%±
1870	1,203		—
1880	1,232		2.4%
1890	4,698		281.3%
1900	3,863		−17.8%
1910	6,996		81.1%
1920	7,795		11.4%
1930	11,733		50.5%
1940	13,254		13.0%
1950	15,819		19.4%
1960	18,273		15.5%
1970	23,296		27.5%
1980	27,447		17.8%
1990	33,840		23.3%
2000	42,514		25.6%
2010	46,478		9.3%
2020	55,605		19.6%
2024 (est.)	56,271		1.2%
U.S. Decennial Census; 2020 Census

=== 2020 census ===
As of the 2020 census, Olympia had a population of 55,605. The median age was 39.0 years. 19.4% of residents were under the age of 18 and 18.3% of residents were 65 years of age or older. For every 100 females there were 90.6 males, and for every 100 females age 18 and over there were 86.1 males age 18 and over.

The population density was 2,825 inhabitants per square mile (1,090.7/km^{2}), and there were 25,642 housing units at an average density of 1,303 units per square mile (503 units/km^{2}). Of these, 4.9% were vacant, the homeowner vacancy rate was 0.8%, and the rental vacancy rate was 4.2%.

There were 24,393 households in Olympia, of which 25.3% had children under the age of 18 living in them. Of all households, 36.7% were married-couple households, 20.4% were households with a male householder and no spouse or partner present, and 33.7% were households with a female householder and no spouse or partner present. About 35.5% of all households were made up of individuals and 14.4% had someone living alone who was 65 years of age or older.

100.0% of residents lived in urban areas, while 0.0% lived in rural areas.

Racial composition as of the 2020 census
Race	Number	Percent
White	41,052	73.8%
Black or African American	1,759	3.2%
American Indian and Alaska Native	690	1.2%
Asian	3,745	6.7%
Native Hawaiian and Other Pacific Islander	367	0.7%
Some other race	1,762	3.2%
Two or more races	6,230	11.2%
Hispanic or Latino (of any race)	5,059	9.1%

=== 2010 census ===
As of the 2010 census, there were 46,478 people, 20,761 households, and 10,672 families residing in the city. The population density was 2,608.2 inhabitants per square mile (1,007.0/km^{2}). There were 22,086 housing units at an average density of 1,239.4 units per square mile (478.5 units/km^{2}). The racial makeup of the city was 83.7% White, 2.0% African American, 1.1% Native American, 6.0% Asian, 0.4% Pacific Islander, 1.8% from other races, and 5.0% from two or more races. Hispanic or Latino of any race were 6.3% of the population.

There were 20,761 households, of which 25.6% had children under the age of 18 living with them, 36.2% were married couples living together, 11.3% had a female householder with no husband present, 3.9% had a male householder with no wife present, and 48.6% were other families. 36.3% of all households were made up of individuals, and 11.7% had someone living alone who was 65 years of age or older. The average household size was 2.18 and the average family size was 2.83.

The median age in the city was 38 years. 19.5% of residents were under the age of 18; 11.2% were between the ages of 18 and 24; 28.5% were from 25 to 44; 26.7% were from 45 to 64; and 13.9% were 65 years of age or older. The gender makeup of the city was 47.3% male and 52.7% female.

== Government ==
The City of Olympia operates as a Council–manager government, with a mayor and 6 elected council members. The council appoints a city manager to operate the City and direct employees. As of the fiscal year 2023, the city had a general fund budget of $114 million and a full-time staff of 600.

=== Sanctuary city ===
In February 2025, the Olympia city council passed a resolution declaring the city a sanctuary city for LGBTQ+ people, guaranteeing municipal-level protections on top of existing state laws enshrining LGBT rights.

== Economy ==
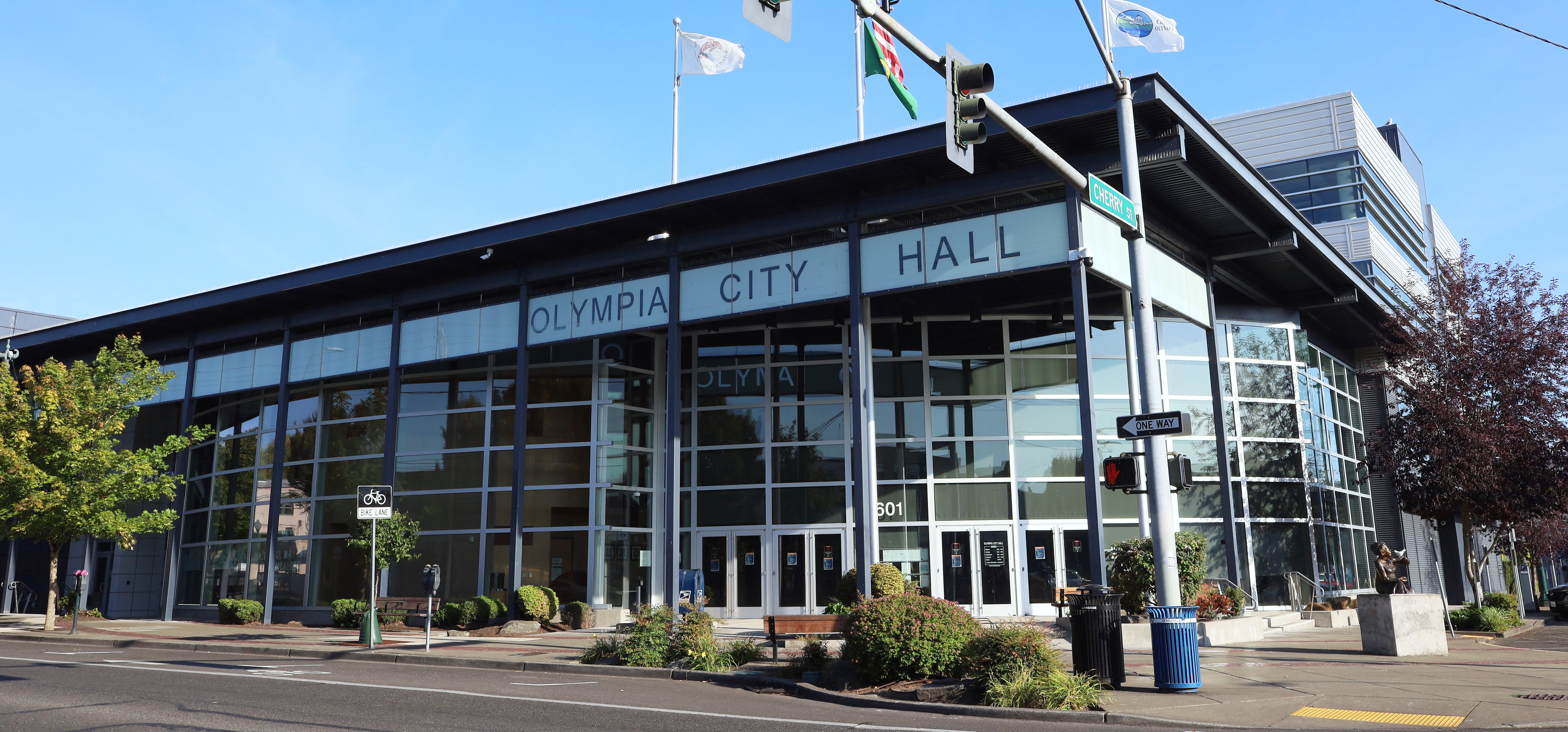
Olympia City Hall, August 2025

As of December 2024, the unemployment rate was 4.7% and the median household income was $76,930, a 45% increase from 2015.

=== Largest employers ===
Largest employers in Olympia, Washington (as of 2024)
Rank	Employer	Number of employees	
Rank	Employer	2024	2015
1	State Government, including education	▲27,459	24,144
2	Local Government, including education	▲12,530	11,828
3	Providence St. Peter Hospital	▲2,100	1,600
4	Albertsons	▲1,100	876
5	Lucky Eagle Casino and Hotel	▲1,000	600
6	Walmart	▼750	1,023
7	Nisqually Red Wind Casino	▲700	600
8	South Sound YMCA	▲550	-
9	Fred Meyer	▲550	-
10	Continuum Global Solutions	▲500	-

== Arts and culture ==
=== Arts Walk ===
Arts Walk is public community event which takes places twice each year: on the 4th Friday and Saturday in April and on the 1st Friday and Saturday in October. It is estimated to attract 30,000 visitors and features the work of over 400 artists at more than 100 participating locations. The April event includes Procession of the Species.

=== Fine arts ===
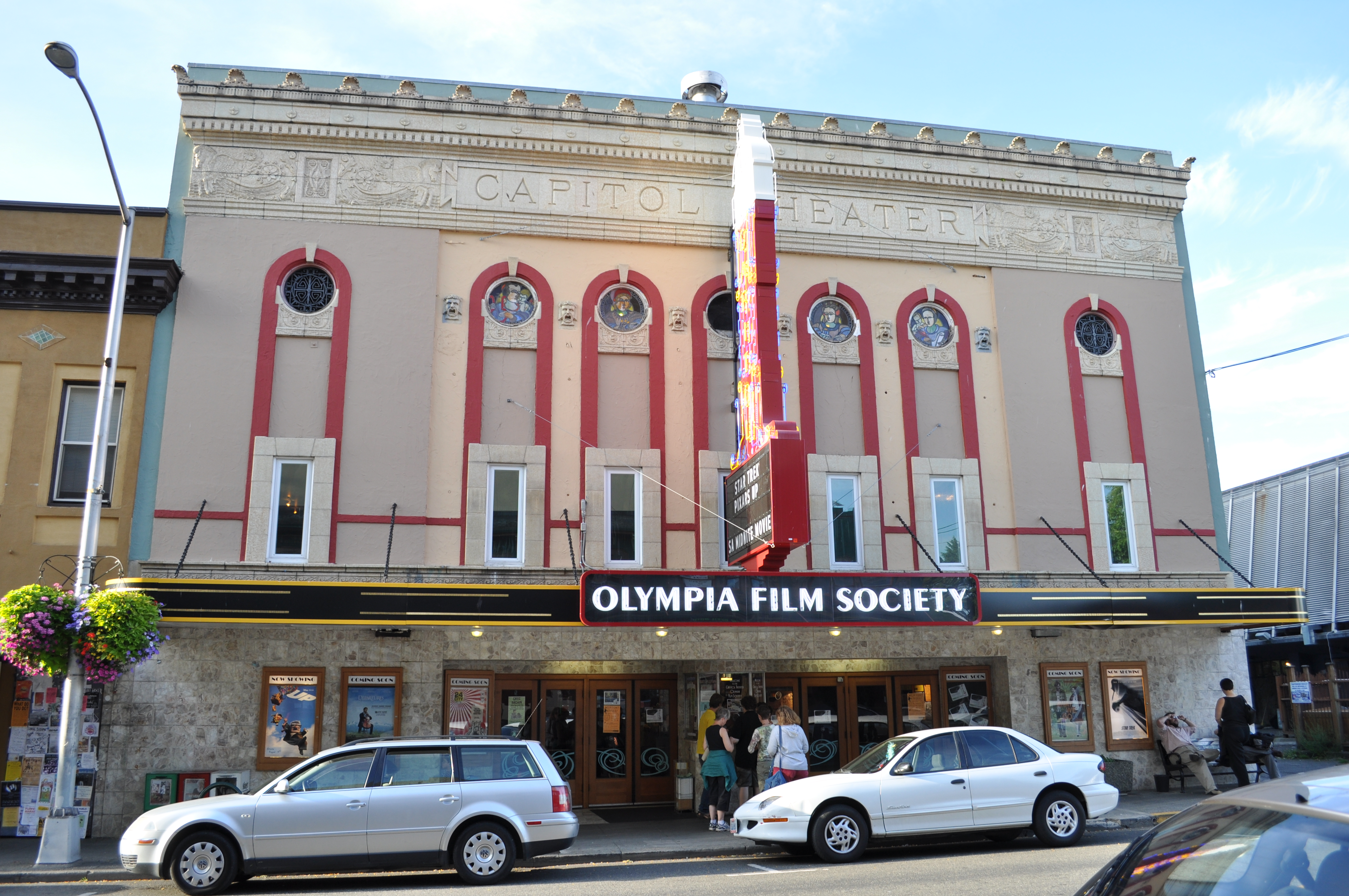
The Capitol Theater, home of the Olympia Film Society

Olympia is a regional center for fine arts. A number of theatrical experiences are available with companies such as Animal Fire Theater, Olympia Family Theater, Olympia Little Theater, Theater Artists Olympia, Broadway Olympia Productions, and Harlequin Productions at the historic State Theater, as well as Broadway Olympia's Black Box Theater at Capitol Mall. The Olympia Symphony Orchestra performs five regular-season concerts at the Washington Center and two pops concerts. The Masterworks Chorale Ensemble performs four regular-season concerts at the Washington Center for the Performing Arts.

Visual art venues include some of the local coffeehouses, Olympia Coffee Roasting Co., Batdorf & Bronson, and Burial Grounds downtown, with the latter indefinitely closed. Art House Designs is an art gallery that also hosts a jazz performance space. The Washington Center for the Performing Arts also presents visual art exhibitions throughout the season in its lobby areas.

Notable art venues near Olympia include Art in Ecology, housed in Washington Department of Ecology's 322,000-square-foot, three-story building on the campus of Saint Martin's University. Art in Ecology is a long-established art-in-the-workplace venue that has works by numerous northwest artists. Permanent installations by Alfredo Arreguin, commissioned by the Washington State Arts Commission, are accompanied by changing solo and group exhibitions throughout the year. Appointments to view the works are needed; tours take about an hour.

South Puget Sound Community College has a gallery in its Minnaert Center with rotating exhibitions. Evergreen State College, northwest of Olympia, has a professionally curated gallery with rotating shows in the Dan Evans Library building. South of Olympia, Monarch Contemporary Art Center and Sculpture Park has an 80-acre sculpture garden and art gallery.

Each year, the Olympia Film Society (OFS) produces a film festival and fosters film and video education in Olympia. It also shows independent, classic, and international films year-round at the art-deco Capitol Theater. A mostly volunteer-powered organization, OFS supports and presents a variety of cultural events, including All Freakin' Night, an all-night horror film screening with a cult following.

=== Music ===
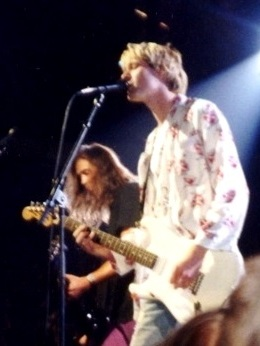
Nirvana got its start in the Olympia and Tacoma punk-rock scenes of the late 1980s; lead singer Kurt Cobain grew up in nearby Aberdeen.

Despite its relatively small population, Olympia is internationally known for its local music scene, particularly in the alternative rock and punk genres. It is most notable for its role in incubating the riot grrrl and grunge movements of the 1990s. The Olympia Music History Project formed in 2023 to research and document the area's music scene during the late 20th century, the peak of its influence.

Olympia has been a starting point or home for numerous bands that have achieved international recognition. Nirvana, among the most popular bands of the 20th century and known for popularizing the Pacific Northwest-based grunge genre, has roots in Olympia: lead singer Kurt Cobain lived in Olympia for several years during the band's rise to fame, and penned most songs on their bestselling album Nevermind while living there. Bikini Kill started the influential feminist punk movement riot grrrl in Olympia in 1990, as a counterpoint to grunge. Other prominent Olympia-based bands in the riot grrrl movement included Sleater-Kinney, named after a street in neighboring Lacey, Washington.

In addition, local alternative rock record labels K Records and Kill Rock Stars have played a significant role in shaping alternative rock and its subgenres. K Records, founded by musician Calvin Johnson, supported the early careers of Pacific Northwest artists including Modest Mouse and Phil Elverum. Kurt Cobain is said to have had a tattoo of Johnson's logo on his forearm. During its heyday, Johnson and his label earned the attention of Beck, then a rising star, who traveled to Olympia to record the collaborative album One Foot In The Grave with Johnson.

Kill Rock Stars, founded in Olympia shortly after K Records, got their start releasing Bikini Kill's first EP, and eventually grew into an indie label hosting the likes of Sleater-Kinney, Elliott Smith, and Xiu Xiu, among others.

Today, Olympia continues to play host to a strong local music scene, including several annual music festivals across various genres, including South Sound Block Party, Oly Funk Fest, and Olympia Old Time Music Festival.

The Fleetwoods, a popular 1950s and 1960s doo-wop group, whose hits included "Come Softly to Me" and "Mr. Blue", originated in Olympia. Black metal band Wolves in the Throne Room formed in the city in 2002.

=== Public art ===
In 2026, at the Olympia-Yashiro Friendship Bridge near Isthmus Park, a Coast Salish welcome figure called sk̓ʷuy ʔə ti həliʔil ('Mother of Restoration'), carved by Squaxin artist Andrea Wilbur-Sigo, was permanently installed. Other welcome figures in the city include an installation at Squaxin Park, known as "Steh-Chass Man", and a carving at South Puget Sound Community College titled, "Bigger".

== Parks and recreation ==
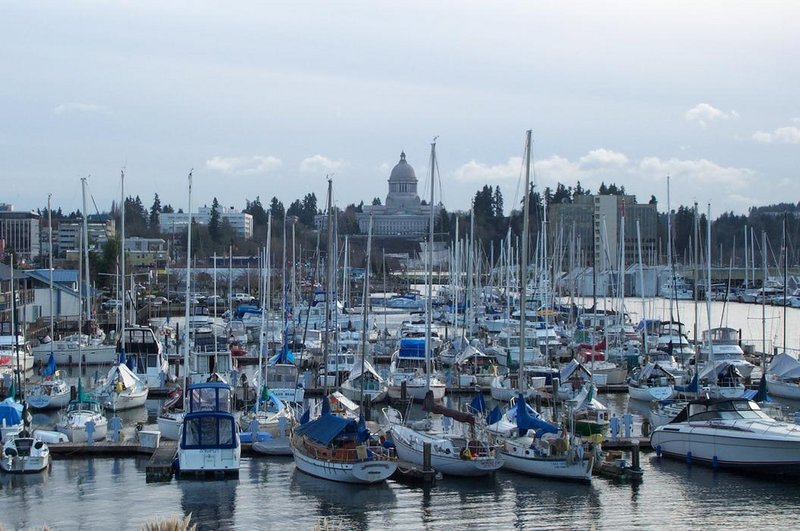
Percival Landing Park

Olympia has a wide array of public parks and nature conservation areas. Percival Landing Park is one of three city waterfront parks, located on the southern-most point of Puget Sound. It includes 0.9 miles (1.4 km) of boardwalk along Budd Inlet, as well as a playground, picnic areas, and a large open space. The boardwalk leads north to an open-air amphitheater, a viewing tower beside the Port of Olympia, as well as the Olympia Farmers' Market.

Sylvester Park is a historic block-sized park downtown, across from the Old Capitol Building. Capitol Lake near downtown and the Washington State Capitol offers several parks and walking trails.

Squaxin Park is a 314-acre park with an extensive trail system, playground and beach access. Additional developed parks in the city include Sunrise Park, Watershed Park and Woodruff Park. Neighborhood parks include Friendly Grove, located in a small eastside community, Trillium Park, which was created by the efforts of adjoining neighborhood associations, and Yauger Park, home to one of Olympia's public skate parks.

Protected areas such as the Nisqually National Wildlife Refuge are near Olympia, as are Burfoot Park, Capitol State Forest, and the Woodard Bay Natural Resources Conservation Area.

== Sports ==
The city is home to the Capital City Marathon which began in 1982, considered one of the oldest marathon events in the state. In May 1984, Olympia hosted the U.S. Olympic women's marathon trial under the auspices of the Capital City Marathon. The city had won a bid ahead of several larger U.S. cities. The winner of the event was Joan Benoit, who won a gold medal at the first women's Olympic marathon at the 1984 Summer Olympics later that year in Los Angeles.

Olympia is the home of the Oly Rollers, the local women's flat track roller derby league whose travel team, the Cosa Nostra Donnas, were the 2009 national champions of the Women's Flat Track Derby Association (WFTDA), winning the national Declaration of Derby tournament in Philadelphia, Pennsylvania.

FC Olympia (formerly the Oly Town Artesians) is an amateur soccer club that was founded in 2014 and primarily played at Black Hill High School. They field an amateur men's team in USL League Two and the Evergreen Premier League. The women's team was associated with the Northwest Premier League. As of 2024, the teams play their home matches at South Sound Stadium and the women's team plays in the USL W League.

== Education ==
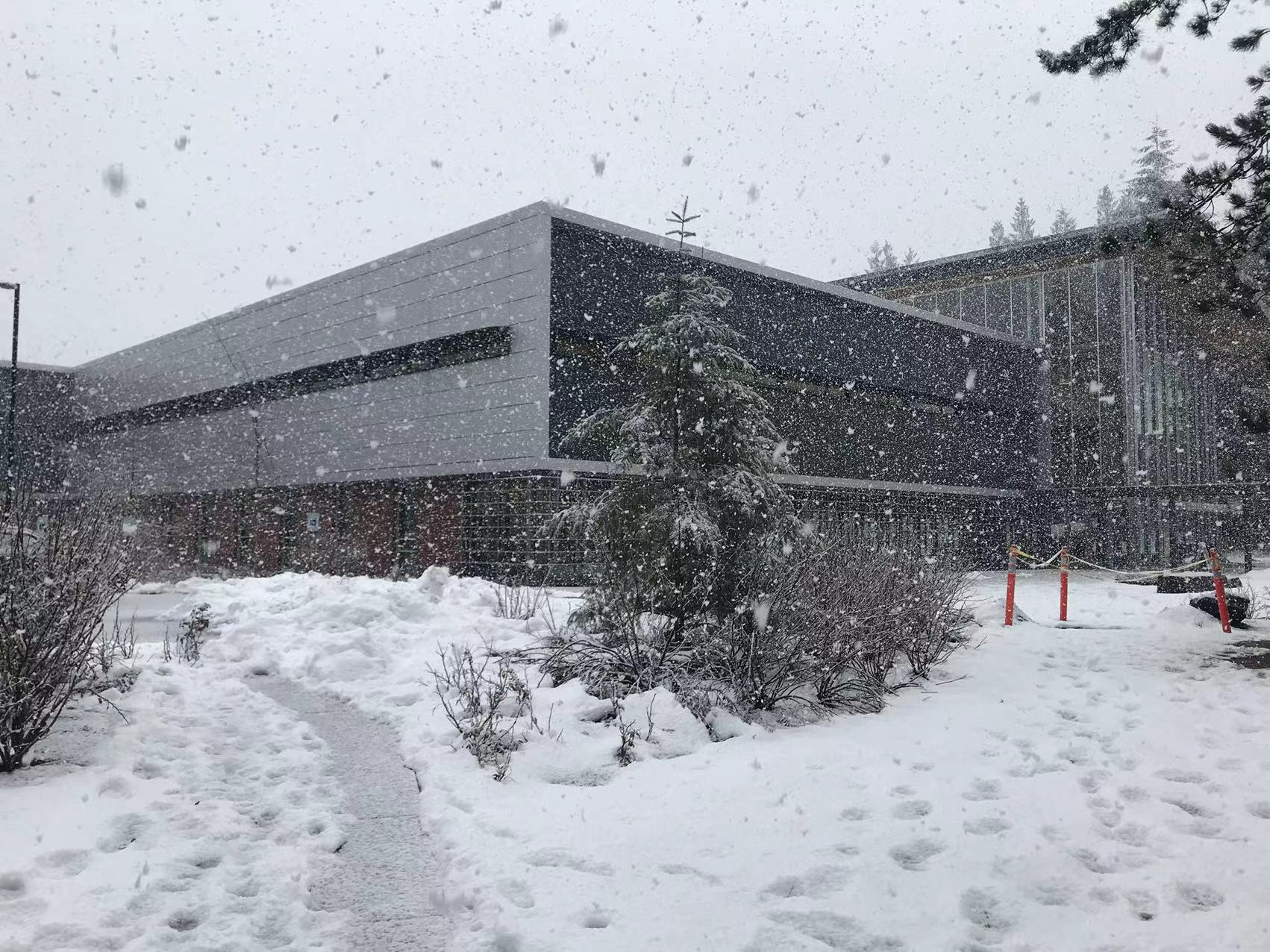
South Puget Sound Community College is a public community college in the city.

The majority of Olympia is located in the Olympia School District. It enrolled 9,782 students in K-12 in the 2021–22 school year. The district has a total of 18 schools: 11 elementary schools, four middle schools and three high schools. Its high schools are Olympia High School (formally known as William Winlock Miller High School), Capital High School, and Avanti High School.

Portions of Olympia are in the North Thurston Public Schools district and the Tumwater School District.

In the 2007–08 school year, Olympia began the Parent Partnership Program, which provides more opportunities to homeschooling families. Olympia's online high school, Olympia Regional Learning Academy (ORLA), is part of the same program. Private elementary schools include Olympia Waldorf School, Olympia Community School, St. Michael School, Holy Family, and Evergreen Christian. Private middle schools include Olympia Waldorf School and NOVA School. Pope John Paul II High School is a private high school.

In addition to primary and secondary schools, Olympia has a number of institutions of higher learning, namely The Evergreen State College and South Puget Sound Community College. The Evergreen State College, outside the city limits, offers bachelor's degrees in liberal arts and science, and master's degrees in environmental studies, public administration, education, and teaching. South Puget Sound Community College offers associate degrees in arts, science, biology, elementary education, pre-nursing, applied science, general studies, and business.

== Media ==
Journalism in Olympia dates to before Washington Territory's incorporation in 1853. The Olympian is the local daily newspaper. The Tacoma-based Weekly Volcano has covered Olympia entertainment since 2001. The statewide government channel TVW is based in Olympia. Online outlet NorthAmericaTalk, an aggregate for local community news and marketing, was established with headquarters in Olympia.

The progressive newspaper, Works in Progress, is based in Olympia. The independent news source, run by volunteers, released its first monthly issue in May 1990. The "alternative news" organization became an online-only platform in 2023, restarting its print publication in 2026.

Olympia and Thurston County are included in the Seattle-Tacoma designated market area (DMA), and therefore are chiefly served by Seattle's network-affiliated television stations and some radio stations. Since 1983, Olympia has had a public, educational and government access television station, which was rebranded in 2016 as Thurston Community Media. Olympia sits on the southern fringe of the FM signal of National Public Radio member station KUOW. An AM simulcast is transmitted from a tower in nearby Tumwater. Evergreen State College's KAOS broadcasts a mix of educational and political programming, with student-driven music shows.

== Transportation ==
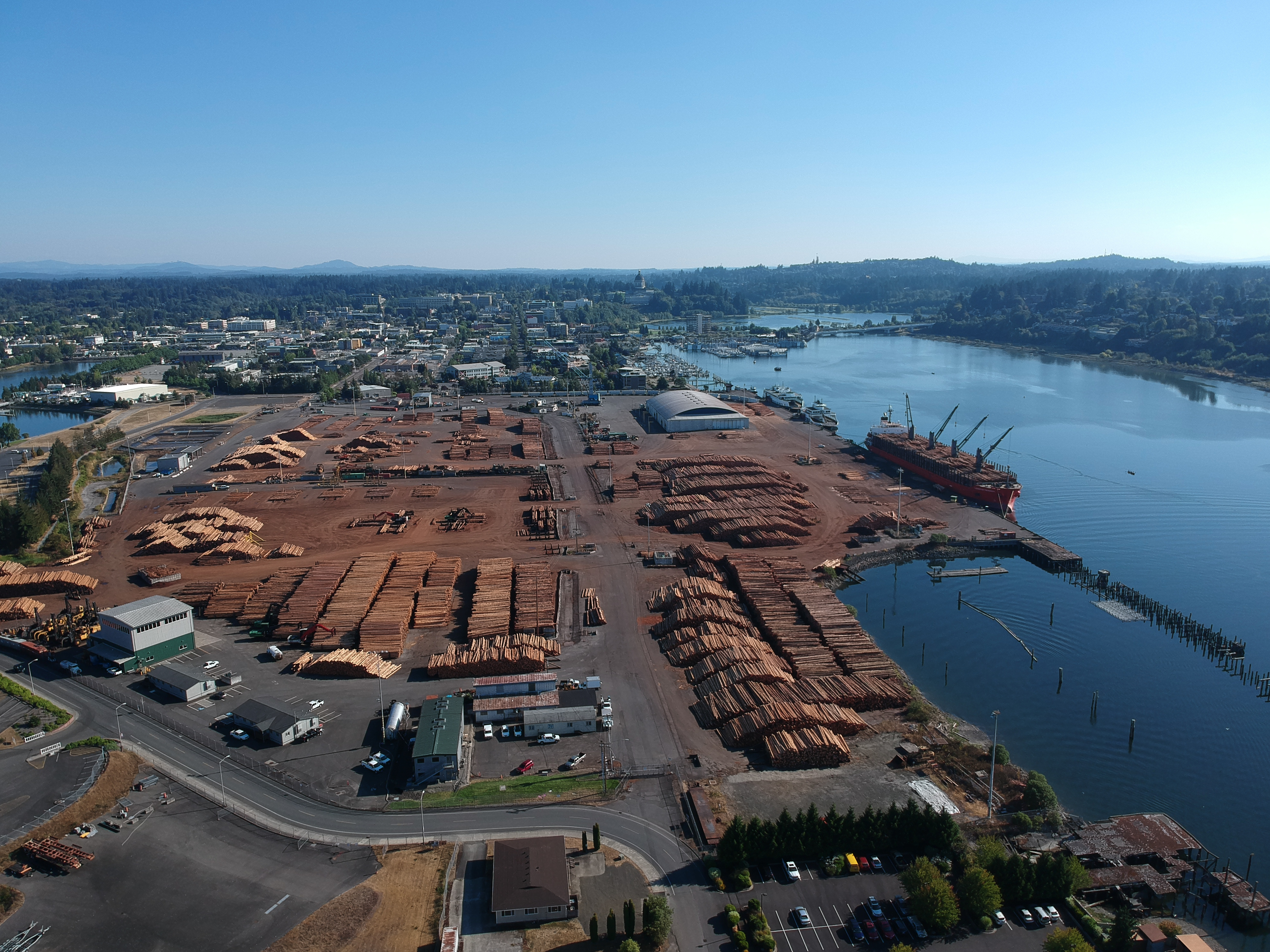
Port of Olympia

Interstate 5 is the main highway through Olympia and traverses the southern edge of downtown near the Capitol Campus. It continues south towards Portland, Oregon, and northeast to Tacoma and Seattle. In Tumwater, Interstate 5 intersects U.S. Route 101, which travels northwest across Olympia's outskirts and connects the city to the rest of the Olympic Peninsula and the Pacific Ocean. Olympia Regional Airport, located in Tumwater, is operated by the Port of Olympia and serves general aviation as well as corporate aviation. The airport hosts the Olympic Flight Museum and the Olympic AirShow, a local airshow that is held annually in June at the museum.

Public transit services in Olympia and surrounding areas are provided by Intercity Transit, a local system that is primarily financed by a sales tax. Olympia Transit Center is the main hub of the system and is also served by Grays Harbor Transit, the Mason Transit Authority, Lewis County Transit and intercity Greyhound and FlixBus buses. Intercity Transit also operates a prototype bus rapid transit service, the One, from Olympia to Lacey as well as connecting express service to Lakewood. All Intercity Transit services have been fare-free since 2020 as part of a demonstration program. As of 2021, Olympia is among the top 50 metropolitan areas in the United States for public transit ridership per capita and is tied with Phoenix with 14.1 riders per capita.

Amtrak provides intercity train service to the Olympia–Lacey area at Centennial Station, which is staffed by volunteers. It is served by the daily Coast Starlight from Los Angeles and the San Francisco Bay Area and more frequent Amtrak Cascades trains that operate from Portland to Seattle and Vancouver, British Columbia. In the early 21st century, several organizations have proposed the start of an intercity passenger-only ferry service to connect Olympia to Seattle and other areas on Puget Sound.

== Notable people ==
- Lynda Barry, cartoonist
- Kurt Cobain, musician in Nirvana
- Rachel Corrie, peace activist
- Carrie Brownstein, musician in Sleater-Kinney, actress and comedian known for Portlandia
- Kimya Dawson, singer-songwriter and member of the Moldy Peaches
- Dan Erickson, playwright and producer
- Matt Groening, creator of The Simpsons
- Kathleen Hanna, musician in Bikini Kill, leader of the 1990s riot grrrl feminist punk movement
- Christopher Hedrick, entrepreneur
- Donald Hume, American rower who won Olympic gold at the 1936 Summer Olympics.
- Geoff Jenkins, Major League Baseball outfielder
- Calvin Johnson, musician in Beat Happening, founder of Olympia-based record label K Records
- Rickie Lee Jones, Grammy-winning musician
- Kasey Keller, US soccer goalkeeper
- Peter Kennedy, five-time national champion and 1952 Winter Olympics silver medalist in pairs figure skating
- Scott LaValla, USA Rugby player
- Jim Lynch, writer
- Nikki McClure, artist
- Sam Miller, comedian
- William Henry Mitchell, pioneer and sheriff
- Roland S. Morris (1874–1945), U.S. ambassador to Japan.
- Eloise Mumford - actress
- Colin O'Brady, endurance athlete and mountain climber
- Don Rich, lead guitarist for Buck Owens
- Gary Toxel, member of the Fleetwoods
- Unwound, a post-hardcore punk band formed in Olympia
- Aaron and Nathan Weaver, members of the band, Wolves in the Throne Room

== International relations ==
Olympia is twinned with:

- Katō, Hyōgo, Japan

A previous sister city agreement with Olympia, Greece, is no longer in effect. An attempt to create a sister city partnership with Rafah, Palestine, was rejected by the city council in 2007.

On December 12, 2023, the City Council passed a resolution calling for an "immediate and permanent ceasefire" during the Israeli–Palestinian conflict. Furthermore, the city recognized the right of existence of both the Palestinian and Israeli states.

== See also ==
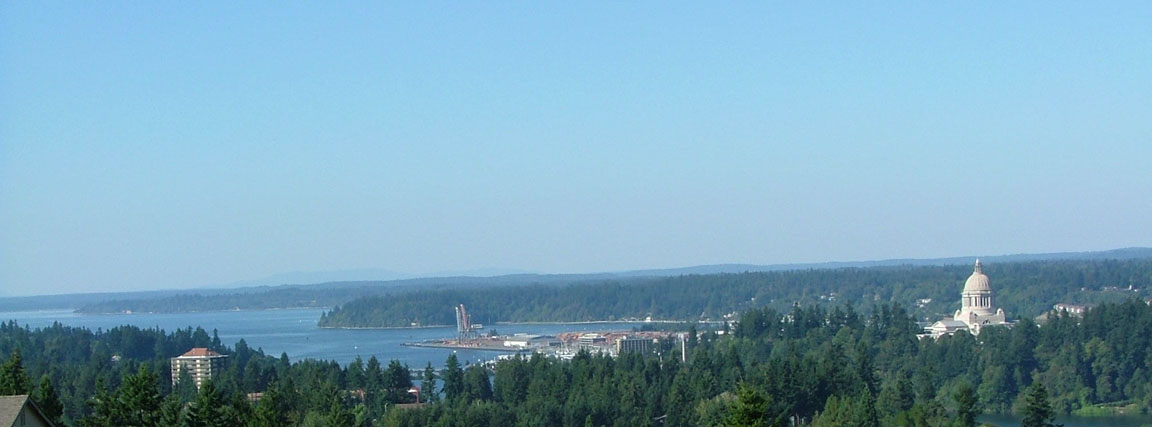
View from Tumwater Hill

- Bigelow House – historic house museum
- Capitol Lakefair – Annual summer festival
- Capital City Pride – Community LGBT festival
- Freechild Institute for Youth Engagement – Nonprofit organization
- USS Olympia, 2 ships
