= Capital City Pride =

Annual LGBT event in Olympia, Washington

- Poster for 2008 Capital City Pride
- Genre: Pride parade and festival
- Frequency: Annual
- Location: Olympia, Washington
- Founded: 1991
- Area: South Puget Sound, Washington
- Filing status: 501(c)(3)
- Website: http://www.capitalcitypride.net

Capital City Pride in Olympia, Washington is a non-profit organization that hosts LGBTQ events, the largest of which is the annual two-day Capital City Pride festival and parade, held in June. The festival draws about 15,000 people each year.

== Operations ==
The Olympia Pride festival and rally are hosted to celebrate the LGBT communities; to honor civil rights gains in the past year and to highlight youth activists and honor long-time activists for their commitments. Entertainment and the pride parade are highlights of the day. The Olympia Pride festival has grown over the years and now approximately 12,000 to 15,000 people attend the contemporary pride festivals. The festival is funded through private fundraising and sponsorship, grants and tourism promotion funds.

The organization annual budget is approximately $40,000.

== History ==
=== Organization ===
Capital City Pride began as a grass roots organization in 1991. By 2000, it began to operate under the auspices of the Olympia Rainbow Center while operating as an independent group with a committee and elected officers. The organization expanded their marketing and sponsorship work in 2007 and 2008.

Since 2020 the organization has been under new management and is slowly transitioning to become OLYWA PRIDE.

=== Pride Day in Olympia ===
Prior to 1990, Pride parades were held in the relative safety of large cities. In 1991, Olympia become the first small town outside of Seattle to host a Pride event. The initial group of organizers included Evergreen State College students Vikki Marinelli, Tod Streater, Kelly Hawk and Judith Samuels and community-based people Sid Evans and Michael Murphy, and Anna Schlecht. Together, their efforts produced the first Olympia Pride March that lead from Marathon Park and ended with a rally at the State Capital, drawing a crowd of over 300 people.

The 1992 Pride Rally and march were organized by a new group of organizers whose efforts were chronicled in a documentary titled, "Small Town Pride" produced by Olympia-based film maker Marilyn Freeman. By 1993, Capital City Pride was founded with the sole purpose of hosting the annual Pride events.

Over time the march's more political tone shifted a more celebratory one.

Traditionally, The Capital City Pride parade and festival was held on a Saturday, but was moved to Sunday in 2007. In 2010, the festival grew to two full days.

In 2016, the annual Pride Parade in downtown Olympia drew over 20,000 spectators, many of whom were first-time attendees who came to show their support of the LGBT community following the Orlando massacre.
