= Port of Olympia =

Deepwater port in Puget Sound, Washington state

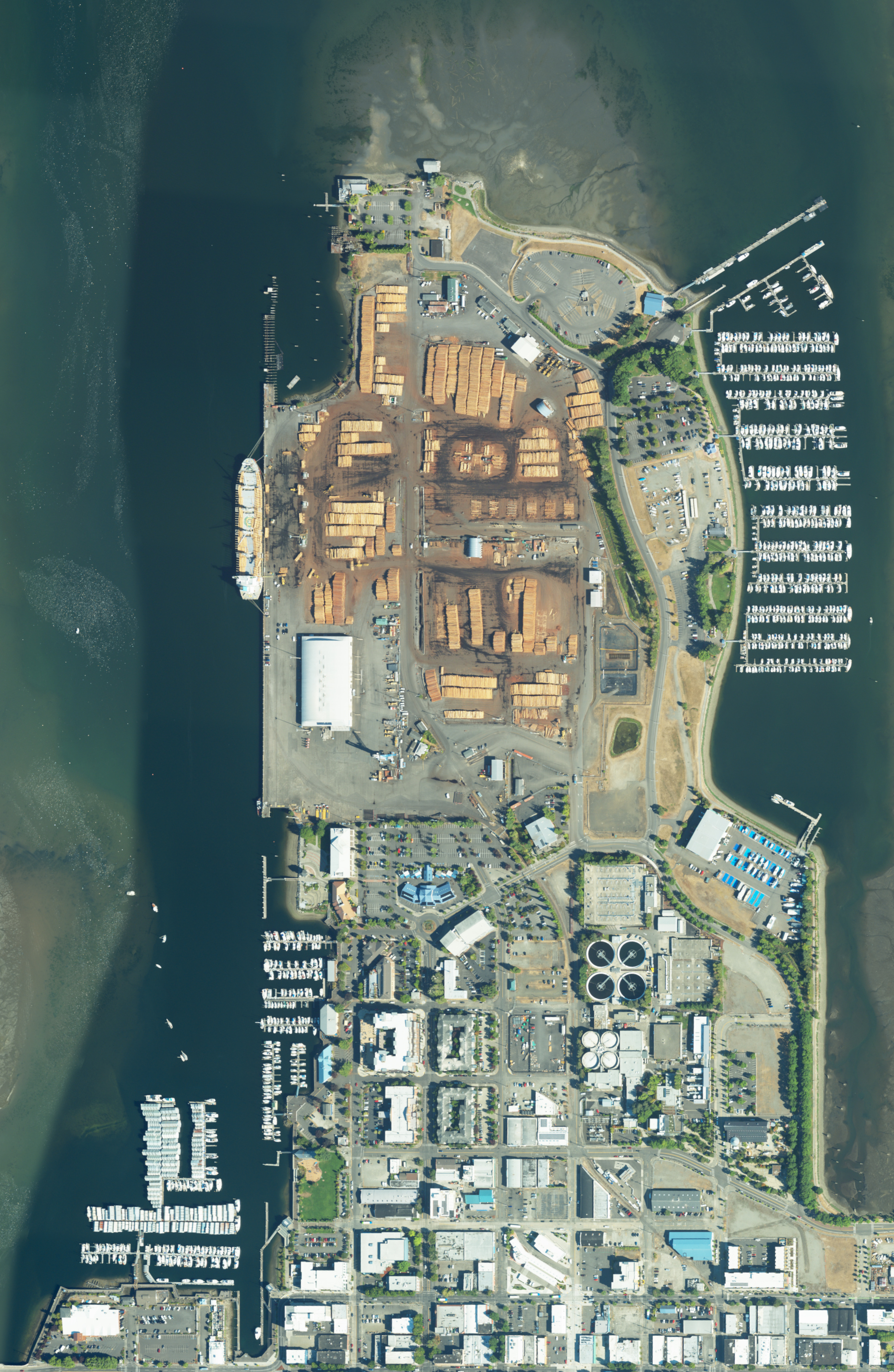
- Port of Olympia, August 2023
- Interactive map of Port of Olympia

Location
- Location: Olympia, Thurston County, Washington
- Coordinates: 47°02′57″N 122°54′12″W

Details
- Opened: November 7, 1922
- Type of Harbor: Deepwater port
- Employees: 48

Statistics
- Vessel arrivals: 19 (2024)
- Annual cargo tonnage: 540,000 metric tons (540,000 t) (2024)
- Annual revenue: $1.95 million (2025)
- Net income: $570,000 (2024)
- Budget: $19.9 million (2023)
- Revenue per ship: $150,000 (2024)
- Website portofolympia.com

The Port of Olympia is a deepwater port and port of entry located on a Budd Inlet peninsula in Olympia, Washington. It is the southernmost port within Puget Sound. The port is also a district and authority, containing holdings that include Olympia Airport, the Olympia Market District, the NewMarket Industrial Campus, and the Swantown Marina.

The port was officially begun in 1922 after a citizen's vote authorized the construction of a waterfront industrial area. Prior to the build of the port, the area was used by indigenous people and early non-native settlers for commerce and trade. By 1850, an early harbor site was formed, leading to economic and population increases in Olympia, which became an end point on the Oregon Trail and the government seat for the Washington Territory. A lengthy wharf was built in 1885, and the inlet was dredged in 1895 to provide shipment access for larger cargo vessels to the city. Further expansions were undertaken in the 1900s, and in the 1910s the waterfront became a site of canneries and warship construction.

The port was built up during the mid-1920s to include a terminal, and timber cargo became the main economic driver of the industrial site; canneries became a financial factor in the 1950s. Expansions of the grounds and facilities continued up to World War II, once again being used to fabricate ships for the war effort. The port authority began to expand operations by purchasing the airport and other property beginning in the 1960s. Channels around the Marine Terminal were deepened in 1970. In conjunction with additional expansions of the port in the 1980s, the authority diversified the port's holdings further, allowing the creation of new businesses, neighborhoods, and parks in the 1990s.

By 2010, the Port of Olympia ranked second in the state for lumber cargo and as of 2025, the port is approximately 200 acres (81 ha) in size, including the 60-acre (24 ha) Marine Terminal. The authority has land holdings exceeding 1,200 acres (490 ha). As of 2025, the port averages 20 ship calls per year and generates an annual revenue of almost $2.0 million.

== History ==
=== Early maritime commerce in Olympia ===
Maritime commerce in the waters near Olympia began under the Coast Salish people, using the bays and inlets as a form of navigation and trade amongst other indigenous tribes. Fur trappers under the Hudson's Bay Company and non-native settlers, as well as military and agricultural interests, began using the lower Puget Sound during the 1800s. A "pioneer harbor" at Budd Inlet was formed, and the first known commercial vessel, the Orbit, arrived from San Francisco in 1850 to deliver wood products. The economic boon allowed the early community to grow, leading to Olympia being considered the terminus for the Oregon Trail and in 1853, the territorial seat for the Washington Territory. The first collection district and custom house for Puget Sound ships was established in the city thereafter.

=== Beginnings of the Port of Olympia ===
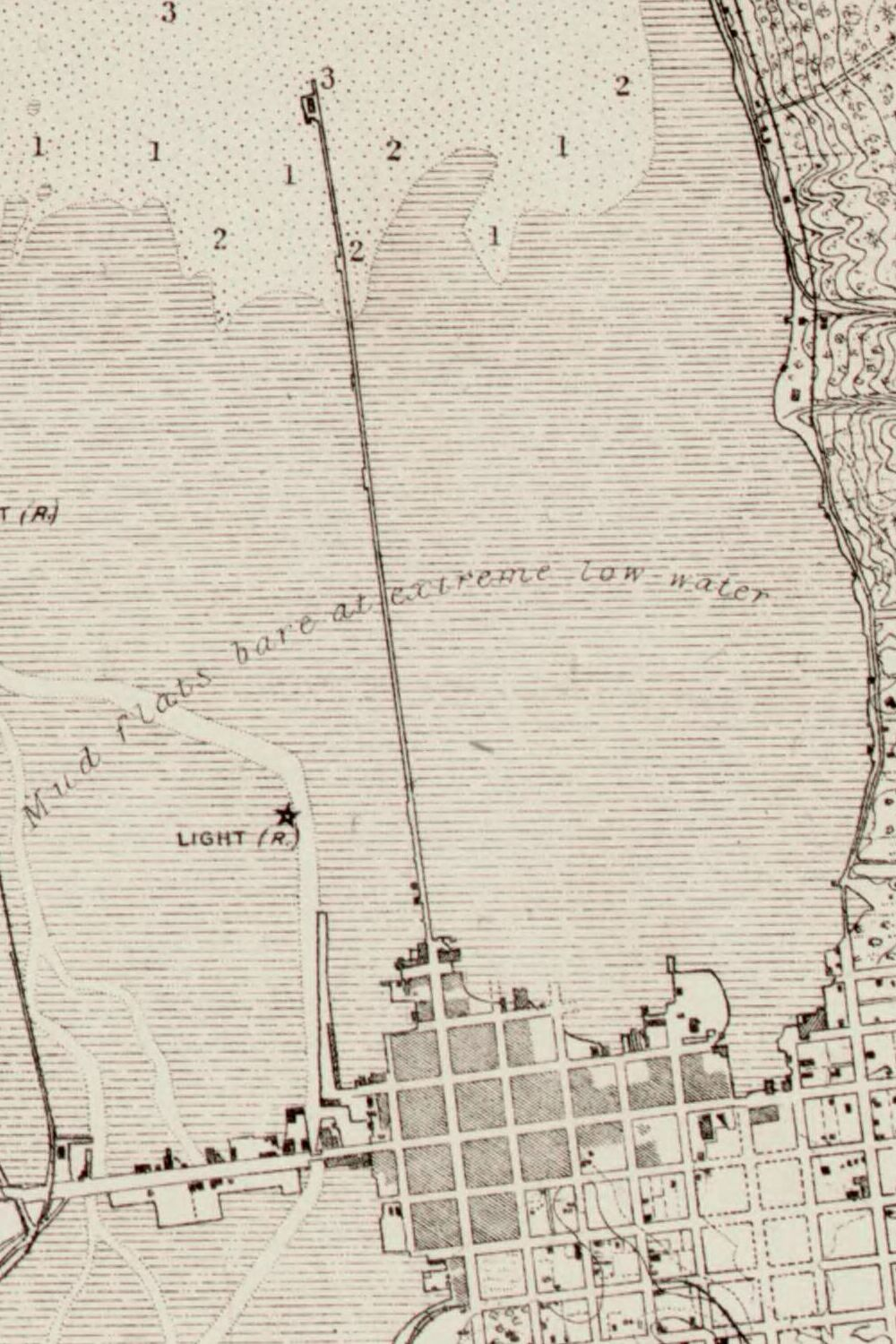
Downtown and Port area in June 1892

A wharf spanning 4,798 feet (1,462.4 m) was constructed in 1885 off present-day Capitol Way, used until a dredging of the inlet in 1895 by the United States Army Corps of Engineers. The excavation allowed more navigability for larger ships, including the Mosquito Fleet and industrial cargo operations. Additional dredging took place during a large effort to create deeper channels, while producing fill to expand the city footprint, between 1909 and 1911. Economics and prosperity was noted to increase further, creating a waterfront industrial site. The waterfront became home to the Olympia Ship Building Company which built warships during World War I, and the first cannery, Olympia Canning Company, opened in 1915.

Official support to create a port in Olympia began in early 1922 and voters in Thurston County approved the organization of a port authority in the city on November 7, 1922. The first board of commissioners were prominent businessmen Fred Stocking, James L. Mosman, and P. F. Knight.

Timber became the port's economic staple during the early years of the port, exporting 298 million board feet of lumber during the late 1920s. The waterfront expanded to include numerous factories and mills, as well as another cannery. A 30 foot (9.1 m) deep, 250 ft × 1,000 ft (76 m × 305 m) channel was dredged in 1924 and the first dock was completed in 1925. Storage infrastructure were added during the Great Depression and pilings were replaced by a series of wharves and dikes. The first labor union was formed in 1933. Known at the time as the Local 38-89 of the International Longshoremen's Association, it continues under the moniker, Local No. 47, in the present-day.

=== Port economics and expansion era, 20th century ===
The Port of Olympia became known as a "weekend port." Under the allowance of the union, ships and cargo could be loaded during the weekends which allowed for record-setting operational records. The port and its facilities were expanded during World War II and the fabrication of naval vessels for the war effort was undertaken. The waterfront returned to its financial bread-and-butter, timber products, during the postwar years, amassing shipments totaling over 160 million board feet in 1957. Canneries for fruit and vegetables became a larger part of the port's operations during the 1950s.

In 1960, one of the oldest licensed radio stations in the country, KGY, moved operations to the northern section of the port facilities on the peninsula. The section was undergoing a revitalization effort, and port commissioners expected the station's relocation to improve on the "grimy" nature of the industrial area, hoping to bring in more attractive businesses as property values increased. The KGY office was built on a waterfront pier overlooking Budd Inlet and once featured an AM radio tower. Signing a 50-year lease originally at $25 per month, the station has remained after a new agreement was signed in 2009.

Expanding its financial holdings in the 1960s, the port purchased the Olympia Airport in 1963 including an adjoining 700-acre (280 ha) parcel to expand economic development in the region. An industrial district was begun on the parcel a few years later; it's known in the present-day as the NewMarket Industrial Campus. The original port area was at full capacity in the late 1960s, and the authority expanded operations once again, purchasing tidal lands on the Budd Inlet peninsula at East Bay. Portions of the land were set aside by the port, becoming a recreational marina known then as the East Bay Marina. It was completed in the early 1980s and under oversight of the port since 1987, known in the present-day as Swantown Marina.

The port authority, in conjunction with the Port of Tacoma, attempted to expand operations beginning in 1965 for a deepwater port located at the Nisqually Delta. The authority also proposed the building of an aluminum plant at the site in 1967. The projects were waylaid after fierce opposition from numerous groups and organizations, such as the Nisqually Tribe, over environmental concerns of the potential port. By 1970, the state determined a port at the site could not co-exist with the natural area of the delta. In 1974, the proposed industrial site became a protected preserve, the Nisqually National Wildlife Refuge. The terminal, known as Marine Terminal, was deepened in 1970, allowing heavier and larger cargo ships access to the waterfront.

In 1970, the port authority formed the Port of Olympia Harbor Patrol (POHP), a volunteer service that provides assistance to boats and aquatic recreational crafts in the East and West Bays of Budd Inlet. Working in conjunction with other emergency service and law enforcement agencies, such as the United States Coast Guard, the POHP also conducts as a safety and security operation. The POHP had been under the management of the city of Olympia up until 2015, transferring oversight to the port after a lack of funding. The patrol unit, which does not have authority to enforce laws, is planned to be transferred under the oversight of the Thurston County Sheriff’s Marine Services Unit. The effort, deemed necessary as the POHP "does not align" with the port's long-term goals, was officially announced in December 2025.

During the 1980s, a 76,000-square-foot (7,100 m^{2}) a warehouse was built at the terminal, and the airport and industrial campus were improved due in part to an infrastructure project allowing easier access to Interstate 5. Efforts in the 1990s to diversify the port's holdings and planning allowed the campus, marina, and waterfront to expand with a variety of businesses, new neighborhoods, and recreational areas.

=== 21st century ===
An eco-terrorist group took credit for an intentional fire set in May 2000 at a modular office building of two lumber companies on port grounds. No injuries were reported, and damages to the leveled structure were assessed at $200,000.

In January 2009, during a phase of increased prosperity for the port, Weyerhaeuser began the shipment of logs from Olympia after having moved their operations from the Port of Tacoma. The Port of Olympia was ranked the second largest terminal for log shipping in the region by 2010. In a multi-partnership effort in the 2010s, the port began a renewal project that funded, expanded, or restored port holdings around the inlet for educational and recreational purposes, which includes the city's Hands On Children's Museum at East Bay Plaza.

An electric-powered hydrofoil ferry service was proposed in 2025. Connecting to Des Moines, Washington, the proposal has been one of several attempts to include a ferry service to the lower Puget Sound region, with a failed bill for a state-funded study of such in 2018.

The port joined the Maritime Industrial Base Coalition under the Washington Public Ports Association in March 2026. Meant to increase the competitiveness of the Puget Sound shipbuilding industry, the Port of Olympia, lacking an active shipyard, is expected to benefit in terms of replacing an aging workforce in the maritime sector.

The authority became host to a fan zone for the 2026 World Cup located at the Port Plaza waterfront, also known as the port's NorthPoint property near Swantown Marina. Visitors viewed live feeds of several games during the first week of the tournament and each day encompassed a different theme that included various forms of cuisine and entertainment. Known as the Olympia-Lacey Fan Zone, between 2,800 and 3,000 people were recorded as paid-attendees on opening day, June 19. (Note: The Olympia-Lacey Fan Zone was the only 2026 World Cup fan zone held in the state to charge a fee. A minimum entrance charge was $10.) Total attendance for the fan zone was listed at 7,700 and included visitors from other states and such countries as Egypt, Finland, and Kenya.

== Port management and oversight ==
The Port of Olympia is designated as a port of entry by the U.S. Customs Service.

== Properties ==
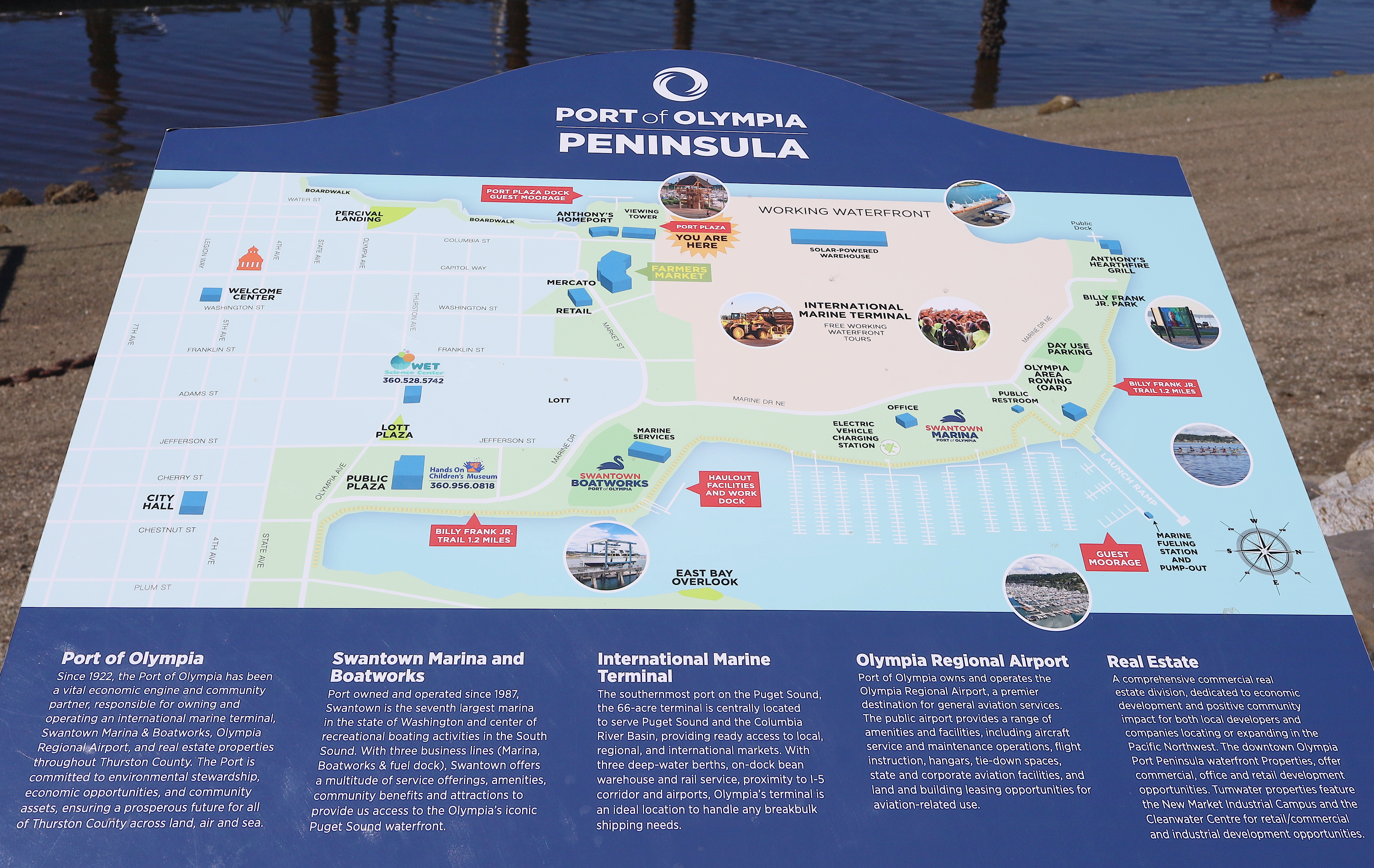
Port interpretive panel map, 2025

The Port of Olympia, the southernmost open water port on Puget Sound, consists of the city's Marine Terminal, an office for real estate transactions with the authority, the NewMarket Industrial Campus, the Olympia Market District on the inlet peninsula, Olympia Regional Airport, and the Swantown Marina and Boatworks. The Olympia port is one of 11 deep draft ports in the state.

The Marine Terminal spans over 60 acres (24 ha) on the port's approximately 200-acre (81 ha) holdings in south Puget Sound. It includes a terminal for cargo containers with 23 acres (93,000 m^{2}) of storage space and 25 acres (100,000 m^{2}) of commercial space. Handling various types of cargo such as timber and wind energy equipment, the terminal contains three deep water berths, a rail line on the dock, a U.S. Customs bonded warehouse, and a "specialty cargo" container yard.

The Swantown Marina is home to several waterfront recreation areas and provides moorage and boat maintenance and repair services. It contains a fuel dock and a 200 foot (61 m) work dock.

Several state government agencies, and the Olympic Flight Museum, are located at the airport and industrial campus. Along with programs and businesses associated with airflight, the area is also home to the Tumwater School District and Timberland Regional Library. As of 2011 the airport was 835 acres (338 ha) in size; the NewMarket campus was listed at 440 acres (180 ha).

Restaurants and retail stores dominate the Olympia Market District which is also the location of the city's farmers market.

=== Public art and exhibits ===
An historic tugboat, known as the Parthia, was installed as a display located near to the Olympia Farmers Market and the port's main entrance. The 50 foot (15 m) vessel was constructed in 1906 and was a harbor tug in Olympia for 35 years. The tugboat was restored by the South Sound Maritime Heritage Association (SSMHA) beginning in 2017 at the port's Swantown Boatworks. The Parthia is planned to be part of a larger maritime history exhibit.

== Economics and employment ==
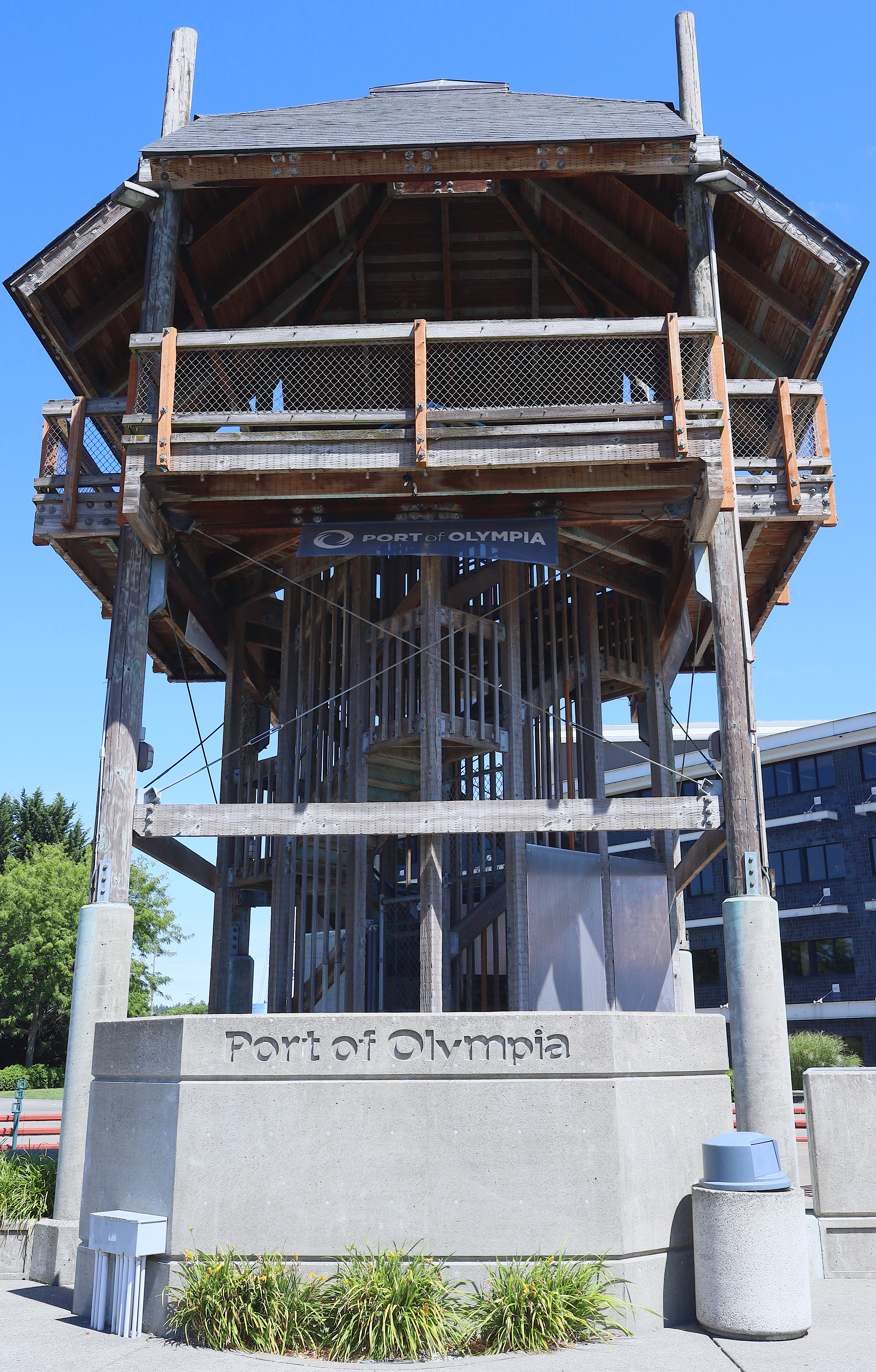
Public viewing tower at Port Plaza, 2025

In the early 1990s, the Port of Olympia took the lead to begin the formation of the South Puget Sound Foreign Trade Zone, a conglomerate between itself and ports and industrial parks in Kitsap, Lewis, and Mason counties. The partnership was considered the first in the United States to encompass as many agencies over such a large region.

Employment related to the port rose from over 5,100 jobs in 2004 to approximately 7,200 jobs by 2009. During the same time span, associated revenue more than doubled, from almost $430 million to $1.1 billion.

As of 2023, the Port of Olympia had approximately 48 employees; it had an operating budget of $17.33 million and a capital budget of $2.57 million. ILWU Local 47 provides staffing for marine terminal operations.

In 2024, the port profited about $570,000 and received 19 "ship calls" for timber-related cargo; four were for wood pulp and the remainder were timber logs. A total handling of 540,000 metric tons (540,000 t) of cargo was also recorded for the year with an average revenue per ship at approximately $150,000, an increase up from $68,000 just three years prior. Timber cargo has been noted to be in slight decline at the terminal, averaging an annual rate over the marine port's history between 20 and 24 vessels. In mid-2025, $1.95 million in revenue had been recorded. Most earnings at the port are raised by rent of port property to tenants.

== See also ==
- Port Militarization Resistance
