= National Register of Historic Places listings in Thurston County, Washington =

Location of Thurston County in Washington

This is a list of the National Register of Historic Places listings in Thurston County, Washington.

This is intended to be a complete list of the properties and districts on the National Register of Historic Places in Thurston County, Washington, United States. Latitude and longitude coordinates are provided for many National Register properties and districts; these locations may be seen together in an online map.

There are 68 properties and districts listed on the National Register in the county.

This National Park Service list is complete through NPS recent listings posted October 9, 2026.

== Current listings ==
	Name on the Register	Image	Date listed	Location	City or town	Description
1	Allen House Hotel	Allen House Hotel	June 17, 1987 (#87000872)	114-118 N. Jefferson; 47°02′45″N 122°53′48″W	Olympia	Built in 1891, the building is now known as the Jefferson Apartments.
2	American Legion Hall	American Legion Hall	June 17, 1987 (#87000871)	219 W. Legion Way; 47°02′35″N 122°54′08″W	Olympia	
3	Daniel R. Bigelow House	Daniel R. Bigelow House	August 7, 1979 (#79002562)	918 Glass St; 47°03′00″N 122°53′23″W	Olympia	Built in 1854.
4	Black Lake School	Black Lake School	May 10, 1990 (#90000709)	6000 Black Lake Blvd. SW. 46°59′39″N 122°59′10″W	Olympia	
5	Capital Boulevard Crossing	Capital Boulevard Crossing	July 16, 1982 (#82004300)	Spans Deschutes River; 47°00′50″N 122°54′07″W	Tumwater	
6	Capital Savings and Loan Association	Capital Savings and Loan Association	July 23, 2018 (#100002706)	425 Franklin St. 47°02′40″N 122°53′57″W	Olympia	
7	Chamber's Prairie-Ruddell Pioneer Cemetery	Chamber's Prairie-Ruddell Pioneer Cemetery	June 30, 1995 (#95000803)	Jct. of Ruddell and Mullen Rds., NW corner 47°00′34″N 122°48′23″W	Lacey	
8	Cloverfields	Cloverfields	May 22, 1978 (#78002779)	1100 Carlyon Ave., SE; 47°01′15″N 122°53′06″W	Olympia	Built in 1914.
9	Colvin House	Colvin House	June 23, 1988 (#88000693)	16828 Old Hwy. 99; 46°49′54″N 122°53′23″W	Tenino	
10	Delphi School	Delphi School	July 19, 1990 (#90001075)	7601 SW. Delphi Rd. 46°58′47″N 123°01′07″W	Delphi	
11	Dofflemyer Point Light	Dofflemyer Point Light	May 1, 1995 (#93001339)	211 NE. 73rd 47°08′26″N 122°54′26″W	Boston Harbor	
12	Elks Building	Elks Building	April 21, 1988 (#88000690)	607-613 S. Capitol Way; 47°02′34″N 122°54′02″W	Olympia	Built in 1920.
13	Jonas and Maria Lovisa Erickson Farmstead	Jonas and Maria Lovisa Erickson Farmstead	March 20, 2002 (#02000251)	13121 Independence Rd. 46°47′43″N 123°09′14″W	Rochester	
14	Funk House	Funk House	May 8, 1987 (#87000691)	1202 E. Olympia Ave. 47°02′53″N 122°53′14″W	Olympia	
15	Gate School	Gate School	July 19, 1990 (#90001094)	16925 Moon Rd. SW. 46°50′19″N 123°08′17″W	Gate	
16	General Administration Building	General Administration Building	March 8, 2007 (#07000134)	210 11th Ave. SW; 47°02′17″N 122°54′08″W	Olympia	Built in 1954.
17	Georgia-Pacific Plywood Company Office	Georgia-Pacific Plywood Company Office	March 9, 2007 (#07000135)	600 Capitol Way N. 47°03′02″N 122°54′01″W	Olympia	Built in 1952.
18	Calvin and Pamela Hale House	Calvin and Pamela Hale House	January 12, 1984 (#84003632)	902 Tullis St., NE; 47°03′07″N 122°53′00″W	Olympia	Built in 1882.
19	Jaaska House and Warehouse	Jaaska House and Warehouse	June 23, 1988 (#88000702)	11300 Independence Rd. 46°48′27″N 123°07′21″W	Rochester	
20	Jeffers Studio	Jeffers Studio	June 17, 1987 (#87000870)	500 and 502 S. Washington; 47°02′39″N 122°53′57″W	Olympia	Built in 1913.
21	Johnson House	Johnson House	June 23, 1988 (#88000695)	19540 Johnson Rd. 46°47′53″N 122°26′43″W	Yelm	
22	Lackamas School	Lackamas School	May 10, 1990 (#90000707)	16240, 16312 Bald Hill Rd. SE. 46°51′04″N 122°29′09″W	Yelm	
23	Long Lake Recreation Hall	Long Lake Recreation Hall	June 23, 1988 (#88000697)	3054 Carpenter Rd., SE; 47°01′13″N 122°47′05″W	Lacey	Formally known as Heritage Hall, the log building was built in the 1930s by either the Civilian Conservation Corps or the Works Progress Administration. The site became the beginning of the Thurston County Fairgrounds in the 1950s.
24	C. J. Lord Mansion	C. J. Lord Mansion	May 7, 1981 (#81000591)	211 W. 21st Ave. 47°01′48″N 122°54′03″W	Olympia	Built in 1923; home to the Washington State Capital Museum
25	LOTUS (motor vessel)	LOTUS (motor vessel)	May 18, 1987 (#87000715)	Fiddlehead Marina, B Dock; 47°02′58″N 122°54′12″W	Olympia	
26	Henry McCleary House	Henry McCleary House	October 2, 1978 (#78002780)	111 21st Ave. SW; 47°02′N 122°54′W	Olympia	
27	Meyer House	Meyer House	February 21, 1985 (#85000351)	1136 E. Bay Dr. 47°03′17″N 122°53′30″W	Olympia	
28	Miller-Brewer House	Miller-Brewer House	June 23, 1988 (#88000694)	17915 Guava; 46°49′41″N 123°00′18″W	Rochester	
29	Millersylvania State Park	Millersylvania State Park	September 16, 2009 (#09000732)	12245 Tilley Rd. 46°54′42″N 122°54′22″W	Olympia	
30	Mottman Building	Mottman Building	June 16, 1983 (#83003354)	101-105 N. Capitol Way; 47°02′42″N 122°54′02″W	Olympia	Built in 1890
31	National Guard Armory - Olympia	National Guard Armory - Olympia	May 19, 2025 (#100011856)	515 Eastside Street SE; 47°02′40″N 122°53′19″W	Olympia	
32	Nisqually School	Nisqually School	August 23, 1990 (#90001248)	341 Nisqually Cut-Off Rd. SE; 47°03′42″N 122°42′35″W	Nisqually	
33	Old Capitol Building	Old Capitol Building	May 30, 1975 (#75001877)	600 block Washington St. 47°02′35″N 122°53′53″W	Olympia	Built in 1892
34	Olympia Downtown Historic District	Olympia Downtown Historic District	September 15, 2004 (#04001008)	Roughly bounded by State Ave., 8th Ave., Columbia St., and Franklin St. 47°22′32″N 122°53′59″W	Olympia	
35	Olympia National Bank	Olympia National Bank	June 17, 1987 (#87000869)	422 South Capitol Way; 47°02′39″N 122°54′04″W	Olympia	Built in 1915.
36	Olympia Public Library	Olympia Public Library	August 3, 1982 (#82004299)	S. Franklin and E. 7th 47°02′34″N 122°53′50″W	Olympia	Built in 1914.
37	Tugboat Parthia	Tugboat Parthia	December 18, 2023 (#100009615)	650 Marina Drive; 47°03′05″N 122°53′47″W	Olympia	
38	Charles Patnude House	Charles Patnude House	May 22, 1978 (#78002781)	1239 8th Ave. 47°02′33″N 122°53′01″W	Olympia	Built in 1893.
39	Radio Station KGY	Radio Station KGY	October 25, 2024 (#100010925)	1700 Marine Drive NE; 47°03′32″N 122°54′14″W	Olympia	
40	Rainier School	Rainier School	March 10, 2004 (#04000159)	Jct. of Algyers St. and Centre Sts. 46°53′19″N 122°41′14″W	Rainier	The schoolhouse was built in 1915. Purchased by the city of Rainier in 1995, the building was used for various purposes. The school was restored in 2017 and is used as an office space for the Rainier School District.
41	Reinhart-Young House	Reinhart-Young House	May 8, 1987 (#87000712)	1106 E. Olympia Ave. 47°02′52″N 122°53′21″W	Olympia	Also known as Byrd House.
42	L. N. Rice House	L. N. Rice House	September 23, 1988 (#88000700)	12247 Vail Rd., SE; 46°54′34″N 122°34′20″W	Yelm	
43	Rochester Elementary School	Rochester Elementary School	May 17, 1990 (#90000784)	10140 US 12 SW. 46°49′21″N 123°05′42″W	Rochester	
44	Frank Rudkin House	Frank Rudkin House	May 8, 1987 (#87000713)	1005 E. Olympia Ave. 47°02′50″N 122°53′18″W	Olympia	
45	Salsich Lumber Company Superintendent's House	Salsich Lumber Company Superintendent's House	June 23, 1988 (#88000696)	10808 Vail Rd. 46°55′48″N 122°33′41″W	Yelm	
46	SAND MAN (Tug Boat)	SAND MAN (Tug Boat)	August 6, 1998 (#98001018)	Berth A-108, East Bay Marina Port of Olympia; 47°01′25″N 122°53′00″W	Olympia	
47	F. W. Schmidt House	F. W. Schmidt House	June 30, 1995 (#95000801)	2831 Orange; 47°01′25″N 122°53′00″W	Olympia	
48	Trueman and Virginia Schmidt House	Trueman and Virginia Schmidt House	August 3, 2015 (#15000500)	2932 Maringo Rd., SE; 47°01′20″N 122°53′38″W	Olympia	
49	Seatco Prison Site	Seatco Prison Site	May 2, 1975 (#75001876)	Off WA 507; 46°47′35″N 122°52′11″W	Bucoda	
50	South Capitol Neighborhood Historic District	South Capitol Neighborhood Historic District	October 22, 1991 (#91001516)	Roughly bounded by Capitol Lake, US 5 and 16th Ave. 47°01′51″N 122°53′57″W	Olympia	
51	State Training School for Girls Administration Building	State Training School for Girls Administration Building	June 23, 1988 (#88000701)	20311 Old Hwy. 9 SW; 46°47′31″N 123°01′39″W	Rochester	
52	Alden Hatch Steele House	Alden Hatch Steele House	June 18, 1992 (#92000783)	1010 S. Franklin St. 47°02′23″N 122°53′48″W	Olympia	Built in 1870.
53	Richard and Lydia Stoecker House	Richard and Lydia Stoecker House	December 15, 2015 (#15000910)	1701 4th Ave. E. 47°02′45″N 122°52′44″W	Olympia	
54	Tenino Depot	Tenino Depot	December 27, 1974 (#74001982)	399 Park Ave W 46°51′15″N 122°51′16″W	Tenino	
55	Tenino Downtown Historic District	Tenino Downtown Historic District	June 25, 2004 (#02001616)	Sussex St. SE; 46°51′26″N 122°51′11″W	Tenino	
56	Tenino Stone Company Quarry	Tenino Stone Company Quarry	July 28, 1983 (#83003355)	City Park; 46°51′16″N 122°51′10″W	Tenino	
57	Thurston County Courthouse	Thurston County Courthouse	July 23, 1981 (#81000592)	Capitol Way; 47°02′15″N 122°54′01″W	Olympia	Built in 1930.
58	Ticknor School	Ticknor School	May 10, 1990 (#90000708)	399 Park Ave W. 46°51′15″N 122°51′16″W	Tenino	Moved in 2002.
59	Town Square	Town Square	June 17, 1987 (#87000868)	Bounded by Seventh, Legion, Capitol Way, and S. Washington; 47°02′35″N 122°53′58″W	Olympia	Established in 1850, this is now known as Sylvester Park.
60	Tumwater Historic District	Tumwater Historic District	May 22, 1978 (#78002782)	Roughly bounded by I-5, Capitol Way and Capitol Lake; 47°01′07″N 122°54′08″W	Tumwater	Includes 1860 Crosby House
61	Tumwater Methodist Church	Tumwater Methodist Church	January 12, 1984 (#84003636)	219 W. B St. 47°00′52″N 122°54′21″W	Tumwater	
62	U.S. Post Office	U.S. Post Office	November 30, 1979 (#79002563)	801 Capitol Way; 47°02′29″N 122°54′05″W	Olympia	Built in 1914.
63	Union Cemetery-Pioneer Calvary Cemetery	Union Cemetery-Pioneer Calvary Cemetery	April 14, 1997 (#97000323)	5700 Littlerock Rd. 46°59′44″N 122°55′16″W	Tumwater	
64	Union Mills Superintendent's House	Union Mills Superintendent's House	June 23, 1988 (#88000699)	7716 Union Mills Rd. 47°01′59″N 122°46′25″W	Olympia	
65	Washington State Capitol Historic District	Washington State Capitol Historic District	June 22, 1979 (#79002564)	State Capitol and environs 47°02′11″N 122°54′09″W	Olympia	
66	Washington State Library	Washington State Library	August 3, 2015 (#15000501)	415 15th Ave., SE; 47°02′04″N 122°54′17″W	Olympia	Also known as Joel M. Pritchard Building.
67	Weyerhaeuser South Bay Log Dump Rural Historic Landscape	Weyerhaeuser South Bay Log Dump Rural Historic Landscape	October 2, 1991 (#91001441)	609 Whitham Rd. 47°08′11″N 122°50′42″W	Olympia vicinity	Also known as the Woodard Bay Natural Resources Conservation Area.
68	Woman's Club of Olympia	Woman's Club of Olympia	June 15, 1979 (#79002565)	1002 Washington St. 47°02′23″N 122°53′53″W	Olympia	Built in 1883.

== See also ==
- List of National Historic Landmarks in Washington (state)
- National Register of Historic Places listings in Washington state
