= Tenino =

Tenino may refer to

- Tenino, Washington, a city in the U.S. state of Washington
- Tenino people, a Native American tribe of the Pacific Northwest, also known as the Warm Springs bands
- The Tenino, a Columbia River sternwheeler in the United States
- Tenino language,
- Tenino Stone Company Quarry, National Register of Historic Places (NRHP) in 1983
- Tenino station, also known as the Tenino Depot, located in Tenino, Washington
- USS Tenino, Abnaki-class fleet ocean tug
- Yelm–Rainier–Tenino Trail, formerly the Yelm–Tenino Trail, rail trail located in Thurston County, Washington
