= Miller–Brewer House =

Historic house in Washington, United States

- U.S. National Register of Historic Places
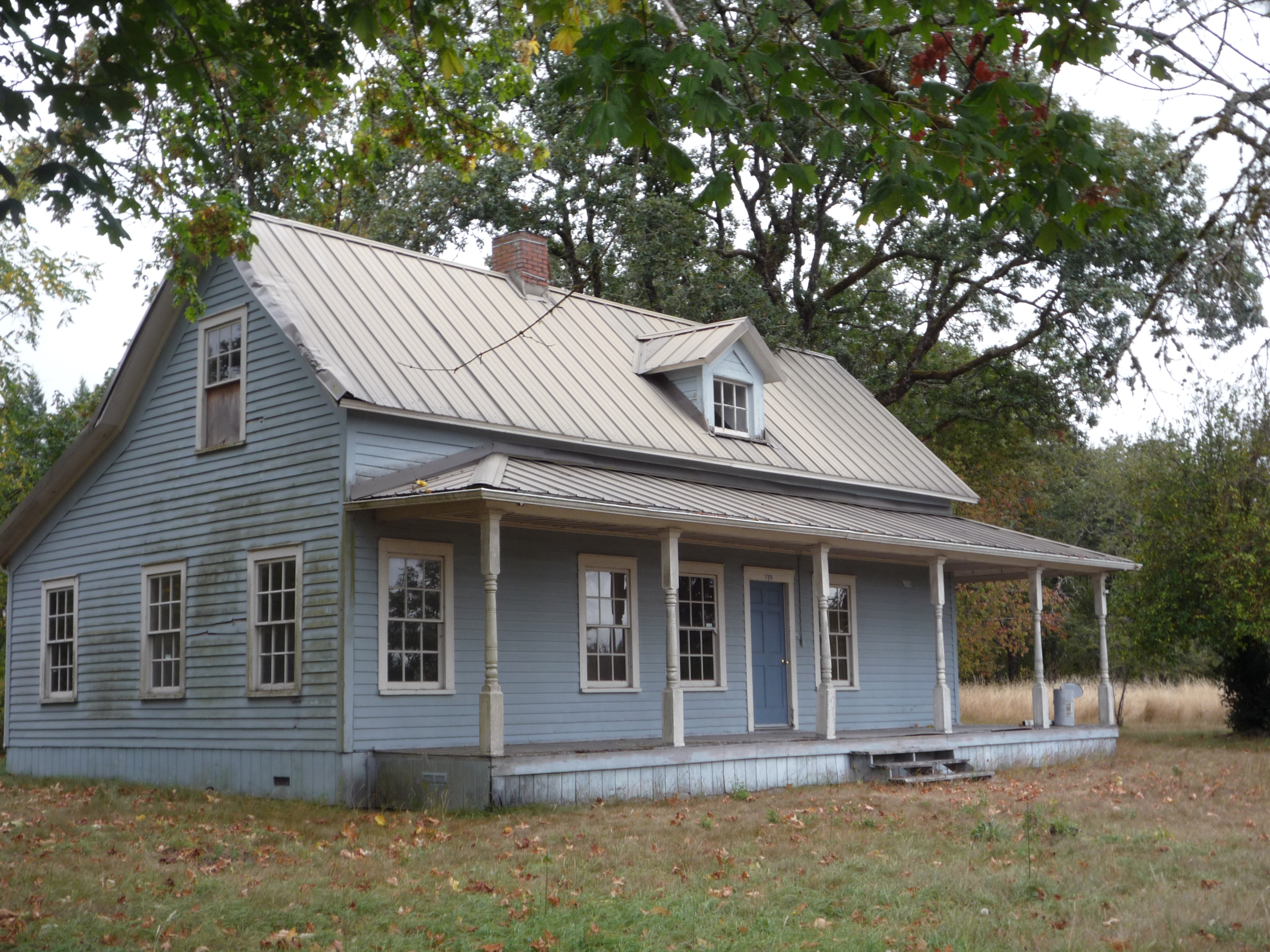

- Location within Washington (state)
- Nearest city: Rochester, Washington
- Coordinates: 46°49′41″N 123°0′18″W
- Area: less than one acre
- Built: 1860
- Built by: George Miller
- Architectural style: Greek Revival
- MPS: Thurston County MRA
- NRHP reference No.: 88000694
- Added to NRHP: June 23, 1988

The Miller–Brewer House was a historic Greek Revival-style home located near Rochester, Washington, United States. It was built in 1860 and prior to 2017, was one of Washington state's few surviving box frame style houses from the territorial era. The house was added to the National Register of Historic Places in 1988. It was destroyed by fire on Aug. 22, 2017.

== Historic importance ==
The Miller–Brewer House, on the National Register of Historic Places, was built in or around 1860 in the area of Rochester, Washington State. The house was historically significant for its box frame (vertical plank) construction, a construction method in use only during the very early settlement period, from 1855 to about 1875. It was one of Washington's very few remaining examples of this construction method, and one of the most intact and best-constructed examples up until its destruction. It was also noteworthy for still being on its original site. Many similarly historic houses have been relocated from their original sites.

== Construction ==
The house was a combination of local Indian and Anglo-American construction techniques. Construction elements discussed are all of primary historical significance. Split cedar (Thuja plicata, Western red-cedar) logs on fieldstone and undressed Tenino quarry stone supported hewn-log cedar girders and split-log cedar floor joists. The girders were 11"x11" hand-hewn, with adze marks on all sides. The tops were notched for the floor joists. The floor joist logs were charred prior to splitting, a local Indian wood-preserving construction technique. Second-story floor joists were rough-sawn 2"x8" cedar. The frame was made from milled cedar lumber using square nails. The walls were formed from vertical rough-sawn 1"x12" cedar planks planed smooth on the edges to allow a tight seam. Two layers allowed the seams between planks in one layer to be covered by the planks in the other layer. Two-ply walls also allowed sufficient structural strength for two stories and gave much better weather insulation than one-ply box frame construction. Upper and lower girders held the vertical planks in position. Exterior siding was high quality, quarter-sawn, 1/2"x6" horizontal cedar lap siding with tight-edge grain and a 5 3/4" exposure attached with square iron nails. Rough-sawn corner boards were used on all building corners.

Windows were all of Douglas-fir (Pseudotsuga menziesii). Larger windows were double-pane, but the box frame construction did not allow for wall pockets for sash weights. Windows had to be propped open with a stick. Upper story windows were fixed sash. Interior and exterior window surrounds were all rough-sawn cedar. Window sills were cedar. Attic rafters were rough-sawn 2"x6" cedar. Roof shakes were 3 ft-long straight-split cedar. Remnant shakes remained in the attic space, but the roof was replaced with metal in 1993 by Stan Craig Enterprises. Interior and exterior door surrounds were all 1"x5" rough-sawn cedar. Hinges and most interior locksets were original.

Interior walls were covered with felt slip sheets and wallpaper. Floorboards were circular-sawn tongue-and-groove, attached directly to the floor joists. The stairway consisted of wedge-shaped cedar treads with closed risers in a tight 180-degree turn with no handrails. The back-to-back fireplaces were made of Tenino sandstone mantels with fire brick fireboxes and wood surrounds.

While the house had front and back porches originally, the current porches were not the original ones.

== History ==
The land that the house sat on was first claimed by DF Byles under the Donation Land Claim Act. The builders of the house, George and Marita Miller, purchased the land in the late 1850s, as well as filing their own claim under the Donation Land Claim Act. They probably lived in a log cabin while proving-up the land claim and building the house. It is likely they also hired local Indians as construction workers for the house. The Millers grazed cattle and sheep, tended an orchard and a vegetable garden, and raised various crops. George Miller served as a county commissioner and in the territorial legislature while living in the house.

Reece Brewer crossed the Oregon Trail in 1853 as a teenager with his widowed mother and various older siblings and their spouses, settling first near present-day Junction City, Oregon. Reece and his first wife Eliza Johnston, along with two of Reece's older brothers and their families, moved north to the Grand Mound, Washington area in 1860. Eliza (Johnston) died in 1870 and is buried in the nearby Grand Mound Cemetery. The Millers moved to Centralia, Washington in 1873 and sold the house and land to Reece Brewer, a family friend of the Millers from Oregon, and now a widower with four children (James, John, Martha and Ella). Reece ran cattle and kept an apiary on the land. In 1875, he remarried, to Flora French, who had two children, Effie and Fred, before dying in 1878.

Reece Brewer, like his friend George Miller, served as a county commissioner (three terms) and in the territorial legislature. Reece was chairman of the county commission when the Thurston County Courthouse was built in 1891. Reece and his daughter Ella, from his first marriage, ran the local post office out of the house from 1884 to 1888. Reece remarried a third time in 1890, to a second Eliza (James Stocking), a widow with grown children. At this time the residents of the house consisted of Reece, Eliza the third wife, and Flora's children Effie and Fred.

Effie, the second youngest Brewer child, married Frank "Tib" Mills in 1897 and moved to Grand Mound. The youngest Brewer child, Fred, married Gertrude Morris in 1900. Reece split the house into a duplex and the newlyweds Fred and Gertrude moved into the house. The kitchen/dining room was shared. Separate staircases led to the second story. The east apartment contained two large rooms downstairs, while the west apartment contained one room downstairs. Each side had its own fireplace, built back-to-back with a shared chimney.

Fred and Gertrude moved to Grand Mound in 1903. In 1906, Eliza the third wife died, and Effie and Tib moved into the house with Reece. Effie and Tib took over the farm duties, cared for Reece until his death in 1909, and took in the children of Ella, Effie's older half sister, on Ella's death. A cold room was built in the 1910-20s, attached to the northeast corner of the house. Some time in the 1930-50s, the family built a barn and milk shed for dairy cows. These additions are not considered historic.

Tib Mills died some time in the 1930s, and Fred Brewer moved back into the house, bringing a flock of sheep with him.

Fred's wife, Gertrude, had died in childbirth in her twenties. Their two children, Wilbert and Flora, were also cared for in this house by Fred's sister, Effie Mills. Wilbert and Flora both later married and remained in the area for the rest of their lives. Wilbert and his wife, Agnes James Brewer, visited Fred and Effie often through the years, as did their daughter and grandchildren. Effie died in 1963, and Fred arranged to sell the house and surrounding acreage of Garry oak woodland and glacial outwash prairie to the Washington State Game Department (now the Washington Department of Fish & Wildlife). Fred died in 1964.

In 1965, the Game Department converted the house to office space. One of the two staircases from the duplex conversion was filled in, and the 19th century wallpaper was covered with sheetrock. Under the sheetrock, the wallpaper had been well preserved and was considered of primary historical importance due to the rarity of intact wallpaper from this period. The cedar shake roof was replaced with metal to preserve the interior from rain damage.

The Miller–Brewer House was destroyed in a 485-acre wildfire on August 22, 2017.
