= Gate School =

Gate School may refer to:

- Gate School (Gate, Oklahoma), listed on the National Register of Historic Places in Beaver County, Oklahoma
- Gate School (Gate, Washington), listed on the National Register of Historic Places in Thurston County, Washington
