= Colonel Wright =

American steamboat

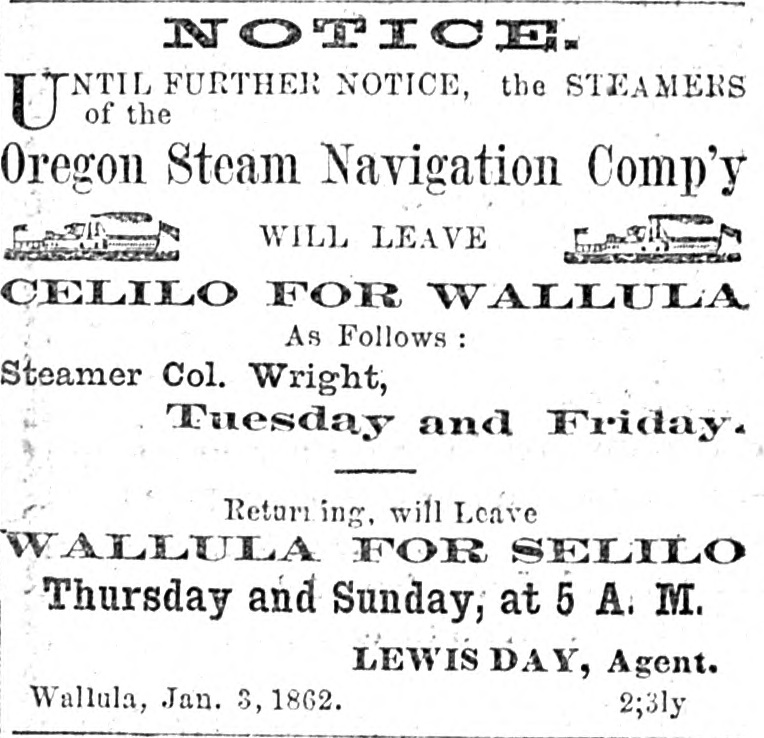
- Advertisement for Colonel Wright, published in the Walla Walla Statesman, February 28, 1863

History
- Name: Colonel Wright
- Owner: R.R. Thompson and E.F. Coe and (later) Oregon Steam Navigation Company
- Launched: October 24, 1858
- In service: 1858
- Out of service: 1865
- Fate: Dismantled at Celilo Engines to Mary Moody
- Notes: First steamboat to operate on Columbia River above The Dalles

General characteristics
- Length: 110 ft (34 m)
- Beam: 21 ft (6.4 m)
- Depth: 5.0 ft (1.5 m) depth of hold
- Installed power: steam, high-pressure boiler, twin engines, horizontally mounted, 12.5" bore by 50" stroke
- Propulsion: sternwheel

The Colonel Wright was the first steamboat to operate on the Columbia River above The Dalles in the parts of the Oregon Country that later became the U.S. states of Oregon, Washington and Idaho. She was the first steamboat to run on the Snake River. She was named after Colonel (later General) George Wright, an army commander in the Indian Wars in the Oregon Country in the 1850s. She was generally called the Wright during her operating career.

== Construction and operations ==
The Colonel Wright was launched October 24, 1858 at the mouth of the Deschutes River and began to run in early in 1859. The Colonel Wright was 110 ft (34 m) long, 21 ft (6.4 m) beam, and had 5.0 ft (1.5 m) depth of hold. The launching of the Colonel Wright was an important step in the settlement of the Inland Empire, Idaho and eastern Oregon, and in consequence, she made a fortune for her owners before others could interfere with the trade. Her profit potential was greatly enhanced by the discovery of gold in Idaho in the spring of 1859.

She was built by R. R. Thompson and E. F. Coe, who had Government transport contracts on the middle and upper Columbia River. They had been carrying freight for Fort Walla Walla from Celilo Falls in bateaux at a rate of $100 per ton. Colonel Jordan, the chief quartermaster, encouraged them to construct the steamer. When she was completed they reduced the rates to $80 and made three round trips a week throughout the summer, taking full loads both ways and quickly growing rich. The Colonel Wright made her first trip in April 1859. The Colonel Wright was first commanded by Capt. Leonard White, with Capt. Ephraim W. Baughman (1835–1923), pilot.

Captain White was a veteran of navigation on the upper Willamette River, and later became known as one of the most intrepid of all steamboat captains. When he was first assigned to the Wright, Captain White hung a square sail on the steamboat as a precaution in case of mechanical failure. When he took the Wright on her first trip up the Snake River, and when she hit a snag near the mouth of the Palouse River, she almost sank before Captain White could beach her. Bailed out and repaired, the Colonel Wright was able to continue her journey. White received a salary of $500 per month, a huge amount of money for the time, and retained the position for several years.

== Top step on the giant staircase ==
Transportation up the Columbia River was like traversing a giant staircase, and the Colonel Wright was the first boat to run on the top step. This of course was the key to her money-making ability. The Columbia was never freely navigable in its natural state. There were many barriers of shallow water and rapids, the most important of which for navigation purposes were the Cascades of the Columbia in the Columbia Gorge, followed by a navigable run to the east known as the "middle Columbia" which terminated at The Dalles. A long portage there began around a series of rapids, generally known by the name of the most important one, which was Celilo Falls. The portage route ended at Celilo, Oregon where the "upper Columbia" began. Steamboats could run from Celilo to Wallula where a stage line, and later a railroad ran to Walla Walla, then the principal settlement in the Inland Empire. It was this, the upper step of the river, on which the Colonel Wright enjoyed a monopoly for a short time as the sole steamboat on the river.

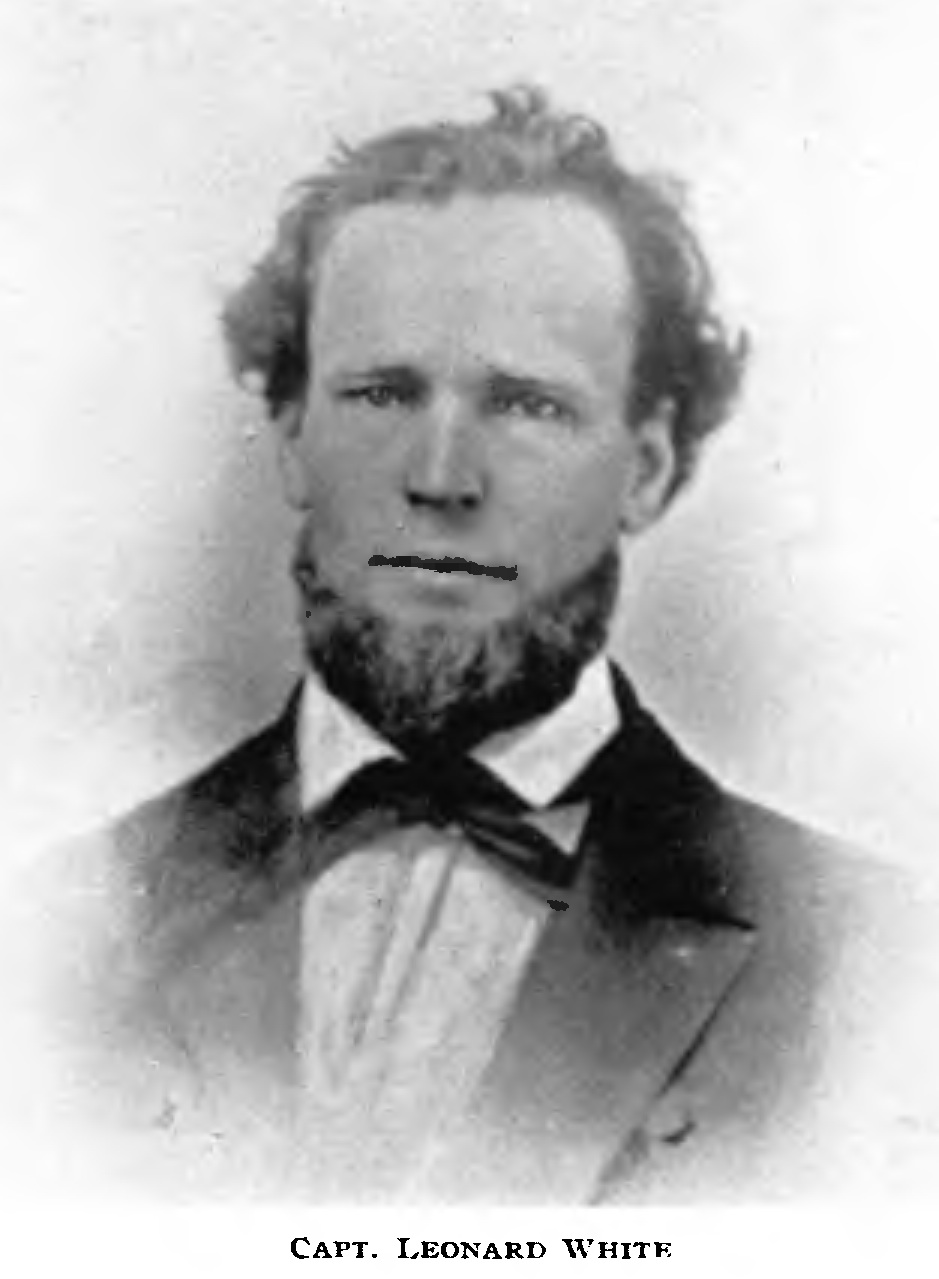
Leonard White, first captain of the Colonel Wright

Downriver transport could be quite fast for the day. A traveler bound from Walla Walla would take the stage to Wallula, board the Colonel Wright or another steamer, then head downriver to Celilo. After a bumpy ride over the portage, the traveler would arrive at The Dalles where an overnight stay would be necessary at one of the hotels. The next morning the traveler would board a steamboat on the middle river, perhaps the Oneonta, for a morning run down to the Upper Cascades. There again the traveler disembarked, usually on the favored north side, and rode on the portage railway to the landing at the Lower Cascades. There, a steamer, possibly the Wilson G. Hunt, then ran downriver to Portland, which the traveler reached some thirty hours after leaving Walla Walla, a feat which was considered remarkable at that time. The genius of the Oregon Steam Navigation Company was to control all the boats on all the steps of the staircase, and the portages too, thus achieving a monopoly on transport in the days before there were roads or railways capable of mounting any competition. The Wright was simply superb at making money, earning as much as $2,500 a trip in passenger fares alone.

== Inland exploration ==
In May 1859, Colonel Wright made a scouting trip fifty miles up the Snake River, which joins the Columbia not far to the north of Wallula. Colonel Wright was the first steamboat to reach Lewiston, Idaho, 140 miles upriver from Wallula. In 1861 she ascended the Clearwater River to within two miles of the forks, accomplishing the downstream run of over 300 miles to Wallula in less than 24 hours. Thompson and Coe made so much money with the Wright that in the spring of 1860 they built a larger and more powerful steamer, the Tenino on the same route, afterward pooling both steamers with the Oregon Steam Navigation Company.

== Dance hall transport ==
In the spring of 1862, the Colonel Wright was engaged in the transport of a somewhat unusual kind, and had reached the wharf at Fort Walla Walla, near Wallula and the mouth of the Walla Walla River, on a trip to Lewiston, where she waited for a few days for the ice to clear upriver. In the words of Fritz Timmen, she was

burdened with all the plunder necessary to build and equip a first-class saloon, gambling hall, and honky-tonk. The passenger list was liberally sprinkled with gamblers, bartenders, and an attractive collection of dance-hall hostesses and vaudeville entertainers. ... The word spread among the woman-hungry bachelors on nearby ranches that the Wright's most important cargo wore perfume. The boat was besieged. In panic, Captain White cast off for the more isolated shelter of Ice Harbor. His strategy failed. By canoe, raft, and rowboat, amorous single males for miles around sought out the steamer. By the time the troupe was delivered at Lewiston, its manager had to send back to Portland for additional femaie personnel. But ranch life in Franklin, Whitman, and Walla Walla counties was a lot less lonely from then on.

== Captain White relieved of command ==
About 1863, after Wright came under control of the Oregon Steam Navigation Company, the firm's president, Capt. John C. Ainsworth, concluded that Captain White's remuneration was excessive for a steamboat master. Captain White did not agree, refused to take a pay cut, and hence was succeeded by Capt. Thomas Stump, from the Sacramento River, at a salary of $300 per month. Coe, Felton, and J. H. D. Gray also had charge of the steamer at different times.

== Captain Stump takes the Wright far up the Snake River ==
Wright made her last trip in the spring of 1865, in command of Capt. Thomas Stump, with Capt. William Gray as pilot, who attempted to take her above the Snake River rapids to Farewell Bend. She was eight days in making a distance of about 100 miles, then headed down stream and returned to Lewiston in less than five hours. Captain Stump reported his explorations as having been of no practical value; but he had taken a steamer farther into the heart of the regions lying to the east than any craft had ever gone before.

== Dismantled in 1865 ==
In August 1865, the Colonel Wright's hull, worn out from the upriver trips, was dismantled.
