= Wolf Haven International =

American non-profit organization

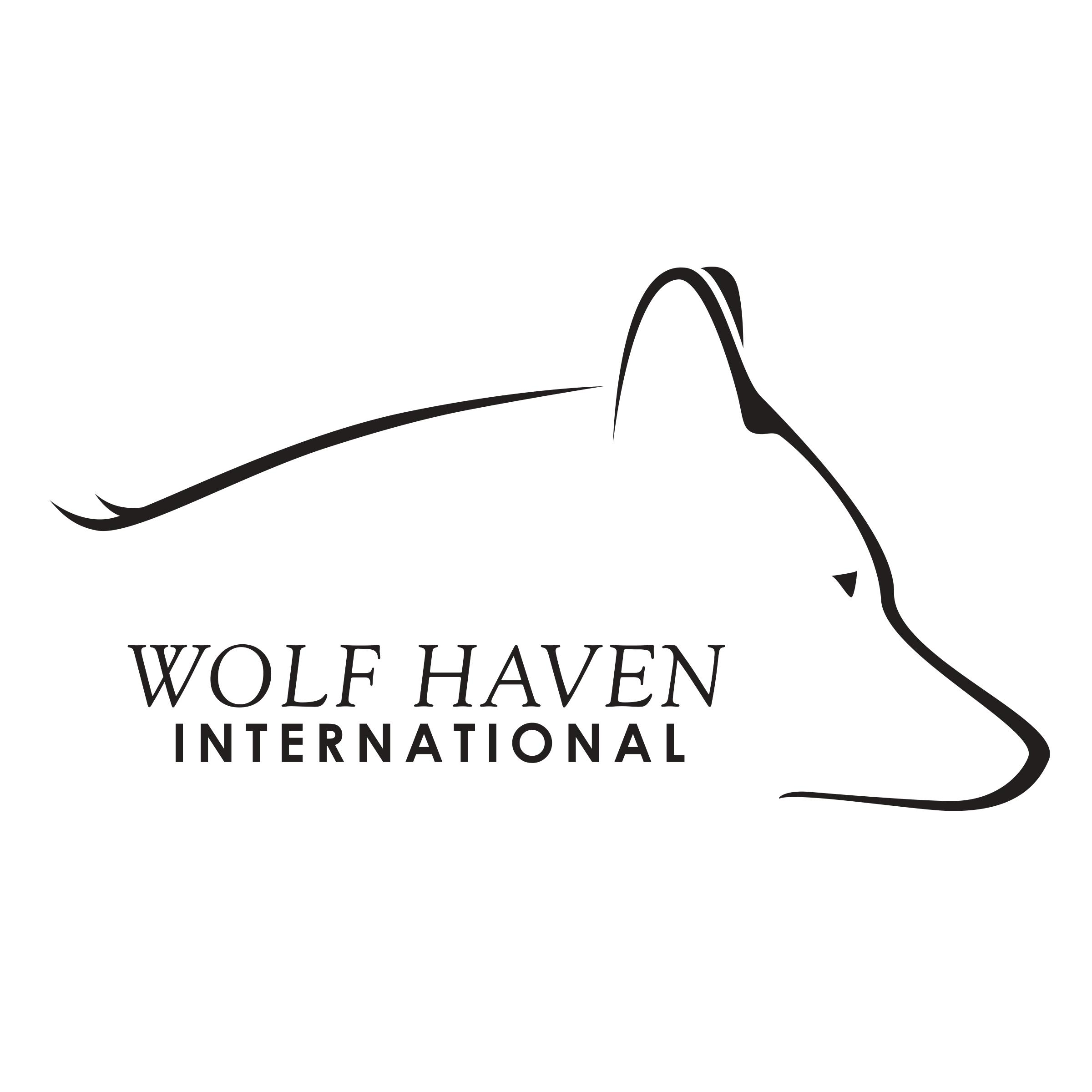
- Formation: 1982; 44 years ago
- Type: 501(c)(3) nonprofit organization
- Purpose: To conserve and protect wolves and their habitat
- Headquarters: Tenino, Washington
- Staff: 20
- Website: www.wolfhaven.org
- Formerly called: Wolf Country; Wolf Haven America

Wolf Haven International, previously known as Wolf Country and Wolf Haven America, is a wolf sanctuary and 501(c)(3) non-profit organization headquartered in Tenino, Washington. Founded in 1982 by Steve and Linda Kuntz, the organization provides educational programs on wolves, engages in wolf-related activism, and operates as a sanctuary for displaced, captive-born wolves. It also fosters and participates in captive-breeding programs for two highly endangered types of wolves: the red wolf and the Mexican wolf. Wolf Haven is one of three facilities in the United States that provides pre-release housing for Mexican gray wolves bred for Southwest restoration programs.

Over 55 animals live on its 82-acre (33 ha) refuge, and a smaller public area can be toured by visitors with reservations. These include gray wolves, Mexican wolves, red wolves, wolfdogs and two coyotes. With the recent acquisition of a second wolf sanctuary in Bridger, Montana, which has 35 wolves, Wolf Haven International cares for nearly 100 animals.

== History ==
=== Foundation ===
Steve and Linda Kuntz, who are considered the founders of Wolf Haven International, first became involved with wolves after purchasing a wolf pup while living in Colorado in 1978, having no idea that wolves were endangered at the time. They would later meet and befriend Ed Andrews and his wife, two naturalists who ran Wolf Country Foundation, an educational organization that also provided homes for eight wolves in their care. The wolves had been acquired from research programs, federal agencies, and the Fairbanks Zoo after it went bankrupt and ceased operation.

In 1980, the Andrews moved from Colorado, stating it was too expensive to operate there. At the time, the Colorado wildlife authorities stated that they had begun investigating the couple's activities, which were halted by their moving. The couple originally went to Jackson Hole, Wyoming, but were denied a permit to import the wolves into the area and were forced to leave. The Andrews then moved to Washington state, setting up their compound on 4 acres (16,000 m^{2}) of land in South Prairie. Their neighbors, primarily ranchers, objected to the new facility, and complained that the wolves were noisy. One neighbor killed two of the Andrews pet Doberman Pinschers, claiming the dogs were on his land and had killed his wife's cat. Though the facility was legal by state standards, the city passed an ordinance requiring the Andrews to obtain their neighbors' approval for it.

The city later passed an ordinance making it illegal to own wolves, so the group packed up once again, relocating to Tenino, Washington (near Olympia), with its now 22-strong pack of wolves. With thousands of yards between the wolf pens and the nearest neighbors, the group was able to settle in and find acceptance on land donated by an anonymous supporter. The Kuntzes joined the Andrews as their assistants, and the volunteers of Wolf Haven continued giving educational lectures and caring for captive-bred wolves needing homes. After Wolf Haven's arrival, Washington also made it illegal to own wolves, but the organization was granted an exemption.

In early 1982, the Andrews turned the organization over to the Kuntzes, who incorporated it as a nonprofit organization, Wolf Haven America, on September 10, 1982. Operated by volunteers, it continued focusing on the dual purposes of education and housing wolves that might otherwise be destroyed. By 1990, the group was renamed Wolf Haven International, to reflect its dedication to wolves around the world, and expanded to have a dedicated board of directors and paid staff positions. According to the organization, it has provided a home to over 250 wolves that were rescued from "roadside zoos, animal collectors, private owners, research and other facilities."

In 2018, Wolf Haven acquired a second existing wolf sanctuary, formerly known as the McCleery Buffalo Wolf Foundation, located in Bridger, Montana. Now called the McCleery Ranch, the sanctuary is home to 35 Great Plains wolves.

== Organizational model ==
Wolf Haven International operates under a license issued by the USDA. Staffed primarily by volunteers and 16 paid staff, its overall operations are managed by a board of directors, led by an executive director.

== Activities ==
Wolf Haven International was accredited by the American Sanctuary Association (ASA) in 2014 and the Global Federation of Animal Sanctuaries (GFAS) in 2015. Wolf Haven is the only wolf sanctuary in the world to earn global accreditation.

The photo essay book Wolf Haven: Sanctuary and the Future of Wolves in North America, with photos by Annie Marie Musselman and essay by Brenda Peterson, was published by Sasquatch Books in 2016. A follow-up children's book by the same people, called Lobos, A Wolf Family Returns to the Wild, told the true story of a family of Mexican gray wolves born at Wolf Haven and released into the wild in Mexico.

According to The Olympian, Wolf Haven International is "one of the top wolf sanctuaries in the country". When the center first opened, it housed 22 wolves. By 1991, it was up to 36 wolves, and in 2006 the 80-acre (320,000 m^{2}) compound housed 47 wolves. Approximately 12,000 visitors tour the facility each year. A variety of wolves are kept in residence, including, gray wolves, Mexican gray wolves, and red wolves. There are also some wolfdogs. While wolves generally live 4–9 years in the wild, those at Wolf Haven International have lived to reach 15–19 years of age.

Wolf Haven publishes a quarterly magazine, Wolf Tracks, which is distributed to donating members. The Winter 2009 issue won an APEX Award for Publication Excellence in the "One-of-a-Kind Scientific & Environmental Publications". In 2006, Wolf Haven was featured as one of Rand McNally's "50 Adventures Within 15 Minutes of Interstate (Interstate 5)."
