= Tenino, Washington =

- City
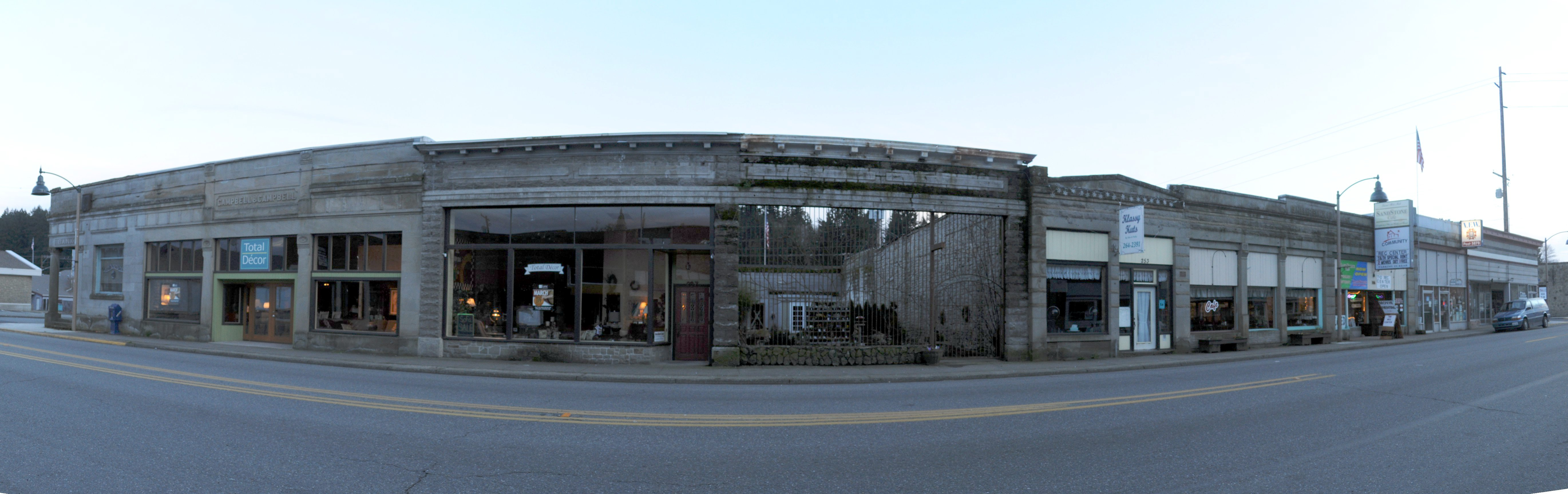
- Downtown Tenino, along Sussex Ave., 2011
- Nickname: The Stone City
- Interactive location map of Tenino
- Coordinates: 46°51′24″N 122°51′1″W
- Country: United States
- State: Washington
- County: Thurston

Government
  - Type: Mayor–council
  - Mayor: Dave Watterson

Area
  - Total: 1.46 sq mi (3.77 km^{2})
  - Land: 1.46 sq mi (3.77 km^{2})
  - Water: 0 sq mi (0.00 km^{2})
- Elevation: 289 ft (88 m)

Population (2020)
  - Total: 1,870
  - Estimate (2021): 1,958
  - Density: 1,281.2/sq mi (494.66/km^{2})
- Time zone: UTC-8 (PST)
  - Summer (DST): UTC-7 (PDT)
- ZIP Code: 98589
- Area code: 360, 564
- FIPS code: 53-70630
- GNIS feature ID: 1512718
- Website: cityoftenino.us

Tenino (/təˈnaɪnoʊ/) is a city in Thurston County, Washington, United States. The population was 1,870 at the 2020 census.

Incorporated in 1906, the city sits upon land first established as a food-source prairie for Native Americans living in the area. The town grew around an economy of stone quarrying, with local sandstone being used in several government and university buildings in the Pacific Northwest. With a decrease in demand for stone, the town converted one abandoned quarry into a community pool. Its downtown district is listed on the National Register of Historic Places.

Tenino gained notoriety during the Great Depression for the use of wooden money as public currency for its residents, a practice briefly revived during the COVID-19 pandemic. The city was named for a steamboat used during a railroad committee expedition.

== Etymology ==
The origin of the name Tenino, used by the Northern Pacific Railroad for their station when it was completed on October 8, 1872, has been debated for over a century. One theory suggests that Tenino was a Chinook Jargon word translated to mean fork or branch and was a named waypoint on an indigenous trail that traversed through the area before it was converted into a military road during the Puget Sound War. A second hypothesis mentions that the moniker is taken from the railroad's number for a locomotive engine, survey stake, or train car, often described in forms such as T9o, 10-9-0, or engine No. 1090. These theories have been disproven for decades, but keep resurfacing because definitive proof of the actual origin was lacking.

According to city historian Richard A. Edwards, the name "Tenino" was used by a steamboat of the Oregon Steam Navigation Company (OSN) on the Columbia and Snake rivers. The company had transported a Northern Pacific committee in early October 1872 prior to the town's founding; Northern Pacific had also acquired a controlling interest in the OSN earlier that year.

On October 12, 1872, at a meeting in Portland, Oregon, shortly after their tour up the Columbia River, John C. Ainsworth and other officers of the OSN made a presentation about their common interests, President Cass proposed a resolution that also named the momentarily Northern terminus near Hodgden's station "Tenino". As reported the following month in The Washington Standard, this connection allowed travel from the "old Tenino" (the OSN steamboat which held the record for traveling the farthest east up the Snake River), to "the new town" of Tenino which was the railroad's then current northwest terminus.

In early 1873, the Northern Pacific Railroad and local homesteader Stephen Hodgden filed plats in Thurston county establishing the town of Tenino. By late 1873, the financial backing of the railroad was in financial crisis and their stock in the OSN was sold for debt, ending the railroad's direct connection to the steamboat Tenino. The steamboat Tenino was itself named after the Tenino native band who once lived near The Dalles in Oregon and whose descendants are now part of the Confederated Tribes of Warm Springs.

The name also appears informally as "T-9-O," a shortened variation in use as early as 1873.

== History ==
=== 19th-century beginnings ===
The city was officially incorporated on July 24, 1906, but Tenino existed as a rural community since the mid-19th century, the area containing a population of approximately 170 people by 1870 and the site fully platted in 1873. Initially, American settlers were attracted to the open prairies created and maintained by local natives through controlled burns to cultivate camas root, a staple food source. Records indicate the initial settlers' community centered on the prairie approximately 1/2 a mile (0.80 km) south of the present town. Early residents named their first post office and school "Coal Bank", in the 1860s, a reference to a nearby coal outcropping. It was later renamed Tenino.

The railroad ended at Tenino for a time after Northern Pacific underwent financial difficulties, making the town the final passenger and freight stop on the line to Olympia. Timber production and manufacturing, as well as agriculture and mining, were early economic factors in Tenino, contributing to the community's growth. The largest part of the local economy was the quarrying of sandstone. Numerous buildings in Tenino's early days of formation were built of sandstone.

The area was rich in sandstone and part of a geologic layer known as the McIntosh Formation. By the late 19th century, a number of sandstone quarrying companies began shipping the stone as a construction material for large buildings on the West Coast. Buildings that used Tenino sandstone withstood two catastrophic events, the Great Seattle Fire of 1889 and the 1906 San Francisco earthquake, leading to the increase and popularity of the material. Eventually, Tenino sandstone was used in the construction of the Old Capitol Building and the old Thurston County Courthouse in Olympia, the rebuilt Seattle public library, the Mason County Courthouse in Shelton, the First Congregational Church, developed by Cameron Stone, in Tacoma, Denny Hall and the Theodore Jacobson Observatory at the University of Washington, the Pittock Mansion and the Pioneer Courthouse in Portland, Oregon, the Calvary Presbyterian Church of San Francisco and several US post office buildings, including at The Dalles, Oregon. Additional buildings constructed with Tenio sandstone include the Portland Public Library and the Science Hall at Washington State University. The US Government also used stone from these quarries to construct jetties at Westport, Washington and elsewhere.

=== 20th century ===
The quarries declined in the early 20th century when many builders switched to concrete. Logging, saw mills, and coal mining remained as well established industries in the area. However, as the timber played out and railroads switched to diesel in the mid-20th century, these industries also declined.

During the late 1940s and early 1950s, before the construction of Interstate 5, a notorious stretch along U.S. Route 99 through Tenino gained a reputation as the "Speed Trap of the West". Many motorists considered it a speed trap because of the strict enforcement by police of the abruptly reduced speed limit through town.

Since the mid-1970s, the US Army has used a geographical map of Tenino as a training aid in map reading, because of the variety of symbols represented on the map.

On July 29, 1990, the Town of Tenino was reorganized as a Non-Charter Code City following a referendum, resulting in the name being changed to the City of Tenino.

=== 21st century ===
While Tenino retains its historic downtown, now a historic district listed on the National Register of Historic Places, the town serves largely as a "bedroom community", many of its citizens commuting by car to larger cities such as Olympia and Tacoma for work.

Protests were held in the city in 2023 to voice opposition to the creation of a state contracted transitional facility for sex offenders that would have been located next to Tenino's City Park. The facility operator cancelled the project after a few weeks of objections from the community. Due to the dissent, several bills were proposed in the state legislature that would add stricter requirements and better communication policies regarding sex offender housing.

A sesquicentennial jubilee celebrating Tenino's 150 years as a recognized community was held in July 2023. The day-long event hosted a parade and vendor markets, with the highlight of a "birthday card" written in chalk by artists on a closed intersection in the city. The city's U.S. House of Representative at the time, Marie Gluesenkamp Perez, bestowed Tenino with a Congressional Record copy of a floor speech she gave honoring the community and its achievement. In December, a bill was introduced at the state legislature that would declare Tenino sandstone as the state rock.

Due to ongoing "budget misreporting issues" since 2021, the city council announced in May 2026 the dissolution of the Tenino Police Department. Tenino could no longer afford a police department due to an outstanding $1.6 million debt within the city's budget. The debt was partly due to a lack of hiring consistency at the clerk-treasurer position since 2020, which led to state auditing issues and the non-sanctioned use of unrestricted funds for other budget items and projects. Required by state laws, a retroactive and more expansive interfund loan was created and is scheduled to be paid off in ten years. A temporary, "policing services" contract was authorized between Tenino and the Thurston County Sherriff's Office.

=== Wooden money ===
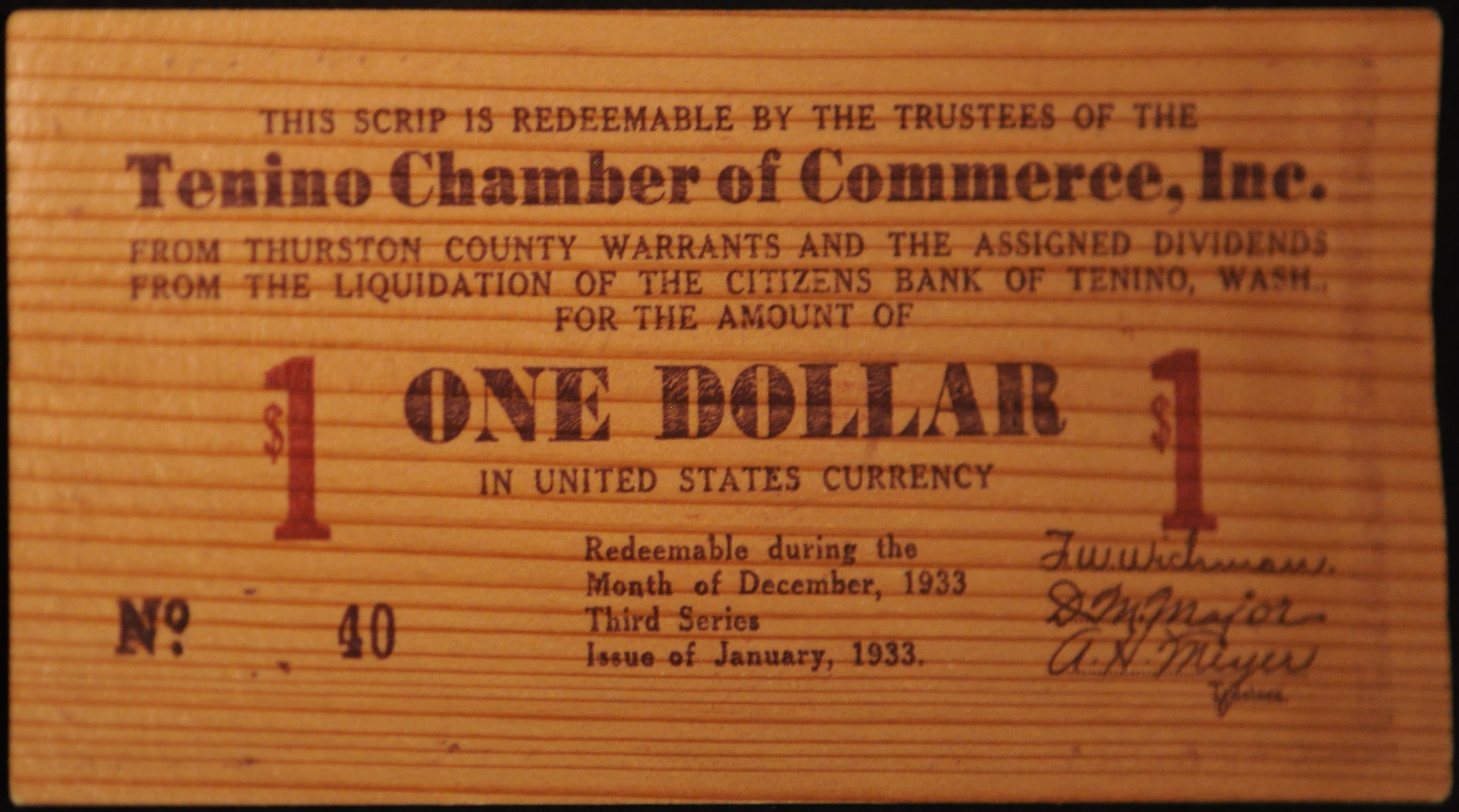
Tenino wooden money

Tenino briefly achieved national notoriety during the Great Depression of the 1930s. After the local bank failed in 1931, the town government temporarily issued wooden money scrip, made of thin-cut cedar and spruce, and was used by Tenino's residents when cash was scarce. However, most of this wooden currency was never redeemed as it became a valuable collector's item. The Tenino Depot Museum continues to use the original printing machinery, creating new wooden tender for souvenir purposes, but the dollars can still be used at some Tenino businesses.

The city began printing the wooden currency again during the COVID-19 recession in 2020, to distribute to the local residents. The revival of the program was approved by the Washington State Auditor and began in May 2020.

Wooden scrip from both the Great Depression and Covid periods were added to a Smithsonian National Museum of American History exhibit, titled "The Value of Money", in 2025.

== Geography ==
According to the United States Census Bureau, the city has a total area of 1.44 square miles (3.73 km^{2}), all of it land.

== Demographics ==
Historical population
Census	Pop.	Note	%±
1890	339		—
1910	1,038		—
1920	850		−18.1%
1930	938		10.4%
1940	952		1.5%
1950	969		1.8%
1960	836		−13.7%
1970	962		15.1%
1980	1,280		33.1%
1990	1,292		0.9%
2000	1,447		12.0%
2010	1,695		17.1%
2020	1,870		10.3%
2021 (est.)	1,958		4.7%
U.S. Decennial Census; 2020 Census

=== 2020 census ===
As of the 2020 census, Tenino had a population of 1,870. The median age was 37.3 years. 22.9% of residents were under the age of 18 and 14.5% of residents were 65 years of age or older. For every 100 females there were 95.6 males, and for every 100 females age 18 and over there were 89.1 males age 18 and over.

0.0% of residents lived in urban areas, while 100.0% lived in rural areas.

There were 754 households in Tenino, of which 35.1% had children under the age of 18 living in them. Of all households, 40.5% were married-couple households, 18.8% were households with a male householder and no spouse or partner present, and 28.6% were households with a female householder and no spouse or partner present. About 26.1% of all households were made up of individuals and 11.5% had someone living alone who was 65 years of age or older.

There were 780 housing units, of which 3.3% were vacant. The homeowner vacancy rate was 0.8% and the rental vacancy rate was 2.0%.

Racial composition as of the 2020 census
Race	Number	Percent
White	1,528	81.7%
Black or African American	18	1.0%
American Indian and Alaska Native	32	1.7%
Asian	23	1.2%
Native Hawaiian and Other Pacific Islander	2	0.1%
Some other race	61	3.3%
Two or more races	206	11.0%
Hispanic or Latino (of any race)	148	7.9%

=== 2010 census ===
As of the 2010 census, there were 1,695 people, 691 households, and 440 families residing in the city. The population density was 1,177.1 inhabitants per square mile (454.5/km^{2}). There were 740 housing units at an average density of 513.9 per square mile (198.4/km^{2}). The racial makeup of the city was 90.7% White, 0.2% African American, 0.9% Native American, 1.2% Asian, 0.3% Pacific Islander, 2.1% from other races, and 4.6% from two or more races. Hispanic or Latino of any race were 7.4% of the population.

There were 691 households, of which 35.6% had children under the age of 18 living with them, 42.3% were married couples living together, 16.2% had a female householder with no husband present, 5.2% had a male householder with no wife present, and 36.3% were non-families. 28.9% of all households were made up of individuals, and 12.4% had someone living alone who was 65 years of age or older. The average household size was 2.45 and the average family size was 3.01.

The median age in the city was 36.8 years. 25.4% of residents were under the age of 18; 7.6% were between the ages of 18 and 24; 27.1% were from 25 to 44; 26.8% were from 45 to 64; and 13% were 65 years of age or older. The gender makeup of the city was 46.7% male and 53.3% female.

=== 2000 census ===
As of the 2000 census, there were 1,447 people, 575 households, and 396 families residing in the city. The population density was 1,720.3 people per square mile (664.2 people/km^{2}). There were 615 housing units at an average density of 731.1 per square mile (282.3/km^{2}). The racial makeup of the city was 90.53% White, 0.83% African American, 1.17% Native American, 3.11% Asian, 0.07% Pacific Islander, 1.94% from other races, and 2.35% from two or more races. Hispanic or Latino of any race were 3.80% of the population.

There were 575 households, out of which 37.7% had children under the age of 18 living with them, 48.7% were married couples living together, 15.7% had a female householder with no husband present, and 31.0% were non-families. 27.3% of all households were made up of individuals, and 13.6% had someone living alone who was 65 years of age or older. The average household size was 2.52 and the average family size was 3.01.

In the city, the age distribution of the population shows 29.8% under the age of 18, 7.6% from 18 to 24, 29.4% from 25 to 44, 18.9% from 45 to 64, and 14.3% who were 65 years of age or older. The median age was 34 years. For every 100 females, there were 91.4 males. For every 100 females age 18 and over, there were 89.2 males.

The median income for a household in the city was $34,526, and the median income for a family was $41,208. Males had a median income of $31,058 versus $25,972 for females. The per capita income for the city was $18,244. About 5.0% of families and 9.1% of the population were below the poverty line, including 12.4% of those under age 18 and 9.9% of those age 65 or over.

== Economy ==
One of Tenino's main economic outputs is agriculture, particularly livestock for consumption. After the loss of a meat processing plant within the region, the city and county began plans to develop a more encompassing business park to help the local economy. Given the moniker, Southwest Washington Agricultural Business & Innovation Park, construction began in 2023 with plans to contain a slaughterhouse, food processing, an event center, and buildings to house small businesses. Funding of $1.25 million from the state legislature was secured for future phases of construction with an additional $4.4 million proposed at the federal level. The event center and an initial building for small businesses were completed in early 2025; a grand opening of the park was held in May 2025. Located on Old Highway 99, a sign carved out of sandstone by local artisans mentions the official name of the business center, Tenino Agriculture Innovation Park.

== Education ==
One of the first schools constructed in the county, after the formation of the Washington Territory, was erected approximately in 1862 at was then referred to as the Coal Bank Precinct. The school operated in its first year with a $78 budget and pupils included both settler and indigenous children. A district split around 1878 led to the build of a schoolhouse near an oak tree at present-day Tenino City Park. The new school expanded twice in 1890 and 1908 after population increases in the community and by 1909, high school studies were introduced up to 9th grade; high school student enrollment was 14. A gymnasium and larger building were added in 1917. A high school was completed in 1924, with a gym added the following year.

== Arts and culture ==
=== Festivals and events ===
Inspired by a mayoral proclamation in 1968 for Tenino to honor pioneer history and culture, the city began holding an annual weekend "Oregon Trail Days" festival. The original directive asked the gentlemen of the community not to shave but men could opt out by purchasing a "beardless permit" for $2. Demonstrations of logging, blacksmithing, railroad work, and pioneer home life often highlight the event. "Black powder shoots", historical exhibits, live music, cuisine, vintage car shows, and a parade round out the celebration. Several other organizations, such as the local farmer's market and rock-and-gem shows, will often hold events concurrently throughout the city.

The Tenino Farmers Market is held annually between early May and the end September. It is part of the Washington State Farmers Market Association and holds special market events for Mother's Day and Father's Day.

=== Historic buildings and sites ===
In 2020, Tenino created the "Tenino Creative Arts District" by certification thru the Washington state Arts Commission. The area, designated as including the historic downtown, business district, and the entirety of Tenino City Park, is projected to include public art of various mediums, including murals and metal banners and signs depicting Tenino's history. A scavenger hunt is to be based on the artworks. The banners, 23 in total, were added to light poles in the downtown district in October 2023.

De Beers heiress, Rebecca L. Oppenheimer, built a luxury home Merkaba near Tenino. In 2023, it was sold for $2.3M to former child actor, Scott Strader.

There are 26 historic sites in or near Tenino. Following are some of those properties.

Name	Image	Address	Built in	NRHP?	Notes
Tenino Downtown Historic District		Two blocks long, one-half block-deep on either side of Sussex Street; approximately three acres in size.		June 25, 2004	Sussex Street is the main thoroughfare of the community and is also part of State Route 507.
Tenino Depot		Tenino City Park		December 27, 1974	The Tenino Depot, now a museum, was moved from its original site to the Tenino City Park near the Tenino Stone Company Quarry. At the time the Depot was moved, the area of relocation was examined to ensure that no archaeological remains significant to the operation of the quarry would be destroyed or altered.
Hercules Sandstone Company Office					Originally located near the Hercules Sandstone Company Quarry west of Tenino, In 1922, each stone of the building was numbered, moved separately, and reassembled at it current site at the corner of Sussex and Hodgen. It is currently Tenino's City Hall.
Tenino Stone Company Quarry		2712 Huston Street	1891	July 28, 1983	Located in the Tenino City Park, the quarry is now the Memorial Swimming Pool.
Ticknor School		3212 SE Skookumchuck Road now at 399 Park Avenue West	1934	May 10, 1990	Now located in the Tenino City Park, the school was moved from it original location in unincorporated Thurston County to the Tenino City Park next to the Tenino Depot in 2002.
Ticknor Barn		6710 Skookumchuck Road	1860		
Colvin Farmstead (Colvin House)		16828 Old Highway 99	1877	June 23, 1988	
Hercules#2/Eureka Quarry		4220 SE Old Military Road	1891		
Taylor Farm		2400 SE 180th Avenue	1902		
Morgan Davies Barn		S Skookumchuck Road of the junction with Johnson Creek	1910		
Engstrom House/Weber House		3741 SW 143rd Ave	1910		
Violet Prairie Grange		17104 SE Violet Prairie Road	1935		
Ada's Resort		4005 SE 120th Avenue	1939		
Linklater Ranch		13911 Military Road Southeast			
Bronson Resort		4122 SE 119th Avenue	1915		Located on Offut Lake
Offut Lake Resort		4005 SE 120th Avenue	1939		

=== Theater ===
A non-profit theater group, known as the Tenino Young-at-Heart Theatre (TYT), was formed in 1990 and produces live performances at various locations throughout the city. The TYT purchased land, with help from an anonymous donor, near the high school in 2021 with plans to build a performing arts center.

=== Tourism ===
The city is home to the Tenino Sandstone Walking tour which honors the community's sandstone past. Local stone carver shops, and the sculptures they produce, are the main attraction of the tour. Tenino provides options for visitors to tour the city, or travel on the Yelm–Rainier–Tenino Trail, be means of the Yellow Bike project, a bicycle-sharing system started by the city in 2001.

== Parks and recreation ==
Tenino is home to Wolf Haven International, and as of 2024, the only wolf sanctuary in the world accredited with the Global Federation of Animal Sanctuaries (GFAS).

The South Sound Speedway, a Figure 8 racetrack, is immediately southwest of the downtown area.

=== Tenino City Park ===
The largest park in the community is Tenino City Park. Listed at 128 acres (52 ha), the park sits south of the center of town, with the Yelm–Rainier-Tenino Trail crossing through the area. The park contains the Tenino Stone Quarry community pool, the renovated Quarry House, and the Tenino Depot Museum, along with various ballfields and picnic areas. The grounds were expanded by 13 acres (5.3 ha) during a 2011 "Save Our Park" movement to save land and trails existing behind the park footprint from being logged.

A supplemental appropriation of over $500,000 was awarded to the city in 2022 for the rebuild of the Tenino City Park's playground after damage from a winter storm the prior year. The new play area, named Maytown Community Playground, was opened in 2023. An additional improvement that year to the park was the installation of three pump tracks of various difficulty levels. The tracks were built using funds from the American Rescue Plan Act of 2021. The grounds were expanded once again in 2024 with the addition of an adjacent 60-acre (24 ha) woodland parcel using funds donated from a conservancy foundation.

In July 2026, the Tenino Veterans Honor Roll Memorial Wall was officially dedicated at the park. The effort, which took over a decade, was funded by donations from residents and various veterans groups. The memorial wall, 7 feet (2.1 m) in height and 13 feet (4.0 m) long, was constructed out of Tenino sandstone as well as other various rock, such as Wilkeson sandstone, Pennsylvania Bluestone, and granite. Carvers from a Tenino guild helped to install the monument which is located outside the entrance to the quarry pool. The wall replaced an original veterans monument that honored graduates of Tenino High School who served in wartime. Made of wood, the original memorial had eventually deteriorated.

== Media ==
Tenino once had a local newspaper known as The Independent. The independent movie, The Mountain, with Jeff Goldblum, was partially filmed in Tenino.

== Infrastructure ==
Tenino is situated along the old route of Highway 99 which bisected the town. The community's fortunes and growth waned, with traffic being diverted away from Tenino after the construction of Interstate 5 in the 1950s and 1960s.

Into the 2000s, Tenino was bereft of a local sewer system with most residences and businesses relying on septic. A master plan for a centralized system, including a waste treatment facility, was introduced by the town council in 2002.

The community is served by ruralTRANSIT, a free bus service provided by the Thurston Regional Planning Council. The transportation system into South Thurston County has been in place since the mid-2000s and provides access to other transit operations, including Intercity Transit and Lewis County Transit.

== Notable people ==
- Adam Craig, American country music singer-songwriter

== See also ==
- Wolf Haven International
- Yelm–Rainier–Tenino Trail
- Monarch Contemporary Art Center and Sculpture Park
