= Mottman Building =

- U.S. National Register of Historic Places
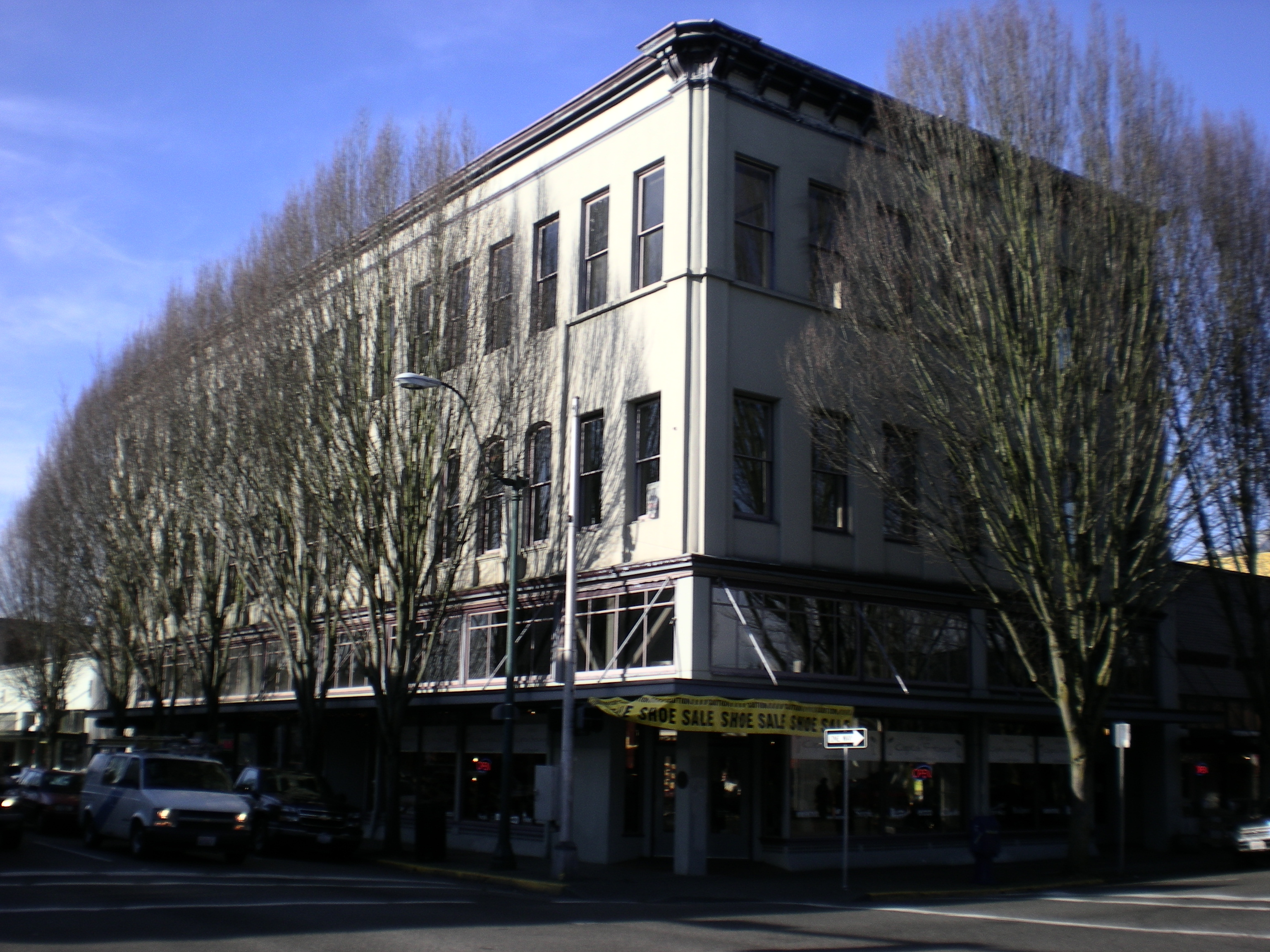

- Location within Washington (state) Location within the United States
- Location: 101 Capitol Way N, Olympia, Washington
- Coordinates: 47°02′42″N 122°54′02″W
- Area: less than one acre
- Built: 1888, 1911
- Architect: Heath & Gove (1911 reconstruction)
- Architectural style: Italianate (Altered)
- NRHP reference No.: 83003354
- Added to NRHP: June 16, 1983

The Mottman Building is an historic commercial building located at the Northwest corner of Capitol Way N & 4th Ave W in downtown Olympia, Washington. Originally constructed in 1888 as the Olympic Block by Samuel Williams for Toklas & Kaufman to house their department store, the building was remodeled and expanded to its current state in 1911 by prominent Olympia realtor and eventual mayor George Mottman, whose own department store, the Mottman Mercantile, occupied the building until 1967. It was listed on the National Register of Historic Places in 1983.

== History ==
The original occupant of the Mottman Building was the dry goods store of Gallewski Kaufman, one of the state's most prominent mercantile men in the later 19th century. With partner Ferdinand Toklas they ran Olympia's (and reportedly Southwest Washington's) largest dry goods house, the New York Cash Store. Toklas, who had strong retail connections in New York, was also a partner in Toklas & Singerman (The San Francisco Store), Seattle's largest dry goods house at the time dating back to the early 1870s. With Kaufman and his children, Toklas would later open a branch stores in Spokane (The Great Eastern Store) and Aberdeen and build that city's first brick building in 1891. In Olympia, Toklas and Kaufman opened their original store at the southeast corner of Capitol Way S and 4th Ave E but they soon outgrew the space and in 1888, Toklas' son Nathan, recently returned from running their Spokane store, convinced them to have their own building constructed, eventually choosing the opposite corner of the intersection. They coordinated with Samuel Williams to build a large two-story building on his prominent corner lot previously occupied by Williams' family home and hardware store. The Williams house was moved off of the lot and ground was broken in May 1888 and the building was mostly completed by November by contractor J.W. Roberts. They christened the building the Olympic Block, after the city but it was still commonly referred to as the Williams Block. Italianate in design with cast-iron details and a galvanized iron cornice, manufactured locally, the new building would be fully occupied by the dry goods store. A unique feature of the original building was a detached 2-story brick lavatory, that was accessed by a Skyway from the second story. An unadorned 1-story brick building directly to the north was built by Williams in tandem with the Olympic to fill the lot between it and the brick Olympic Hardware Company building. The total cost of the two buildings at the time was $18,000 (roughly $493,000 in 2020).

In 1894, Toklas retired and turned the Olympia and Aberdeen stores over to Kaufman and his sons. 1 year later George A. Mottman started his own dry goods store in the Stewart Block, once located at the Northeast corner of Capitol Way S & Legion Way SE. Mottman, a native of Germany who came to Olympia in 1884 and would later serve as mayor, had worked as a clerk for Toklas & Kaufman for several years upon arriving in Olympia before going into the real estate field. Within a few years of opening Mottman's had replaced Kaufman's as Olympia's leading department store and when Kaufman retired in 1899, Mottman purchased the building and moved his store into the space. In 1911, he commissioned Tacoma architects Heath & Gove to completely remodel the building by opening up the first floor storefronts and adding a third floor which included the installation of Olympia's first elevator. The renovations involved removal of much of the cast iron elements and smoothing away most of the original architectural details however the original cornice was saved and reattached to the third floor. With the Olympic lettering removed the building became known as the Mottman Building. The building survived the 1949 Olympia earthquake with significant damage but unlike many of Olympia's other 19th-century structures, retained all of its floors. Mottman's continued to operate in the building until going out of business in 1967.
