= Gate School (Gate, Washington) =

- U.S. National Register of Historic Places
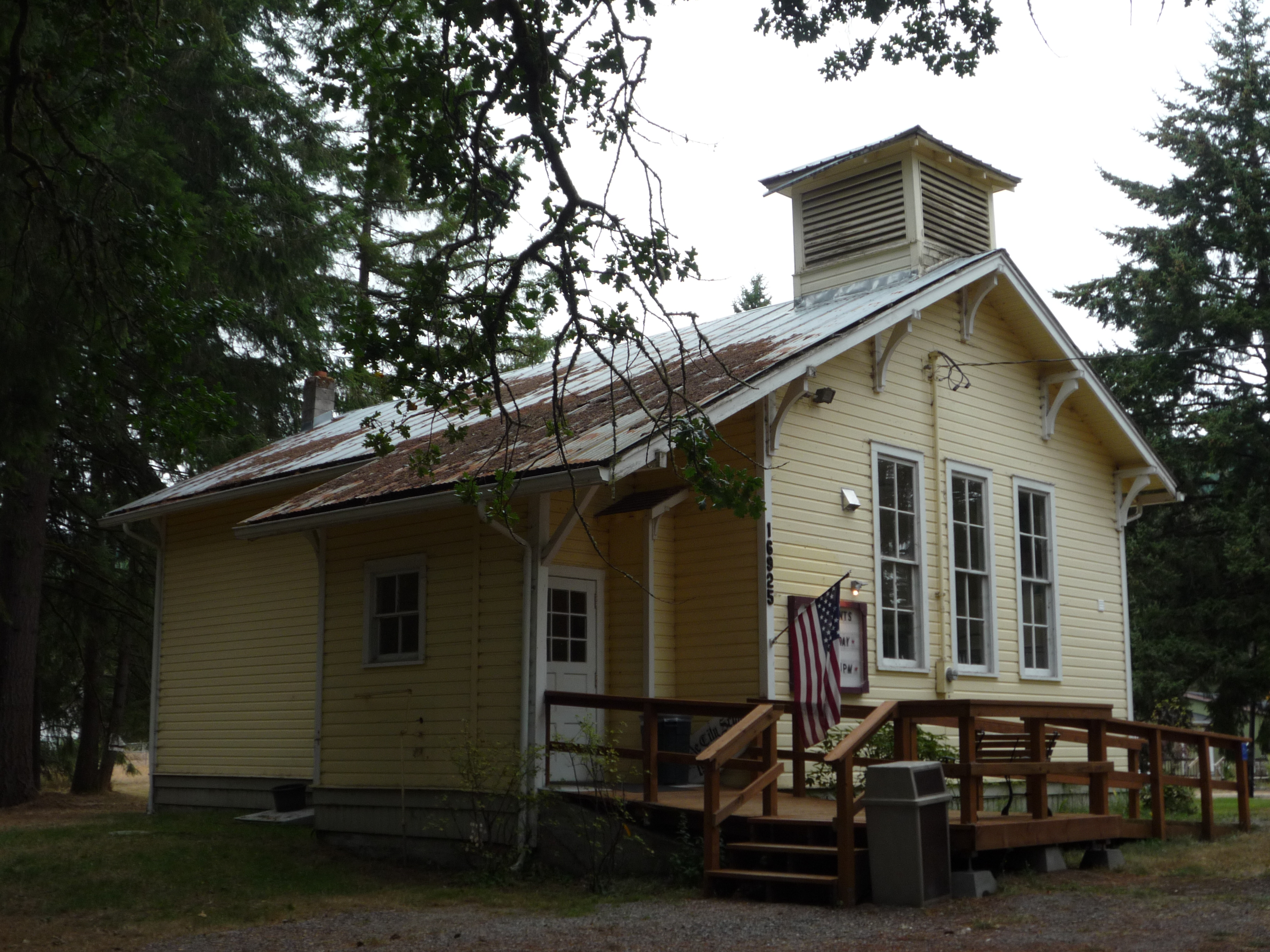

- Location within Washington (state) Location within the United States
- Nearest city: Gate, Washington
- Coordinates: 46°50′19″N 123°8′17″W
- Area: 2.3 acres (0.93 ha)
- Built: 1910
- Architectural style: Vernacular gable roof
- MPS: Rural Public Schools of Washington State MPS
- NRHP reference No.: 90001094
- Added to NRHP: July 19, 1990

The Gate School is the historic former school in Gate, Washington and is listed on the National Register of Historic Places (NRHP).

== History ==
The one room schoolhouse was built in 1910. It served students from first to eighth grade until the school consolidated with Rochester's school district in 1941-1942. The school building became a community center, continuing to do so as of 2024. The school has been preserved by the Gate Community Club since 1944 and the site was added to the National Register of Historic Places on July 19, 1990.

== Architecture and features ==
The frame building features a gable roof, eaves with decorative brackets, exposed rafter tails, a brick chimney, and a square bell tower. As of 2024, the schoolhouse retains its original blackboards and hardwood fir floors, cut and milled from a logging camp in nearby Bordeuax. Replica desks and benches were built to simulate the school's early aesthetics. The lumber used for the benches may have been boards taken from the original Gate train depot.
