= Bordeaux, Washington =

Ghost town in Washington (state)

- Ghost town
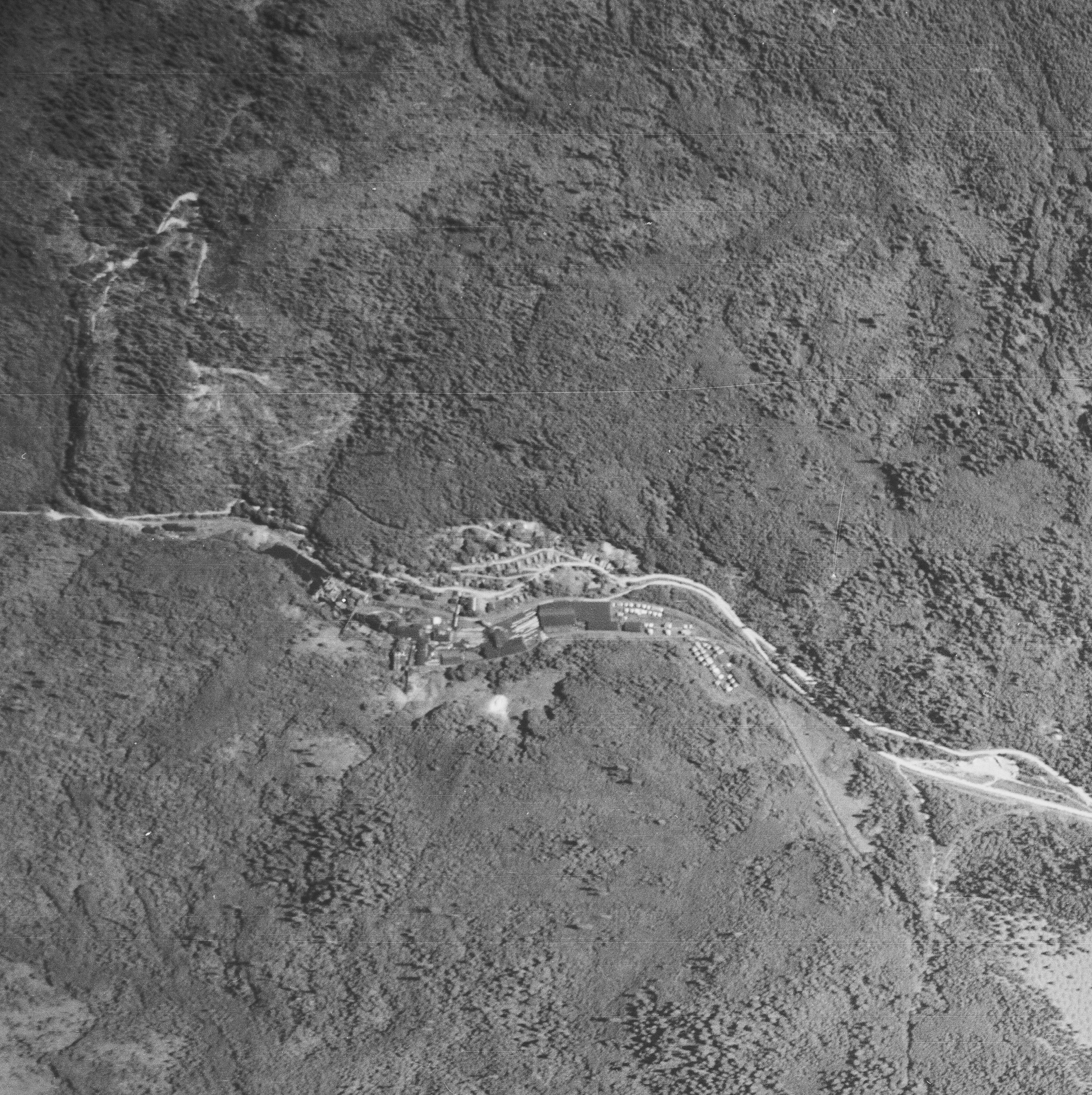
- Bordeaux in June 1941
- Interactive map of Bordeaux, Washington
- Coordinates: 46°53′41″N 123°04′49″W
- Country: United States
- State: Washington
- County: Thurston
- Established: 1903
- Time zone: UTC-8 (Pacific (PST))
  - Summer (DST): UTC-7 (PDT)

Bordeaux is a ghost town in Thurston County, in the U.S. state of Washington. The town was abandoned in the 1940s after local timber had been extracted from the area.

== History ==
A post office called Bordeaux was established in 1903, and remained in operation until 1942. The community was named after Thomas Bordeaux, a businessman in the lumber industry. At the town's peak, the population reached approximately 400 people and contained a hotel, several mills and facilities for timber processing, and company housing.

Lumber operations ended in the 1940s once the timber had been extracted, and the town's population dwindled. When the town's sawmill shut down in the mid-20th century, its last remaining inhabitants abandoned it. The site of Bordeaux is now located on private property which is inaccessible to the public.
