= Tenino station =

- Tenino Depot
- U.S. National Register of Historic Places
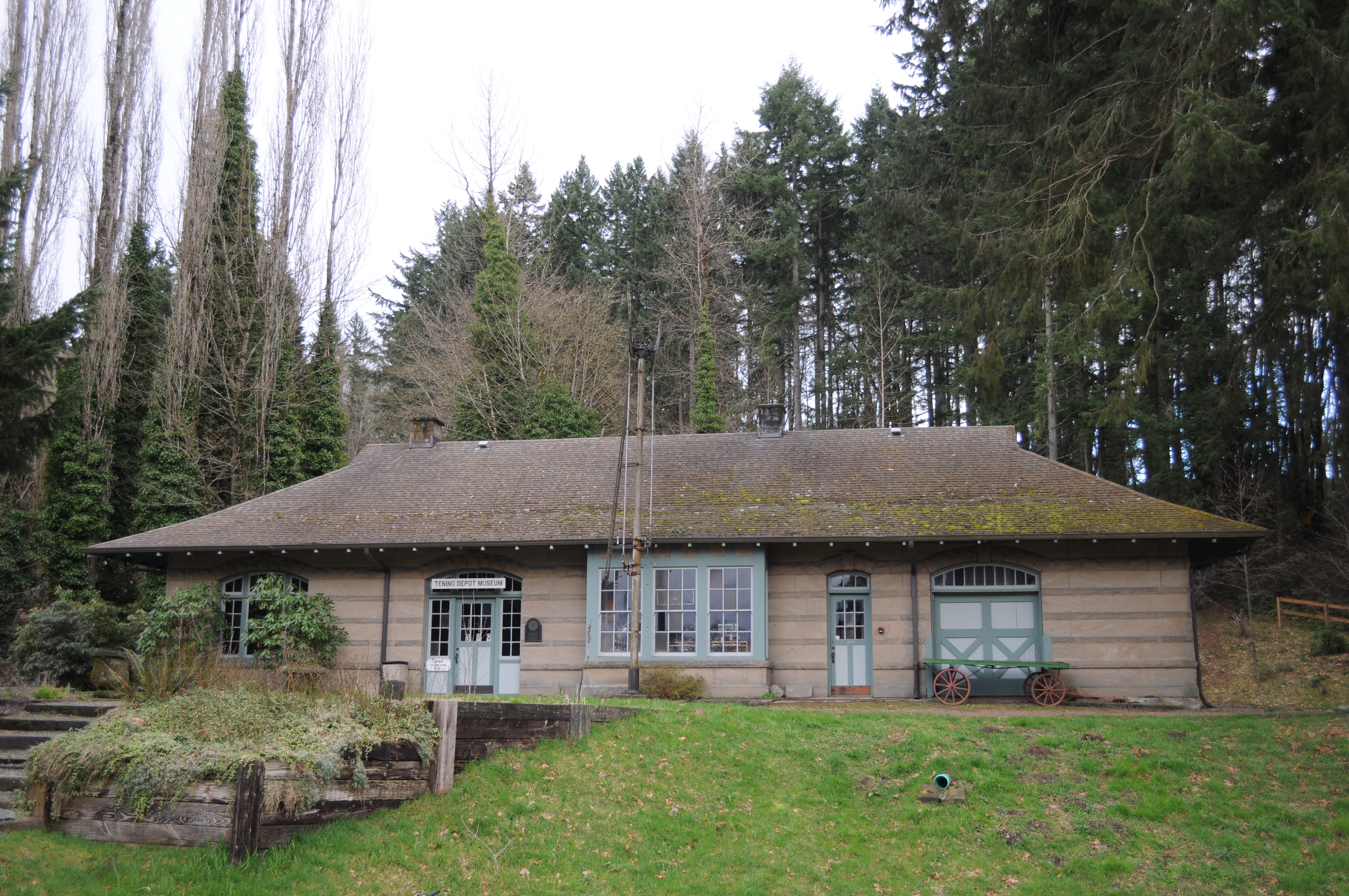

- Location within Washington (state)
- Location: 399 Park Ave W Tenino, Washington
- Coordinates: 46°51′16″N 122°51′14″W
- Built: 1914
- Architect: Luther Twichel
- Architectural style: Modernized Richardsonian
- NRHP reference No.: 74001982
- Added to NRHP: December 27, 1974

Tenino Station, also known as the Tenino Depot, located in Tenino, Washington, was built by the Northern Pacific Railway in 1914 along the mainline from Portland, Oregon to Tacoma, Washington. The Tenino Depot was added to the National Register of Historic Places in 1974.

== History ==
The depot ceased serving passengers in the 1950s, but continued to handle freight into the 1960s. It was finally closed in 1965. The depot remained abandoned. In 1975, the Burlington Northern Railroad (the successor of the Northern Pacific) gave the depot to the City of Tenino instead of demolishing it as a surplus property. The city began efforts to create an historic district by April of that year, suggesting moving the building in 1975 next to the Quarry House and the Tenino Stone Company Quarry.

The city refurbished the depot and turned it into the Tenino Depot Museum, a museum of local history. Exhibits include a press used to make the original wood money, logging and quarry tools, railroad memorabilia, a 1920s doctor's office, and local antiques and historic artifacts. The museum is open weekend afternoons.

== Architecture and features ==
The depot is rectangular in shape and is made out of the local sandstone. (The sandstone quarry located east of the rail line was also listed in the National Register of Historic Places.) The architecture is a modernized Richardsonian style with simplified stone coursework and arched windows. The depot had a passenger waiting area on one end and a freight room on the other. The agent's office was located between the two rooms.

== Significance ==
The depot was listed in the National Register due to its association with the development of Tenino as well as its association with the development of railroads in Washington.

Preceding station	Great Northern Railway	Following station
Bucoda toward Portland	Portland–Seattle Line	Plumb toward Seattle
Preceding station	Northern Pacific Railway	Following station
Bucoda toward Portland	Portland–Seattle Line	Plumb toward Seattle
Preceding station	Union Pacific Railroad	Following station
Bucoda toward Portland	Portland–Seattle Line	Plumb toward Seattle
