= Tenino Downtown Historic District =

Historic district in Washington, United States

- U.S. National Register of Historic Places
- U.S. Historic district
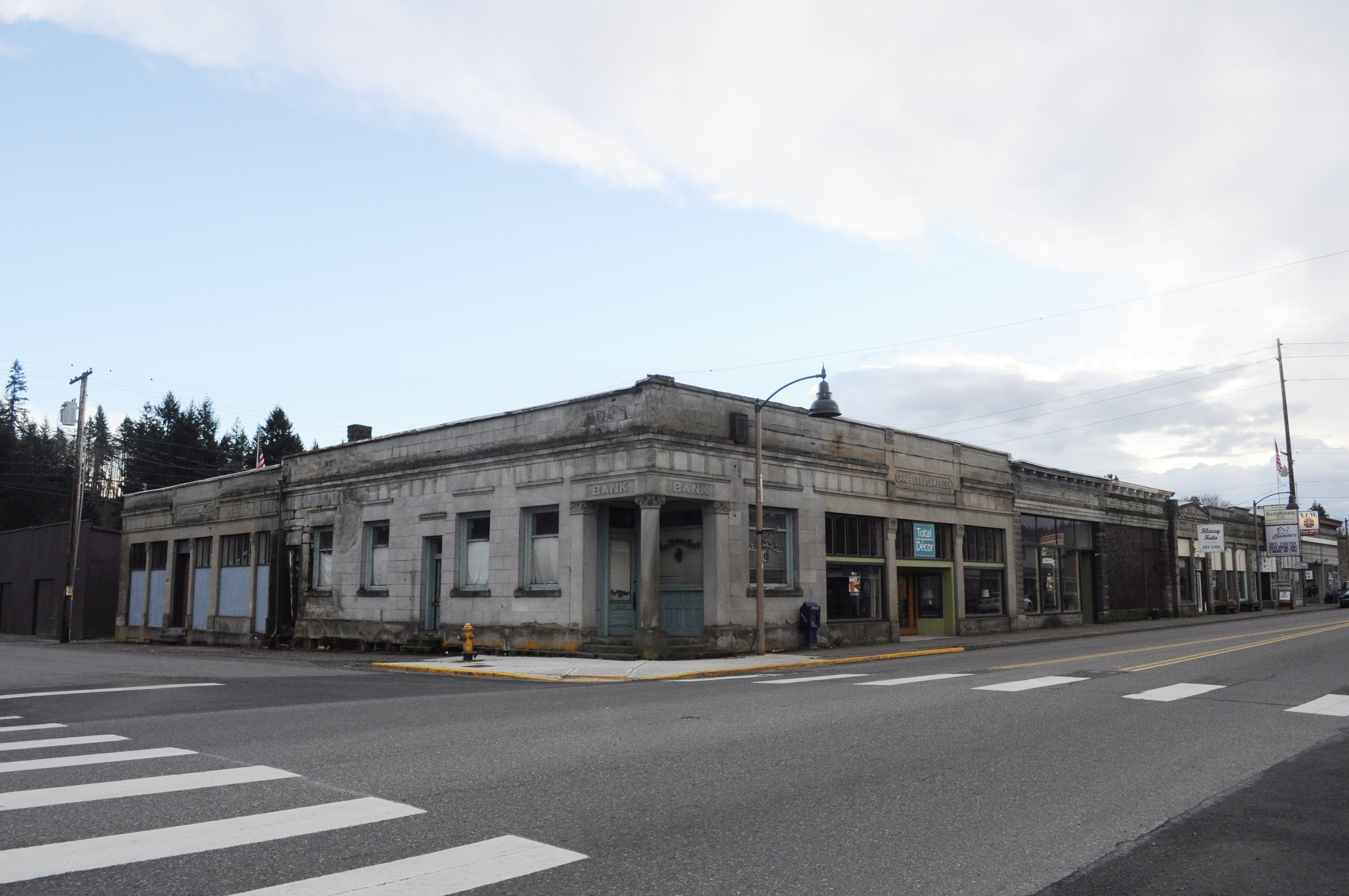
- Tenino Downtown Historic District, 2011

- Location within Washington (state)
- Location: Sussex Street SE, Tenino, Washington
- Coordinates: 46°51′25″N 122°51′7″W
- Area: 3 acres (1.2 ha)
- Built: 1904
- NRHP reference No.: 02001616
- Added to NRHP: June 25, 2004

The Tenino Downtown Historic District is two blocks long, one-half block-deep on either side of Sussex Street in Tenino, Washington. Approximately three acres in size, the district was added to the National Register of Historic Places on June 25, 2004. Sussex Street is the main thoroughfare through Tenino and is also part of Washington State Route 507.

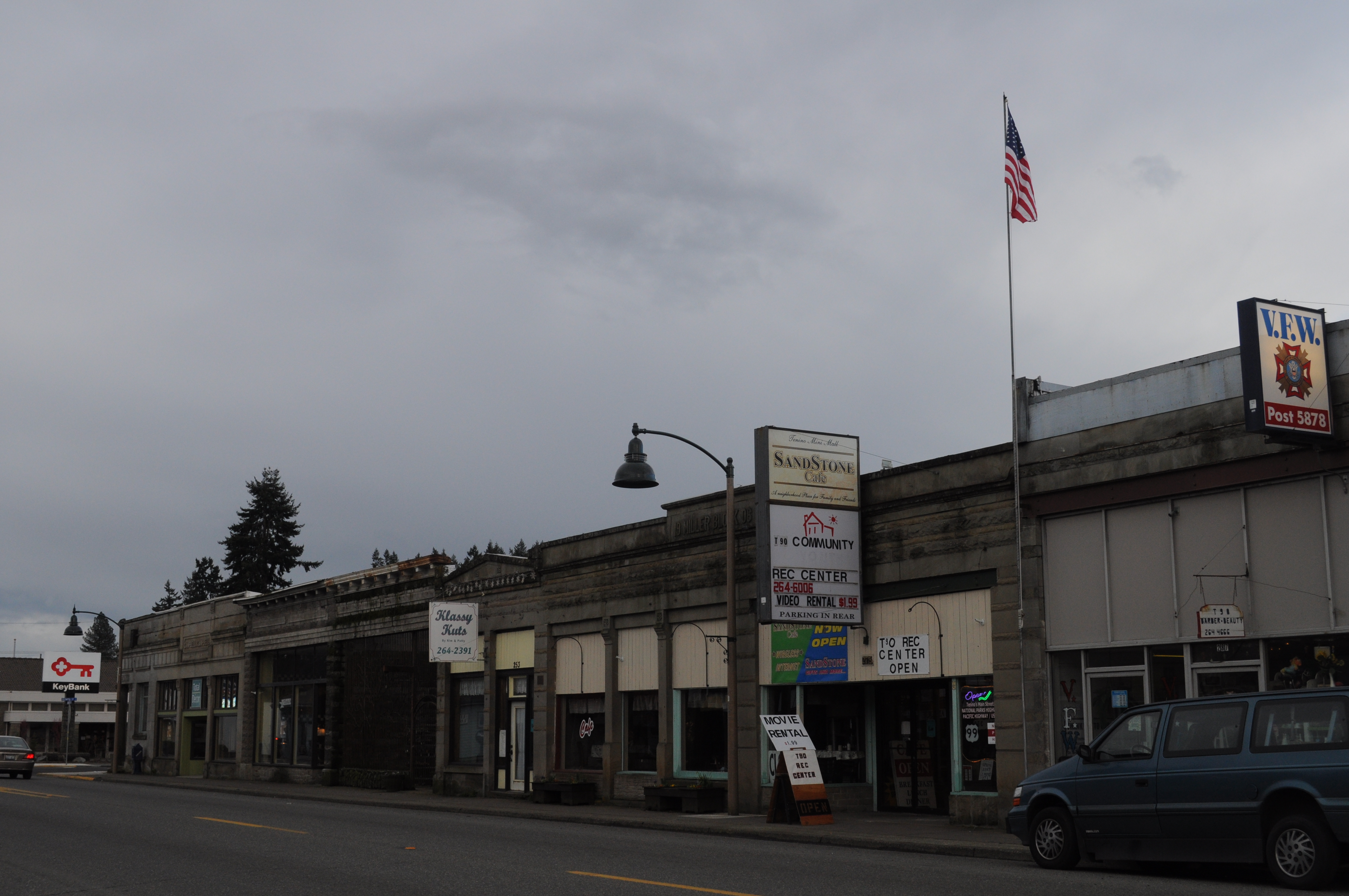
(Left to right) the State Bank of Tenino on the far corner is nestled into the L-shaped Campbell & Campbell Building. Except for its façade, the Mentzner & Coping Block was gutted by fire in 1983; only the leftmost of the two storefronts has been rebuilt. The Miller Block (three storefronts, the one at left with a distinct capital). The VFW Hall/Liberty Theater.

Contributing properties include the State Bank of Tenino, built in 1908; Campbell and Campbell Store, built in 1906–07; Mentzner and Coping Block, built in 1914; Miller Block, built in 1906; VFW Hall/Liberty Theater, built in 1914; Columbia Building, built in 1906; Wolf Building, built in 1908; Henderson and Davis Garage, built in 1924; Masonic Temple, built in 1921; Skaggs Store, built in 1925; Tenino Telephone Office, built in 1925; Wichman Office, built in 1904; and the Russell Building, built in 1908. Other significant but non-contributing buildings in the district are the Mandery-Martin Building, built in 1925 and Jiffy Lunch, built in 1923.

It includes a Masonic Lodge built in 1921, one of few two-story buildings in the district.

The Masonic Lodge in Tenino was built in 1921.
