= Tenino (sternwheeler) =

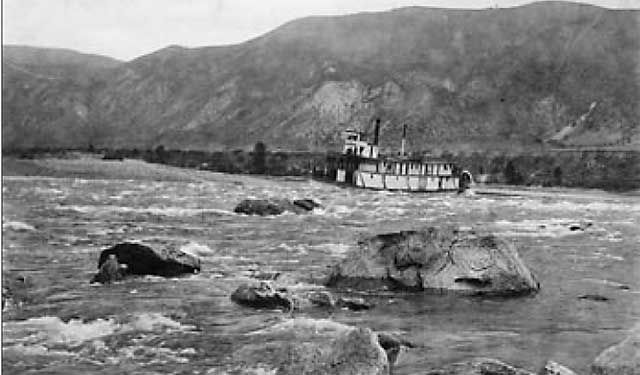
- Tenino

History
- Name: Tenino; later, New Tenino
- Owner: Oregon Steam Navigation Company
- Port of registry: US 24491; after 1876 rebuild: US 130067
- Builder: R.R. Thompson and Eugene F. Coe
- In service: 1861
- Out of service: 1879
- Fate: Dismantled at Celilo
- Notes: First steamboat to operate on Columbia River above The Dalles

General characteristics
- Type: shallow draft, inland passenger/freighter, wooden hull
- Tonnage: 329 gross
- Length: 135 ft (41 m); after 1869 rebuild: 136 ft (41 m): after 1876 rebuild: 136 ft (41 m)
- Beam: 25 ft (8 m); after 1869 rebuild: 26 ft (8 m); after 1876 rebuild: 32 ft (10 m)
- Depth: 5.5 ft (2 m) depth of hold; after 1869 rebuild: 5.9 ft (2 m)
- Installed power: steam, high-pressure boiler, twin engines, horizontally mounted, 17" bore by 72" stroke, 19 horsepower nominal
- Propulsion: sternwheel
- Notes: rebuilt or salvaged as New Tenino

The Tenino was the second steamboat to run on the Columbia River above Celilo Falls and on the Snake River. Following a reconstruction or major salvage in 1876 this vessel was named the New Tenino.

== Design and construction ==
Tenino was built in 1860 by C.L. Barnes at the mouth of the Deschutes River on the upper Columbia River for the Oregon Steam Navigation Company ("OSN"), which by the time Tenino was built was becoming the most powerful transportation company in the American part of the Oregon Country. John Gates, the OSN principal engineer, supervised construction of Tenino and became her first engineer. The engines were new from the OSN shops.

== Operations ==
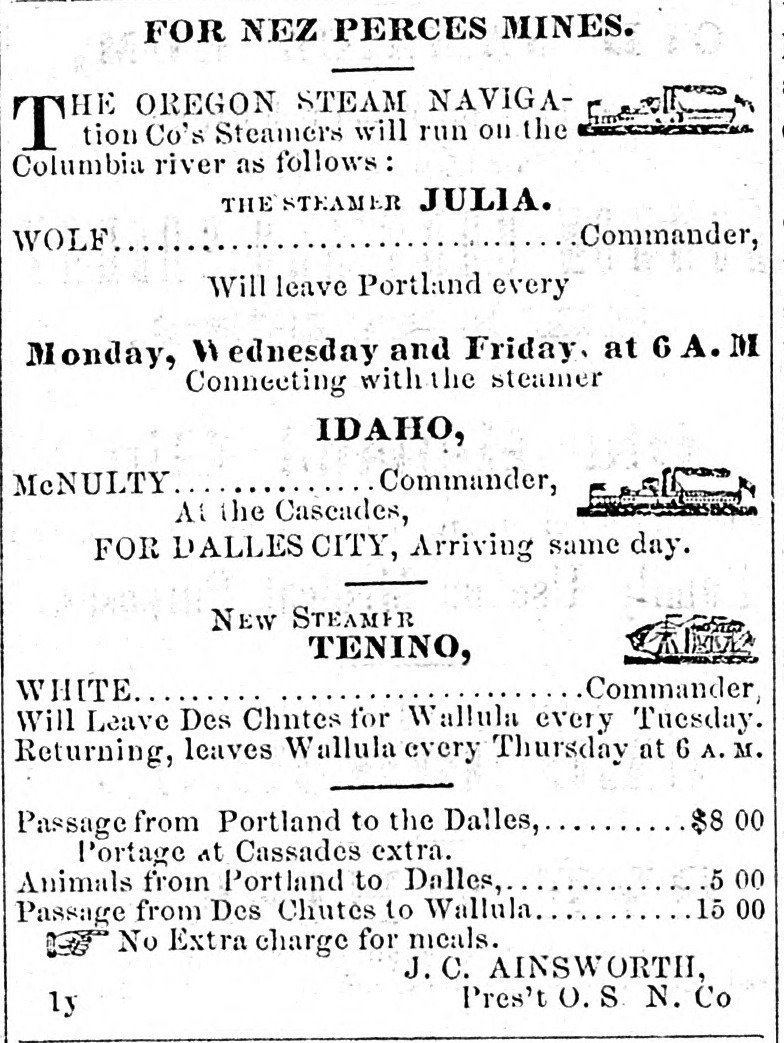
Advertisement for the Tenino and other steamers of the Oregon Steam Navigation Company, published in the Walla Walla Statesman, April 5, 1862.

OSN built Tenino to run with Colonel Wright which was the first steamer on the Columbia above Celilo. Tenino was a bigger and more powerful vessel than Colonel Wright the first steamboat on this stretch of the river. Both boats were owned by the powerful monopoly of the Oregon Steam Navigation Company.

Demand for passage and freight shipments up the Columbia was very great in the early 1860s. Although only a moderate sized vessel, it was not necessary to haul large amounts of cargo for a vessel to be profitable at that time on the river. Tenino proved to be one of the most profitable boats yet to appear on the river. As Professor Mills described it:

[T]he Tenino made money as fast as the purser could collect and stuff it into a carpetbag. On a single upriver run in May, 1862, when the gold rush was at its roaring best, the Tenino gathered in $18,000 for fares, meals, berths and incidentals -- the bar.

Tenino's first captain was Leonard Wright, who had taken Colonel Wright far up the Snake River. Later captains were Charles Felton, E.W. Baughman, J.H.D. Gray, Eugene F. Coe (1842-1893) and Thomas and John Stump. The company ran Tenino hard and by 1867 or 1869 the vessel had to be rebuilt.

== Salvaged or reconstructed ==
In 1876, Tenino struck a rock while moving down river. Her hull was too old to be worth salvaging, so OSN removed the engines and installed them in a new sternwheeler, called the New Tenino. Another source states that Tenino was rebuilt a second time in 1876, and it was this reconstructed vessel that was known as the New Tenino. A reconstruction could be almost the same as building a new vessel, so this may be a matter of characterization of the work. For example, when Rossland on the Arrow Lakes was rebuilt, in the off-season of 1909-10, the upper works were jacked up, the old hull removed, and a new hull slid underneath the old deckhouse structure, which was then lowered down onto the new hull.

== Successor vessel dismantled ==
The New Tenino was dismantled in 1879 at Celilo.

J. E. Akins, Master, Lewiston, Idaho, wrote: “In the year 1880, she was dismantled and the hull towed to Lewiston, where it was used for a wharf boat, until 1884, when an ice gorge in the Snake River tore her from her moorings and she was wrecked on an island just below the City of Lewiston.”
