= Old Capitol Building (Olympia, Washington) =

Washington State Capitol Building, 1905-1928

- U.S. National Register of Historic Places
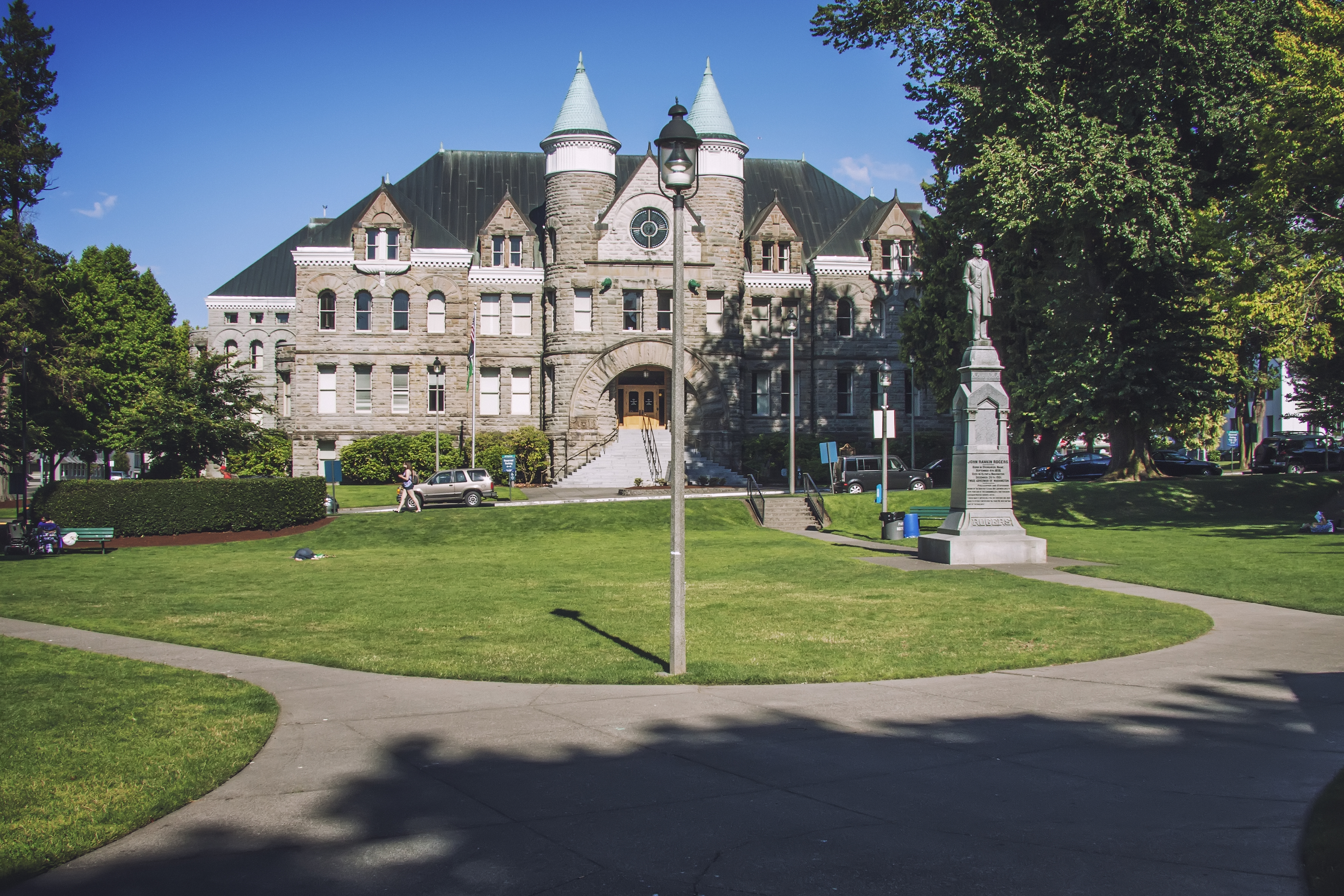
- Interactive map of Old Capitol Building
- Location: 600 Washington Street SE, Olympia, Washington
- Coordinates: 47°2′34.51″N 122°53′58.4″W
- Area: less than one acre
- Built: 1892
- Architect: Willis Ritchie
- Architectural style: Richardsonian Romanesque
- NRHP reference No.: 75001877
- Added to NRHP: May 30, 1975

The Old Capitol Building (originally known as the State Capitol Building) is a historic building in downtown Olympia, Washington. It was built in 1892 and has been listed on the National Register of Historic Places since 1975. It is currently occupied by the Office of the Superintendent of Public Instruction.

== History ==
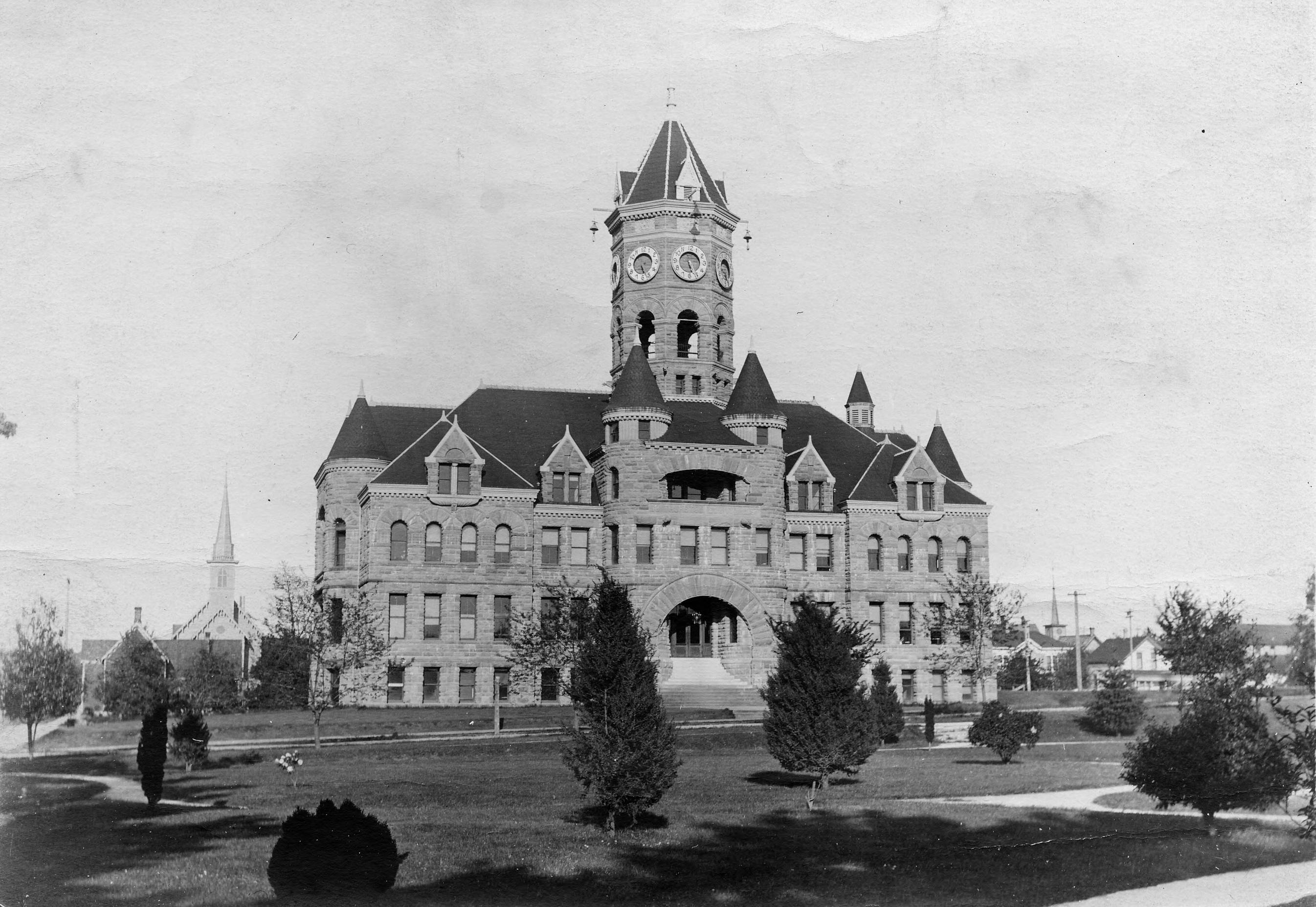
March 1909 issue of Coast Magazine featured the Capitol Building

On December 12, 1890, architect Willis A. Ritchie was selected to develop the new seat of government. Construction began on May 15, 1891 and completed on October 12, 1892, when it was formally accepted as the Thurston County courthouse.

The State Capitol Building was dedicated on January 11, 1905, at Governor Albert Mead's inauguration, and served 1928 as the State Capitol, seat of the legislature of Washington, until 1928.

In 1928, the legislature moved to the current Capitol Building.

=== 1928 fire ===
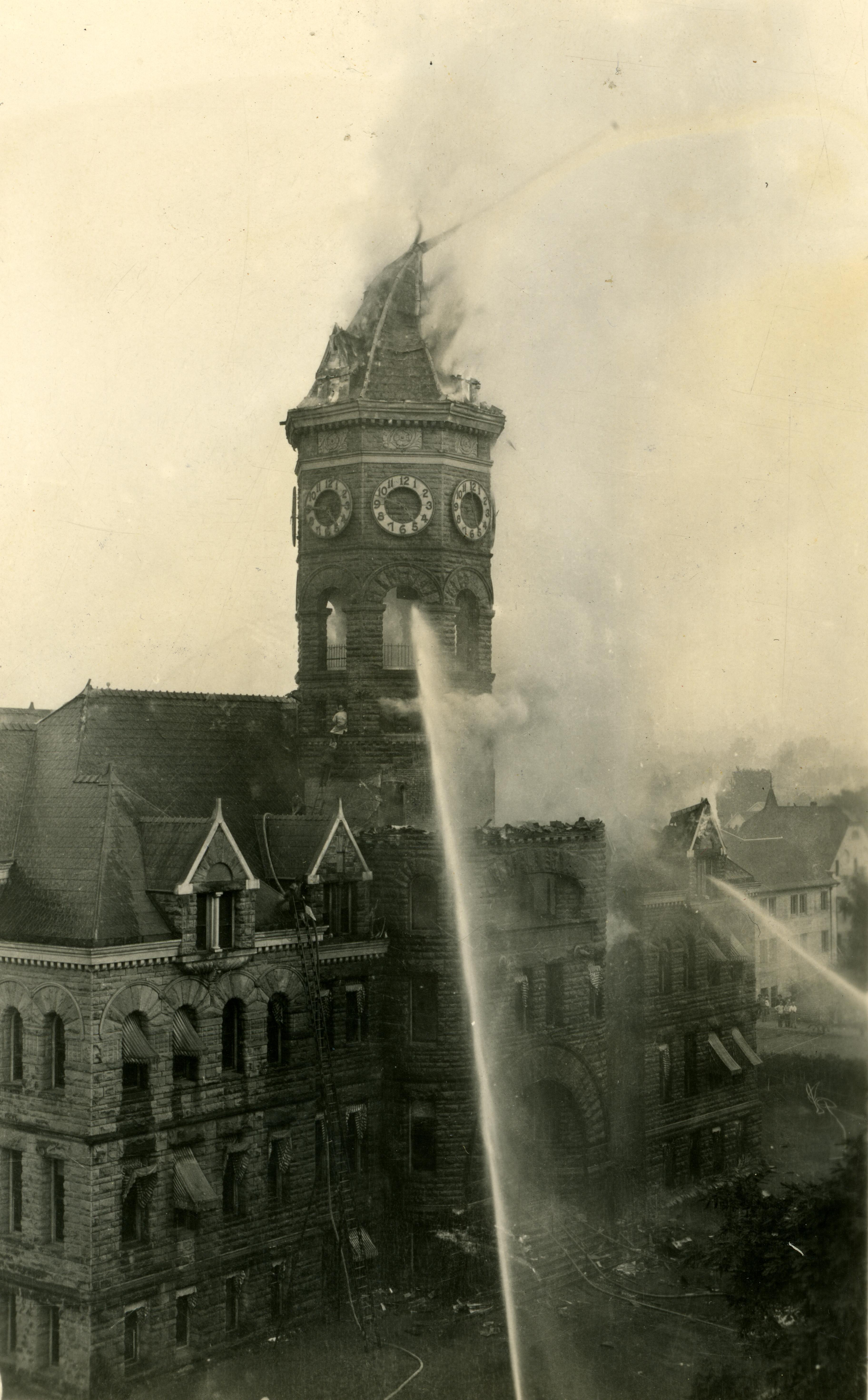
Central tower in flames on September 8, 1928

On Saturday, September 8, 1928, a fire ignited, severely damaging the timber roof framing on the main section of the building, including the loss of a 150 feet (46 m) tall central tower. Additionally, water from fire fighting efforts damaged the building's interior.

Dense smoke was detected at 3:35 p.m. at the base of the tower and roof eaves; all available firefighters in Olympia responded to the emergency. After 20 minutes, Tacoma Fire Department was dispatched to assist, making a 32 miles (51 km) trip across the Pacific Highway to arrive 35 minutes later. The fire was completely put out by 5:30 p.m., and witnessed by approximately 6,500 people from the surrounding streets.

=== 1949 earthquake ===
After the 1949 Olympia earthquake, the building was evacuated and suffered severe damage to its masonry exterior that had to be repaired over the following few months at a cost of $1.1 million. 10 of the 12 towers were lost in the earthquake, along with a rotunda, the House chamber, and several galleries in the East Wing.

== See also ==
- Sylvester Park
- History of Olympia, Washington
- National Register of Historic Places listings in Thurston County, Washington
