= Tenino Stone Company Quarry =

- U.S. National Register of Historic Places
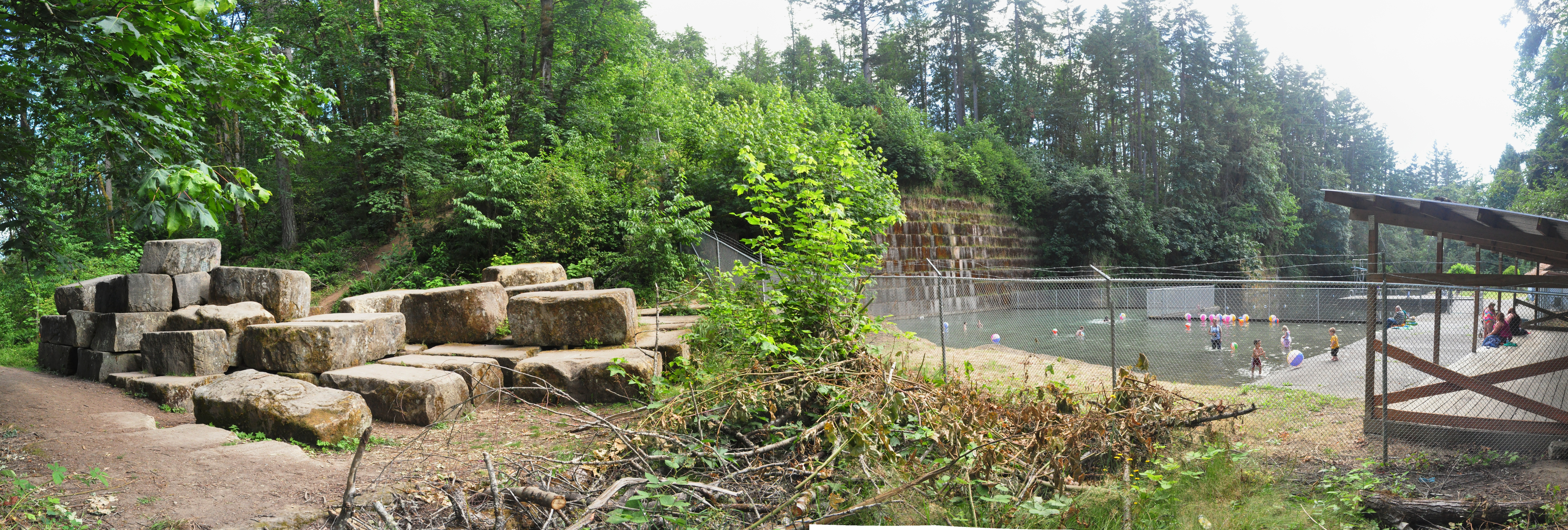

- Location within Washington (state) Location within the United States
- Location: 319 Park Avenue West, Tenino City Park, Tenino, Washington
- Coordinates: 46°51′16″N 122°51′10″W
- Area: 3.4 acres (1.4 ha)
- Website: City of Tenino - Quarry Swimming Pool
- NRHP reference No.: 83003355
- Added to NRHP: July 28, 1983

The Tenino Stone Company Quarry, at City Park in Tenino, Washington, was listed on the National Register of Historic Places (NRHP) in 1983.

The site, officially converted into a community swimming pool by 1950, is a sandstone quarry from which stone was removed in a box shape. Known under other names such as the Memorial Swimming Pool, Quarry Swimming Pool, or the Veteran's Pool, the quarry contains a diving pool and the basin is split into two sections, a shallow area and a deeper pool, large enough to be considered an inland lake.

== History ==
The quarry opened as early as 1889 and closed in the 1920s after the Tenino Stone Company shuttered in 1918. Abandoned, the area was closed and was deemed a no-trespassing zone. The formation filled with spring water and the quarry became an unofficial pool in the community.

There are two proposed causes to the cavities filling with water - that workers in the quarry opened up a natural spring or that personnel turned the pumps off as they left the job in a labor protest, the quarry naturally filling with water.

The quarry was placed on the National Register of Historic Places in 1983.

== Tenino Quarry Pool ==
Tenino purchased the quarry and surrounding acreage in 1946. The area was officially opened as a pool, known as the Tenino Memorial Pool or the Veteran's Pool, by the city on June 8, 1950. (Note: Local reporting also mentions a vague 1940s opening.) It remained without any significant upgrades until a 2018 renovation project funded in part by a grant of $200,000 from Thurston County. The remodeling was completed in 2023 with the addition of a splash park and a combined retaining wall and walkway, and betterments were completed to the decks, docks, and filtration systems. Further renovations were undertaken into 2024 which included additional safety measures and access for disabled people; a large reopening of the facility was in June 2024 as part of the city's Tenino Family Fun Day event.

Due to the nature of the cold waters and depth of the deeper pool of the quarry, swimmers must have passed a swim test or are required to be 18 years or older.

== Features ==
The box-shaped quarry measures about 900 feet (270 m) long, 60 feet (18 m) wide, and up to 100 feet (30 m) deep. (Note: The reported depth of the quarry or the swimming pool varies between 80–100 feet (24–30 m). See sources throughout the article for the discrepancy.) The freshwater temperature averages between 57 °F (14 °C) and 58 °F (14 °C). A waterfall flows over the quarry walls that contains growth of ferns and moss.

The site contains two separate swimming areas. A shallow pool, 2 feet (0.61 m) deep, also contains a spray area. The large pool, used for swimming and diving is measured up to 80 feet (24.4 m) in depth and is deep enough to be considered an inland lake. The site also contains picnic areas and outdoor shower facilities.
