= McAllister Creek =

McAllister Creek may refer to:

- McAllister Creek (Iowa), a stream in Iowa
- McAllister Creek (Puget Sound tributary), a stream in Washington
