= Frye Cove =

Bay in Thurston County, Washington

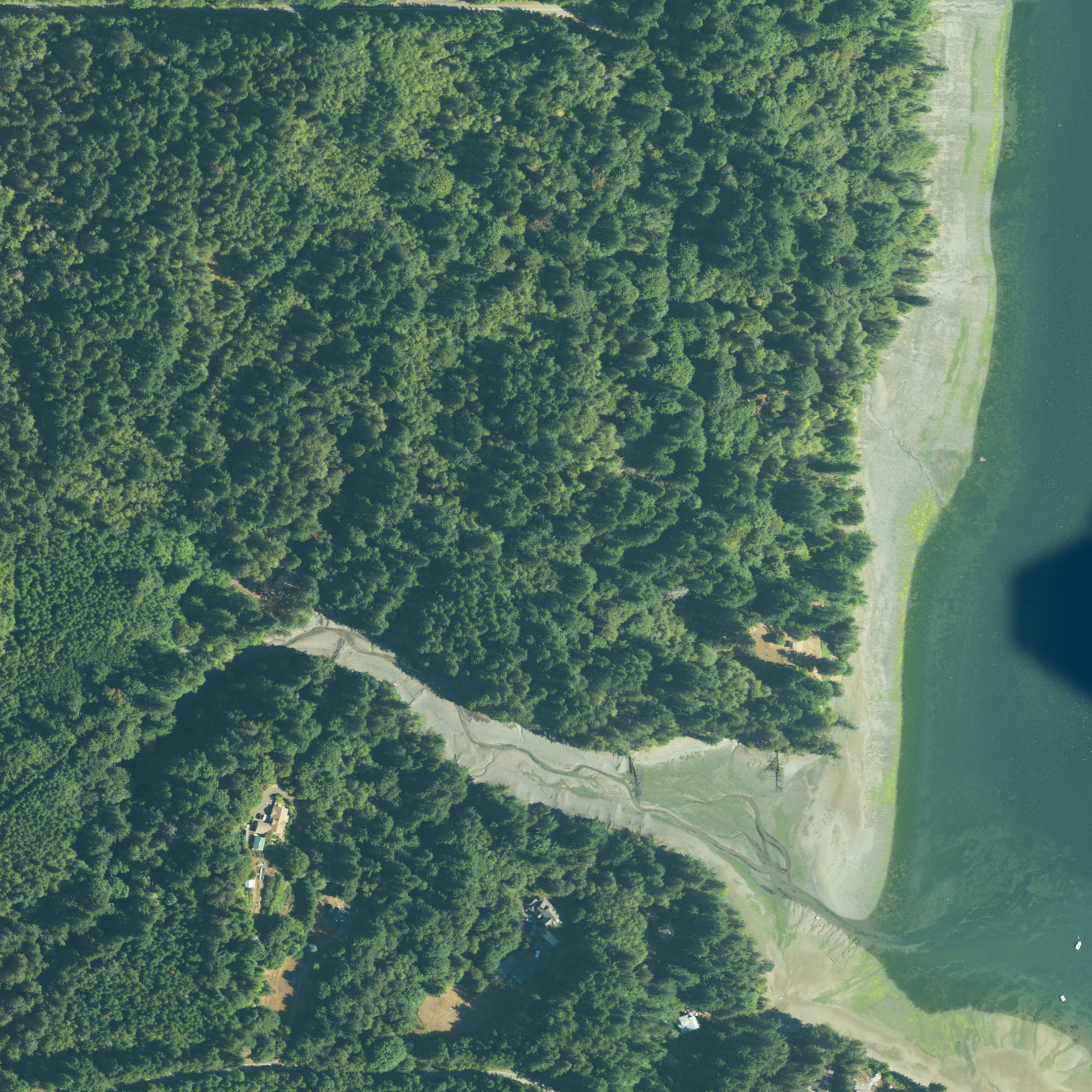
- Frye Cove and Park, August 2023
- Interactive map of Cove location
- Location: Eld Inlet
- Coordinates: 47°06′49″N 122°57′51″W
- Type: Bay

Frye Cove is a bay in the U.S. state of Washington.

== History ==
Frye Cove was named after George W. Frye, a local landowner.

In 2025, efforts were undertaken to remove an artificial reef made of tires that was located in Frye Cove. Containing approximately 15,000 tires, the attempted reef was part of an overall plan between the 1960s and 1980s to strengthen recreational fishing within Puget Sound. The tires were hypothesized to be used as a habitat for overfished aquatic wildlife, such as lingcod; surveys noted that the reef was not being used as such. The tires spread after polypropylene twine holding the tire bundles in place dissolved, becoming a damaging, negative environmental impact. Approximately 2,000 tires were removed by crane in October 2026.

== Recreation ==
Thurston County Parks operates Frye Cove (County) Park on the coast adjacent to the cove. Amenities include a public beach, picnic tables and a playground. It was acquired by Thurston County in 1973.

== See also ==
- List of geographic features in Thurston County, Washington
