= Medicine Creek =

Medicine Creek may refer to:

- Medicine Creek (Missouri), a stream in Missouri
- Medicine Creek (Republican River), a stream in Nebraska
- Medicine Creek (McAllister Creek tributary), a stream in Washington
- Treaty of Medicine Creek, a 1854 treaty signed in Washington Territory
