= Noski Creek =

Creek in Thurston County, Washington state

Coordinates: 46°58′06″N 123°05′06″W

Noski Creek Noschka Creek
- Etymology: Named after pioneer settler

Basin features
- Geographic Names Information System: 1513180

Noski Creek is a stream in Thurston County in the U.S. state of Washington. It is a tributary to Waddell Creek.

A variant name is "Noschka Creek". The creek was named after a pioneer who settled near it in the 1880s.

== See also ==
- List of geographic features in Thurston County, Washington
