= Simmons Lake =

Simmons Lake may refer to:

- Simmons Lake (Antarctica)
- Simmons Lake (Washington)
- Simmons Lake (British Columbia)
