= Ellis Creek =

Ellis Creek may refer to:

- Ellis Creek (Budd Inlet tributary), Thurston County, Washington
- Ellis Creek (Cape Fear River tributary), Bladen County, North Carolina
