= Simmons Creek =

Creek in Thurston County, Washington state

- Etymology: Simmons family

Physical characteristics
- Mouth
  - location: Eld Inlet
  - coordinates: 47°04′31″N 122°59′49″W

Basin features
- Geographic Names Information System: 1508359

Simmons Creek is a stream in Thurston County in the U.S. state of Washington. It is a tributary to the Eld Inlet.

Simmons Creek was named after the Simmons family, which harvested oysters.

== See also ==
- List of geographic features in Thurston County, Washington
