= Hunters Point =

Hunters Point or Hunter's Point or Hunter Point refers to the following places:

- Bayview-Hunters Point, San Francisco, a neighborhood in San Francisco, California
  - Hunters Point Naval Shipyard, another name for the San Francisco Naval Shipyard
- Hunter's Point, Queens, a neighborhood in New York City
  - Hunterspoint Avenue (LIRR station), a station of the Long Island Rail Road railroad
  - Hunters Point Avenue (IRT Flushing Line), a station of New York City Subway
  - Hunter's Point South, a mixed-use development in Hunter's Point, Queens
- Hunter's Point, Quebec, an Indian settlement
- Hunter Point (Washington)
- Hunter's Point, a bald hilltop at Fremont Older Open Space Preserve.
- Hunters Point, a community in Wilson County Tennessee
