= Dickenson Point =

Point in Puget Sound, Washington state

- Point
- Coordinates: 47°09′54″N 122°51′05″W
- Location: Thurston County, Washington
- Offshore water bodies: Dana Passage
- Etymology: Thomas Dickenson
- GNIS feature ID: 1504477

Dickenson Point is a point in the U.S. state of Washington.

Dickenson Point was named after Thomas Dickenson, a member of an 1841 exploring party.

== See also ==
- List of geographic features in Thurston County, Washington
