= Waddell Creek =

Waddell Creek may refer to:

- Waddell Creek (California)
- Waddell Creek (Black River tributary), a stream in Washington
