= Elbow Lake Creek =

Creek in Thurston County, Washington state

Elbow Lake Creek Elbow Creek
- Etymology: Elbow Lake

Physical characteristics
- Source: Elbow Lake
  - coordinates: 46°50′33″N 122°26′22″W

Basin features
- River system: Nisqually River
- Geographic Names Information System: 1519234

Elbow Lake Creek is a stream in Thurston County in the U.S. state of Washington. It is a tributary to the Nisqually River.

Elbow Lake Creek heads at Elbow Lake, from which it takes its name. A variant name is "Elbow Creek".

== See also ==
- List of geographic features in Thurston County, Washington
