= Kennedy Creek =

Kennedy Creek may refer to:

- Kennedy Creek (Pennsylvania), a tributary of South Branch Tunkhannock Creek
- Kennedy Creek (Totten Inlet tributary), a stream in Washington state
