= Mill Creek (Mima Creek tributary) =

Creek in Thurston County, Washington state

- Etymology: Sawmill once located on creek

Location
- Country: United States
- State: Washington
- County: Thurston County

Physical characteristics
- Source
  - coordinates: 46°53′46″N 123°05′40″W

Basin features
- River system: Mima Creek
- Geographic Names Information System: 1511615

Mill Creek is a stream in Thurston County, Washington. It is a tributary of Mima Creek.

Mill Creek was named for a sawmill along its course.

== See also ==
- List of geographic features in Thurston County, Washington
