= Jeal Point =

Point in Puget Sound, Washington state

- Point
- Coordinates: 47°08′39″N 122°54′00″W
- Location: Boston Harbor, Washington
- Offshore water bodies: Budd Inlet, Zangle Cove
- Etymology: Herbert Jeal
- GNIS feature ID: 1531697

Jeal Point is a point in the U.S. state of Washington.

Jeal Point was named after Herbert Jeal, a pioneer settler.

== See also ==
- List of geographic features in Thurston County, Washington
