= Lake Goodwin (disambiguation) =

Lake Goodwin or Goodwin Lake may refer to various lakes in the United States:

== Populated place ==
- Lake Goodwin, Washington, a census-designated place in Washington

== Bodies of water ==
- Goodwin Lake (Thurston County, Washington)
- Lake Goodwin (Snohomish County, Washington)
