= Shell Point =

Shell Point can refer to:

- Shell Point, Florida, an unincorporated community
- Shell Point, South Carolina, a census-designated place
- Shell Point (Washington), a cape
