= Eaton Creek =

Creek in Thurston County, Washington state

- Etymology: Nathan Eaton

Physical characteristics
- Source
  - coordinates: 46°59′32″N 122°43′36″W

Basin features
- Waterbodies: Lake Saint Clair
- Geographic Names Information System: 1504664

Eaton Creek is a stream in Thurston County in the U.S. state of Washington. It is a tributary to Lake Saint Clair.

Eaton Creek has the name of Nathan Eaton, a pioneer settler.

== See also ==
- List of geographic features in Thurston County, Washington
