= Thirty-eight Infantry Bluff =

Cliff in the State of Washington, US

Coordinates: 47°01′04″N 122°40′32″W

Thirty-eight Infantry Bluff is a cliff along the Nisqually River in the U.S. state of Washington.

Thirty-eight Infantry Bluff was named in honor of the 38th Infantry Regiment (United States), for its role in World War I.

== See also ==
- List of geographic features in Thurston County, Washington
