= Sunwood Lake =

Lake in Thurston County, Washington state

- Location: Thurston County, Washington
- Coordinates: 46°58′12″N 122°46′26″W
- Type: Artificial lake
- Etymology: Named after planned community
- Surface area: 3 acres (1.2 ha)
- References: Geographic Names Information System: 1512846

Sunwood Lake is an artificial lake in the U.S. state of Washington. The lake has a surface area of 3 acres (1.2 ha).

Sunwood Lake was created and named upon the creation of the adjacent planned community. The lake is privately owned.

== See also ==
- List of geographic features in Thurston County, Washington
