= Young Cove =

Bay in Puget Sound, Washington state

Coordinates: 47°06′09″N 122°59′00″W

Young Cove is a bay in the U.S. state of Washington.

Young Cove has the name of Volney Young, a local boat captain.

== See also ==
- List of geographic features in Thurston County, Washington
