= Pitman Lake =

Lake in Thurston County, Washington state

- Location: Thurston County, Washington
- Coordinates: 46°55′03″N 122°53′19″W
- Type: Lake
- Etymology: Jesse Pitman
- Surface area: 27 acres (11 ha)
- Max. depth: 15 feet (4.6 m)
- References: Geographic Names Information System: 1507474

Pitman Lake is a lake in the U.S. state of Washington. The lake has a surface area of 27 acres (11 ha) and reaches a depth of 15 feet (4.6 m).

Pitman Lake has the name of Jesse Pitman, a local landholder.

== See also ==
- List of geographic features in Thurston County, Washington
