= Poncin Cove =

Bay in Puget Sound, Washington state

Coordinates: 47°10′09″N 122°48′45″W

Poncin Cove is a bay in the U.S. state of Washington.

Poncin Cove was named after Gamma Poncin, an early settler and businessman.

== See also ==
- List of geographic features in Thurston County, Washington
