= Hewitt Lake (Washington) =

Lake in Thurston County, Washington state

- Location: Near Tumwater, Lacey, Olympia
- Coordinates: 47°00′07″N 122°52′08″W
- Type: Lake
- Etymology: Judge C. C. Hewitt
- Surface area: 27 acres (11 ha)
- Max. depth: 60 feet (18 m)
- Surface elevation: 430 ft (130 m)
- References: Geographic Names Information System: 1505482

Hewitt Lake is a lake in the U.S. state of Washington. It is 27 acres (11 ha) in size and has a maximum depth of 60 feet (18 m).

Hewitt Lake was named after Judge C. C. Hewitt, an early settler.

== See also ==
- List of geographic features in Thurston County, Washington
- List of lakes in Washington
