= Parsnip Swamp =

Swamp in Thurston County, Washington state

Coordinates: 46°49′52″N 122°25′07″W

Parsnip Swamp is a swamp in the U.S. state of Washington.

Parsnip Swamp was so named on account of parsnip-like plants growing in it.

== See also ==
- List of geographic features in Thurston County, Washington
