= Barnes Lake (Washington) =

Lake in Thurston County, Washington state

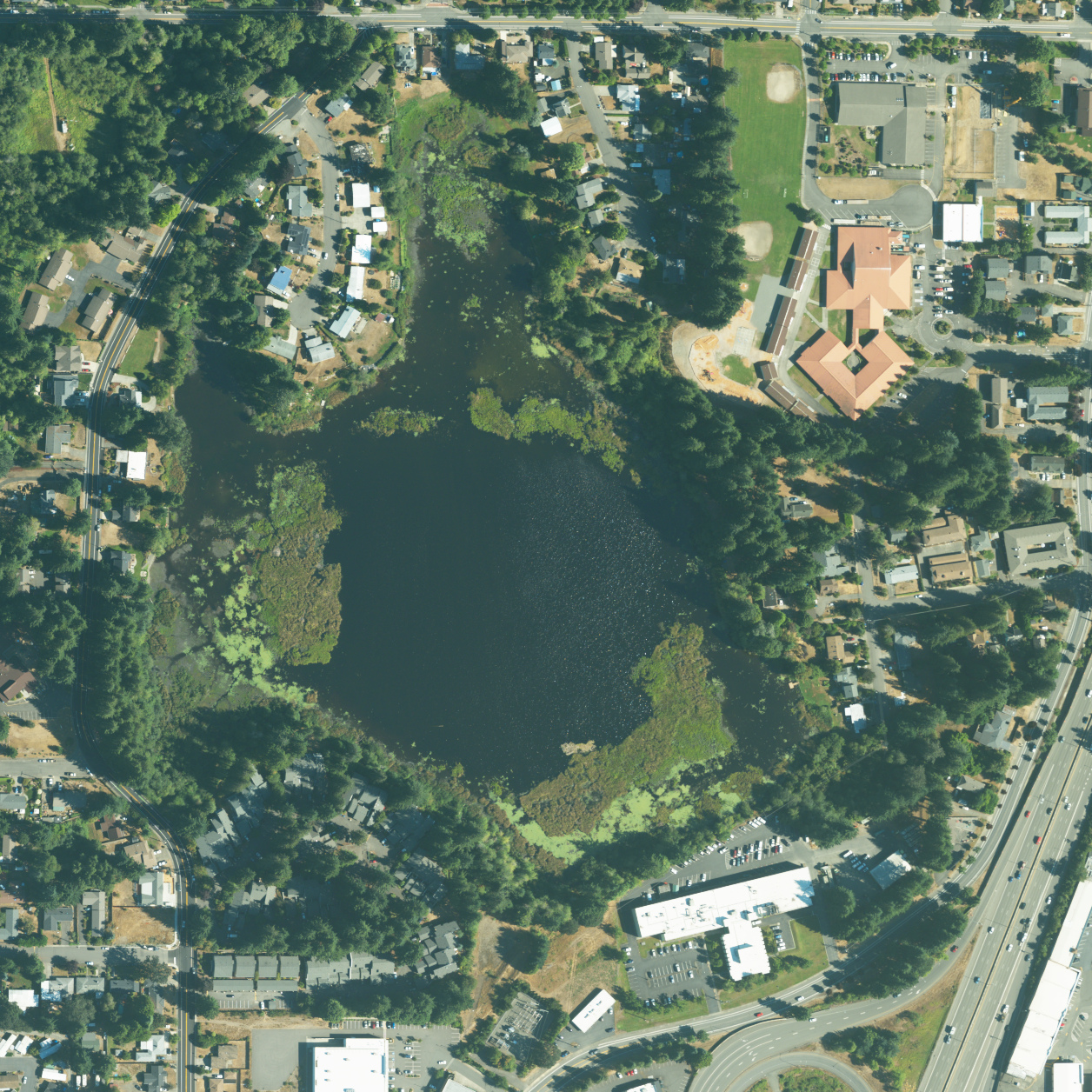
- Barnes Lake in August 2023
- Location: Thurston County, Washington
- Coordinates: 47°00′14″N 122°54′58″W
- Type: Lake
- Surface elevation: 164 feet (50 m)
- References: Geographic Names Information System: 1503180

Barnes Lake is a private lake in the U.S. state of Washington.

Barnes Lake has the name of Nelson Barnes, the proprietor of a slaughterhouse at the lakeside.

== See also ==
- List of geographic features in Thurston County, Washington
