= Thompson Creek (Nisqually River tributary) =

Creek in Pierce and Thurston County, Washington state

- Interactive map of Creek location
- Etymology: Unknown

Location
- Country: United States
- State: Washington
- County: Pierce and Thurston County

Physical characteristics
- Mouth
  - coordinates: 46°58′39.09″N 122°38′17.62″W

Basin features
- River system: Nisqually River
- Geographic Names Information System: 1508997

Thompson Creek is a stream in Pierce and Thurston counties in the U.S. state of Washington. It is a tributary to the Nisqually River. Its source is in Pierce County and its mouth is in Thurston County.

The namesake of Thompson Creek has not been identified.

== See also ==
- List of geographic features in Thurston County, Washington
