= Zenkner Valley =

Valley in Washington, United States

Geography
- Location: Thurston County, Washington
- Coordinates: 46°45′20″N 122°57′10″W
- Interactive map of Zenkner Valley

Zenkner Valley is a valley in the U.S. state of Washington.

Zenkner Valley was named after Austin Zenkner, who settled in the valley in 1880.

== See also ==
- List of geographic features in Thurston County, Washington
