= Salmon Creek (Black River tributary) =

Creek in Thurston County, Washington state

- Interactive map of Creek location
- Etymology: Named after salmon in creek

Location
- Country: United States
- State: Washington
- County: Thurston County

Physical characteristics
- Mouth
  - coordinates: 46°55′58″N 123°00′14″W

Basin features
- River system: Black River
- Geographic Names Information System: 1511618

Salmon Creek is a stream in Thurston County in the U.S. state of Washington. It is a tributary to the Black River.

Salmon Creek was so named on account of its stock of salmon.

== See also ==
- List of geographic features in Thurston County, Washington
