= Northcraft Mountain =

Mountain in Washington, United States

Coordinates: 46°49′46″N 122°48′36″W

Highest point
- Elevation: 1,417 ft (432 m)

Northcraft Mountain is a summit in Thurston County, Washington, in the United States. The elevation is 1,417 feet (432 m).

Northcraft Mountain was named after Philip D. Northcraft, a pioneer settler.

== See also ==
- List of geographic features in Thurston County, Washington
