= Bass Lake (Thurston County, Washington) =

Lake in Thurston County, Washington state

- Location: Thurston County, Washington
- Coordinates: 46°49′48″N 122°24′44″W
- Type: Lake
- Surface elevation: 499 feet (152 m)
- References: Geographic Names Information System: 1516180

Bass Lake is a lake in the U.S. state of Washington.

Bass Lake was named for its stock of bass fish.

== See also ==
- List of geographic features in Thurston County, Washington
