= Blumaer Hill =

Hill in Washington state

Coordinates: 46°50′08″N 122°50′02″W

Highest point
- Elevation: 1,027 ft (313 m)

Blumaer Hill is a summit in Thurston County, Washington, in the United States. The elevation is 1,027 feet (313 m).

A variant name is Blumauer Hill. The hill has the name of Isaac and Solomon Blumauer, sibling businessmen in the local lumber industry.

== See also ==
- List of geographic features in Thurston County, Washington
