= Hicks Lake =

Lake in Thurston County, Washington state

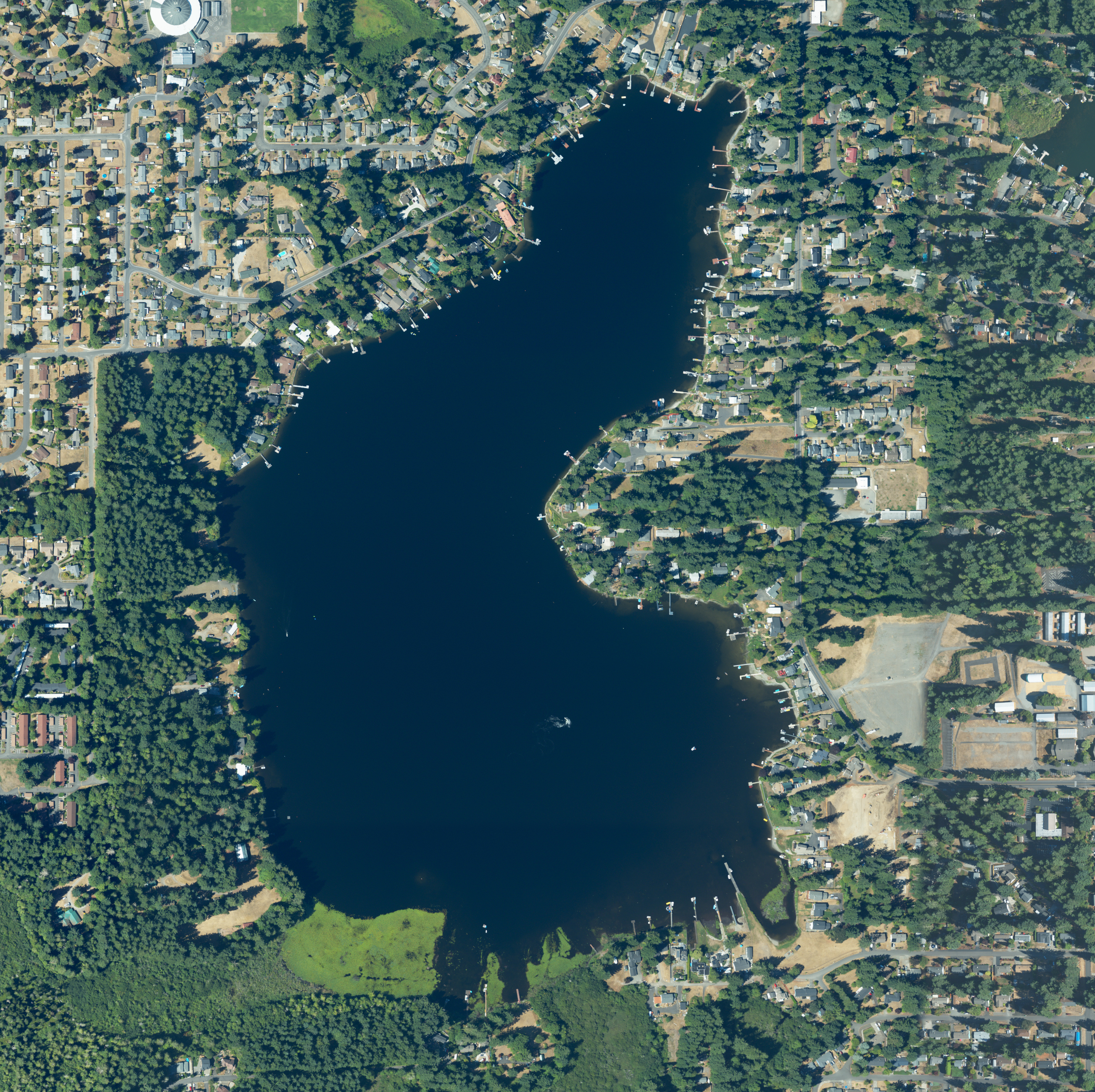
- Hicks Lake in August 2023
- Location: Thurston County, Washington
- Coordinates: 47°01′19″N 122°47′49″W
- Type: Lake
- Etymology: Urban East Hicks
- References: Geographic Names Information System: 1505488

Hicks Lake is a lake in the U.S. state of Washington.

Hicks Lake was named after Urban East Hicks, pioneer settler and territorial politician.

== See also ==
- List of geographic features in Thurston County, Washington
