= Ward Lake (Thurston County, Washington) =

Lake in Thurston County, Washington state

- Location: Washington, United States
- Coordinates: 47°00′32″N 122°52′32″W
- Type: Lake
- Etymology: Ira Ward
- Surface area: 66.8 acres (27.0 ha)
- Max. depth: 67 feet (20 m)
- References: Geographic Names Information System: 1509289

Ward Lake is a lake in the U.S. state of Washington. The lake has a surface area of 66.8 acres (27.0 ha) and reaches a depth of 67 feet (20 m).

Ward Lake was named after Ira Ward, a pioneer citizen.

== See also ==
- List of geographic features in Thurston County, Washington
