= Medicine Creek (McAllister Creek tributary) =

Creek in Thurston County, Washington state

- Interactive map of Creek location
- Etymology: Medicinal qualities of waters

Location
- Country: United States
- State: Washington
- County: Thurston County

Physical characteristics
- Mouth
  - coordinates: 47°03′16″N 122°43′37″W

Basin features
- River system: McAllister Creek
- Geographic Names Information System: 1506612

Medicine Creek is a stream in Thurston County in the U.S. state of Washington. It is a tributary to McAllister Creek.

Medicine Creek received its name from Native Americans of the area, who believed its waters held medicinal qualities.

== See also ==
- List of geographic features in Thurston County, Washington
