= Burns Cove =

Bay in Puget Sound, Washington state

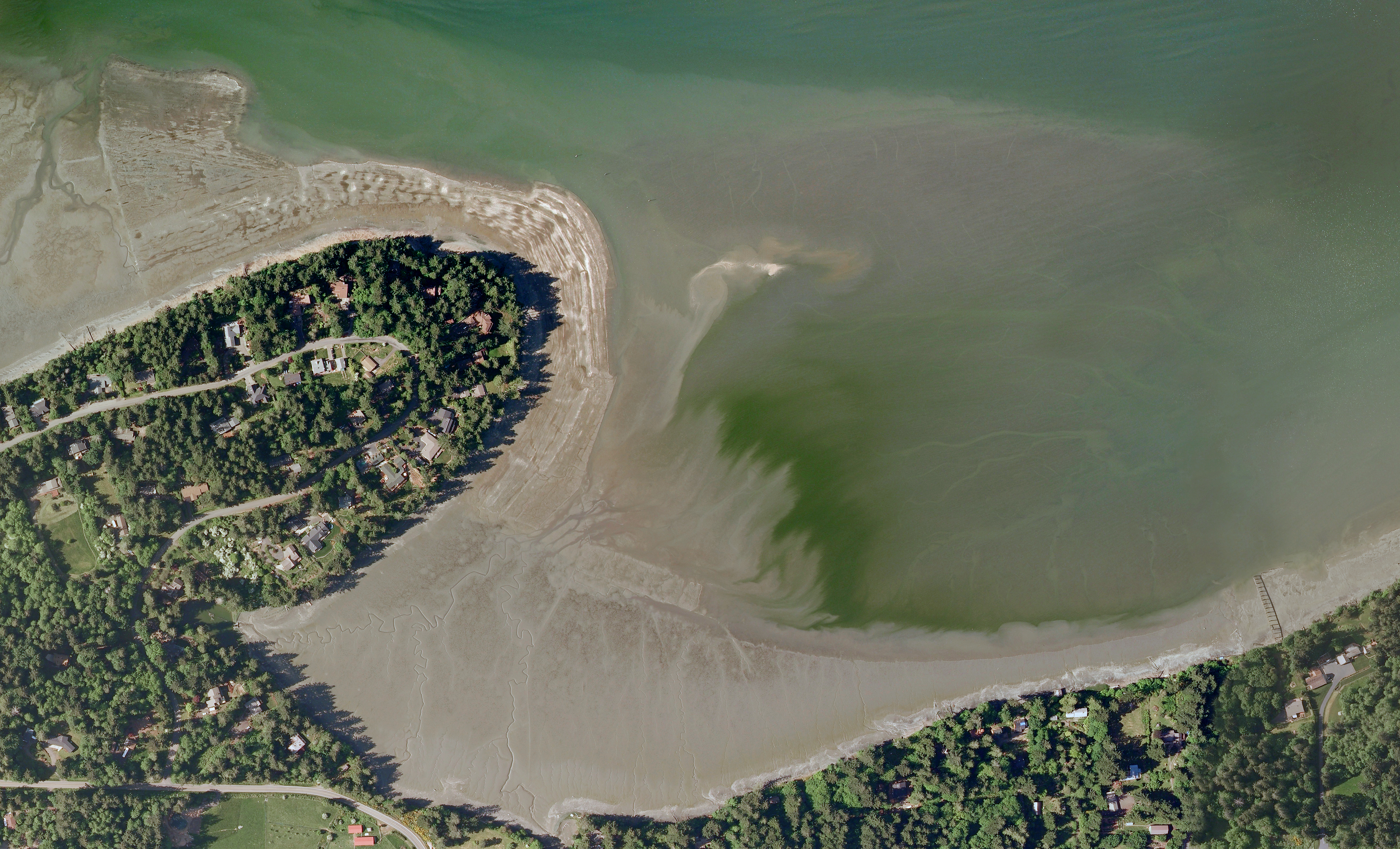
- Burns Cove in May 2009
- Coordinates: 47°06′28″N 123°02′28″W
- Type: Bay

Burns Cove is a bay in the U.S. state of Washington.

Burns Cove has the name of Henry Burns, an early settler.

== See also ==
- List of geographic features in Thurston County, Washington
