= Butler Cove =

Bay in Puget Sound, Washington state

Coordinates: 47°04′53″N 122°56′09″W

Butler Cove is a bay in the U.S. state of Washington.

Butler Cove was named after John L. Butler, a pioneer settler.

== See also ==
- List of geographic features in Thurston County, Washington
