= Trosper Lake =

Lake in Thurston County, Washington state

- Location: Thurston County, Washington
- Coordinates: 46°59′45″N 122°55′54″W
- Type: Lake
- Etymology: John Trosper
- Surface area: 17 acres (6.9 ha)
- Max. depth: 12 feet (3.7 m)
- References: Geographic Names Information System: 1509084

Trosper Lake is a lake in the U.S. state of Washington. The lake has a surface area of 17 acres (6.9 ha) and reaches a depth of 12 feet (3.7 m).

Trosper Lake was named after John Trosper, a pioneer citizen.

== See also ==
- List of geographic features in Thurston County, Washington
