= Reichel Lake =

Lake in Thurston County, Washington state

- Location: Thurston County, Washington
- Coordinates: 46°49′33″N 122°35′28″W
- Type: Lake
- Etymology: Louis Reighel
- Surface area: 9 acres (3.6 ha)
- References: Geographic Names Information System: 1524986

Reichel Lake is a lake in the U.S. state of Washington. The lake has a surface area of 9 acres (3.6 ha).

Reichel Lake was named after Louis Reighel, a pioneer who arrived into the area in the 1880s.

== See also ==
- List of geographic features in Thurston County, Washington
