= Hogum Bay =

Bay in Puget Sound, Washington state

Coordinates: 47°06′38″N 122°44′16″W

Hogum Bay is a bay in the U.S. state of Washington.

According to tradition, the name Hogum refers land investors who quickly bought up (i.e. "hogged") land around the bay.

== See also ==
- List of geographic features in Thurston County, Washington
