= Gull Harbor (Washington) =

Bay in Puget Sound, Washington state

Coordinates: 47°06′47″N 122°53′21″W

Gull Harbor is a bay in the U.S. state of Washington.

Gull Harbor was named for seagulls which congregate at the bay.

== See also ==
- List of geographic features in Thurston County, Washington
