= Southwick Lake =

Lake in Thurston County, Washington state

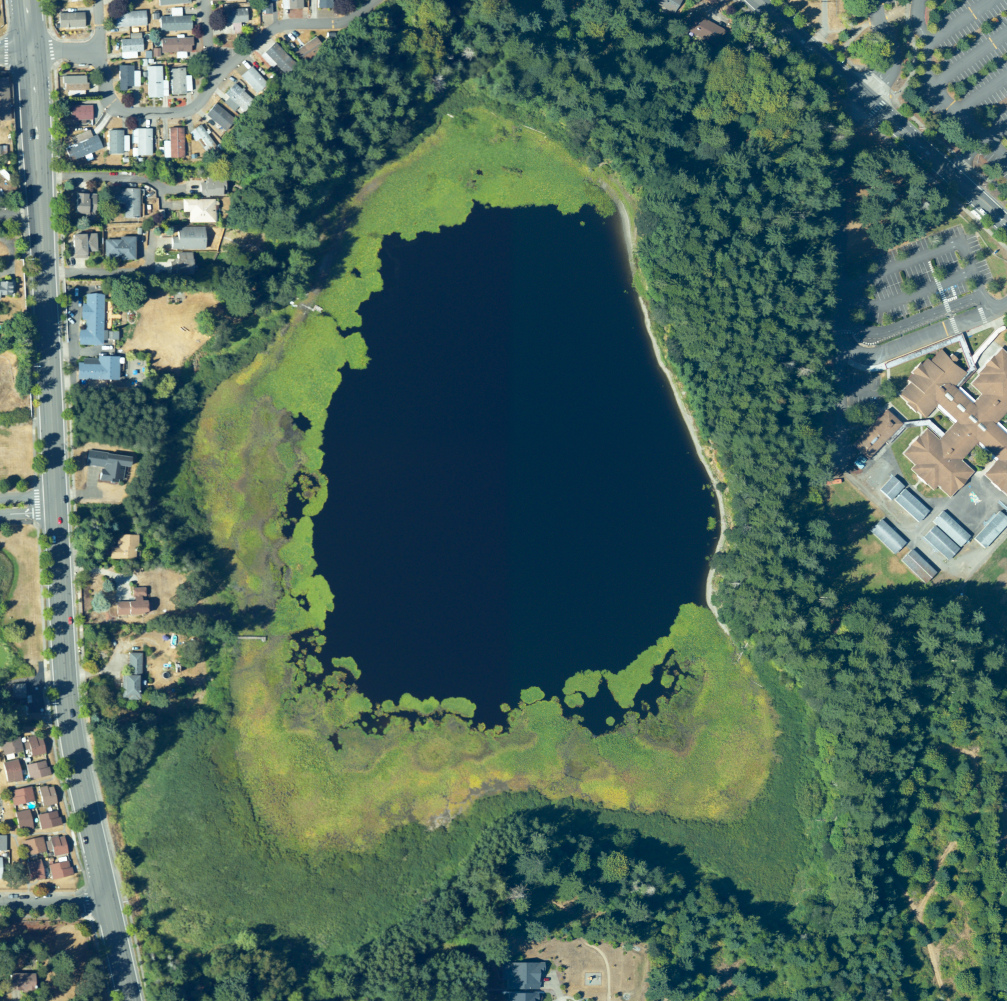
- Southwick Lake, 2023
- Location: Thurston County, Washington
- Coordinates: 47°00′17″N 122°48′17″W
- Type: Lake
- Etymology: James Southwick
- Surface area: 37 acres (15 ha)
- Max. depth: 10 feet (3.0 m)
- References: Geographic Names Information System: 1508573

Southwick Lake is a lake in the U.S. state of Washington. The lake has a surface area of 37 acres (15 ha) and reaches a depth of 10 feet (3.0 m).

Southwick Lake was named after James Southwick, the proprietor of a lakeside resort.

== See also ==
- List of geographic features in Thurston County, Washington
