= List of geographic features in Thurston County, Washington =

The list of geographic features in Thurston County, Washington includes bodies of water and natural landforms. The list may also include geographic areas built or modified by humans, including archaeological sites and parks.

== Bodies of water ==
=== Bays and coves ===
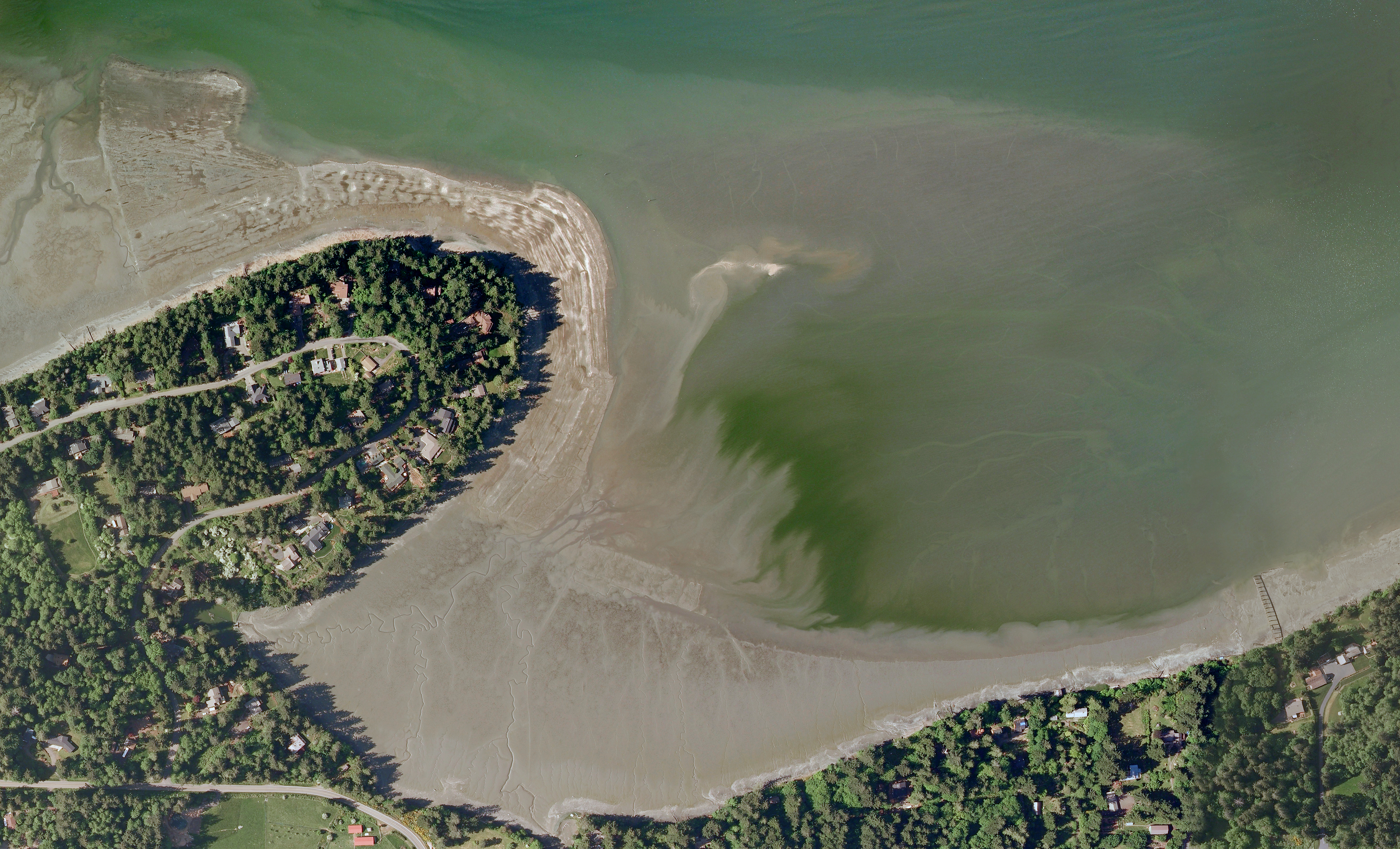
Burns Cove, 2009

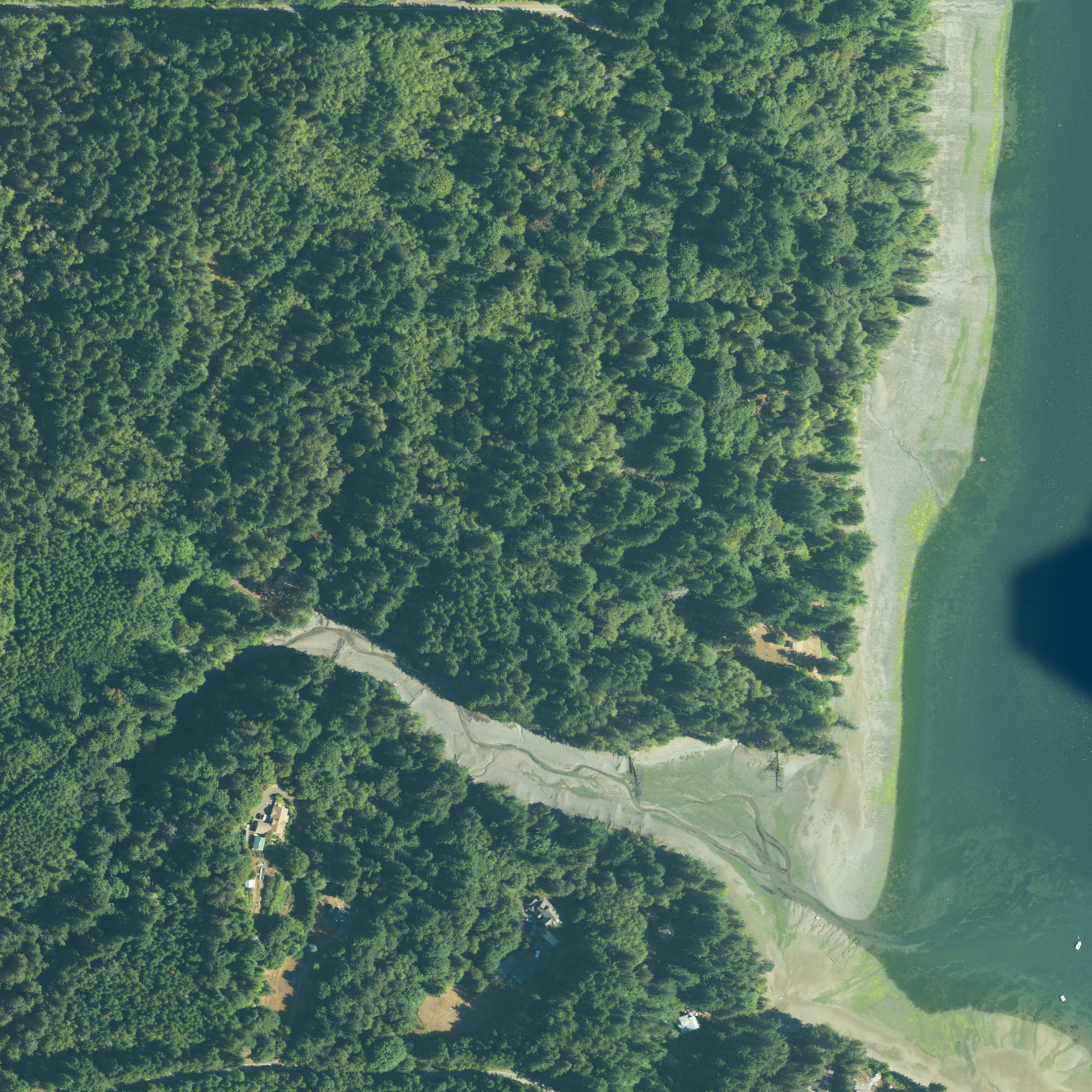
Frye Cove, 2023

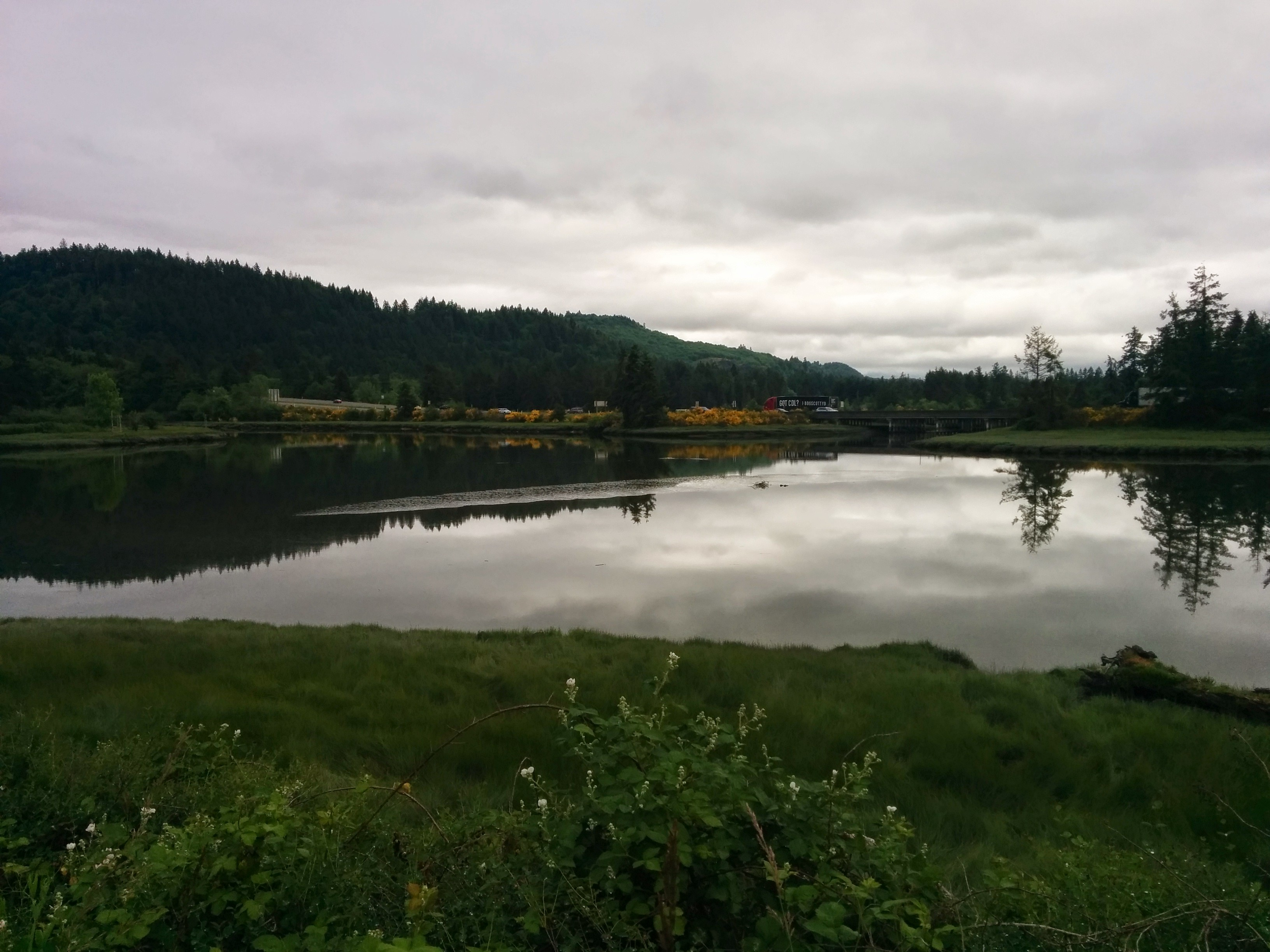
Mud Bay, 2015
- Baird Cove
- Burns Cove
- Butler Cove
- Chapman Bay
- Dogfish Bight
- Ellis Cove
- Frye Cove
- Gallagher Cove
- Green Cove
- Gull Harbor
- Hogum Bay
- Mud Bay
- Nisqually Reach
- Oyster Bay
- Poncin Cove
- Young Cove
- Zangle Cove

=== Channels ===
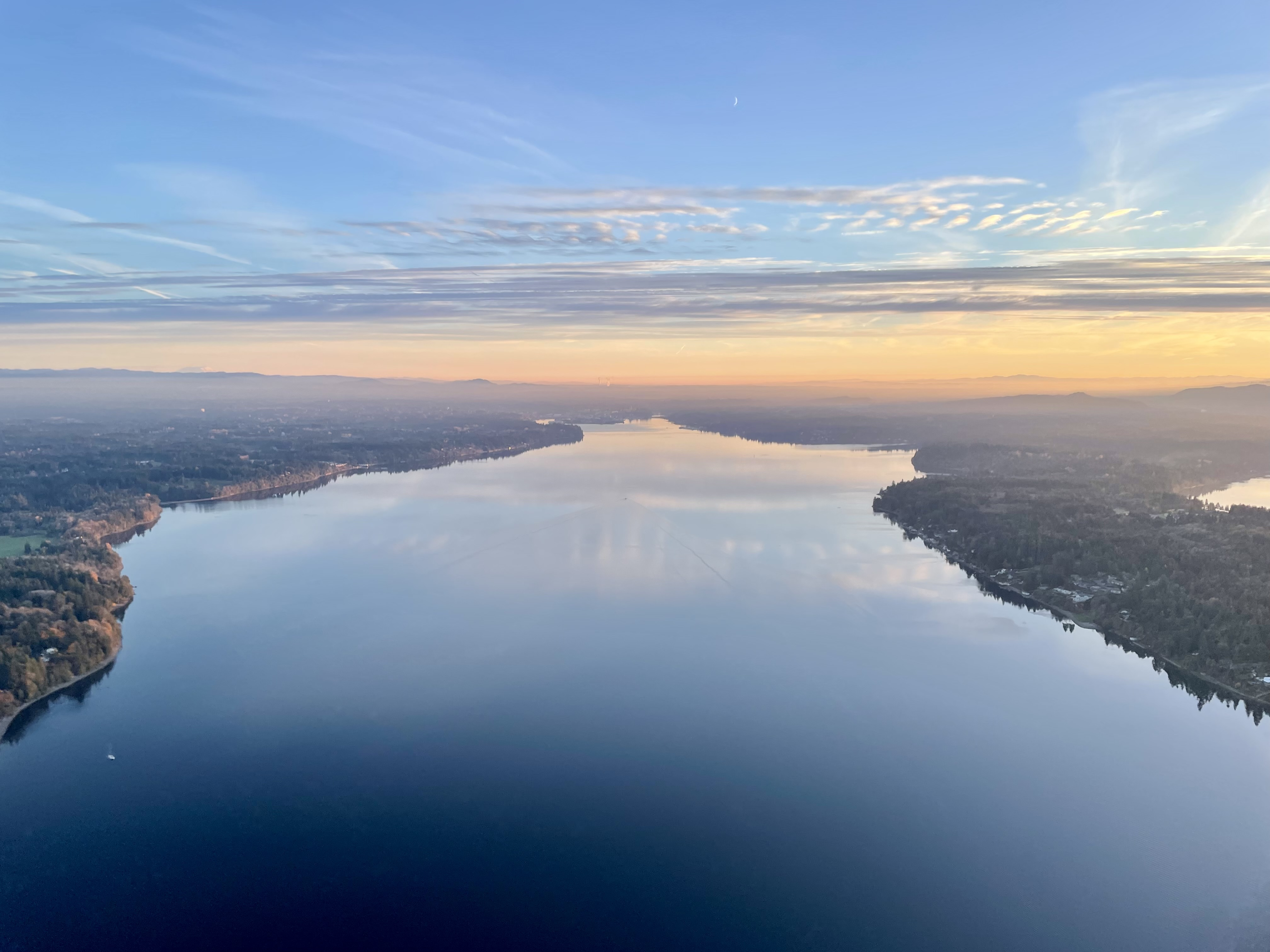
Budd Inlet, 2023

- Dana Passage

=== Inlets ===
- Budd Inlet
- Eld Inlet
- Henderson Inlet
- Totten Inlet

=== Lakes and ponds ===
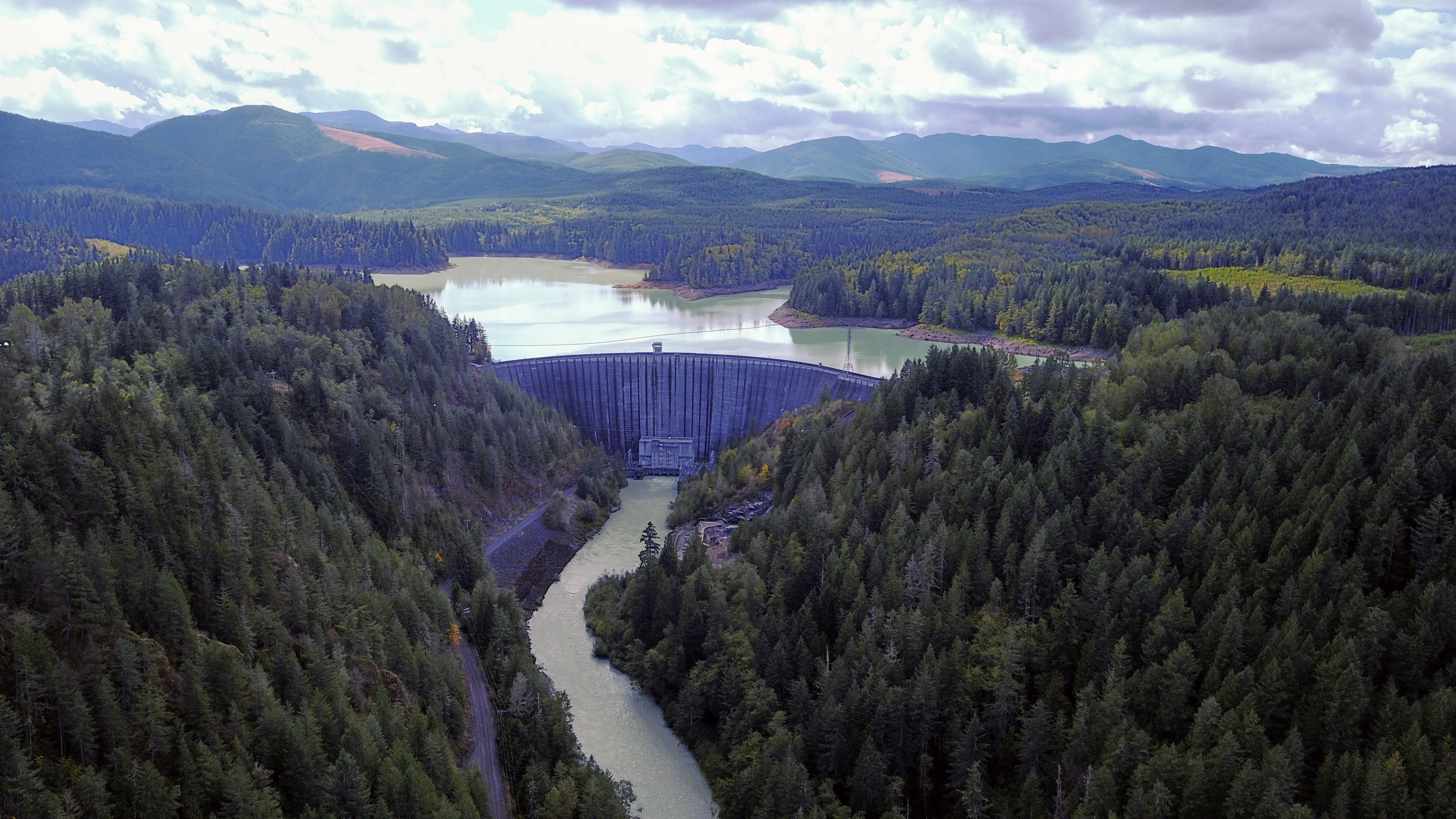
Alder Lake, 2017

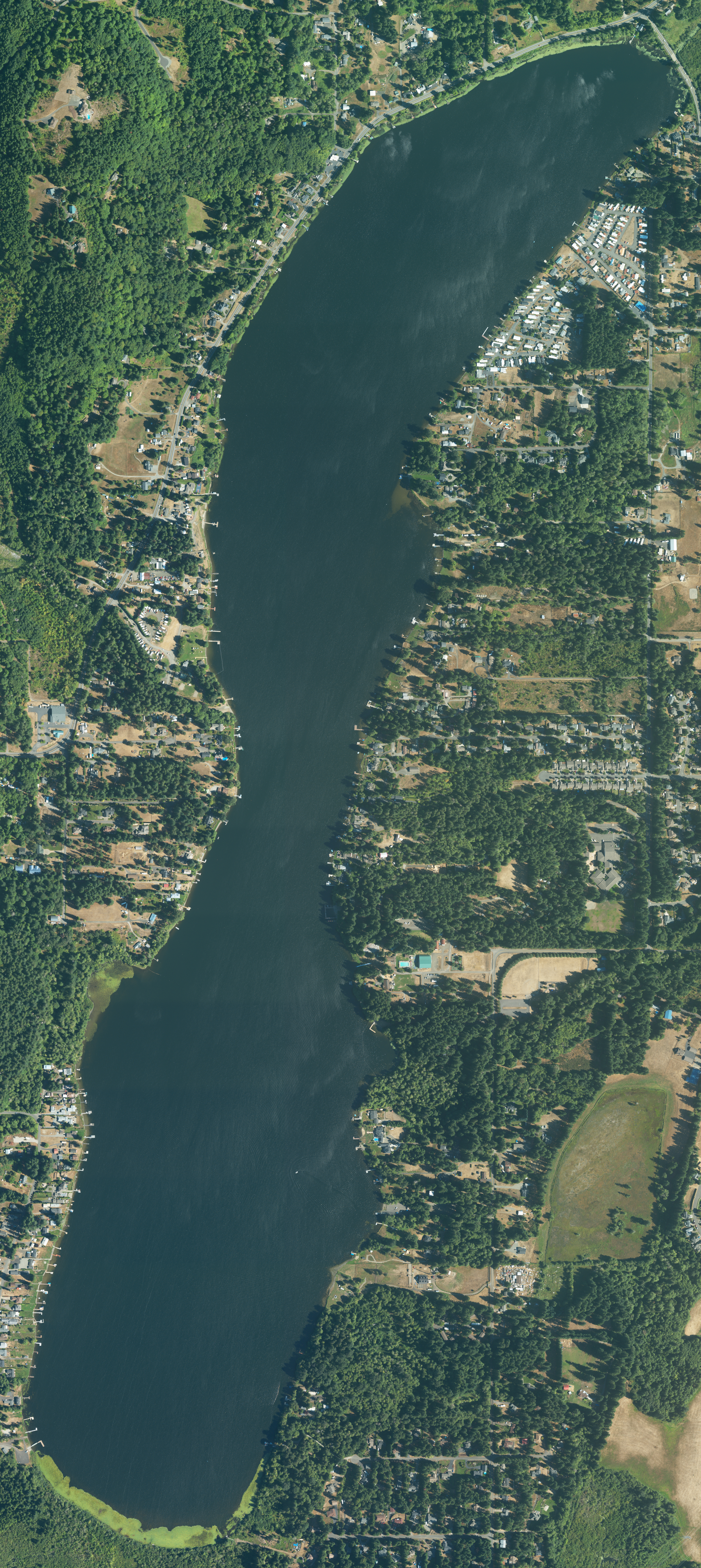
Black Lake, 2023

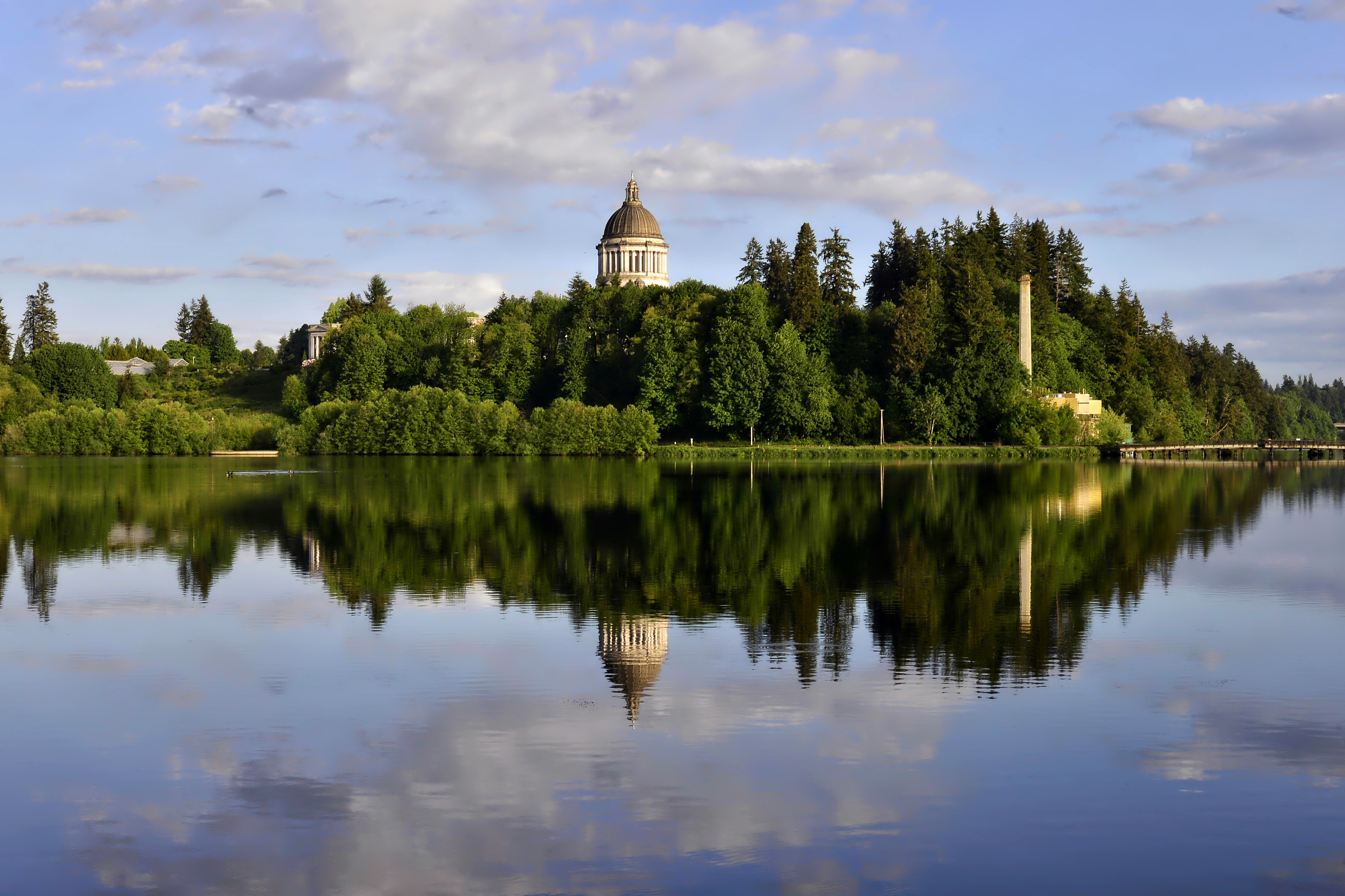
Capitol Lake, 2016

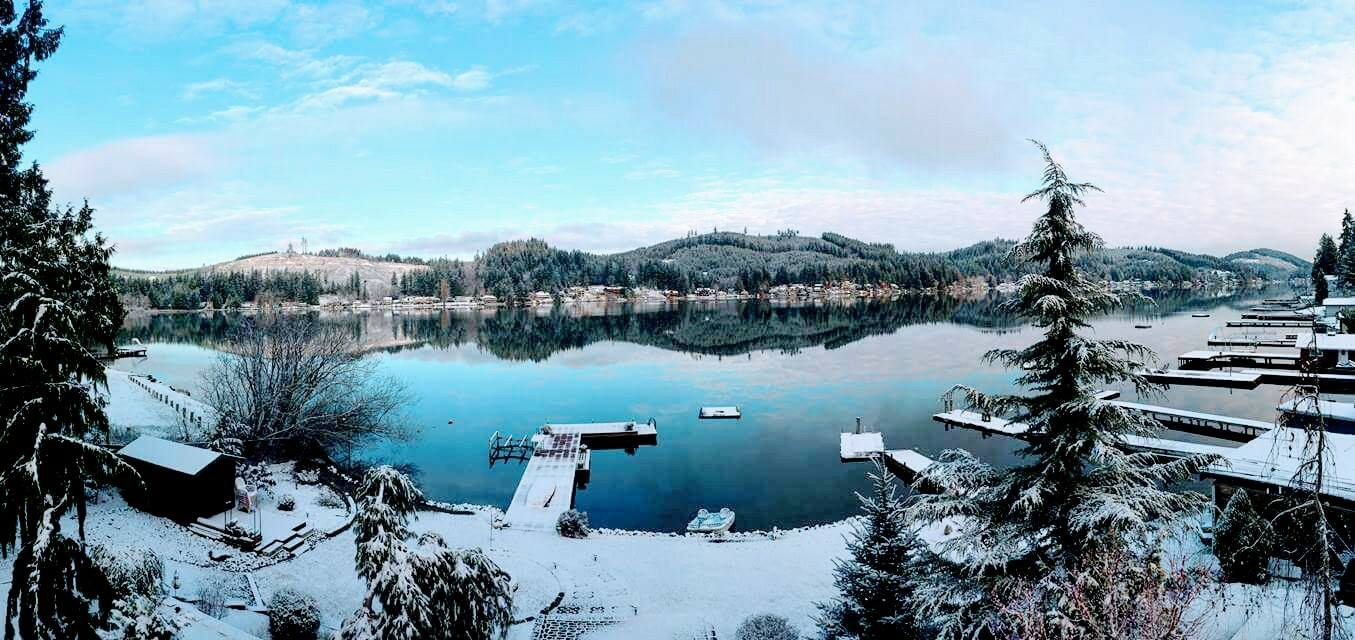
Summit Lake, 2020
- Alder Lake
- Barnes Lake
- Bass Lake
- Black Lake
- Capitol Lake
- Chambers Lake
- Clear Lake
- Deep Lake
- Elbow Lake
- Fiander Lake
- Gehrke Lake
- Goodwin Lake
- Goose Pond
- Grass Lakes, including Louise Lake
- Hazard Lake
- Hewitt Lake
- Hicks Lake
- Lake Fifteen
- Lake Lawrence
- Lake Lois
- Lake Lucinda
- Lake Saint Clair
- Long Lake
- Longs Pond
- McIntosh Lake
- McKenzie Lake
- Mud Lake
- Munn Lake
- Offutt Lake
- Pattison Lake
- Pitman Lake
- Reichel Lake
- Scott Lake
- Setchfield Lake
- Simmons Lake, also as Ken Lake
- Smith Lake
- Southwick Lake
- Summit Lake
- Sunwood Lake
- Trosper Lake
- Ward Lake

=== Rivers, creeks, or streams ===
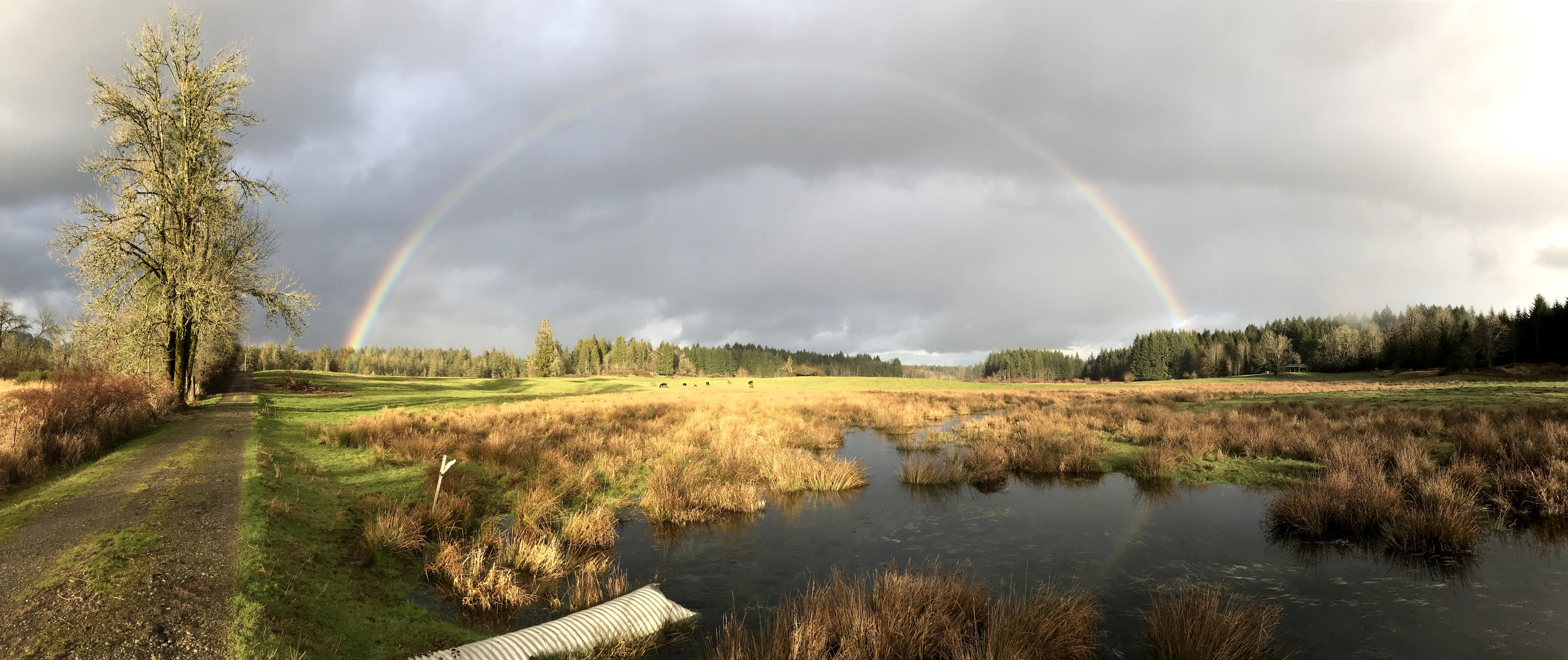
Black River, 2023

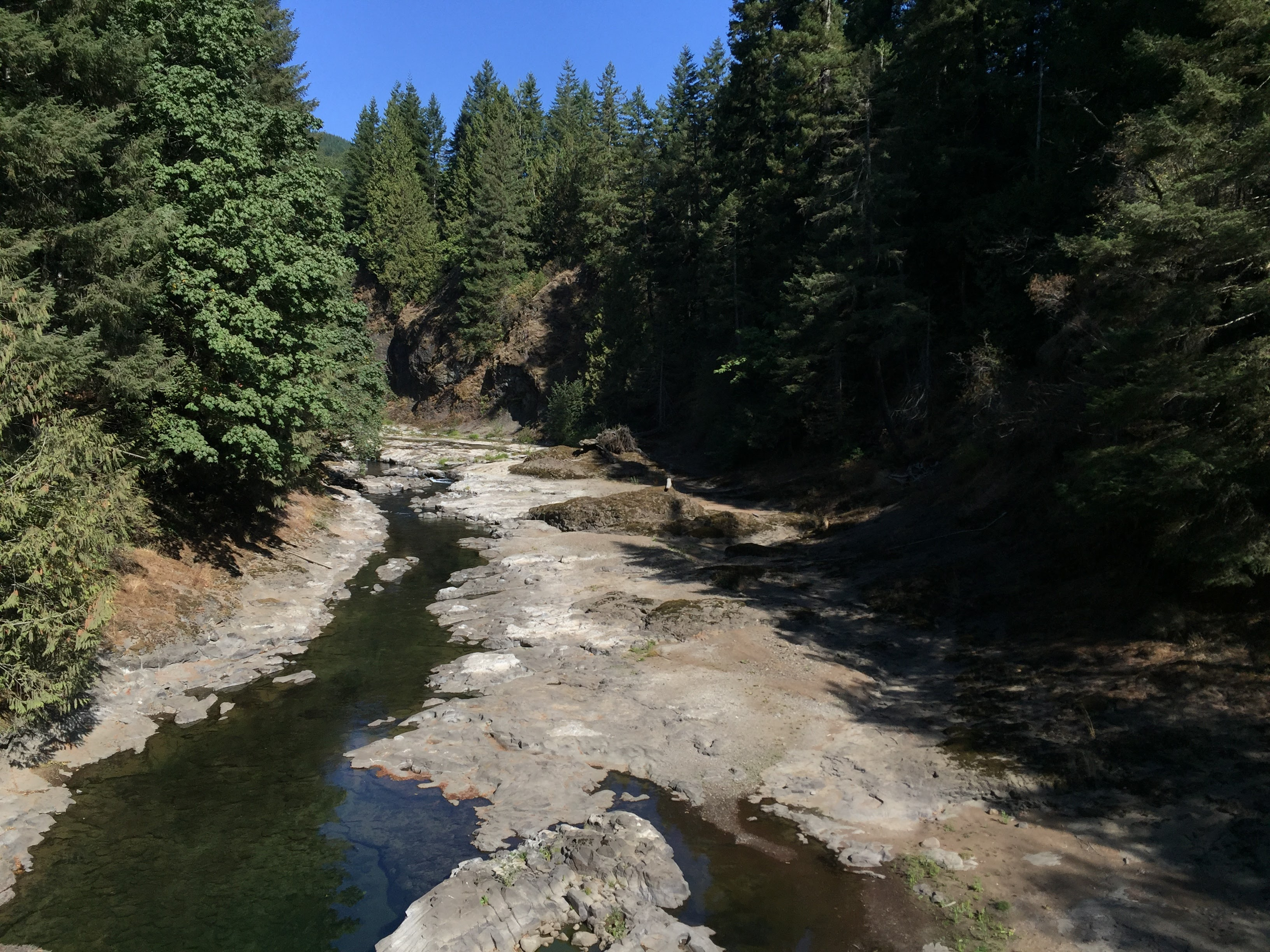
Chehalis River, 2017

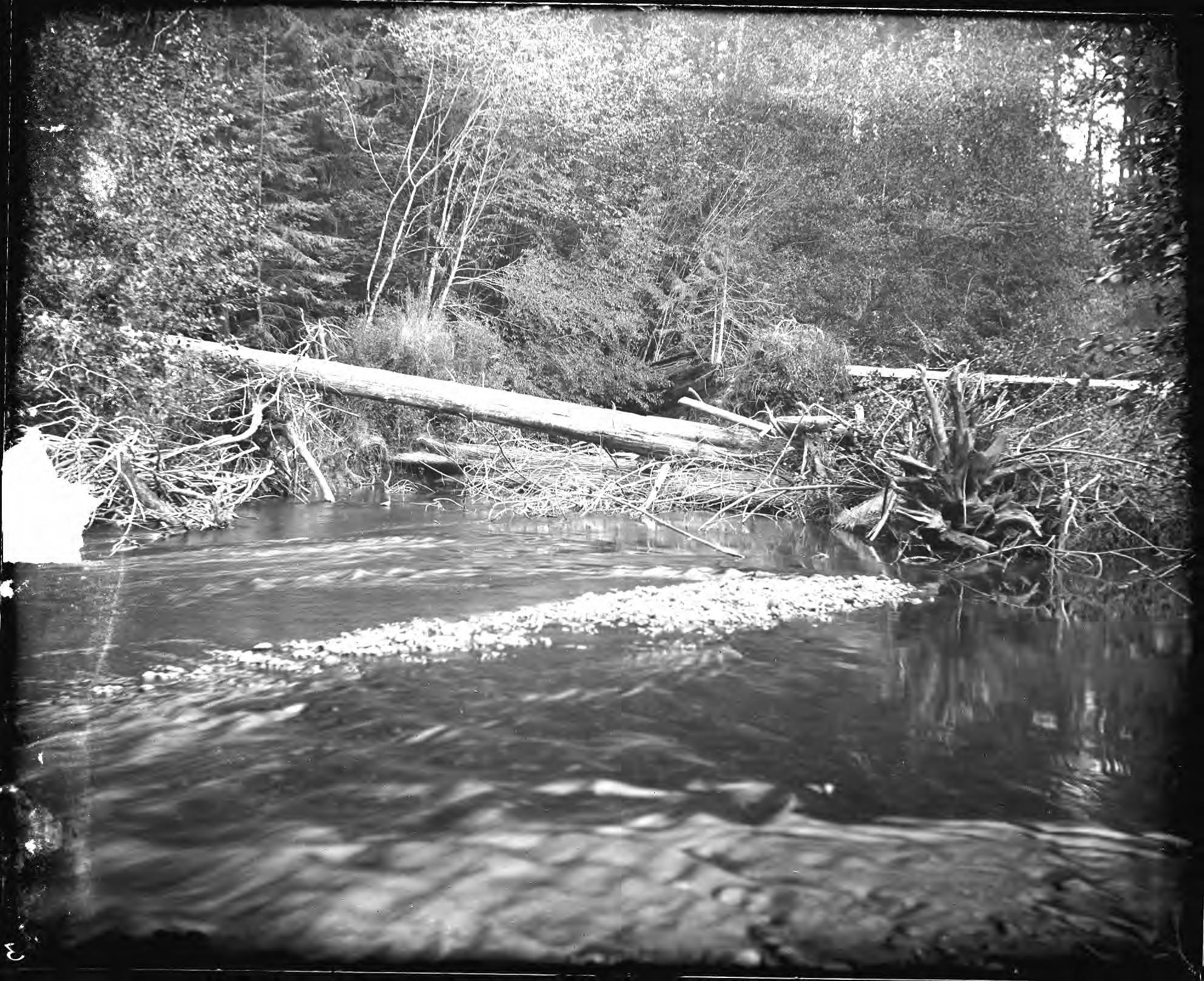
Deschutes River, 1895

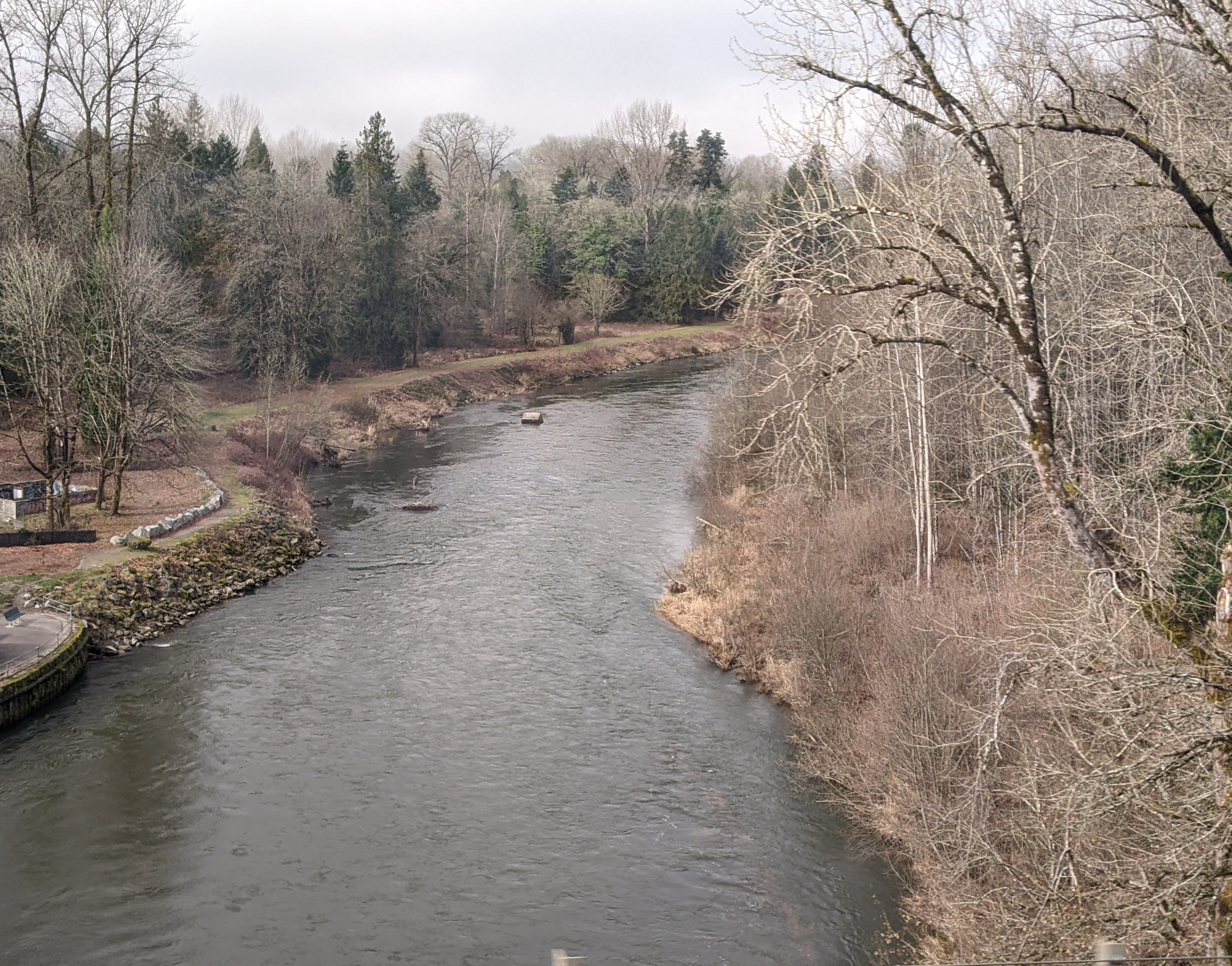
Nisqually River, 2025

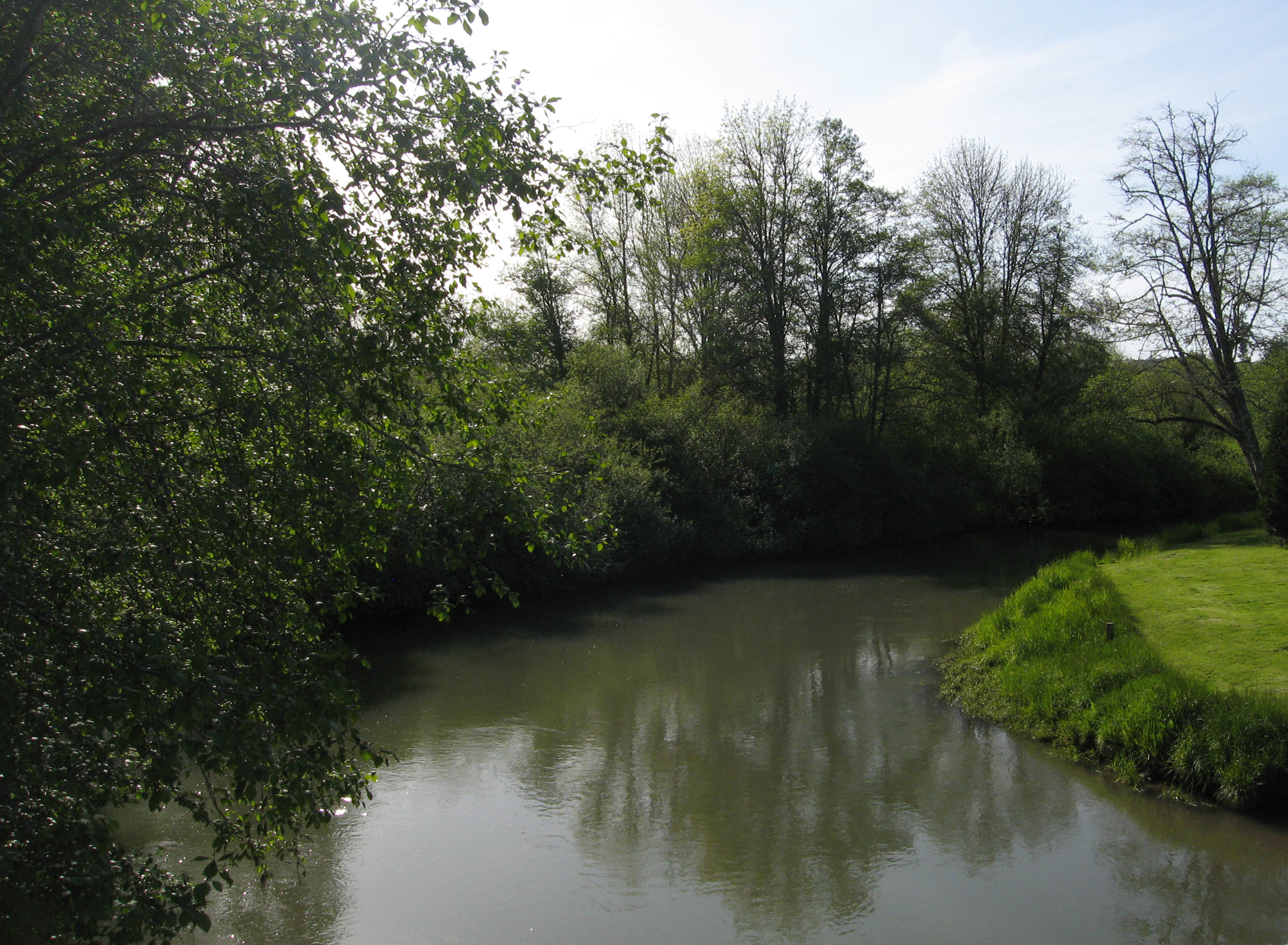
Skookumchuck River, 2009
- Beatty Creek
- Black River
- Chehalis River
- Deschutes River
- Eaton Creek
- Elbow Lake Creek
- Ellis Creek
- Indian Creek
- Johnson Creek
- Kennedy Creek
- Lackamas Creek
- Libby Creek
- McAllister Creek
- McLane Creek
- Medicine Creek
- Mill Creek
- Mima Creek
- Moxlie Creek
- Nisqually River
- Noski Creek
- Percival Creek
- Prairie Creek
- Salmon Creek
- Schneider Creek
- Simmons Creek
- Skookumchuck River
- Spurgeon Creek
- Thompson Creek (Nisqually River tributary)
- Thompson Creek (Skookumchuck River tributary)
- Thurston Creek
- Troller Run
- Waddell Creek
- Woodland Creek
- Yelm Creek

=== Other ===
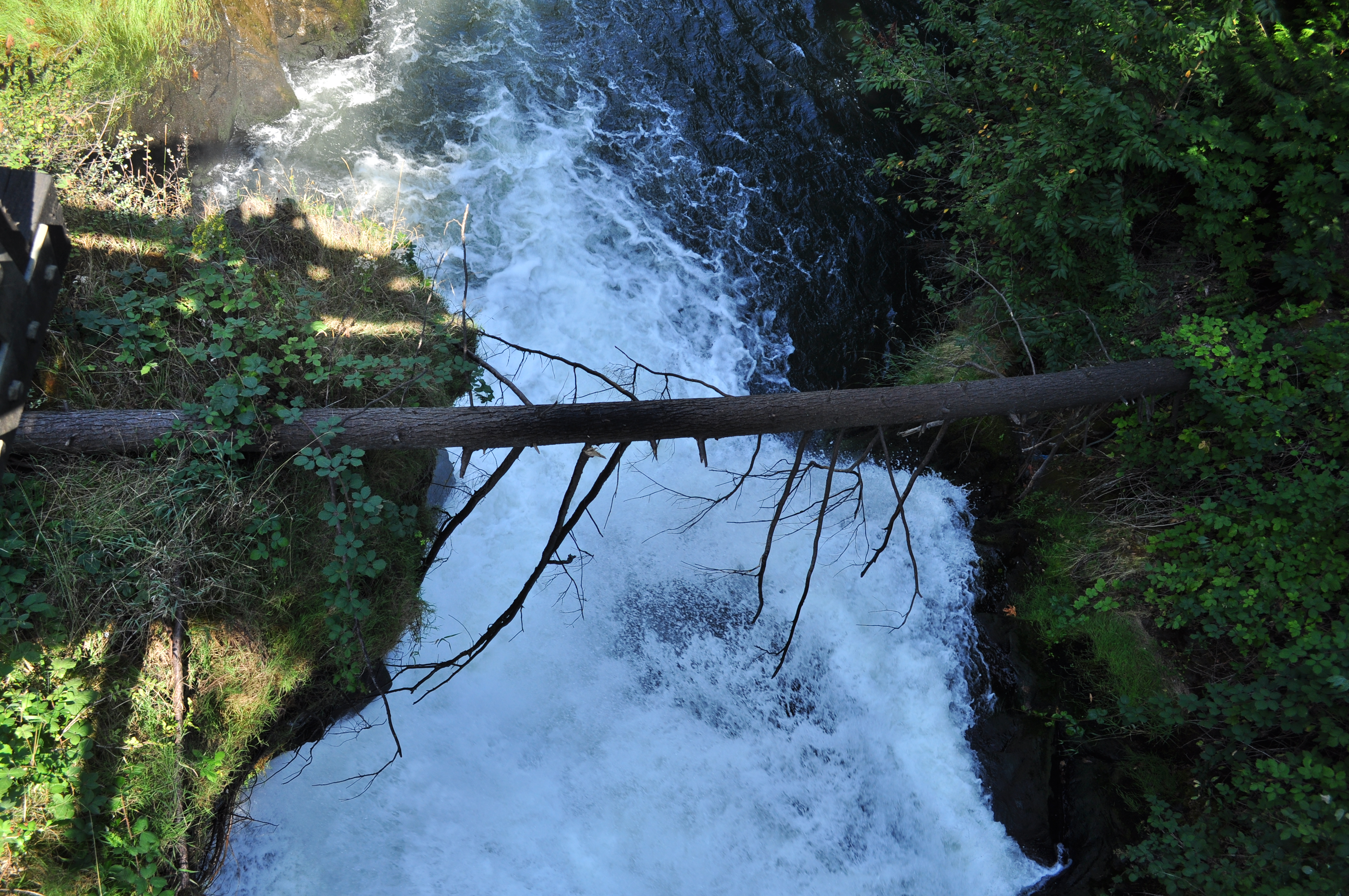
Lower Tumwater Falls, 2014

- Parsnip Swamp
- Thirty-eight Infantry Bluff

=== Waterfalls ===
- Mima Falls
- Tumwater Falls

== Landforms ==
=== Islands ===
- Holmes Island
- Steamboat Island

=== Hills, mountains, and ranges ===
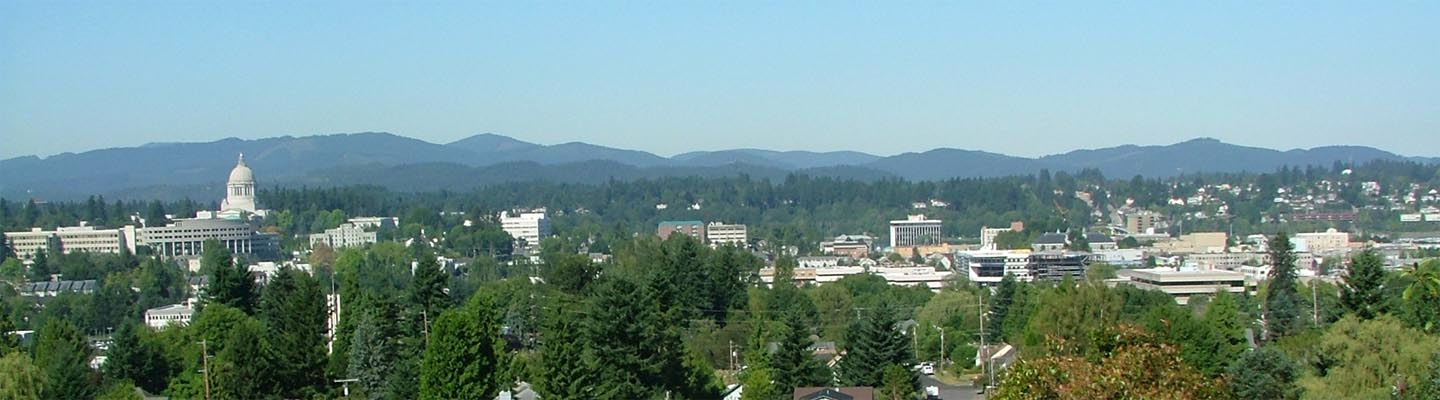
Black Hills panoramic, 2005

- Black Hills
- Blumaer Hill
- Capitol Peak
- Larch Mountain
- Northcraft Mountain

=== Parks and preserves ===
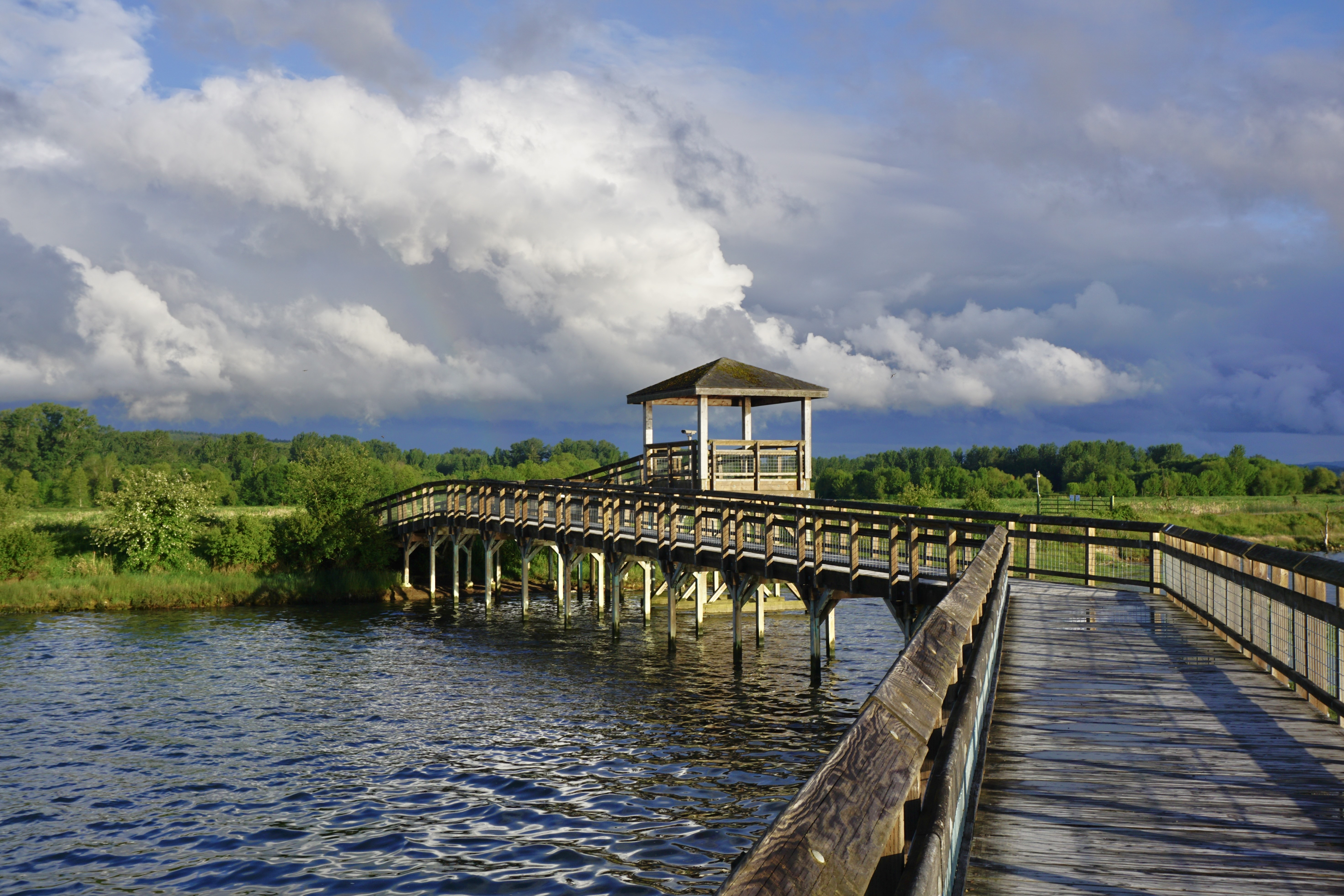
Billy Frank Jr. Nisqually National Wildlife Refuge, 2025

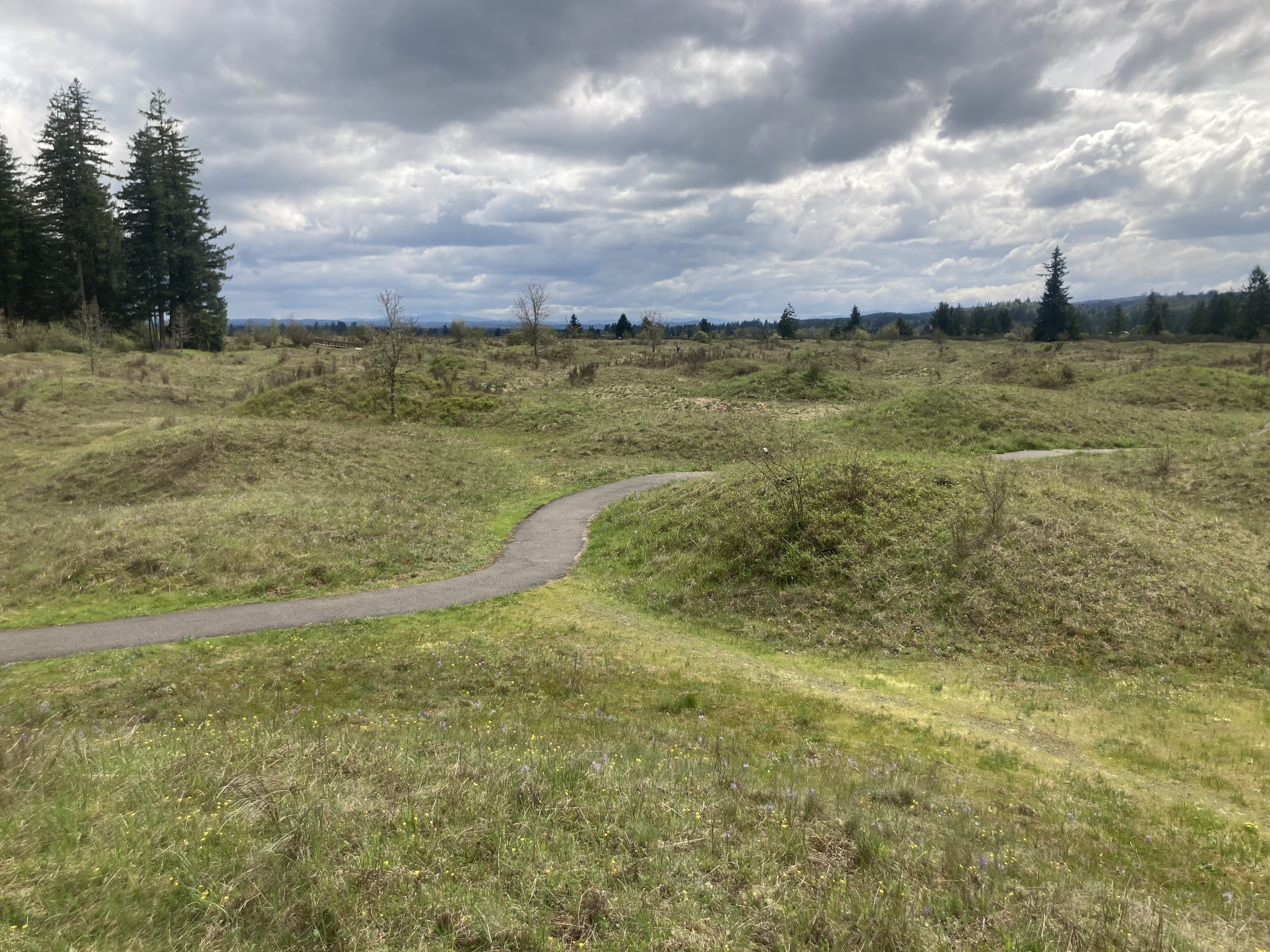
Mima Mounds Natural Area Preserve, 2023

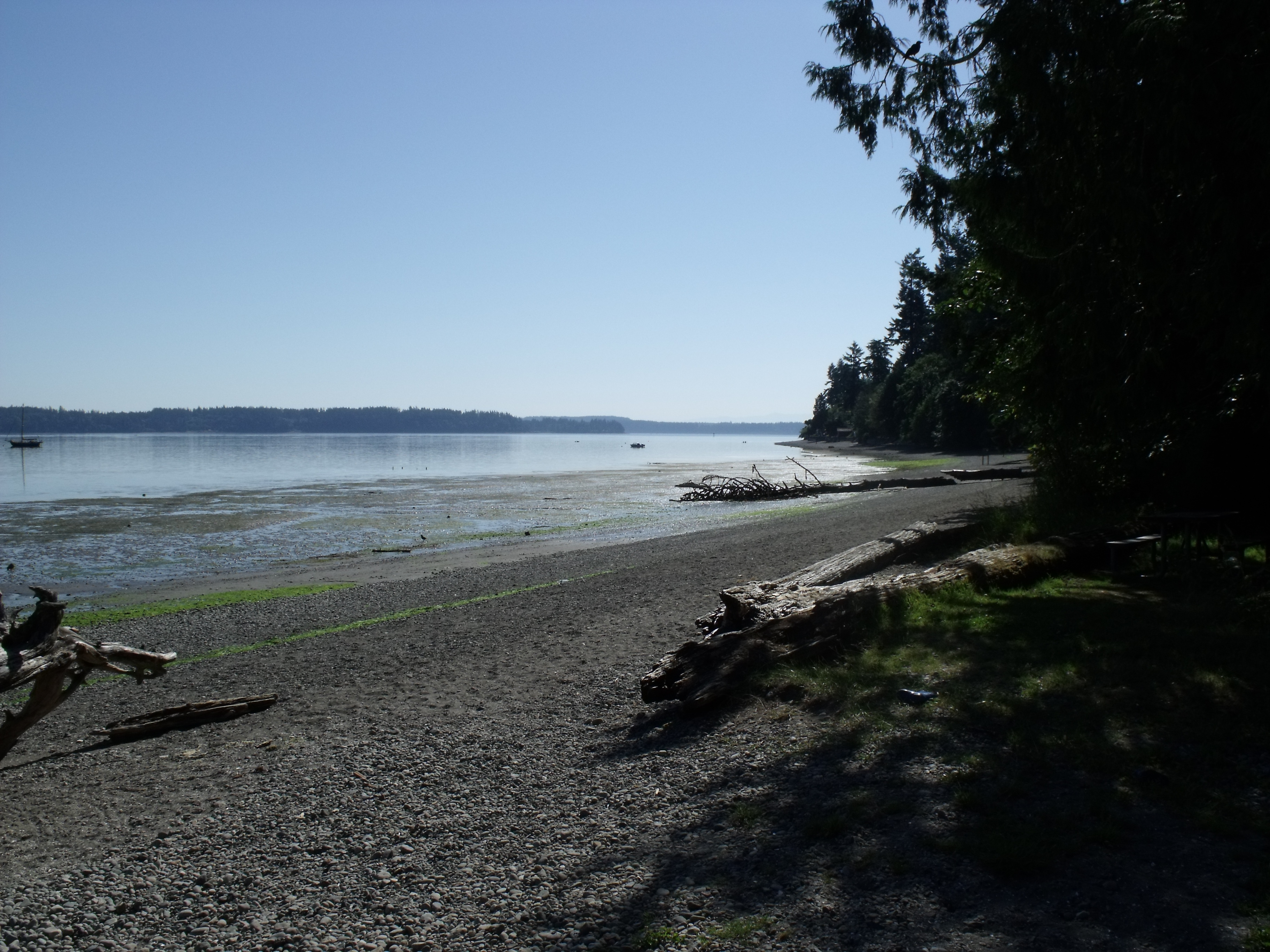
Tolmie State Park, 2011

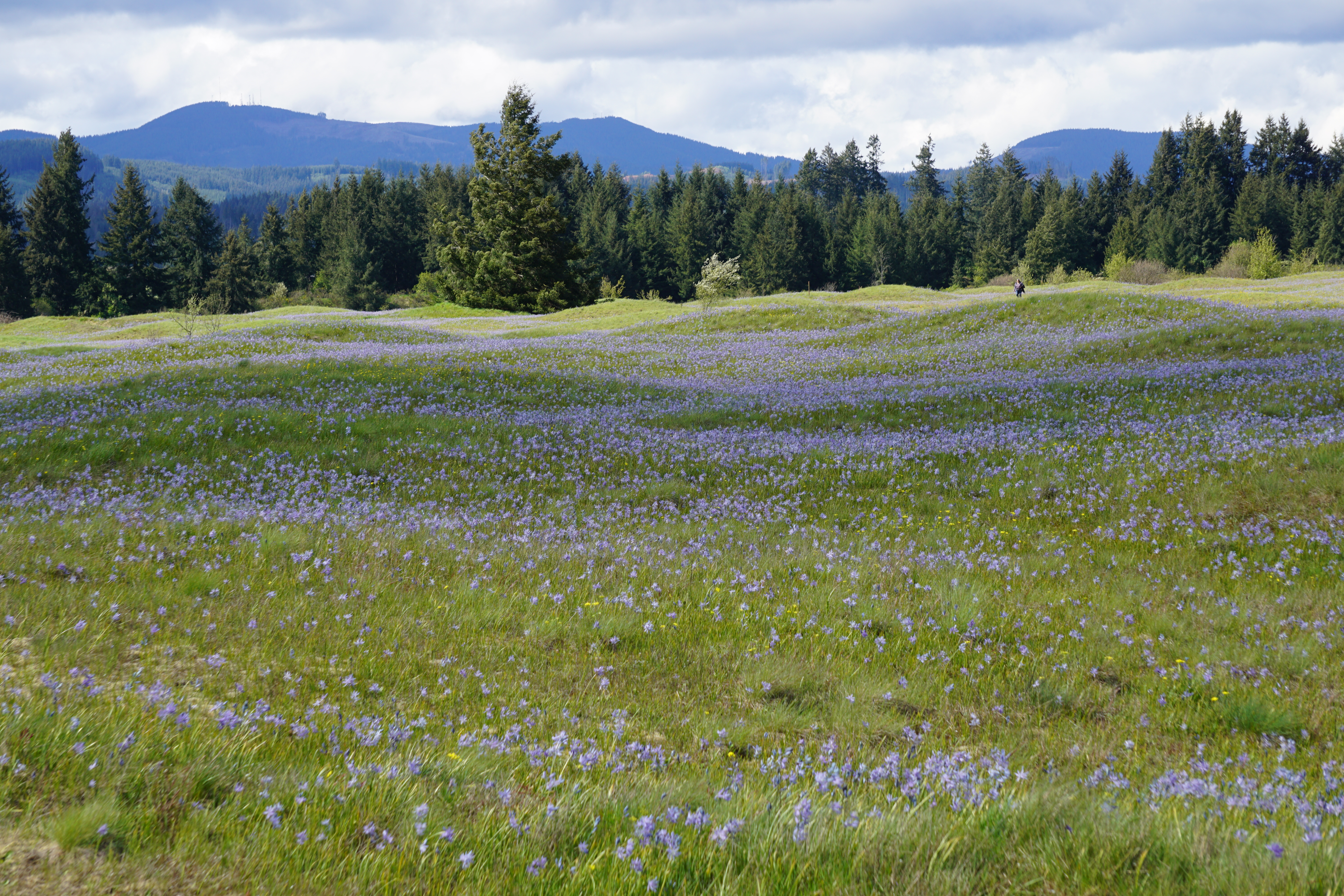
Scatter Creek - Glacial Heritage Preserve, 2022

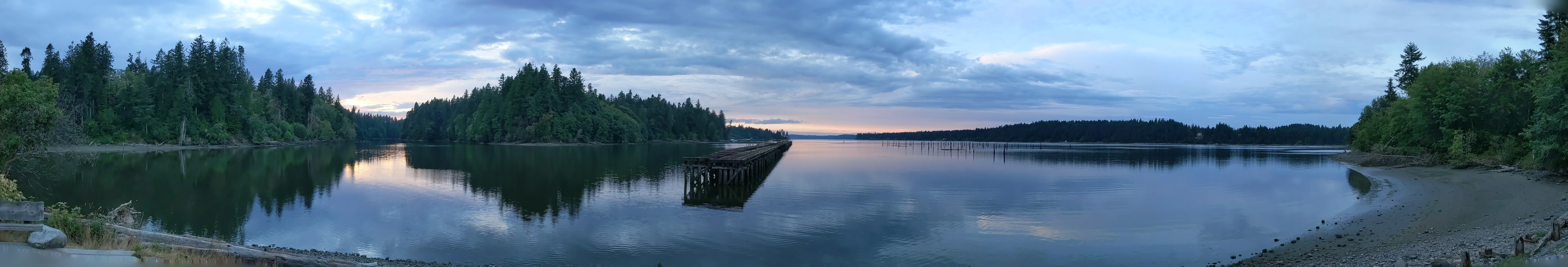
Woodard Bay Natural Resources Conservation Area, 2019

The following list contains parks, nature preserves or refuges, and trails under state or federal management. For local parks, protected areas, and other recreational sites, please refer to community articles within Thurston County.

- Billy Frank Jr. Nisqually National Wildlife Refuge
- Black River National Wildlife Refuge
- Capitol State Forest
- Chehalis Western Trail
- Darlin Creek Preserve
- Kennedy Creek Natural Area Preserve
- Millersylvania State Park
- Mima Mounds Natural Area Preserve
- Randall Preserve and Allison Springs
- Scatter Creek Wildlife Area (Note: The Scatter Creek Wildlife Area includes the neighboring parcels, the Black River Wildlife Area Unit and Glacial Heritage Preserve. Also included is the Davis Creek Wildlife Area Unit and Skookumchuck Wildlife Area Unit, as well as the nature preserves, the Violet Prairie Wildlife Area Unit, and West Rocky Prairie Unit.)
- Tolmie State Park
- Wolf Haven International
- Woodard Bay Natural Resources Conservation Area
- Yelm–Rainier–Tenino Trail

=== Other ===
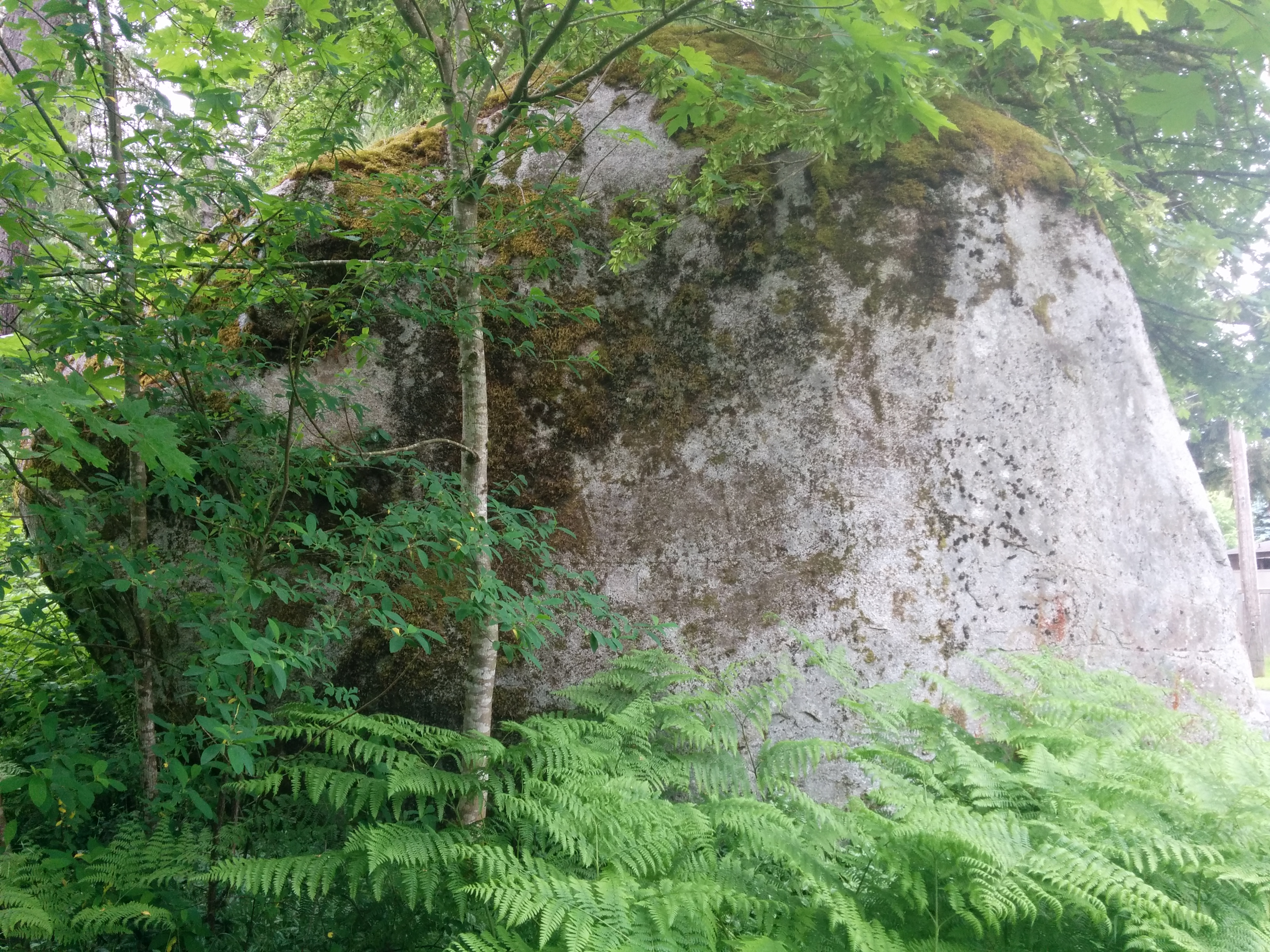
Lawrence Lake erratic, 2015

- Chehalis Gap
- Lake Lawrence erratic
- Rocky Prairie
- Thirty-eight Infantry Bluff

=== Peninsulas and points ===
- Cooper Point
- Dickenson Point
- Hunter Point
- Jeal Point
- Johnson Point (Thurston County, Washington)
- Shell Point
- Warren Point

=== Valleys ===
- Hanaford Valley
- Zenkner Valley

== See also ==
- Capitol Land Trust
- List of lakes of Washington
- List of mountain peaks of Washington
- List of rivers of Washington (state)
