= Troller Run =

Creek in Thurston County, Washington state

- Etymology: Troller family, settlers

Physical characteristics
- Mouth
  - coordinates: 46°47′24″N 122°43′42″W

Basin features
- River system: Skookumchuck River
- Geographic Names Information System: 1527389

Troller Run is a stream in Thurston County in the U.S. state of Washington. It is a tributary to the Skookumchuck River.

Troller Run has the name of the local Troller family which settled near its course.

== See also ==
- List of geographic features in Thurston County, Washington
