= Goose Pond (Washington) =

Pond in Thurston County, Washington

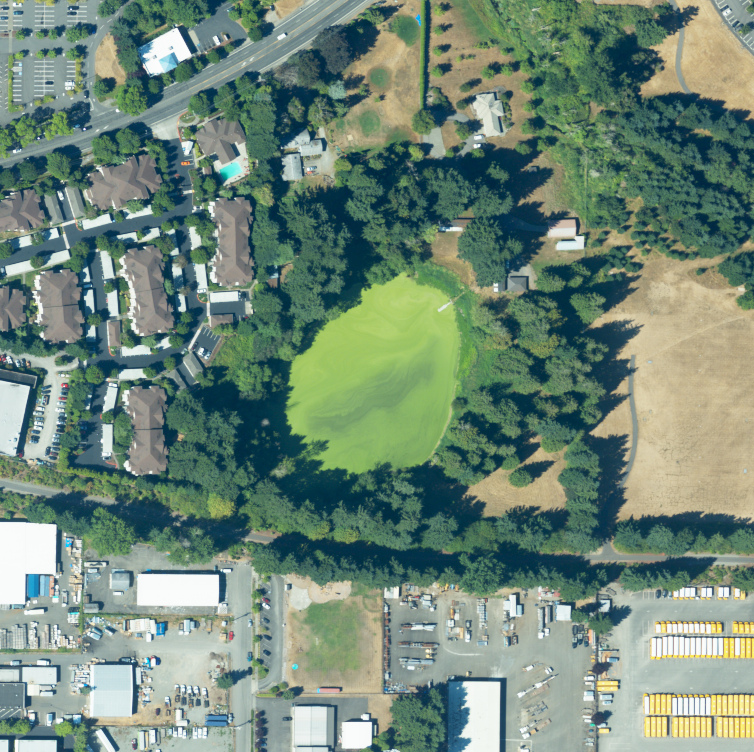
- Goose Pond in August 2023
- Location: Thurston County, Washington
- Coordinates: 47°02′12″N 122°47′50″W
- Type: Pond
- Etymology: Geese population
- References: Geographic Names Information System: 1505197

Goose Pond is a pond in the U.S. state of Washington.

Goose Pond was named for the geese which congregate there.

== See also ==
- List of geographic features in Thurston County, Washington
