= Clear Lake (Thurston County, Washington) =

Lake in Thurston County, Washington state

- Location: Thurston County, Washington
- Coordinates: 46°49′25″N 122°28′26″W
- Type: Lake
- Etymology: Clear waters
- Surface area: 173 acres (70 ha)
- Surface elevation: 522 feet (159 m)
- References: Geographic Names Information System: 1517833

Clear Lake is a lake in the U.S. state of Washington. The lake has a surface area of 173 acres (70 ha).

Clear Lake was so named on account of the clear character of its water.

== See also ==
- List of geographic features in Thurston County, Washington
