= Lake Fifteen =

Lake in Thurston County, Washington state

- Location: Thurston County, Washington
- Coordinates: 46°52′22″N 122°40′06″W
- Type: Lake
- Etymology: Section name of Thurston County
- Surface area: 4 acres (1.6 ha)
- Max. depth: 12 feet (3.7 m)
- References: Geographic Names Information System: 1519516

Lake Fifteen is a lake in the U.S. state of Washington. Lake Fifteen has a surface area of 4 acres (1.6 ha) and reaches a depth of 12 feet (3.7 m).

Lake Fifteen is located in Thurston County's "Section 15", hence the name.

== See also ==
- List of geographic features in Thurston County, Washington
