= Beatty Creek (Washington) =

Creek in Thurston County, Washington state

- Etymology: Daniel C. Beatty

Physical characteristics
- Source: Capitol Forest
  - elevation: 381 feet (116 m)
- Mouth
  - coordinates: 46°59′31″N 123°01′24″W

Basin features
- Tributaries
  - right: McLane Creek
- GNIS feature ID: 1511606

Beatty Creek is a stream in Thurston County in the U.S. state of Washington, and a tributary of McLane Creek. Beatty Creek has the name of Daniel C. Beatty, a pioneer settler.

== See also ==
- List of geographic features in Thurston County, Washington
