= Lake Lois =

Lake in Thurston County, Washington state

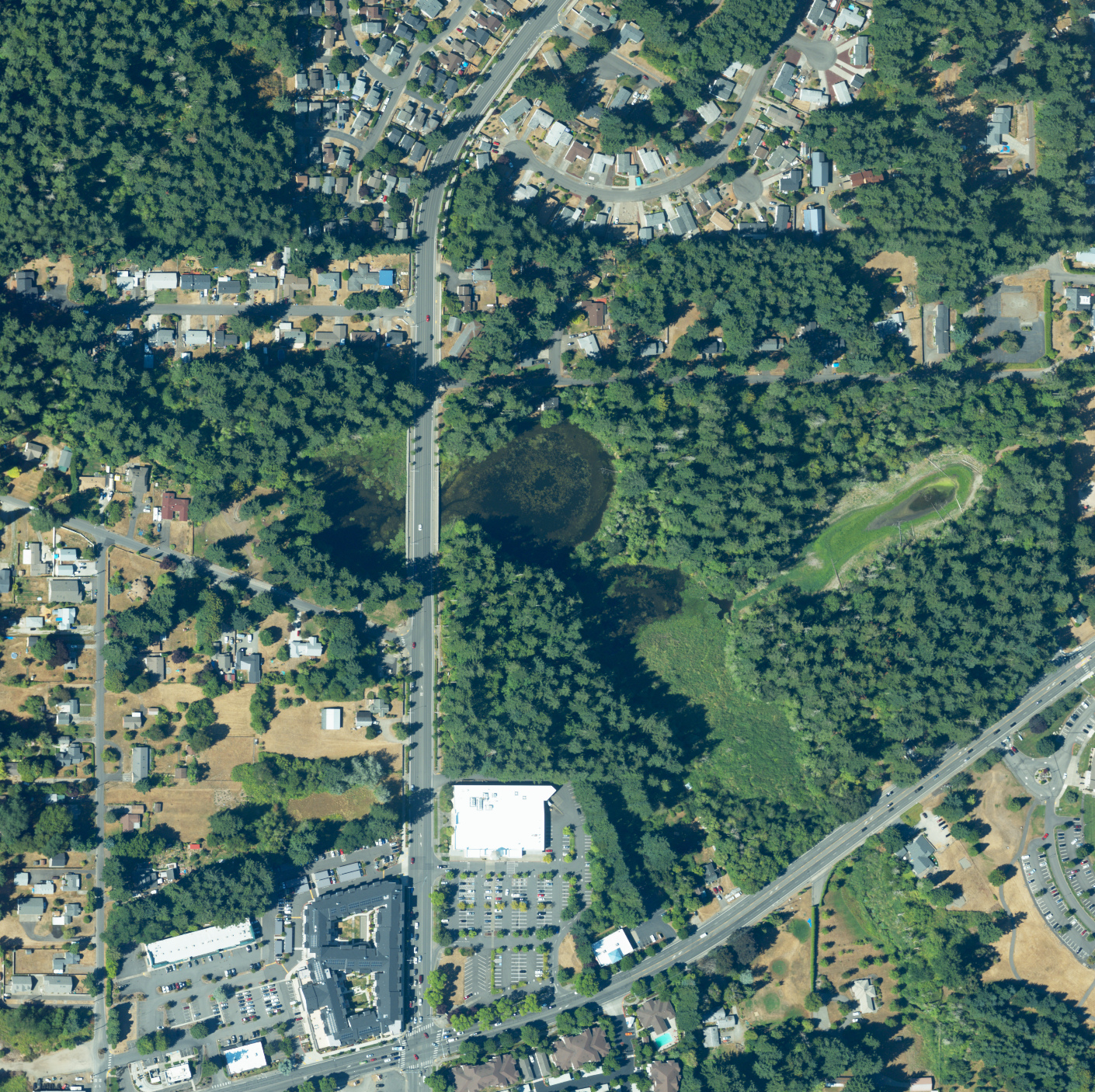
- Lake Lois, 2023
- Location: Washington, United States
- Coordinates: 47°02′27″N 122°47′52″W
- Type: Lake
- Etymology: Lois McKinney
- Surface area: 1.5 acres (0.61 ha)
- References: Geographic Names Information System: 1511915

Lake Lois is a lake in the U.S. state of Washington. The lake has a surface area of 1.5 acres (0.61 ha).

Lake Lois was named after Lois McKinney, the daughter of the proprietor of a nearby resort.

== See also ==
- List of geographic features in Thurston County, Washington
