= Longs Pond =

Lake in Thurston County, Washington state

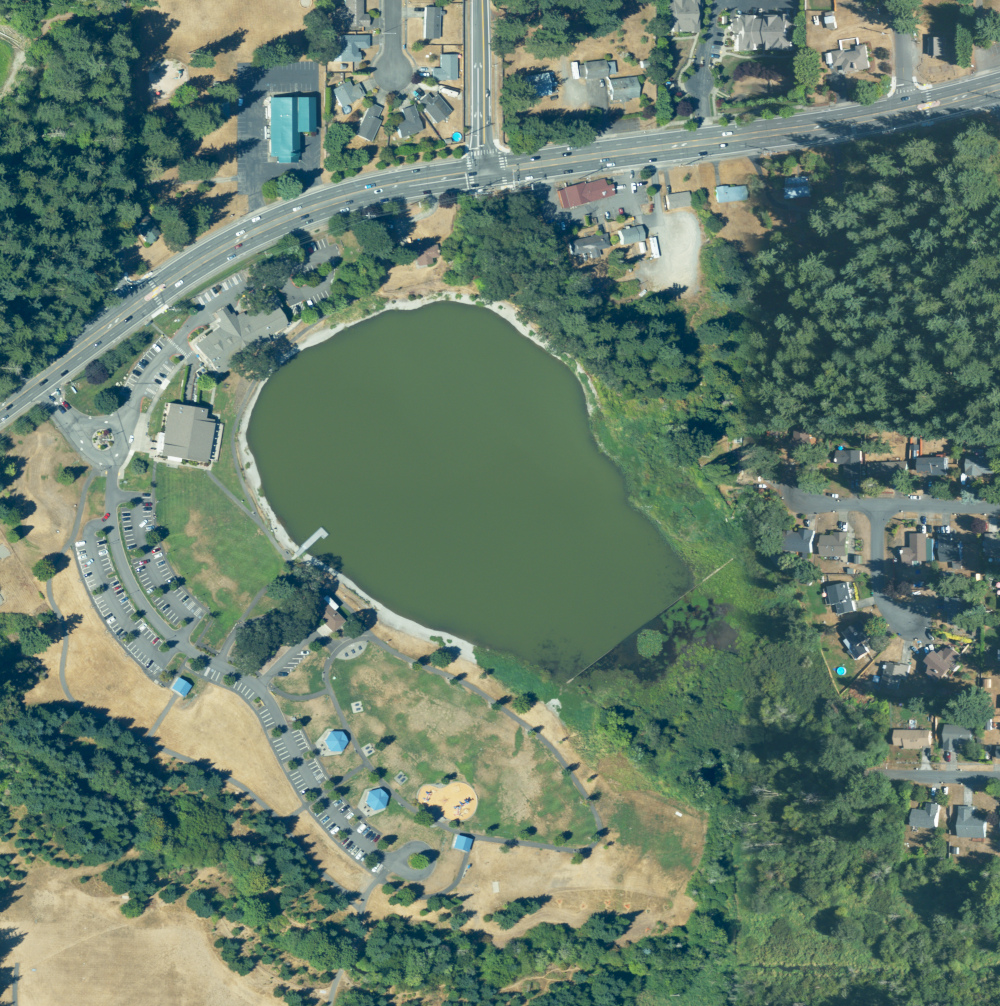
- Longs Pond, 2023
- Location: Woodland Creek Community Park, Lacey, Thurston County, Washington
- Coordinates: 47°02′22″N 122°47′29″W
- Type: lake
- Etymology: Jeremiah and Anna Long
- Surface area: 11 acres (4.5 ha)
- References: Geographic Names Information System: 2765165

Longs Pond is a lake within the Woodland Creek Community Park of Lacey, Washington. It has a surface area of 11 acres (4.5 ha).

Longs Pond was named after Jeremiah and Anna Long, local residents.

== See also ==
- List of geographic features in Thurston County, Washington
