= Lake Saint Clair (Washington) =

Lake in Thurston County, Washington state

- Location: Thurston County, Washington
- Coordinates: 47°00′01″N 122°43′12″W
- Type: Natural freshwater lake
- Basin countries: United States
- Max. length: 1.63 mi (2.62 km)
- Max. width: 0.35 mi (0.56 km)
- Surface area: 244 acres (99 ha)
- Max. depth: 110 ft (34 m)
- Surface elevation: 72 ft (22 m)
- Islands: Various islands and islets
- References: Geographic Names Information System: 1508007

Lake Saint Clair is a lake in the U.S. state of Washington. The lake has a surface area of 244 acres (99 ha) and reaches a depth of 110 feet (34 m). It is a kettle lake with no outlet and is fed from Eaton Creek to the South.

The lake's name is a transfer from Lake St. Clair, in Michigan. The lake has four islands; two of them are named as Dollar and Goat islands.

In June 2025, swimmer's itch was reported at the lake, prompting Thurston County to issue a public advisory to avoid swimming there.

== See also ==
- List of geographic features in Thurston County, Washington
