= Prairie Creek (Chehalis River tributary) =

Creek in Thurston County, Washington state

- Interactive map of Creek location
- Etymology: Named after surrounding prairie

Location
- Country: United States
- State: Washington
- County: Thurston County

Physical characteristics
- Mouth
  - coordinates: 46°47′34″N 123°02′33″W

Basin features
- River system: Chehalis River
- Geographic Names Information System: 1507616

Prairie Creek is a stream in Thurston County in the U.S. state of Washington. It is a tributary to the Chehalis River.

Prairie Creek was so named for the prairie near its course.

== See also ==
- List of geographic features in Thurston County, Washington
