= Green Cove (Washington) =

Bay in Puget Sound, Washington state

Coordinates: 47°05′52″N 122°57′06″W

Green Cove is a bay in the U.S. state of Washington.

Green Cove was so named on account of the green foliage lining the bay.

== See also ==
- List of geographic features in Thurston County, Washington
