= Setchfield Lake =

Lake in Thurston County, Washington state

- Location: Thurston County, Washington
- Coordinates: 47°03′55″N 122°52′31″W
- Type: Lake
- Etymology: Daniel Setchfield
- Surface area: 6.3 acres (2.5 ha)
- Max. depth: 10 feet (3.0 m)
- Surface elevation: 171 feet (52 m)
- References: Geographic Names Information System: 1508229

Setchfield Lake is a lake in the U.S. state of Washington. The lake has a surface area of 6.3 acres (2.5 ha) and reaches a depth of 10 feet (3.0 m).

Setchfield Lake was named Daniel Setchfield, a local educator.

== See also ==
- List of geographic features in Thurston County, Washington
