= Mud Lake (Thurston County, Washington) =

Lake in Thurston County, Washington state

- Location: Thurston County, Washington
- Coordinates: 46°53′15″N 122°51′44″W
- Type: Lake
- Etymology: Muddy conditions of lake
- References: Geographic Names Information System: 1506869

Mud Lake is a lake in the U.S. state of Washington. The lake has a surface area of about 10 acres (4.0 ha).

Mud Lake was so named on account of the muddy condition of its waters.

== See also ==
- List of geographic features in Thurston County, Washington
