= McKenzie Lake (Washington) =

Lake in Thurston County, Washington state

- Mill Pond
- Location: Thurston County, Washington
- Coordinates: 46°56′16″N 122°36′49″W
- Type: Natural freshwater lake
- Basin countries: United States
- Surface elevation: 328 ft (100 m)
- Islands: one islet
- Settlements: Yelm, Washington
- References: Geographic Names Information System: 1506576

McKenzie Lake is a lake in the U.S. state of Washington.

McKenzie Lake most likely was named after Alexander and John McKenzie, local landholders. Some modern maps also name this as Mill Pond.

== See also ==
- List of geographic features in Thurston County, Washington
