= Fiander Lake =

Lake in Thurston County, Washington state

- Location within Washington (state)
- Location: Thurston County, Washington
- Coordinates: 46°56′56″N 122°41′21″W
- Type: lake
- Etymology: Richard and Betsy Fiander
- References: Geographic Names Information System: 1504863

Fiander Lake is a lake in the U.S. state of Washington. The lake has a surface area of 14.8 acres (6.0 ha) and reaches a depth of 8 feet (2.4 m).

Fiander Lake has the name of Richard and Betsy Fiander, pioneer settlers.

== See also ==
- List of geographic features in Thurston County, Washington
