= Chambers Lake (Thurston County, Washington) =

Lake in Thurston County, Washington state

- Location: Thurston County, Washington
- Coordinates: 47°01′31″N 122°50′20″W
- Type: Lake
- Etymology: Chambers family
- Surface elevation: 203 feet (62 m)
- References: Geographic Names Information System: 1503907

Chambers Lake is a lake in the U.S. state of Washington.

== History ==
Chambers Lake has the name of the local Chambers family which settled the area in the 1840s.

== Environment and ecology ==
In 2023, the lake was the first in Thurston County noted to harbor primrose willow, an invasive species from Central and South America. Known to overcrowd and disturb native habitats, the floating weed's root system also inhibits water flow, leading to a decrease in water quality. Under state law, the weed is required to be removed as water quality and recreational use of Chambers Lake were considered to be become potentially unsafe. After the discovery of the plant on the lake's shoreline, the county's public works department initially attempted to kill primrose willow using an herbicide. The agency changed tactics to manual extraction beginning in 2025; approximately 1,500 pounds (680 kg) of primrose willow was removed that year.

== See also ==
- List of geographic features in Thurston County, Washington
