= Smith Lake (Thurston County, Washington) =

Lake in Thurston County, Washington state

- Location: Thurston County, Washington
- Coordinates: 47°00′15″N 122°50′07″W
- Type: Lake
- Etymology: Jacob Smith
- Surface area: 17.7 acres (7.2 ha)
- Max. depth: 10 feet (3.0 m)
- References: Geographic Names Information System: 1508435

Smith Lake is a lake in the U.S. state of Washington. The lake has a surface area of 17.7 acres (7.2 ha) and reaches a depth of 10 feet (3.0 m).

Smith Lake was named after Jacob Smith, a pioneer settler of the 1850s.

== See also ==
- List of geographic features in Thurston County, Washington
