= Pattison Lake =

Lake in Thurston County, Washington state

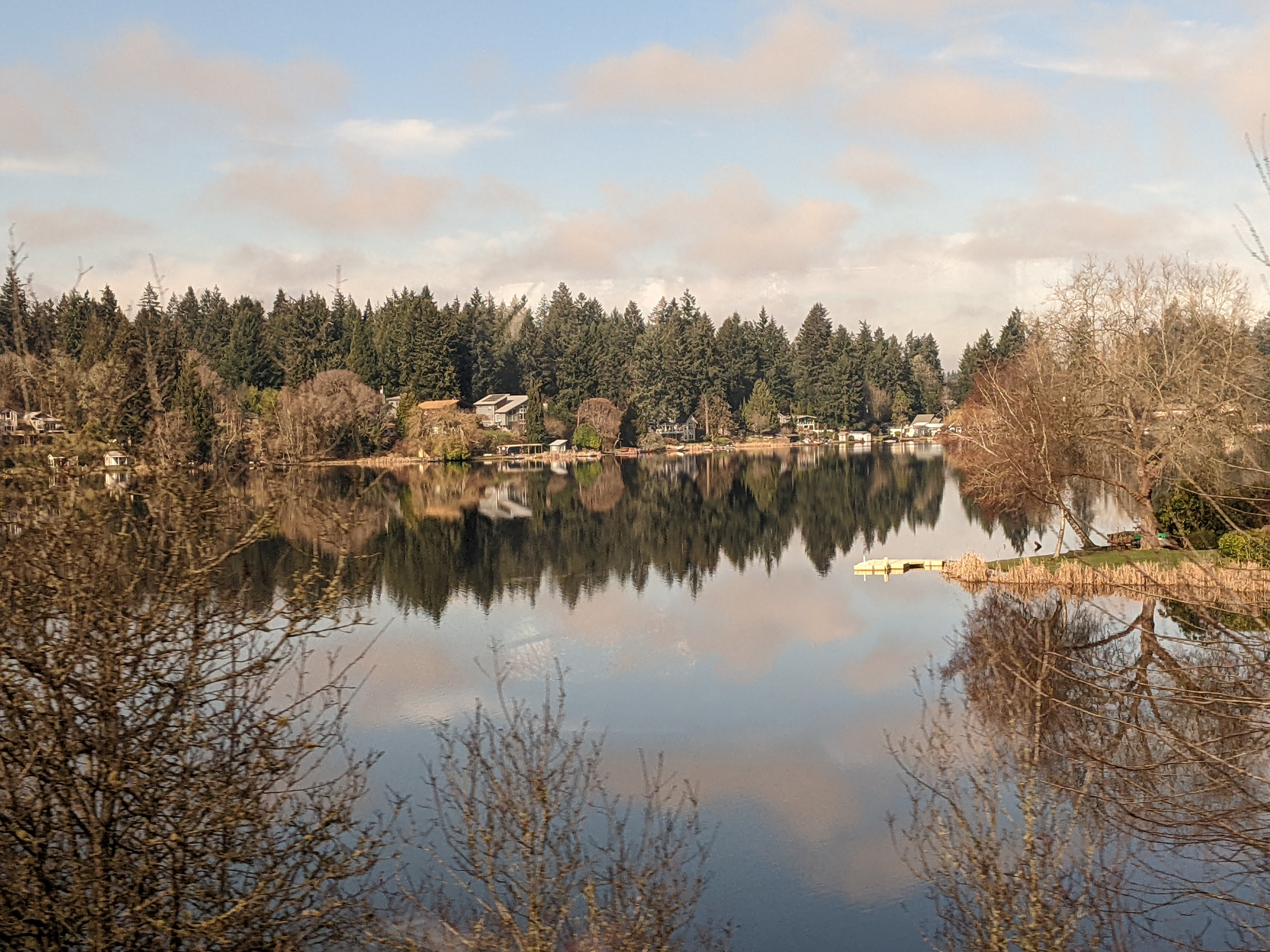
- Pattinson Lake, viewing northwest, 2025
- Location: Thurston County, Washington
- Coordinates: 46°59′43″N 122°46′39″W
- Type: Lake
- Etymology: James Pattison
- Basin countries: United States
- Surface area: 257 acres (104 ha)
- Max. depth: 20 feet (6.1 m)
- Surface elevation: 161 ft (49 m)
- References: Geographic Names Information System: 1510726

Pattison Lake is a lake in the U.S. state of Washington. The lake has a surface area of 257 acres (104 ha), and reaches a depth of 20 feet (6.1 m). The lake was named after James Pattison, a pioneer settler.

In June 2025, toxic algae was reported at the lake, prompting Thurston County to issue a public advisory to avoid swimming there. Samples collected from the lake detected Microcystins levels above state recreation guidelines. The advisory ended on July 16 after two satisfactory samples.

== See also ==
- List of geographic features in Thurston County, Washington
- List of lakes in Washington
