= Warren Point (Washington) =

Point in Puget Sound, Washington state

- Point
- Coordinates: 47°01′49″N 122°54′40″W
- Location: Olympia, Washington
- Offshore water bodies: Capitol Lake
- Etymology: Alonzo Warren
- GNIS feature ID: 1510661

Warren Point is a point in the U.S. state of Washington.

Warren Point was named after Alonzo Warren, proprietor of a local sawmill. Construction of a railroad along Warren Point altered the geography of the cape, and little remains of its former prominence.

== See also ==
- List of geographic features in Thurston County, Washington
