= Gehrke Lake =

Lake in Thurston County, Washington state

- Location: Thurston County, Washington
- Coordinates: 46°53′10″N 122°39′39″W
- Type: Lake
- Etymology: Albert Gehrke
- References: Geographic Names Information System: 1505101

Gehrke Lake is a lake in the U.S. state of Washington.

Gehrke Lake was named after Albert Gehrke, a pioneer settler.

== See also ==
- List of geographic features in Thurston County, Washington
