= Baird Cove =

Bay in Puget Sound, Washington state

Coordinates: 47°09′50″N 122°48′32″W

Baird Cove is a bay in the U.S. state of Washington.

Baird Cove has the name of Edmund Baird, a landowner.

In 2022, Baird Cove was acquired by the Nisqually Land Trust for the purposes of preservation of migrating juvenile salmon.

== See also ==
- List of geographic features in Thurston County, Washington
