= Hazard Lake =

Lake in Thurston County, Washington state

- Location within Washington (state)
- Location: Thurston County, Washington
- Coordinates: 47°01′15″N 122°53′11″W
- Type: Lake
- Etymology: Hazard Stevens
- References: Geographic Names Information System: 1511898

Hazard Lake is a lake in the U.S. state of Washington.

Hazard Lake was named after Hazard Stevens, who operated a farm near the site.

== See also ==
- List of geographic features in Thurston County, Washington
