= Gallagher Cove =

Bay in Puget Sound, Washington state

- Location within Washington (state)
- Location: Washington
- Coordinates: 47°08′33″N 122°58′44″W
- Type: Bay

Gallagher Cove is a bay in the U.S. state of Washington.

Gallagher Cove derives its name from a misspelling of the surname of John H. Galliher, a pioneer settler.

== See also ==
- List of geographic features in Thurston County, Washington
