= Lackamas Creek =

Creek in Thurston County, Washington state

Coordinates: 46°52′01″N 122°29′28″W

- Etymology: Camassia

Basin features
- Tributaries
  - right: Nisqually River

Lackamas Creek is a stream in Thurston County in the U.S. state of Washington. It is a tributary to the Nisqually River.

The name "Lackamas" is derived from that of the native camas plant, a food source of Native Americans. The name sometimes is spelled "Lacamas Creek".

== See also ==
- List of geographic features in Thurston County, Washington
