= Johnson Creek (Skookumchuck River tributary) =

Creek in Thurston County, Washington state

- Interactive map of Creek location
- Etymology: Johnson Creek Lumber Company

Location
- Country: United States
- State: Washington
- County: Thurston County

Physical characteristics
- Source
  - coordinates: 46°47′53″N 122°45′40″W

Basin features
- River system: Skookumchuck River
- Geographic Names Information System: 1521429

Johnson Creek is a stream in Thurston County in the U.S. state of Washington. It is a tributary to the Skookumchuck River.

Johnson Creek took its name from the Johnson Creek Lumber Company, which once was active near its course.

== See also ==
- List of geographic features in Thurston County, Washington
