= Ellis Creek (Budd Inlet tributary) =

Creek in Thurston County, Washington state

- Interactive map of Creek location
- Etymology: Isaac Ellis

Location
- Country: United States
- State: Washington
- County: Thurston County

Physical characteristics
- Source
  - coordinates: 47°04′26″N 122°53′43″W

Basin features
- Waterbodies: Budd Inlet
- Geographic Names Information System: 1504734

Ellis Creek is a stream in Thurston County in the U.S. state of Washington. It is a tributary to Budd Inlet.

Ellis Creek has the name of Isaac "Ike" Ellis, a local lumberman.

== See also ==
- List of geographic features in Thurston County, Washington
