= Simmons Lake (Washington) =

Lake in Thurston County, Washington state

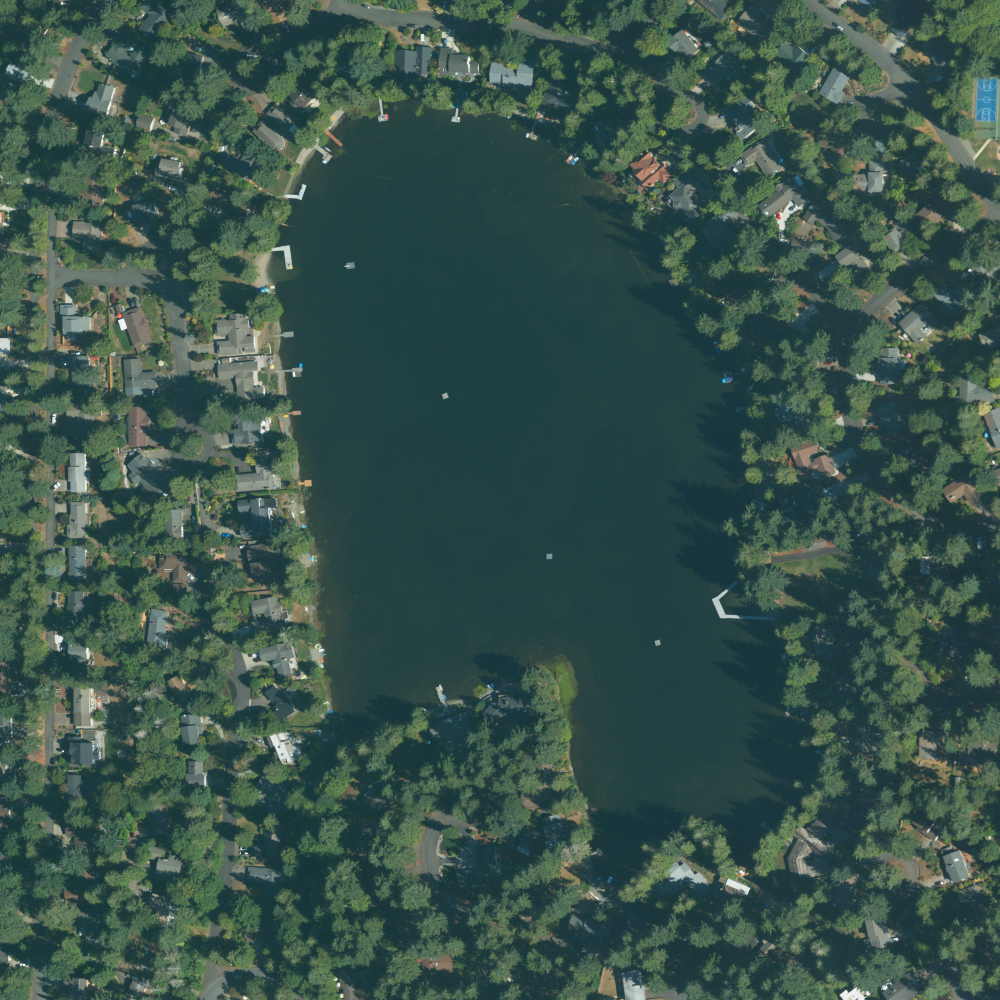
- Simmons lake in August 2023
- Location: Thurston County, Washington
- Coordinates: 47°01′57″N 122°57′02″W
- Type: Lake
- Etymology: Michael T. Simmons
- Basin countries: United States
- Surface area: 24.5 acres (9.9 ha)
- Max. depth: 12 ft (3.7 m)
- Surface elevation: 138 ft (42 m)
- References: Geographic Names Information System: 1513204

Simmons Lake is a lake in the U.S. state of Washington. The lake has a surface area of 24.5 acres (9.9 ha) and reaches a depth of 12 feet (3.7 m).

Simmons Lake was named after Michael T. Simmons, a pioneer citizen. A variant name was "Ken Lake".

== See also ==
- List of geographic features in Thurston County, Washington
