= Zangle Cove =

Bay in Puget Sound, Washington state

Coordinates: 47°08′42″N 122°53′32″W

Zangle Cove is a bay in the U.S. state of Washington in Thurston County, Washington.

Zangle Cove derives its name from Martin Sangle, a local landholder.

== See also ==
- List of geographic features in Thurston County, Washington
