= Elbow Lake (Thurston County, Washington) =

Lake in Thurston County, Washington state

- Location within Washington (state)
- Location: Thurston County, Washington
- Coordinates: 46°50′04″N 122°27′25″W
- Type: lake
- Etymology: Bent shape of lake
- References: Geographic Names Information System: 1519230

Elbow Lake is a lake in the U.S. state of Washington.

Elbow Lake was so named on account of its bent-shaped outline.

== See also ==
- List of geographic features in Thurston County, Washington
