= Goodwin Lake (Thurston County, Washington) =

Lake in Thurston County, Washington state

- Location within Washington (state)
- Location: Thurston County, Washington
- Coordinates: 46°53′44″N 122°36′41″W
- Type: Lake
- Etymology: William Goodwin
- References: Geographic Names Information System: 1505181

Goodwin Lake is a lake in the U.S. state of Washington.

Goodwin Lake was named after William Goodwin, a businessperson in the local lumber industry.

== See also ==
- List of geographic features in Thurston County, Washington
