= Hunter Point (Washington) =

Point in Puget Sound, Washington state

- Point
- Coordinates: 47°10′24″N 122°55′10″W
- Location: Thurston County, Washington
- Offshore water bodies: Squaxin Passage
- Etymology: Alfred Allen Hunter
- GNIS feature ID: 1533042

Hunter Point is a point in the U.S. state of Washington.

Hunter Point was named after Alfred Allen Hunter, an early settler.

== See also ==
- List of geographic features in Thurston County, Washington
