= McAllister Creek (Iowa) =

Stream in Iowa, U.S.

Coordinates: 41°48′49″N 91°38′46″W

McAllister Creek is a stream in the U.S. state of Iowa. It is a tributary to the Iowa River.

McAllister Creek was named after James McAlister, a pioneer settler.
