= Dana Passage =

Channel in Puget Sound, Washington state

Coordinates: 47°09′46″N 122°52′07″W

Dana Passage is a channel in the U.S. state of Washington.

Dana Passage was named after James Dwight Dana, a member of an 1841 exploring party.

== See also ==
- List of geographic features in Thurston County, Washington
