= Shell Point (Washington) =

Point in Puget Sound, Washington state

- Point
- Coordinates: 47°04′32″N 122°59′53″W
- Location: Thurston County, Washington
- Offshore water bodies: Mud Bay
- Etymology: Clam and oyster shells
- GNIS feature ID: 1508285

Shell Point is a point in the U.S. state of Washington.

Shell Point was so named on account of clam and oyster shells.

== See also ==
- List of geographic features in Thurston County, Washington
