= Kennedy Creek (Washington) =

Creek in Mason and Thurston County, Washington state

- Etymology: Franklin Kennedy

Location
- Country: United States
- State: Washington
- County: Mason County, Thurston County

Physical characteristics
- Mouth: Totten Inlet
  - coordinates: 47°05′42″N 123°05′23″W

Basin features
- Geographic Names Information System: 1505945

Kennedy Creek is a stream in Mason County and Thurston counties in the U.S. state of Washington. It is a tributary to Totten Inlet.

Kennedy Creek has the name of Franklin Kennedy, a local judge.

== See also ==
- List of geographic features in Thurston County, Washington
