= Mima Creek =

Stream in Thurston County, Washington, U.S.

Coordinates: 46°51′16″N 123°05′00″W

- Etymology: Native American language, meaning "a little further along" or "downstream"

Physical characteristics
- Source
  - location: Capitol State Forest

Basin features
- River system: Black River
- Waterfalls: Mima Falls

Mima Creek is a stream in Thurston County in the U.S. state of Washington. It is a tributary to the Black River. The upper course of Mima Creek contains the Mima Falls, a waterfall.

"Mima" is a name derived from a Native American language meaning "a little further along" or "downstream".

== See also ==
- List of geographic features in Thurston County, Washington
