= Eld Inlet =

Inlet in Puget Sound, Washington state

- Location: Thurston County, Washington
- Coordinates: 47°4′57″N 122°59′21″W
- Type: Inlet
- Part of: South Puget Sound
- Ocean/sea sources: Salish Sea

Eld Inlet is an inlet located at the southern end of Puget Sound in Thurston County, Washington. It is the second southernmost arm of Puget Sound after neighboring Budd Inlet.

== Etymology ==
Eld Inlet was given its present name by Charles Wilkes during the United States Exploring Expedition, to honor one of the expedition's officers, Midshipman Henry Eld.

== History ==
In May 1792 Peter Puget and Joseph Whidbey of the Vancouver Expedition explored Eld Inlet. At the southern end they found a native village of about 60 inhabitants. Due to the friendly reception Puget called the place Friendly Inlet.

== Geography ==
Eld Inlet is about 6 mi (9.7 km) long and has a maximum breadth of 1.24 mi (2.00 km). McLane Creek drains into the southern end of Eld Inlet, forming a large mudflat known as Mud Bay.

== Randall Preserve and Allison Springs ==
At the southern end of Eld Inlet is the 7-acre (2.8 ha) Randall Preserve, a shoreline conservation area managed by Capitol Land Trust (CLT). Originally a private residential site, it became a conservation easement after the property was purchased by its namesake, Marjorie Randall, in 1997. Donated to CLT in 2008 upon Marjorie's death, the area was restored beginning that same year, with efforts to remove invasive species, bulkheads, and an existing home and other structures. A short interpretive trail exists in the preserve which is located next to Allison Springs, a tideland area also restored by CLT.

Allison Springs is an aquifer used by the city of Olympia. The springs are part of an overall 50-acre (20 ha) estuary site that underwent a separate restoration beginning in 2011, which included the removal of invasive plants and several impediments to water flow, including culverts and weirs. The grounds were once the site of a trout farm in the 1950s and later as a state fish hatchery. Funds for the $250,000 project were provided in part by the state's Salmon Recovery Funding Board. Additional organizations who sponsored the conservation efforts at both sites include People of Puget Sound and Stream Team.

The Mud Bay estuary sites are considered as salt marsh, tideland habitats. The ecosystem is home to chum salmon, birds such as cedar waxwings and willow flycatchers, and mammals that include American black bear, coyote, and deer.

== See also ==
- List of geographic features in Thurston County, Washington
- Totten Inlet
