= McAllister Creek (Puget Sound tributary) =

Creek in Thurston County, Washington state

Coordinates: 47°06′36″N 122°43′23″W

McAllister Creek Medicine Creek, šxʷnanəm
- Etymology: James McAllister

Basin features
- Geographic Names Information System: 1506525

McAllister Creek is a stream in Thurston County in the U.S. state of Washington. It is a tributary to Puget Sound.

McAllister Creek was named after James McAllister, a pioneer who arrived in the 1840s. The creek is also known as Medicine Creek or šxʷnanəm, to the Puyallup people.

== See also ==
- List of geographic features in Thurston County, Washington
