= Waddell Creek (Black River tributary) =

Creek in Thurston County, Washington state

- Interactive map of Creek location
- Etymology: Robert Waddell family

Location
- Country: United States
- State: Washington
- County: Thurston County

Physical characteristics
- Mouth
  - coordinates: 46°54′10″N 123°01′23″W

Basin features
- Progression: Waddell Creek→ Black River→ Chehalis River→ Pacific Ocean
- River system: Black River, Chehalis River
- Geographic Names Information System: 1511621

Waddell Creek is a stream in Thurston County in the U.S. state of Washington. It is a tributary to the Black River.

Waddell Creek was named after the family of Robert Waddell, which settled near its course in the 1850s.

== See also ==
- List of geographic features in Thurston County, Washington
