= Parks and recreation in Olympia, Washington =

Parks and recreation

Parks and recreation in Olympia, Washington, which includes recreational sites and trails, is overseen by the Olympia Parks, Arts & Recreation Department. Additional parks and trails within or near the city are managed under Thurston County oversight or by various Washington state agencies.

The first official public use site in the city began in 1850 and became known as Sylvester Park. Continued growth, especially in the 21st century, has allowed the city of Olympia, as of 2026, to amass a collection or oversight of 57 parks encompassing more than 1,400 acres (570 ha).

== History and management ==
Parks and recreation areas in the city of Olympia is overseen by the Olympia Parks, Arts & Recreation Department (OPARD). The first official park began as a land donation to the city, eventually becoming Sylvester Park, with a further purchase of a land claim in 1906 for Priest Point Park.

By 2001, the city was reported to have 21 parks encompassing 738 acres (299 ha). During a two-year period ending in 2007, the department spent $9.8 million to acquire an additional 49 acres (20 ha) split between eight park sites; the funds were provided by a temporary 3% utility tax. Several acquisitions increased the total land holdings to 1,465 acres (593 ha) in 2021. The city's public works department transferred four parcels to OPARD in September 2021. The ceded properties included Black Lake Meadows, the Taylor Wetlands, and the stormwater collection areas of Indian Creek and Yauger Park. Part of the transfer also included the Kaiser Wood, LBA Woods, and West Bay Woods open space reserves.

In 2019, OPARD implemented non-pesticide management practices and disallowed the use of Roundup.

As of 2026, the agency manages 57 parks, provides educational classes and programs, and collaborates with artists and communities to install public artworks in the city. The city contains 25 miles (40 km) of trails, a dozen athletic fields and 25 sports courts, and twelve playgrounds. Over 130 community gardens and individual public artworks are extent in Olympia. Seasonal brochures issued by the parks department in 2025 generated over 10,000 volunteer registrations and funding for scholarships for its recreation programs was listed at over $17,000.

Two parks and the Olympia Armory were renamed in January 2026 after residents of note in the Olympia community. The Olympia City Council approved the armory to be renamed the Daley Arts Center after a 1980s Olympia mayor and prominent supporter of the building, Bill Daley. Kaiser Woods was renamed Marj Yung Park. In the 1970s, Marjorie Yung was the first female Thurston County commissioner, helped to create Burfoot Park, and published a book about the plant life of Ken Lake which is situated near the renamed recreation site. Yelm Highway Park, to be developed in 2026, was renamed to the Jolene Unsoeld Community Park. Unsoeld was a state and federal legislator in Washington state representing the Olympia district.

== List of parks in Olympia, Washington ==
Unless otherwise noted, information about the following Olympia parks, such as acreage, addresses, and establishment dates, is provided by the Olympia Parks, Arts & Recreation Department. (Note: Listed years for Olympia parks and recreation sites depend on the dates being tied to an acquisition or purchase date, or when the park was beginning to be developed, or if the park had an official dedication. Several parks have multiple addresses due to having more than one access point. See sources throughout the article for the discrepancies.)

=== Neighborhood parks ===
Olympia classifies small parks, usually containing playground areas and open spaces, as neighborhood parks. The recreation sites can contain additional amenities such as picnic areas and public art, or other recreational opportunities such as athletic courts and trails.

Name	Image	Established	Location	Size	Description
8th Avenue Neighborhood Park		2007	3102 8th Avenue NE	4.0 acres (1.6 ha)	Purchased by the city for $580,000, the grounds were originally the site of a horse stable.
Bigelow Park		1943	1220 Bigelow Ave NE	1.9 acres (0.77 ha)	Picnic, playground, and recreation park named after an early settler family in Olympia. The grounds contain a public artwork space known as the Stone Amphitheater.
Burri Park		2007	2415 Burbank Ave NW	2.32 acres (0.94 ha)	Neighborhood park featuring a small trail and recreation and playground areas. The site was named after a Jim Burri, long-serving supporter of parks in Olympia.
Decatur Woods Park		2004	1015 Decatur St SW	6.27 acres (2.54 ha)	Once an apple orchard, the neighborhood site includes playgrounds, picnic amenities, and public art. A looped trail courses through a stand of Douglas fir. Developed into a park after the plot was first acquired from the school district in 1989 (Note: The land trade for Decatur Woods Park is noted by the city to have taken place in 1988.) in exchange for a parcel used to expand Garfield Elementary.
Evergreen Park		2007	1445 Evergreen Park Dr SW	4.0 acres (1.6 ha)	Purchased by the city for $74,000, the park is located near the Thurston County Courthouse.
Harry Fain's Legion Park		1987	1115 20th Ave SE	1.3 acres (0.53 ha)	Across from Watershed Park, features include a playground and nature trails in a wooded area. Gifted by its namesake to the city in 1933. Fain was a known womanizer who was killed by his wife in 1937. The park honors his days as a World War I submariner.
Kettle View Park		2011	1250 Eagle Bend Dr SE	4.8 acres (1.9 ha)	Named after glacial kettles that surround the area, features in the park include a large open space, playground, tennis court, and a short loop trail. The site was originally known as Henderson Road Park, a joint city and subdivision recreation area purchase in 2007.
Lions Park		1946	800 Wilson St SE	3.72 acres (1.51 ha)	Begun by a combined effort of Olympia's Eastside neighborhood and a local Lions Club, park features include basketball, horseshoe, and tennis courts, picnic and playground areas, and a spray park.
Margaret McKenny Park		2009	3111 21st Ave SE	4.16 acres (1.68 ha)	Site was purchased by the city in 1999 and dedicated ten years later to Margaret McKenny, a published naturalist. McKenny was a founder of Citizens for the Future, a local group that helped to save Watershed Park. Features include a basketball court, looped trail, and a playground.
McGrath Woods Park		2009	2300 Cain Rd SE	4.0 acres (1.6 ha)	Located in Southeast Olympia, the park contains an open meadow and a looped trail.
Sunrise Park		1995	505 Bing St NW	5.74 acres (2.32 ha)	First community garden within an Olympia Park, the site contains a sledding hill as well as playgrounds and a basketball court. The park began under a joint cooperation of the local community and a neighborhood association in 1991. Dedicated in 1995. The site was noted for containing the first dog park in Thurston County. Opened in 2010, it was shuttered in 2013 due to complaints over noise, parking, and animal waste.
Woodruff Park		1892 (Note: The year for Woodruff Park denotes when the land was purchased by the city.)	1500 Harrison Ave NW	2.46 acres (1.00 ha)	Named after Sam Woodruff, early Olympian developer, who sold the land to the city for $1 in 1892. Features several athletic courts, a playground, picnic shelters, and a sprayground, the first such in the city.

Additional neighborhood parks, which may be undeveloped, include the 18th Avenue and Lilly Road parcels and Olympia Park.

=== Community parks ===
Community parks in the city are considered to serve as larger recreational venues for a wider range of activities as well as increased numbers of the local population. Sites usually include athletic courts and fields, but can also be associated with community gardens or waterfront areas.

Name	Image	Established	Location	Size	Description
East Bay Viewpoint		2005	1050 East Bay Dr NE	0.1 acres (0.040 ha)	Scenic viewpoint and beach site.
East Bay Waterfront		1994	313 East Bay Drive NE	1.86 acres (0.75 ha)	Also known as East Bay Public Plaza, it was officially opened in 2012. Situated in front of the Hands On Children's Museum, the park contains a reclaimed waterway, public art, play areas, and picnic amenities with waterfront views of Budd Inlet and the Olympic Mountains.
Isthmus Park		2018	529 4th Ave W	2.34 acres (0.95 ha)	Once the site of county government buildings, the structures were razed in 2015. Park contains "Oly on Ice", the city's ice skating rink, and a pump track.
Madison Scenic Park		1989	1600 10th Ave SE	2.21 acres (0.89 ha)	Hillside residential park created in partnership with the Eastside Neighborhood Association and the city. Picnic and walking path grounds that overlook the city. The city acquired the park from the school district by 2007.
Park of the Seven Oars		1993, 2001	Olympic Way	0.90 acres (0.36 ha)	A pocket park featuring several artworks created by local artists, including a sculpture of 15 foot (4.6 m)-tall oars. The connection of the lives of indigenous people, the city's maritime history, and early settlers in the area are symbolized in the artworks, which includes specifically designed benches and mosaics. Originally a smaller park built in 1993, it was relocated 700 feet (213.4 m) in 2001 due to an infrastructure repair project in the aftermath of the 2001 Nisqually earthquake. The park oversees Budd Inlet, the Capitol campus, and the Olympia downtown core. Features a plaza and elements from the city's original Fourth Avenue Bridge.
Percival Landing Park		1978	405 Columbia St NW	3.38 acres (1.37 ha)	The park is named after a commercial steamship wharf first constructed by Sam Percival in 1860. Completed in three phases between 1978 and 1988, the park is located in Downtown Olympia. Percival Landing features a 0.9-mile (1.4 km) boardwalk paralleling the Budd Bay shoreline. Noted for its public art displays, the park contains several picnic and play areas, and the Harbor House, a city-owned building that can be rented for various uses. The annual Olympia Harbor Days festival is centered around the landing; the site is home to the historic Sand Man tugboat.
Rebecca Howard Park		2021	911 Adams St SE	0.34 acres (0.14 ha)	An in-development downtown park named after Rebecca G. Howard, an African-American businesswoman and community leader who owned a popular and respected hotel in Olympia during the mid-19th century. The parcel, located behind the Olympia Timberland Regional Library, was purchased by the city in 2018 and contains a remodeled "eco-building" home originally constructed in 1931.
Yashiro Japanese Garden		1990	1010 Plum St SE	0.74 acres (0.30 ha)	Created by the Olympia-Yashiro Sister City Association, the Japanese-styled garden features public art, an 18 foot (5.5 m)-tall granite pagoda, a sculpted garden and landscape with koi pond, and symbolic features between the two cities. The town of Yashiro donated several items, including stone lanterns and cedar entrance gates constructed without the use of nails. The gardens were part of a land sale to the Squaxin Indian Tribe in 2025; the site is planned to be razed for future development necessitating a relocation.

Heritage Park is also listed under the classification.

=== Open space parks ===
Open spaces in Olympia are usually bereft of improvements or amenities such as athletic fields or playgrounds. The habitats, outside of bathrooms, parking, or trails, are often left in their natural state. Such spaces may include a variety of aquatic ecosystems, such as creeks, marine shorelines, rivers, or wetlands, as well as forest or prairie habitats.

Name	Image	Established	Location	Size	Description
Bigelow Springs Park		1994	930 Bigelow Ave NE	1.3 acres (0.53 ha)	Contains a butterfly and hummingbird garden and a natural artesian well on grounds once a homestead of the Daniel Bigelow family. Picnic area is an open space on a steep hillside, which is known as "The Place" for snow sledding.
Cooper Crest Park		2003	3600 20th Ave NW	13.37 acres (5.41 ha)	Also known as Cooper Crest Open Space, features a 0.25-mile (0.40 km) path accessed by two separate trailheads. The grounds are part of a larger aquifer recharge zone in the area.
Marj Yung Park		2025	4300 Park Dr SE; 2549 Black Lake Blvd SW	70.19 acres (28.40 ha)	Previously named Kaiser Woods, the forested site (Note: The forest at Marj Yung Park is listed, as of 2026, to contain approximately 24,000 trees.) was purchased by the city in 2015 along with an additional parcel in 2020. Remained undeveloped until 2025. First park in Olympia with intentional mountain biking trails with an official system approved in 2026. Includes more than 5 miles (8.0 km) of mixed-use paths.
Springwood Drive Parcel		2015	1500 Springwood Ave NE	3.19 acres (1.29 ha)	Park was originally formed in the 1960s as a rhododendron garden maintained by the Zabel family. Purchased as a preserved site by a local foundation in 2007, the grounds were donated to the city in 2015.
Trillium Park		late 1980s	900 Governor Stevens Avenue SE; 901 Eskridge Blvd SE	4.53 acres (1.83 ha)	A wetland pond, home to Chorus frogs, borders the park. Steep trails connect two residential communities. The ravine and open space area was donated as a preserve by landowners in the late 1980s.
Watershed Park		1955	2500 Henderson Blvd SE (Note: Watershed Park has multiple access points; the Henderson address is considered the main entrance, containing a parking lot.)	153.03 acres (61.93 ha)	Part of the Moxlie Creek Springs Basin which was once the main water source of the city. The moderate to steep 1.5-mile (2.4 km) G. Eldon Marshall trail loops around the park and wetland area. The site was created as a park after it was saved in the 1950s by the local community group, Citizens for the Future.
West Bay Woods		2016, 2017	1200 Hays Ave NW; 1415 West Bay Dr NW	18.5 acres (7.5 ha)	Began as a local conservation effort in 2014, the two-parcel site was purchased by Olympia resident Alicia Elliot that same year. The city bought the sites between 2016 and 2017. The rookery preserve surrounds Olympia's only great blue heron colony. A nature trail in the park connects neighborhoods in West Olympia and to West Bay Park. In 2020, the preserve expanded after an 7-acre (2.8 ha) parcel was acquired by the Bowen Foundation and the Olympia Coalition for Ecosystems Preservation.

Additional open space parks and trails, which may be undeveloped, include the Garfield Nature Trail, the Karen Fraser Woodland Trail, the South Capitol Lots, and the Wildwood Glen and Yew Avenue parcels.

=== Multi-classified parks ===
The list below includes parks that are classified under a combination of community, neighborhood, or open space areas and parks.

West Bay Park received grants of more than $566,000 in 2026, split between the city and the Washington State Department of Ecology, to further continue remediation of the site for a potential "estuarine garden" park spanning up to 17 acres (6.9 ha). Contamination of the lands include the removal of petroleum and creosote-connected pollutants, which is planned to begin in 2027. Habitat restoration includes the expansion or improvements of aquatic and intertidal areas, the removal of a rail berm, and the creation of islands and a trail system. The project, not fully funded as of 2026, is expected to cost $50 million.

Since 1983, a farm stand under Spooner Berry Farms had been located on the parcel planned to become Jolene Unsoeld Community Park. In September 2026, the stand's lease was not renewed by the city of Olympia and the stand was required to be removed, drawing local negative reaction. The city offered a possible Spooner Farms stand at the completed park in the future, though due to nature of the funding and permitting of the park, the location could not be considered permanent. The city also offered to pay for the stand's relocation.

Name	Image	Established	Location	Size	Description
Chambers Lake Trailhead Park		2008	4808 Herman Road	46.2 acres (18.7 ha)	Park contains a forested wetland area. Closed as of 2025.
Friendly Grove Park		2002	2316 Friendly Grove Road NE	14.48 acres (5.86 ha)	The grounds were originally part of an 1853 land claim and once owned by Daniel Bigelow. A baseball field was built in 1958. The parcel was purchased by the city in 1997 and opened as a neighborhood park in 2002 after a $1.2 million effort. Features include various fields and courts for sports activities including a beginner-to-intermediate skatepark, as well as picnic areas and a walking path.
Jolene Unsoeld Community Park		2026	Yelm Highway	80 acres (32 ha)(approx) (Note: The acreage for Yelm Highway Community Park varies based on the source, either as 83 acres (34 ha) or 86 acres (35 ha). See sources in the section for the discrepancy.)	Previously known as Yelm Highway Community Park, construction of the site began in 2026. The parcel was purchased by the city of Olympia in 2018; the site was to include a public school but was found in 2022 to no longer be needed. As of 2025, the city has spent $14 million at the site and is expected to receive additional funding as part of a $26 million, 30-year bond also meant to upgrade the city's National Guard Armory. The park is planned to be by 2027.
LBA Park and Woods		1974	3333 Morse-Merryman Rd SE	155.5 acres (62.9 ha)	Short for Little Baseball Association, an Olympia version of Little League. LBA Park land was donated by the group and the city built up the grounds. Expanded in 2017 after the city purchased the adjoining LBA Woods properties. The park contains a variety of athletic fields and courts, paths and trails, and picnic amenities. The first zip line in the city was installed at the park in 2011.
Mission Creek Nature Park		2007	1700 San Francisco Ave NE	37.0 acres (15.0 ha)	Accessible via multiple trailheads, the park contains a 1-mile (1.6 km) walking path. The site, first purchased by the city in 2001, is a combined effort to provide a neighborhood park and dedicated urban green space.
Squaxin Park		1905	2600 East Bay Dr NE	314.0 acres (127.1 ha)	Previously known as Priest Point Park until 2022, the area was once a trading port for the indigenous Steh-Chass. Park features include numerous nature trails, picnic amenities, play and sports areas, and beach access of up to 1.0-mile (1.6 km) of shoreline.
Stevens Park (Steven's Field)		1963	300 24th Ave SE	7.83 acres (3.17 ha) (Note: Reports on the acreage of Stevens Park list up to 24 acres (9.7 ha). The discrepancy may be due to listing of the ballfields as a separate acreage from the overall park.)	Named after Isaac Stevens and his son, Hazard. The grounds were deeded to the Olympia School District in 1921 after being sold by the Stevens family to George Mills. Early ballfields at the park, possibly in existence since the 1890s, were the first such in the city. The park has been leased to the city since 1963 and has been the home field for Olympia High School and once hosted minor league baseball. A 2,500-seat football stadium was built by the Works Progress Administration in 1934; it burned down in June 1967. Ballfield lights were installed in 1934. Park contains an athletic complex for baseball, basketball, and tennis.
Ward Lake Parcel		2007	2008 Yelm Hwy SE	9.14 acres (3.70 ha)	Mostly undeveloped, the parcel contains a dog park that was created in 2021 and as of 2025, only an upland pasture space is open for use. The grounds feature a forested hillside and a portion of shoreline at the lake. The park is a long-term effort to provide a public swimming area and beach in Olympia after the closure of water access to Capitol Lake. Issues over water quality and costs to construct the planned park has waylaid the project.
West Bay Park		2007	700 West Bay Dr NW	17.04 acres (6.90 ha)	A shoreline park that overlooks the ship canal at Budd Inlet, the Olympic Mountains, and the Washington State Capitol building. The grounds were once an industrial yard for the Port of Olympia. The land was acquired and developed using local taxes as well as state and federal grants. The park provides picnic amenities and a boat launch for hand-held aquatic vessels. As of 2026, only 4 acres (1.6 ha) are open for public use and the southern portion, including the shoreline, is access restricted due to continuing issues of contamination and other conditions deemed hazardous.
Yauger Park		1982	530 Alta St SW or 3100 Capital Mall Dr SW	48.99 acres (19.83 ha)	Mixed-use park featuring an athletic complex, community garden, skate park, and trails. Intentionally built to flood as part of stormwater system, the grounds contain a wetland preserve.

Additional parks that are multi-classified, and which may be undeveloped, include the 28th Avenue, Edison Street, Harrison Avenue, and Kaiser Road parcels. Grass Lake Nature Park is also listed under the classification.

=== Other ===
The following parks in Olympia may not be uniquely classified under OPARD or may be under other jurisdictions, such as county, private, or state ownership, or oversight under the Port of Olympia.

Name	Image	Established	Location	Size	Description
Artesian Commons		2010	415 Fourth Avenue East	0.2 acres (0.081 ha)	Begun by the city in 2010 and opened in 2014, the small commons area contains a public artesian well that has a flow rate of 10 US gallons (38 L; 8.3 imp gal) per minute. Various local and government agencies partner to oversee the park.
Black Lake Meadows		2021	3333 21st Avenue SW	45.02 acres (18.22 ha)	Near Mottman Industrial Park, contains a looped wildlife trail and is part of the city's stormwater retention and filtration system. The site is known for birdwatching and the waters contain various migrating species of salmon and trout.
Burfoot Park			6927 Boston Harbor Road NE, Boston Harbor	65.0 acres (26.3 ha)	Under oversight of Thurston County. Located on Budd Inlet, the forested site is named after the Burfoot family who once owned the land. Amenities include gardens, 3.8 miles (6.1 km) of hiking trails, picnic areas, and various wildlife viewing opportunities, including cutthroat trout, gray whales, orcas, salmon, sea lions, and tidal creatures at a 1,100 foot (340 metres) saltwater beach.
McLane Dog Park		2021	4421 Mud Bay Rd NW	5.5 acres (2.2 ha)	Originally owned by the Olympia School District, the grounds were leased to the city, constructing the park which contains areas for off-leash dogs.
West Central Park		2012	Harrison Avenue and Division Street	0.0 acres (0 ha)	Once an empty lot, the land was purchased by local resident, Alicia Elliot, and converted into a park. Under oversight of the non-profit West Central Park Project.

== State Capitol Campus parks ==
Parks within the Washington State Capitol campus are owned by the State of Washington and include Capitol Lake, Heritage, Marathon, and Sylvester parks.

Marathon Park received a new commemorative plaque in May 2026. The porcelain monument, measuring 2 ft × 3 ft (0.61 m × 0.91 m), includes the names of each runner who competed in the first ever U.S. women's Olympic marathon trial held in 1984.

Name	Image	Established	Location	Size	Description
Capitol Lake		1951	Deschutes Parkway	260.0 acres (105.2 ha)	The lake was constructed in 1951 by damming the estuary of the Deschutes River; it was meant to serve as a reflecting pool for the Capitol Building. A 1.5-mile (2.4 km) paved and gravel trail loops around the lake; the Capitol campus can be accessed from the lake via the Heritage Park Trail, a 0.5-mile (0.80 km), steep switchback pathway.
Heritage Park		1996	330 5th Ave SW	1.31 acres (0.53 ha)	Adjoining Capitol Lake, the main feature is a circular splash pad fountain that contains numerous waterjets.
Marathon Park		1970	Deschutes Parkway, west side of Capitol Lake	2.25 acres (0.91 ha)	Originally constructed out of fill in 1970, the grounds were destroyed during the 2001 Nisqually earthquake, it was reopened in 2004. A dedication ceremony and plaque honored the history and namesake of the site, the first U.S. women's Olympic marathon trial held in 1984, which started and ended at the park. A footbridge trail crosses Capitol Lake's northern and middle basins; another pathway leads under I-5 and wetland areas to Tumwater's Interpretative Park.
Sylvester Park		1850	615 Washington Street SE	1.57 acres (0.64 ha)	Named after Edmund Sylvester who donated the land to the city in 1850 for use as a public park. Situated across from the Old Capitol Building, the site is listed on the National Register of Historic Places.

== Natural areas and preserves ==
Name	Image	Established	Location	Size	Description
Grass Lake Nature Park		1980s	814 Kaiser Rd NW	195.71 acres (79.20 ha)	Previously known as Grass Lake Refuge, contains a looped trail through an intact wetland area with hundreds of various bird and plant species. Contains an artwork effort known as Grass Lake Nature Park Public Art Project.
Inspiring Kids Preserve		2027 (planned completion)	Henderson Inlet, east shore	113 acres (46 ha)	Not opened to the public as of 2026, the preserve, led by Capitol Land Trust, is planned to be completed in 2027 and will center on young people's connection to nature. The site is noted to contain almost every species of tree considered native to Washington state. The preserve is planned to protect 1 mile (1.6 km) of shoreline and provide various amenities for birdwatching.
Taylor Wetlands		2021	1300 Fones Rd SE	40.88 acres (16.54 ha)	Used as part of the city's stormwater system, the grounds contain a connecting portion of the city's Woodland Trail.
Woodard Bay Natural Resources Conservation Area		1987	Woodard and Chapman bays, Henderson Inlet	922.0 acres (373.1 ha)	Once the location of a Weyerhaeuser timber shipment facility, converted into a natural conservation area beginning in 1987. Listed on the National Register of Historic Places.

== County and state parks ==
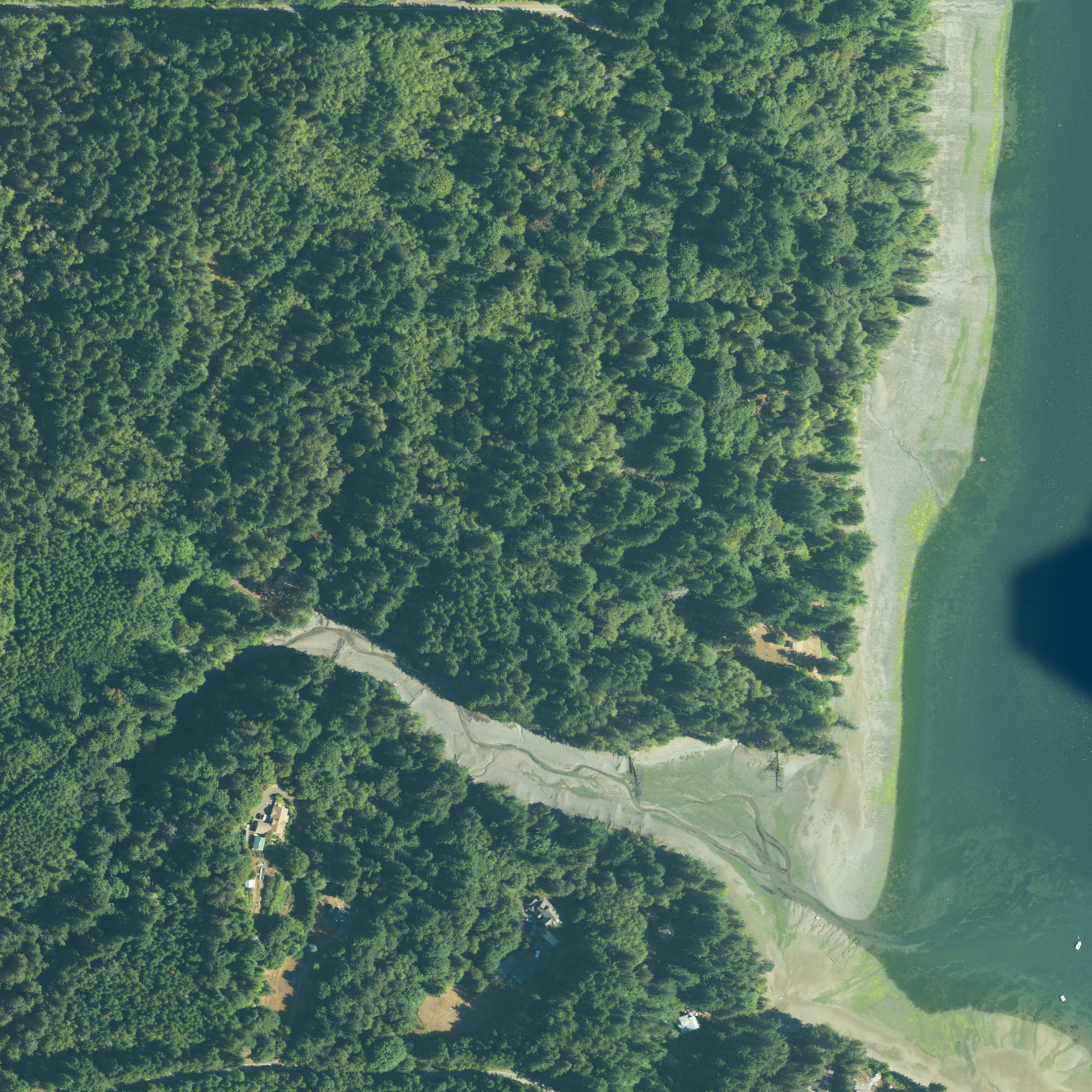
Frye Cove, 2023

Parks under the jurisdiction of Thurston County in or near Olympia include Burfoot Park, Frye Cove (County) Park on Steamboat Island and Kenneydell Park in Belmore on Black Lake. Parks under Washington state management include Tolmie State Park, east of Olympia, and the Kennedy Creek Natural Area Preserve, situated to the west.

== Trails ==
Trails within or connected to Olympia include three rail trails, the Chehalis Western Trail, the Gate to Belmore Trail, and the Karen Fraser Woodland Trail. A paved path known as the Ralph Munro Trail is located near Evergreen College. An 8-mile (13 km) paved bike trail known as the I-5 Bike Path runs parallel to the interstate and connects to both the Chehalis Western and Karen Fraser passageways.

The Chehalis Western, Gate to Belmore, and Ralph Munro trails are under county oversight.

The city created the Neighborhood Pathways Program in 2013 which, after approval from the Bicycle and Pedestrian Advisory Committee, helps to fund and construct pathways in communities to parks, streets, and other existing trails in Olympia. An early project was the connection of the Indian Creek neighborhood to the Karen Fraser Woodland Trail in 2016.

The construction of bike corridors, used to "maximize safety and streamline travel" for Olympian bike riders especially near the downtown core, was first begun by 2016. The first corridor was a 2-mile (3.2 km) stretch connecting Lions and Sylvester parks. Garfield Nature Trail connects West Bay and Westside neighborhoods through a 7.4-acre (3.0 ha) greenbelt that contains an unnamed ravine.

The city began a commuter, "multi-modal" trail system known as the Capitol to Capitol (CTC) trail, linking existing trails throughout the city between Capitol Forest and the Washington State Capitol campus. By 2025, Grass Lake Nature Park became the first, "off-street" portion of the CTC to be completed.

== Undeveloped parcels ==
Undeveloped lands for potential future use as public parks include the Harrison Avenue Parcel, a 24-acre (9.7 ha) plot in West Olympia purchased in 2011. Planning includes the connection of the site by trail to Grass Lake Nature Park.

Other undeveloped properties include the 4.89-acre (1.98 ha) Lilly Road Parcel, the Log Cabin Road Parcel measured at 2.35 acres (0.95 ha), and the South Capitol Lots which encompasses less than an acre.

== Venues ==
Properties under OPARD management or ownership include The Olympia Center, a 56,000-square-foot (5,200 m^{2}) community center, and the Olympia Armory, transferred by the state to the city in 2021.

== Public art ==
In 2026, at Olympia-Yashiro Friendship Bridge near Isthmus Park, a Coast Salish art carving, known as a Welcome Figure, was permanently installed. Given the title Mother of Restoration, the 10 foot (3.0 m)-tall old-growth cedar statue is known in Lushootseed as sk̓ʷuy ʔə ti həliʔil, translated as mother of living or life progressive. The carving symbolizes an ongoing agreement between the tribe and the city of Olympia to "promote a healthy exchange of cultures" via community services, education, and public art. The carving is also meant to represent a commitment to complete an urban restoration effort known as the Deschutes Estuary Project, which will recreate natural habitats within the estuary by reintroducing tidal flow to Capitol Lake after the removal of the 5th Avenue Dam located near the site. Other Welcome Figures in Olympia include an installation at Squaxin Park, known as "Steh-Chass Man", and a carving at South Puget Sound Community College titled, "Bigger".

The city promotes public art at major entry points into Olympia through a program known as the Olympia Crossings initiative. Planned since 2014 to include eight artworks, the installation efforts began in 2018. Three artworks have been completed by 2026 and include "Guardians/Watcher and Fighter" on West Bay Drive, "Unity/Tree People and People of the Water" on Eastside Street, and at the intersection of Martin way and Pacific Avenue, the sculpture, "Crossroads of Connection/Roots and Fruits". The next public art pieces to be installed are planned to be located at the junction of Harrison Avenue and Division Street and at Henderson and Eskridge Boulevard.

== Other recreation ==
The county's annual Bicycle Community Challenge (BCC), also known as the Bicycle Commuter Contest, was first held in Olympia in 1988; the event, held during the month of May, is considered the oldest bicycle commuter contest in Washington state. The BCC is a free program meant to motivate residents to use bicycles as a main mode of transportation.

== See also ==
- Black River National Wildlife Refuge
- Billy Frank Jr. Nisqually National Wildlife Refuge
- List of parks and recreation in Thurston County, Washington
- List of public art in Olympia, Washington
- Monarch Contemporary Art Center and Sculpture Park
- Tumwater Falls
