= List of parks and recreation in Thurston County, Washington =

The county parks system in Thurston County, Washington is overseen by the Thurston County Public Works Department and contains such sites as Burfoot Park, Deschutes Falls Park, and Kenneydell Park. The agency also oversees and cooperates with cities, towns, and other municipalities and organizations throughout the county in maintaining historical buildings and spaces, as well as recreational spaces.

Thurston County is home to state and federally protected natural areas such as Billy Frank Jr. Nisqually National Wildlife Refuge, Mima Mounds Natural Area Preserve, and units in the Scatter Creek Wildlife Area. State parks located in the county include Capitol State Forest, Millersylvania State Park, and Tolmie State Park. The Washington State Capitol parks, such as Capitol Lake and Sylvester Park, as well as the Woodard Bay Natural Resources Conservation Area, listed on the National Register of Historic Places, are also situated within the borders of Thurston County.

== History ==
Four officially developed parks, Burfoot, Frye Cove, Kenneydell, and a recreation site known as ORV Sports Park, were listed as under management of the Thurston county parks department by 1997; five additional, undeveloped "recreation sites" were also reported. By 1999, the Thurston County Parks and Recreation Department (TCPRD) oversaw 27 sites encompassing more than 3,000 acres (1,200 ha),

One of the department's largest land purchases was the 155-acre (63 ha) Deschutes Falls site in 1992 at a cost of $838,000, equivalent to $1,922,611 in 2025. The department, in December 1997, spent $460,000, equivalent to $922,575 in 2025, to expand Kenneydell Park by 23 acres (9.3 ha), more than doubling the 18-acre (7.3 ha) grounds.

During transport of rocks in Eld Inlet for a shoreline landscaping project, a diesel-fuel spill of 150 US gallons (570 L; 120 imp gal) during the sinking of a motorized barge occurred in March 2003. The owner of the boat, Dean Edenstrom, elected to construct a granite, nine-step stairway at Frye Cove Park in lieu of a $3,000 fine from the Washington Department of Ecology (WSDOE). Completed during the 2004 summer season, the stairs allowed access from the picnic area to the beach, a project long planned by the county parks department to replace an existing access point that was failing due to shoreline erosion. At the time under a WSDOE option, polluters were allowed to offset a penalty by instead financing projects of environmental benefit; the remorseful Edenstrom spent $1,000 more on the steps than the proposed fine.

At the end of May 2009, the Thurston County Parks and Recreation Department was shuttered; the action was based on "budget reductions caused by declining tax revenues". Most operations were absorbed by, or transferred to, other agencies. The oversight of maintenance of existing parks was placed under the Thurston County Public Works Department; remaining recreation programs were overseen by a resource stewardship agency. During the last seven years of the TCPRD, the number of recognized parks in the county increased from six to 34, with an increase of total acreage of developed and undeveloped parcels from 600 acres (240 ha) to 2,800 acres (1,100 ha). Public trails in Thurston County also increased, with an approximate addition of 50 miles (80 km) during the same period.

Parks in the county were closed and reopened several times during the Covid-19 pandemic, including during the spring season, 2020.

== Parks ==
Name	Image	Established	Location	Size	Description
Burfoot Park		before 1997 (Note: The official years that Burfoot, Frye Cove, and Kenneydell parks were established have not yet been found in sources but the sites are known to have been opened to the public by 1997. Various reports mention the parks were started under certain city councils, or spearheaded by prominent council members, during the 1970s and 1980s. The beginnings of Burfoot Park were noted to have taken place under an effort led by the League of Women Voters of Thurston County. See sources used throughout the article.)	6927 Boston Harbor Road NE, Boston Harbor	65.0 acres (26.3 ha)	Located on Budd Inlet, the forested site is named after the Burfoot family who once owned the land. Amenities include gardens, 3.8 miles (6.1 km) of hiking trails, picnic areas, and various wildlife viewing opportunities, including cutthroat trout, gray whales, orcas, salmon, sea lions, and tidal creatures at a 1,100 foot (340 metres) saltwater beach.
Closed Loop Park		2000s (Note: No sourcing has yet been found for the year Closed Loop Park was opened. Based on reports, the park was noted to be opened to the public during the mid-to-late 2000s. See sources in the section.)	2420 Hogum Bay Rd NE, Lacey (Note: The locations of Closed Loop and Off-Leash Dog parks are also commonly reported to be in Hawks Prairie. See sources for the differing geographic designation.)	2.0 acres (0.81 ha)	Located at the Thurston County Waste and Recovery Center, the park was named as it "closed the loop" from landfill to reclaimed space; the site is also known as Closed Loop Park Demonstration Garden. Contains a gazebo and picnic area within the garden grounds.
Deschutes Falls Park		2017 (opened)	25005 Bald Hill Road, Yelm	155.0 acres (62.7 ha)	Located on the Deschutes River approximately 15 miles (24 km) southeast of Yelm, the area was closed to the public since the site was purchased by the county in 1992. The park was the location of a private campground between the 1940s and 1980s, and possibly as early as the 1920s. Picnic shelters originally built by the Civilian Conservation Corps and a mobilehome were removed; two barns collapsed after years of decay. A small cabin was saved. The park opened on September 1, 2017. The waterfall is approximately 25 feet (7.6 m) tall and the forested site contains Douglas fir, Garry oak, Pacific yew and Western red cedar. The two-tier waterfall drops into a 90 foot (27 m) gorge that spans 400 feet (121.9 m) in length.
Frye Cove Park		before 1997	4000 NW 61st Avenue, Olympia	67.0 acres (27.1 ha)	The park, located on Eld Inlet, contains 2 miles (3.2 km) of trails and 1,400 feet (426.7 m) of saltwater beach. Sea lions and seals are often spotted in the waters and a variety of migrating and year-round shorebirds, including heron, live at the site. Visitors may harvest shellfish and can reserve two sheltered picnic sites. The forested portion of the park contains trees such as alder, cedar, Douglas fir, and Pacific Madrona.
Glacial Heritage Preserve		2005	15044 Mima Road SW, Olympia	80.0 acres (32.4 ha)	Also known as the Glacial Heritage Wildlife Area Unit, the site is part of the Scatter Creek Wildlife Area and is located directly south of the Mima Mounds Natural Area Preserve. The prairie grassland unit protects rare and threatened plant species located within the preserve; the unit is open to the public only one day per year, known as Prairie Appreciation Day. The southern end of the Gate to Belmore Trail is near the preserve.
Guerin Park		1976 (purchased)	6500 Nels Street SW, Olympia	53.4 acres (21.6 ha)	The forested, mostly undeveloped park is located on the western shore of Black Lake, opposite Kenneydell Park. Contains 1,180 feet (359.7 m) of wetland shoreline. Purchased by the county in 1976, development of the grounds has been prevented due to the wetland areas throughout the site.
Kenneydell Park		before 1997	6745 SW Fairview Road, Olympia	40.0 acres (16.2 ha)	The park is located on the eastern shore of Black Lake with access to approximately 1,000 feet (304.8 m) of freshwater beach and a swimming area and dock. Situated at the site is the Kenneydell Lodge and other picnic shelters, as well as sports fields, trails, and two playgrounds. The forested section of the park contains alder, cedar, Douglas fir, and maple, with an understory of bleeding heart, fern, and salal. A variety of mammals, waterfowl, and other avian species such as osprey and owls, inhabit the lands and waters of the park.
Off-Leash Dog Park		2010 (completed)	2420 Hogum Bay Road NE, Lacey	5.0 acres (2.0 ha) (Note: The acreage for the Off-Leash Dog Park varies per source as either 5 acres (2.0 ha) or 6 acres (2.4 ha) in size. See sources for the discrepancy.)	The dog park is situated next to Closed Loop Park at the Thurston County Waste and Recovery Center on a landfill section once known as South 40. The entrance into the site contains a bone-shaped brick pathway. First approved in 2009, the $200,000 park, equivalent to $300,140 in 2025, was considered to be the first of its kind in the county. Opened in late-October 2010, the Off-Leash Dog Park ended up being the second in the county, as a dog park opened at Olympia's Sunrise Park earlier that month.

== Trails ==
Outside of trails located within county, state, or federal parks, Thurston County features a large, connecting trail system within its borders. Four rail trails, the Chehalis Western Trail, the Gate to Belmore Trail, the Karen Fraser Woodland Trail, and Yelm–Rainier–Tenino Trail are located in the county. A paved path known as the Ralph Munro Trail is located near Evergreen College. An 8-mile (13 km) paved bike trail known as the I-5 Bike Path runs parallel to the interstate and connects to both the Chehalis Western and Karen Fraser passageways.

The Chehalis Western, Gate to Belmore, Ralph Munro, and Yelm–Rainier–Tenino trails are under county oversight. As of 2026, there are 47.5 miles (76.4 km) of combined recreational trails in Thurston County.

== Other parks ==
=== Federally managed protected areas ===
Federally managed protected areas that reside partially or solely in Thurston County include:

- Billy Frank Jr. Nisqually National Wildlife Refuge

=== Washington state parks ===
Washington state parks that reside partially or solely in Thurston County include:

- Capitol State Forest
- Kennedy Creek Natural Area Preserve
- Millersylvania State Park
- Mima Mounds Natural Area Preserve
- Scatter Creek Wildlife Area and connected units
- Tolmie State Park
- Washington State Capitol parks - Capitol Lake, Heritage Park, Marathon Park, and Sylvester Park
- Woodard Bay Natural Resources Conservation Area

== See also ==
- List of geographic features in Thurston County, Washington
- List of Washington state parks
- Parks and recreation in Olympia, Washington
