= Woodard Bay Natural Resources Conservation Area =

Natural reserve in Olympia, Washington, US

- Weyerhaeuser South Bay Log Dump Rural Historic Landscape
- U.S. National Register of Historic Places
- U.S. Historic district
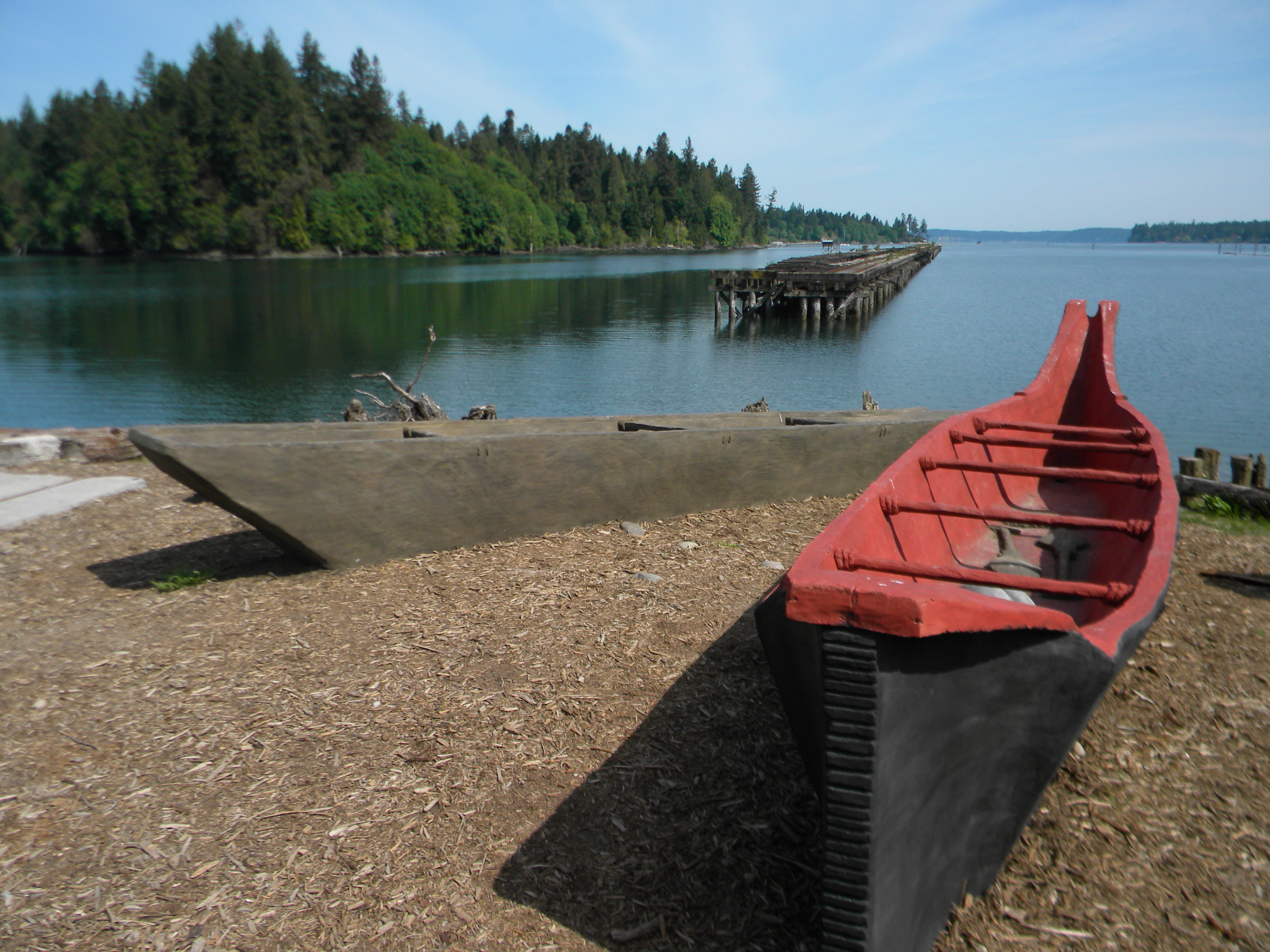
- Weyerhaeuser South Bay Log Dump, 2015
- Interactive map of Reserve location
- Nearest city: Olympia, Washington
- Coordinates: 47°8′11″N 122°50′42″W
- Area: 922 acres (373 ha)
- Built: 1928
- NRHP reference No.: 91001441
- Added to NRHP: October 2, 1991

Woodard Bay Natural Resources Conservation Area is a natural reserve in Olympia, Washington, protected under the Washington Natural Areas Program. Once an important processing facility for the logging industry, it has been designated as the Weyerhaeuser South Bay Log Dump Rural Historic Landscape.

The protected area is a sanctuary for a variety of birds, harbor seals, river otters, bald eagles, and a colony of bats, as well as serving as a great blue heron rookery. Part of a conservation program begun in 1987 between the State of Washington and the Washington Department of Natural Resources, the site is one the first of its kind in the state.

== History ==
Native Americans' use of the area dates back over 5,000 years when the present coastline stabilized. Indigenous tribes harvested fish and shellfish, as well as gathered materials for tasks such as basketmaking; archaeological sites of shellfish harvesting exist in the present day throughout the protected area. Euroamerican settlement began in the 1850s with Puget Sound's logging era. The bay was named after Harvey and Solome Woodard, pioneers who arrived in 1853.

In the 1920s the site was bought by the Weyerhaeuser Timber Company, which brought up to 1 million board feet of timber to the site annually by rail from various locations in Thurston and Lewis counties; the company site closed in 1984. A former logging railroad crosses Woodard Bay on a wooden trestle and a narrow peninsula. The tracks follow onto a pier in Henderson Inlet across the mouth of Chapman Bay where logs were dumped in the water, gathered into rafts, and floated to mills in Everett.

The site was designated a conservation area in 1987 by the Washington State Legislature and was one of the first such of its type in the state. Originally 400 acres (160 ha) when it was formally purchased from Weyerhaeuser in 1988 by the Washington Department of Natural Resources (WADOE). The area doubled in size to approximately 800 acres (320 ha) with the addition of a 90-acre (36 ha) parcel in 2008. The $2.4 million expansion in 2008 was undertaken by the Washington Wildlife and Recreation Program and deeded to the WADOE; the expanded area included a freshwater pond, former pasture land, and forested grounds.

An environmental and education facility was completed at Weyer Point in 2015.

== Geography ==
Woodard Bay Natural Resources Conservation Area is located north of Olympia, Washington and Squaxin Park. Situated at the northern terminus of the Chehalis Western Trail and the shore of Henderson Inlet, the protected site, as of 2026, encompasses 922 acres (373 ha).

== Environment and ecology ==
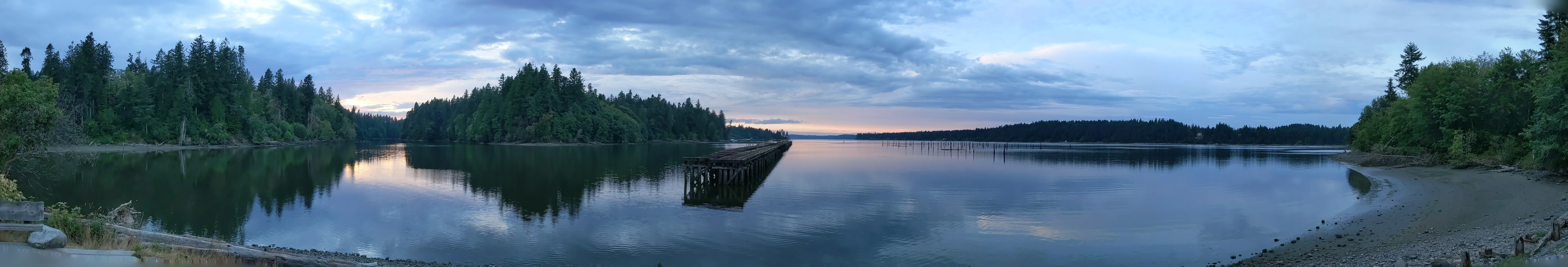
Woodard Bay Natural Resources Conservation Area, looking north into Henderson Inlet and Chapman Bay, 2019

Woodard Bay was one of four original conservation areas statewide to be part of a natural conservation area program initiated under the Washington Department of Natural Resources (WADOE) after a 1987 approval by the Washington State Legislature. In 2013, a restoration effort was completed that removed 2,140 tonnes (2,110 long tons; 2,360 short tons) of creosote-tainted materials, over 1,200 pilings from the inlet, and the mitigation of 12,000 cubic yards (9,200 m^{3}) of fill.

The site features a maturing second-growth forest edging 5 miles (8.0 km) of shoreline at Woodard and Chapman bays on Henderson Inlet. Wetlands, tidelands, and several streams are also located in the protected area.

A marine conservation effort began at Woodard Bay when The Nature Conservancy signed a 10-year lease with the WADOE to restore 10 acres (40,000 m^{2}) of subtidal land in Henderson Inlet near the mouth of Woodard Bay to bring back the once-abundant Olympia oyster. The lease is the first of its kind in the country.

=== Wildlife ===
The shallow, saltwater bays are largely undeveloped and has attracted wildlife not usually seen so close to an urban area. A colony of bats, possibly the largest in South Puget Sound, inhabits the underside of a railroad pier closed to the public. In 2008, a zoologist with the Washington State Department of Natural Resources theorized that the population of bats around Woodard Bay "may have been similar" to the numbers of bats at the pier in the present day. The roosting at one location is most likely not comparable to the historical nesting of bats throughout the region. Bat species include little brown and Yuma myotis bats and as of 2015, the colonies were recorded to have a population of approximately 3,000.

A harbor seal colony, considered in 2008 to be the largest in the South Sound, rest on old log booms outside of Chapman Bay. Other aquatic mammals include river otters.

Birds such as pigeon guillemots and cormorants, as well as a purple martin colony, roost in the area. Chapman Bay is closed to boaters, to protect nesting eagles and a heron rookery, which was moved to Woodard Bay in 2004. Woodard Bay is closed during the late summer to early spring to protect wintering waterfowl. (Note: The closure of the conservation area, or its trail system, has changed several times but usually spans the timeframe mentioned. See sources throughout the article for the discrepancies.) The Woodard Bay conservation area is home to a large heron colony and visitors can spot bald eagles, a diverse array of songbirds, and several types of aquatic animals such as otters and seals.

== Facilities and features ==
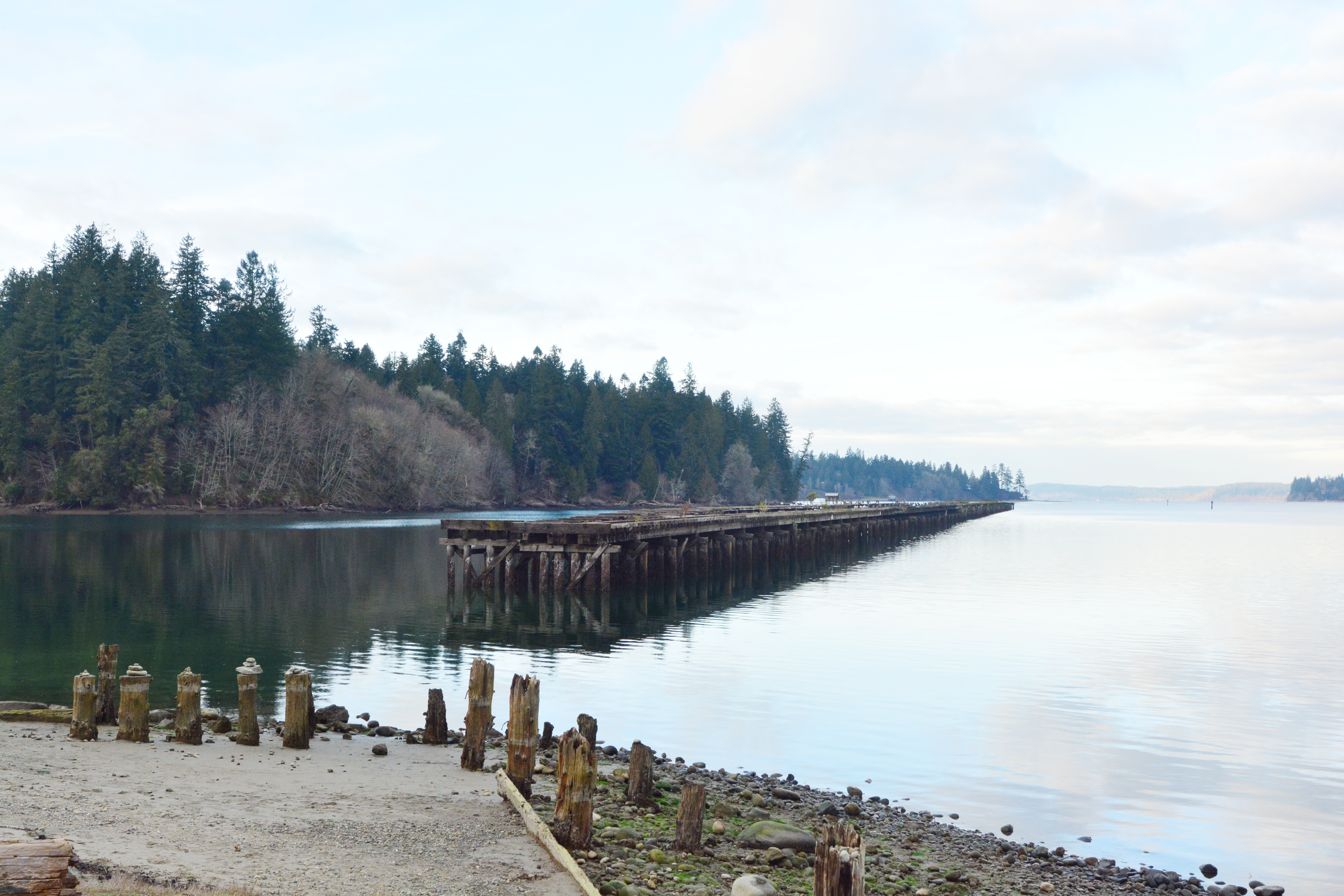
Old Weyerhaueser pier, 2021

Facilities include group meeting areas for small school groups, picnic tables, benches, and a toilet. A camp car, once used as a cookhouse and later an office, was refurbished to represent its former uses; much of the work was done by the Washington Conservation Corps as well as with prison labor by inmates from the Cedar Creek Correctional Center.

The Weyer Point environmental education facility, built at a cost of $1,500,000 (equivalent to $2,037,414 in 2025) and designed in industrial architecture style to mimic the logging history of the grounds, features interpretive panels in an open shelter area. A "skid shack", once an office for a boom foreman, was converted for use as a small museum. Landscaping includes a rain garden and a meadow containing native plants such as camas, lupine and yarrow. Benches and other wood features were constructed using trees that were cut down during the construction. Replica dugout canoes, as a well a canoe meant for the open waters, are designed in the practice of the Nisqaully and Squaxin people. Embedded in some of the sidewalks are original rail tracks.

The site is near the northernmost trailhead of the Chehalis Western Trail. As bicycle riding is prohibited in Woodard Bay NRCAA, a sheltered bike rack is provided for bicyclists. The trailhead is closed in some years to protect nesting herons at the conservation area. Three trails, spanning a total of 2.5 miles (4.0 km), are located inside the area. The Overlook Trail leads to views of Woodard Bay and a loop trail is situated in a forested section. The trails are closed during the nesting season of bald eagles, Great blue herons, and double-crested cormorants.

A canoe launch allows kayakers access to the bay and inlet. Similar to the trails in the protected area, the launch is closed during nesting seasons. Additional limitations to protect the various colonies of aquatic mammals, bats, and birds include a prohibition on all pets.

== See also ==
- History of Olympia, Washington
- List of geographic features in Thurston County, Washington
- List of parks and recreation in Thurston County, Washington
- List of Washington Natural Resources Conservation Areas
- National Register of Historic Places listings in Thurston County, Washington
- Parks and recreation in Olympia, Washington
