= Dofflemyer Point Light =

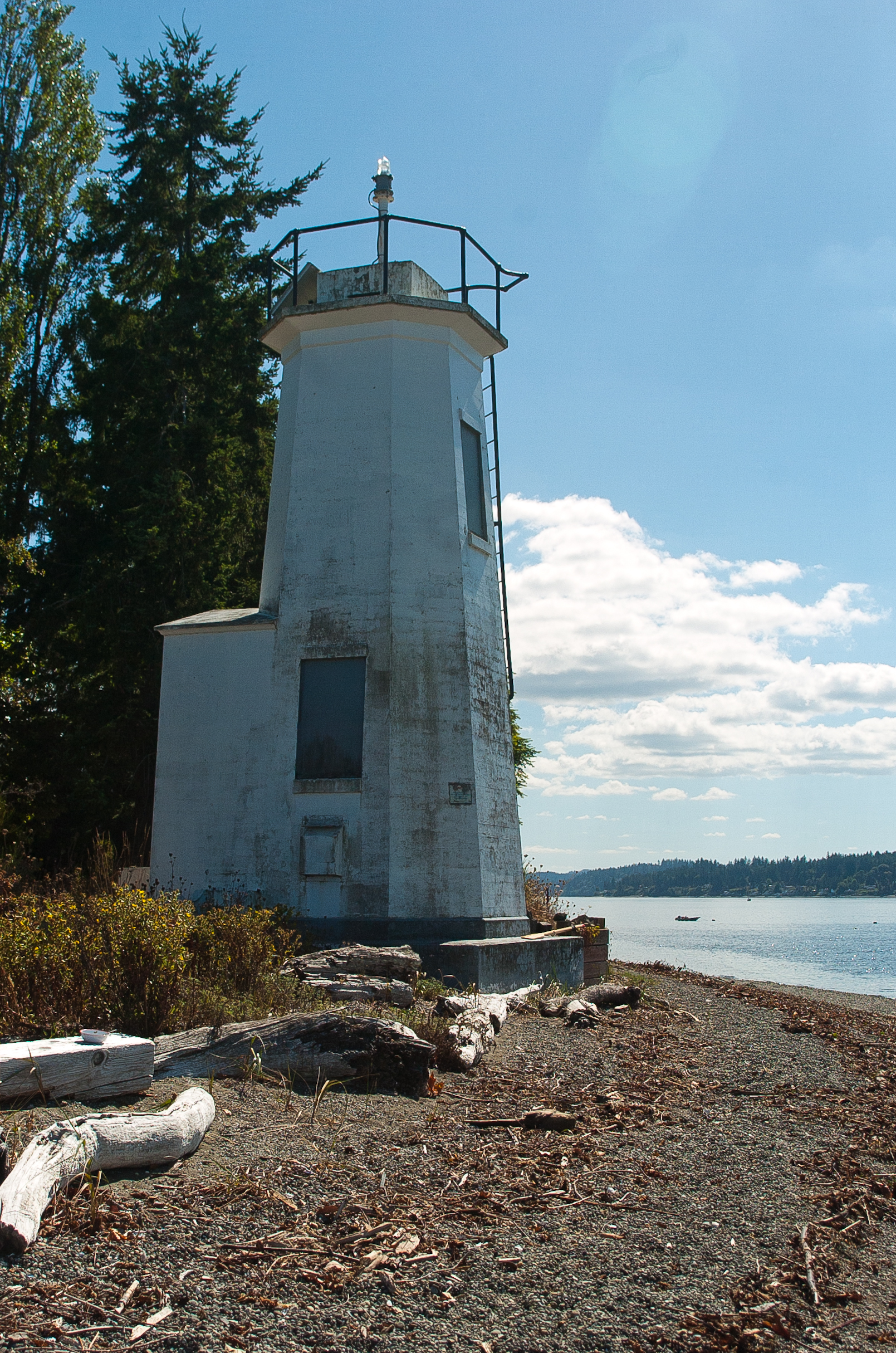
- Dofflemyer Point Lighthouse, ca. 2012
- Location: Budd Inlet, Washington
- Coordinates: 47°08′25.8602″N 122°54′26.2384″W

Tower
- Constructed: 1934
- Foundation: Surface
- Construction: Concrete
- Automated: 1987
- Height: 30 feet (9.1 m)
- Shape: Pyramidal
- Heritage: National Register of Historic Places listed place

Light
- First lit: 1934
- Focal height: 9 m (30 ft)
- Range: 7 nmi (13 km; 8.1 mi)
- Characteristic: Fl W 6s
- Dofflemyer Point Lighthouse
- U.S. National Register of Historic Places
- Architect: Rufus Kindle
- MPS: Maritime Related Resources of Budd Inlet MPS
- NRHP reference No.: 93001339
- Added to NRHP: May 1, 1995

The Dofflemyer Point Lighthouse is a U.S. lighthouse in Boston Harbor, Washington, and was one of the first in the state of Washington to be automated. It sits at the northeastern entrance to Budd Inlet north of Olympia. It is the southernmost light in Puget Sound and is listed on the National Register of Historic Places.

== History ==
Dofflemeyer Point defines the eastern side of the entrance to Budd Inlet, which leads south to Olympia, the state capital. Dofflemyer Point was named after Isaac Dofflemyer, a pioneer settler. A lens lantern atop a twelve-foot stake was established at the Point in 1887. As of 2023, the present day 30-foot (9.1 m), pyramidal concrete tower, designed by architect Rufus Kindle, replaced the first light in 1934. In the 1960s, the Coast Guard automated the Dofflemyer Point Lighthouse, using photoelectric cells to turn the light on and off. However, a contract keeper was still required to maintain the light and tower, and to activate the fog signal when needed. The lighthouse was fully automated in 1987 and a radio-beacon, which transmitted a radio signal used in locating a mariner's position, was installed.

On May 1, 1995, the Dofflemyer Point Lighthouse was officially designated by the Washington State Advisory Council on Historic Preservation as an historic place and listed on the Washington Heritage Register. The lighthouse sits on private property and is not open to the public.

== See also ==
- History of Olympia, Washington
