= Boston Harbor (disambiguation) =

The name Boston Harbor may refer to:

- Boston Harbor, a natural harbor located adjacent to the city of Boston, Massachusetts
- Boston Harbor (horse), an American thoroughbred racehorse
- Boston Harbor, Washington, an unincorporated community in Thurston County, Washington
