= Cooper Point =

Cooper Point may refer to:

- Cooper Point, Camden, a neighborhood in New Jersey
- Cooper Point (Thurston County, Washington), a cape in the state of Washington
