= List of Washington Natural Resources Conservation Areas =

This is a list of Natural Resources Conservation Areas (NRCAs), part of the Washington Natural Areas Program managed by Washington Department of Natural Resources.

Clallam County

- Shipwreck Point NRCA: This site includes one of the last, easily accessible, open stretches of beach on the Strait of Juan de Fuca. 472 acres (1.91 km^{2})

Clark County

- Lacamas Prairie Natural Area: This combined natural area preserve (NAP) and natural resources conservation area (NRCA) protects the best known remnant of the Willamette Valley wet prairie ecosystem in Washington. 189 acres (0.76 km^{2})
- Washougal Oaks Natural Area: This combined NAP/NRCA: protects the largest high-quality Oregon white oak woodland in western Washington. 264 acres (1.07 km^{2})

Cowlitz County

- Merrill Lake NRCA: This site contains a mixed conifer/hardwood forest along a shoreline, providing habitat for birds of prey. 114 acres (0.46 km^{2})

Grays Harbor County

- Elk River NRCA: This area is the largest, highest quality estuarine system remaining in Washington or Oregon. 5,413 acres (21.91 km^{2})

Jefferson County

- Clearwater Corridor NRCA: This site represents a mature coastal forest, protects aquatic-riparian habitat and provides elk habitat. 2,323 acres (9.40 km^{2})
- Devils Lake NRCA: This NRCA: contains two freshwater wetlands and two sphagnum bog communities. 80 acres (0.32 km^{2})
- South Nolan NRCA: This area is an old-growth temperate forest with scattered wetlands. Some trees are more than 500 years old. 213 acres (0.86 km^{2})

King County

- Middle Fork Snoqualmie NRCA: This area protects old growth Douglas-fir forest, subalpine lands, mid-elevation lakes, and habitat for marbled murrelet, northern spotted owl and native mountain goat. 10,828 acres (43.82 km^{2})
- Rattlesnake Mountain Scenic Area: This area protects cliff terrain, wildlife habitat, numerous riparian systems and old growth forest. 1,771 acres (7.17 km^{2})
- Mount Si NRCA: This NRCA: supports a variety of wildlife including native mountain goats, cougar and black bear. 20,753 acres (83.98 km^{2})
- West Tiger Mountain NRCA: This NRCA: provides important habitat for large and small wildlife including reptiles and amphibians. 4,430 acres (17.9 km^{2})

Kitsap County

- Stavis NRCA: This natural area includes the best known quality example of the Douglas-fir–western hemlock/evergreen huckleberry forest community, and one of the only extensive mature and old growth forests in the Puget Sound lowlands. 5,209 acres (21.08 km^{2})

Klickitat County

- Klickitat Canyon NRCA: This NRCA has views of the Klickitat River, and is home to a variety of wildlife species. 1,516 acres (6.14 km^{2})
- White Salmon Oak NRCA: This site represents of all of the Oregon white oak communities found in the White Salmon River drainage. 551 acres (2.23 km^{2})

Lewis County

- Tahoma Forest NRCA: This site protects the ecological value of a structurally complex old growth forest. 230 acres (0.93 km^{2})

Okanogan County

- Loomis NRCA: This NRCA: protects twelve plant species of concern, as well as important habitat for nine wildlife species. 24,672 acres (99.84 km^{2})

Pacific County

- Ellsworth Creek NRCA: This preserve provides important breeding habitat for the federally threatened marbled murrelet. 557 acres (2.25 km^{2})
- South Nemah NRCA: This site contains western red cedar and Sitka spruce and habitat for marbled murrelets and spotted owls. 2,440 acres (9.9 km^{2})
- Teal Slough NRCA: This site supports a remnant coastal old growth forest and is home to marbled murrelets and spotted owls.
- Naselle Highlands NRCA: This site contains mature conifer forest habitat including platform trees that support marbled murrelet nesting sites.

Pierce County

- Ashford NRCA: This site protects mature, structurally complex conifer forest and helps provide habitat for northern spotted owls. 78 acres (0.32 km^{2})

San Juan County

- Cattle Point NRCA: This NRCA: is an important research site with a day use recreation and interpretive area. 112 acres (450,000 m^{2}).

Skagit County

- Cypress Island NRCA: This is the last largely undeveloped island in the San Juans, providing a reminder of pre-settlement Washington. 4,000 acres (16 km^{2})
- Granite Lakes NRCA: This area contains 160-year old stands of silver fir, mountain hemlock and associated plant communities. 603 acres (2.44 km^{2})
- Hat Island NRCA: This conservation area provides habitat for bald eagles, sea and shore birds. 91 acres (370,000 m^{2})

Skamania County

- Table Mountain NRCA: This area contains relatively undisturbed upland and wetland forests, mountain meadows, and rare plants. 2,837 acres (11.48 km^{2})
- Stevenson Ridge NRCA: This area includes structurally complex, old-growth conifer forest that serves as nesting habitat for the northern spotted owl, federally listed as "endangered."

Snohomish County

- Morning Star NRCA: This NRCA: features low to high elevation terrain; meadows, forests, and exposed rocks and cliffs. 36,037 acres (145.84 km^{2}).

Spokane County

- Dishman Hills NRCA: This site is notable for dramatically sculpted terrain left by the floods which issued from Glacial Lake Missoula. 518 acres (2.10 km^{2})

Thurston County

- Woodard Bay Natural Resources Conservation Area: The 922-acre (373 ha) site protects habitat ranging from shoreline to wetlands to mature second-growth forest.

Wahkiakum County

- Hendrickson Canyon NRCA: This site contains the county's last high quality, mature and old growth western hemlock forest. 159 acres (0.64 km^{2})
- Skamokawa Creek NRCA: This site contains mature conifer forest habitat including platform trees supporting marbled murrelet nesting sites.

Whatcom County

- Lake Louise NRCA: This site includes a very large, active beaver pond and various forest communities. 138 acres (0.56 km^{2})
- Lummi Island NRCA: This site provides an uneven-aged mixed forest, making it very appealing to birds of prey. 661 acres (2.67 km^{2})

Yakima County

- Klickitat Canyon NRCA: This NRCA has views of the Klickitat River, and is home to a variety of wildlife species. 1,516 acres (6.14 km^{2})

Source: Natural Resources Conservation Areas, Washington Department of Natural Resources, 2018
