= Woodruff Park (Olympia) =

Public park in Olympia, Washington

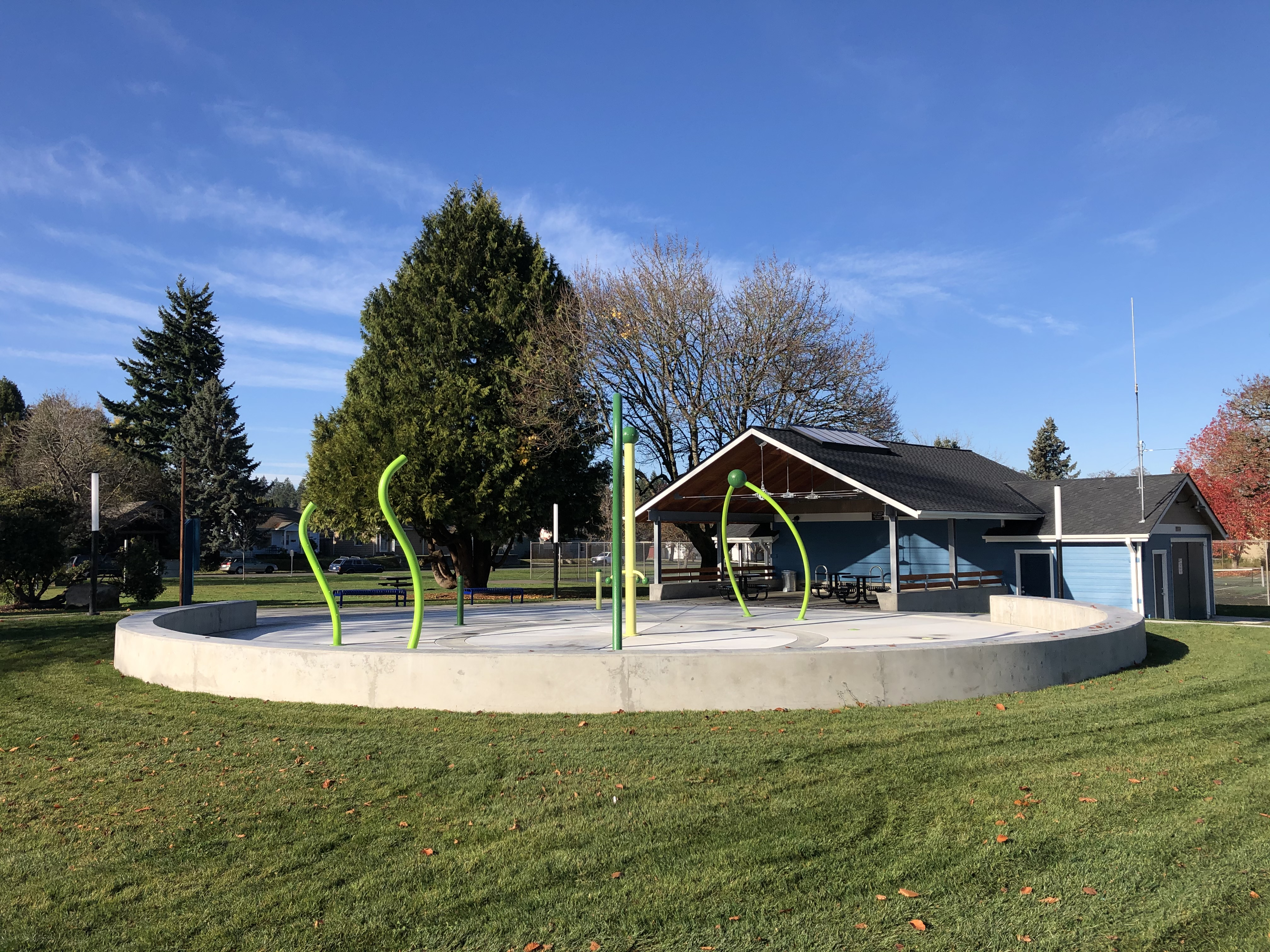
- Sprayground at Woodruff Park
- Interactive map of Park location
- Type: Public park, Urban park
- Location: 1500 Harrison Ave NW, Olympia, Washington
- Coordinates: 47°02′47″N 122°55′14″W
- Area: 2.46 acres (0.0100 km^{2})
- Created: 1892
- Etymology: Samuel C. Woodruff, Jr., developer
- Owner: City of Olympia
- Status: Open
- Paths: Walking path
- Terrain: Open space
- Water: Sprayground
- Parking: Parking lot
- Facilities: Bathrooms, picnic shelters, athletic courts

Woodruff Park is an 2.46-acre (1.00 ha) urban park located in and administered by the city of Olympia, Washington.

== History ==
Woodruff Park was named after Samuel C. Woodruff, Jr., an early developer in Olympia who donated the property to the city in 1892 for just $1. The park sits at the crest of Olympia's westside hill, between the arterial Harrison Avenue and Garfield Elementary School.

== Features ==
Amenities include a picnic shelter, restrooms, and courts for basketball, tennis and pickleball, and volleyball. The park also contains a sprayground, the first such in the city.

== See also ==
- History of Olympia, Washington
- Parks and recreation in Olympia, Washington
