= Grass Lake Nature Park =

Nature reserve in Olympia, Washington, US

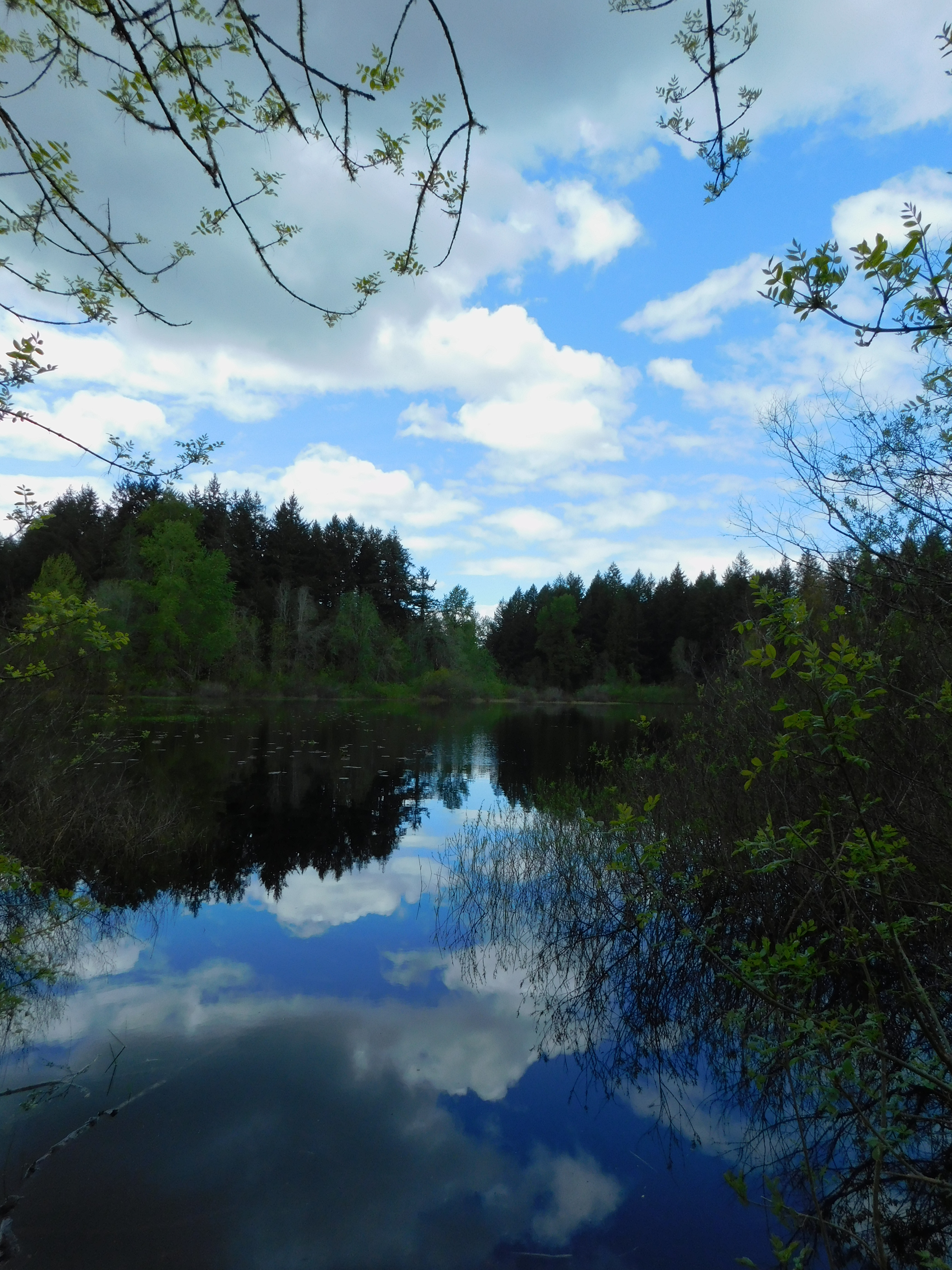
- Grass Lake Nature Park, 2022
- Interactive map of Park location
- Type: Nature reserve
- Location: 814 Kaiser Rd NW, Olympia, Washington
- Coordinates: 47°03′13″N 122°56′59″W
- Area: 195.71 acres (79.20 ha)
- Created: 1980s; master plan in 1998
- Etymology: Swamp grass around lakes
- Owner: City of Olympia
- Status: Open
- Hiking trails: 1.3 miles (2.1 km)
- Habitats: Forest, wetland
- Water: Creek, ponds or lakes
- Plants: Swamp grass
- Species: Various bird species
- Collections: Public art
- Parking: Parking lot
- GNIS feature ID: 1504863
- Facilities: Picnic area

Grass Lake Nature Park is a 195-acre (79 ha) nature reserve in Olympia, Washington. Owned by the city since the 1980s, it is the second largest park in the city.

The preserve is named after swamp grass that grows in the wetland areas of the park. Home to three lakes, or ponds, the site underwent an improvement project between 2024 and 2025 that included the expansion of a multi-use trail system and the installation of public art sculptures.

== History ==
The lake and surrounding wetland has been owned by the City of Olympia since the 1980s and a master plan developed for the site by 1998. The park was previously known as Grass Lake Refuge and renamed to its current moniker around 2010. The preserve was expanded by approximately 8 acres (3.2 ha) in 2007 after the Olympia Parks, Arts & Recreation Department purchased a northwest corner parcel for $346,000. The expansion gave the city almost complete ownership of the shoreline of one of the ponds in the preserve, Lake Louise.

The park underwent a $2.8 million infrastructure improvement project that began in August 2024 and was completed in June 2025. The efforts improved access to the site, parking, and provided additional hiking amenities as well as an overhaul of the existing pathways. Public art sculptures and new signage were also included in the project. An expansion of the picnic area led to an additional 0.5 acres (0.20 ha) to the wetland area.

In 2026, Grass Lake Nature Park received the Trail Award from the Washington State Recreation and Park Association.

== Geography ==
The nature reserve is located in Olympia, Washington. The park has an area of 195.71 acres (79.20 ha) and as of 2025 is considered the second largest park in Olympia.

== Ecology and environment ==
A natural wetland area surrounds Green Cove Creek which passes through the preserve. During the winter season, waters can rise as high as 5 feet (1.5 m). The pond system drains into the creek which leads to Eld Inlet. Over 100 species of birds have been recorded at the park.

== Features ==
The central feature of the park is a reservoir created in 1966 known as Grass Lake, two bodies of water separately titled as Grass Lake East and Grass Lake West. Swamp grass in the lake accounts for the name. A third pond in the preserve is known as Louise Lake.

Amenities include a 1.3-mile (2.1 km) hiking trail which was expanded in 2025 to include an additional 1.1-mile (1.8 km) paved path and a 365 foot (111 metres) boardwalk. The overhaul of the park's trails during the 2024-2025 project converted the existing pathway to be part of a larger commuter trail system in Olympia known as the Capitol to Capitol (CTC) trail. The system allows easier access throughout the neighborhood and provides connections to other trails leading to downtown Olympia and Capitol Forest. Grass Lake was the first off-street portion to be created for the CTC.

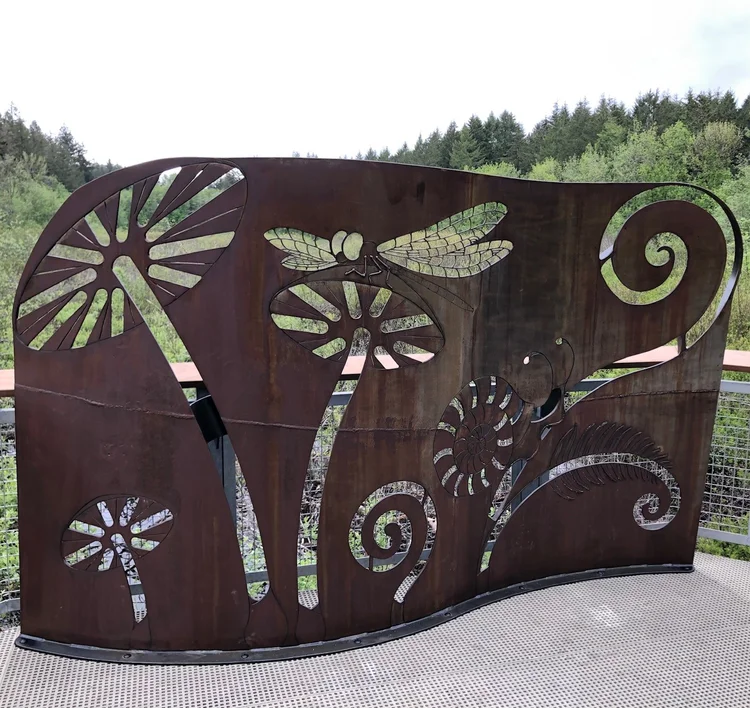
The metal bird blind in Grass Lake Nature Park, made by sculptor Abe Singer.

Two sculptures in the shapes of mushrooms mark the trailheads, along with a metal bird blind on the boardwalk; the artworks were created by sculptor Abe Singer during the 2024-2025 revamp efforts from an existing, unused water tank that was situated on the grounds.

== See also ==
- History of Olympia, Washington
- List of geographic features in Thurston County, Washington
- Parks and recreation in Olympia, Washington
