= Chapman Bay =

Bay in Puget Sound, Washington state

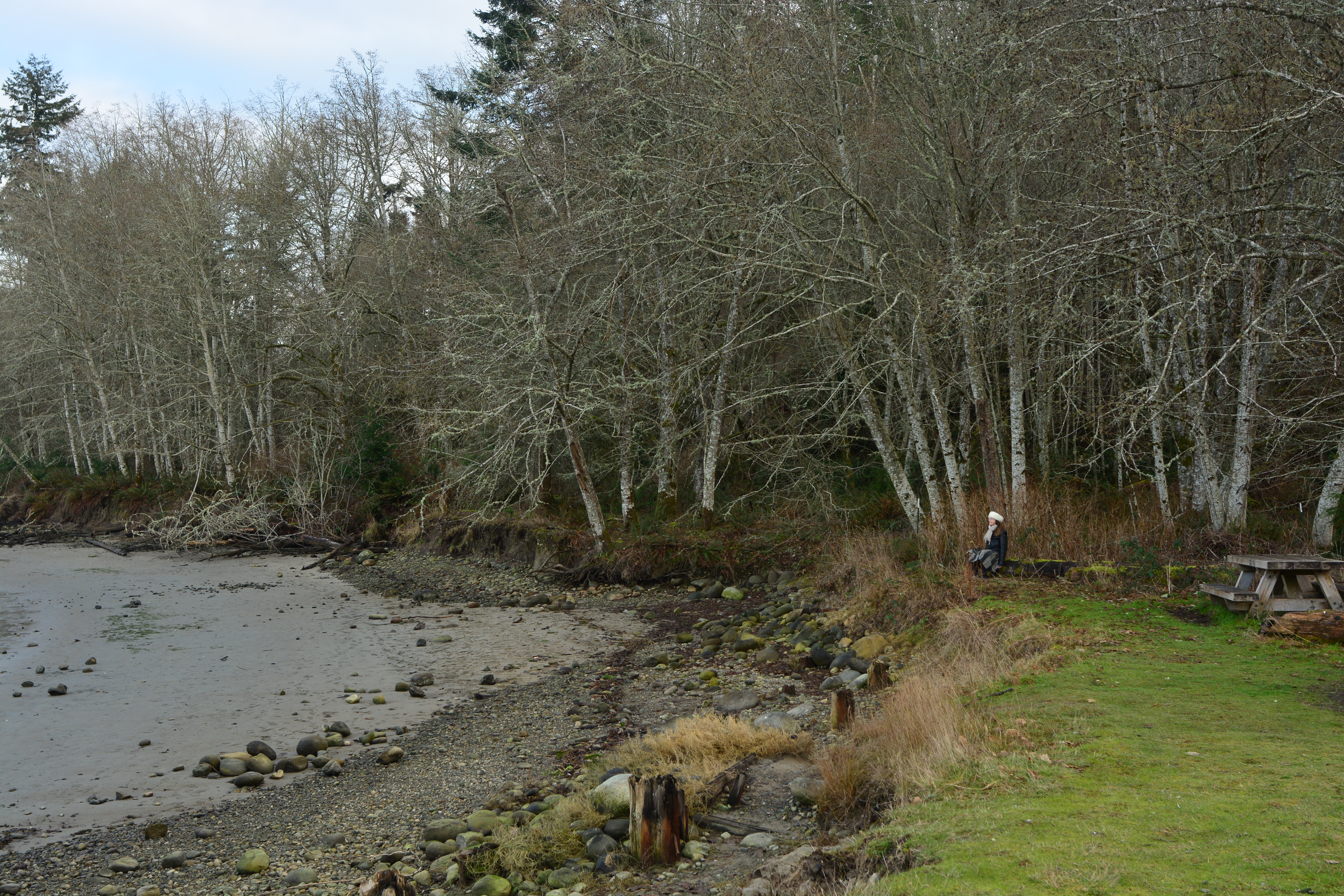
- Shore of Chapman Bay, 2021

- Location within Washington (state)
- Location: Thurston County, Washington
- Coordinates: 47°08′09″N 122°50′46″W
- Type: Bay
- Primary inflows: Libby Creek
- Primary outflows: Henderson Inlet

Chapman Bay is a small inlet of Henderson Inlet, which drains into Puget Sound in Washington. It is located in Thurston County and the nearest city is Olympia, the state capital.

== See also ==
- List of geographic features in Thurston County, Washington
