= Squaxin Park =

Public park in Olympia, Washington

- Priest Point Park
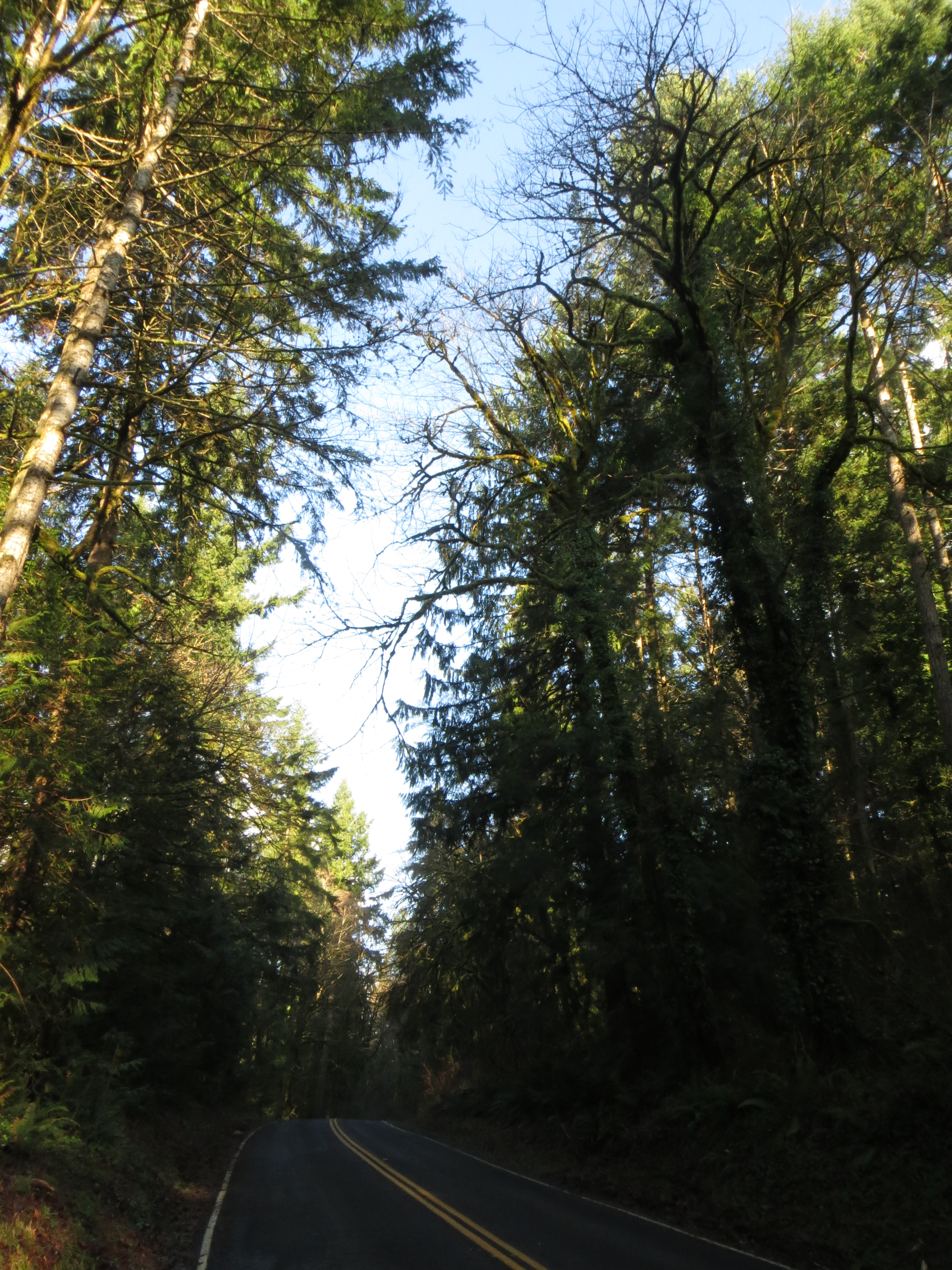
- Squaxin Park, 2013
- Interactive map of Park location
- Type: Municipal
- Location: 2600 East Bay Dr NE, Olympia, Washington
- Coordinates: 47°04′12″N 122°53′39″W
- Area: 314 acres (1.27 km^{2})
- Created: 1905
- Etymology: Squaxin Island Tribe
- Owner: City of Olympia
- Status: Open
- Hiking trails: Nature trails
- Habitats: Waterfront, forest
- Water: Budd Inlet; Ellis Cove
- Plants: Rose garden
- Species: Various bird species
- Parking: Parking lot
- Facilities: Picnic and playground areas, bathrooms, athletic courts
- Website: Official City Website

Squaxin Park is a public park located in Olympia, Washington. Established in 1905, it was the city's first waterfront park, providing access to the Budd Inlet of Puget Sound. The park was formerly known as Priest Point Park, but was renamed in 2022 after the Olympia City Council unanimously voted to change it to honor the local Squaxin Island Tribe.

== History ==
Squaxin Park is the site of a former American Indian encampment.

In 1848, Catholic missionaries of the Oblates of Mary Immaculate led by Father Pascal Ricard arrived in the South Puget Sound area, claiming the site as St. Joseph's of New Market. Father Ricard and three other French Canadian priests built two or three simple buildings, including a classroom and chapel, along with an orchard and garden. They operated a school for Indian boys from the local Squaxin Island Tribe. The Nisqually, Puyallup and Snoqualmie used the mission as a trading post. The mission closed in 1860, three years after Pascal left.

After plans for a housing development fell through, in 1905 the land became a city park known as Priest Point Park and was the first waterfront recreation site in Olympia. Volunteers labored to clear trails, install landscaping and re-erect the elaborate two-story Swiss-style chalet donated by Leopold Schmidt of the Olympia Brewery. The building first served as the brewery's pavilion at the 1903-04 Lewis and Clark Exposition in Portland, Oregon, and remained at the park until the early 1950s.

The site was renamed in 2022 to Squaxin Park, in honor of the Squaxin Island Tribe. The Olympia City Council unanimously voted to change the moniker.

== Features ==
Today the park includes picnic shelters, nature trails, a large playground, basketball courts and public restrooms, as well as a mile of saltwater shoreline along the Budd Inlet of the Puget Sound. Ellis Cove juts into the park, and features a trail lining its perimeter. There is also a formal rose garden.

Birding at the park offers a variety of species, including the northern flicker, downy and pileated woodpeckers, red-breasted nuthatch, and brown creeper. osprey nest north of Ellis Cove, and the mudflats and rocky beach host greater yellowlegs, western and least sandpipers, and dunlin. Bald eagles and pigeon guillemot are frequently in the park as well.

== See also ==
- History of Olympia, Washington
- Parks and recreation in Olympia, Washington
