= Libby Creek (Washington) =

Creek in Thurston County, Washington state

- Location of the mouth of Libby Creek in Washington Libby Creek (Washington) (the United States)
- Etymology: George A. Libby

Location
- Country: United States
- State: Washington
- County: Thurston

Physical characteristics
- Source
  - coordinates: 47°07′51″N 122°52′14″W
- Mouth: Chapman Bay
  - location: Thurston County, Washington
  - coordinates: 47°08′19″N 122°51′23″W
  - elevation: 7–2 ft (2.13–0.61 m)
- Length: 1.4 mi (2.3 km)

Basin features
- Geographic Names Information System: 2791111

Libby Creek is a creek in northern Thurston County, Washington. Libby Creek flows into Chapman Bay and Henderson Inlet. The name honors the Libby family, specifically George A. Libby (1833–1898), who homesteaded at the North end of the trail that is now Libby Road.

== See also ==
- List of geographic features in Thurston County, Washington
