= Burfoot Park =

Public park in Thurston County, Washington

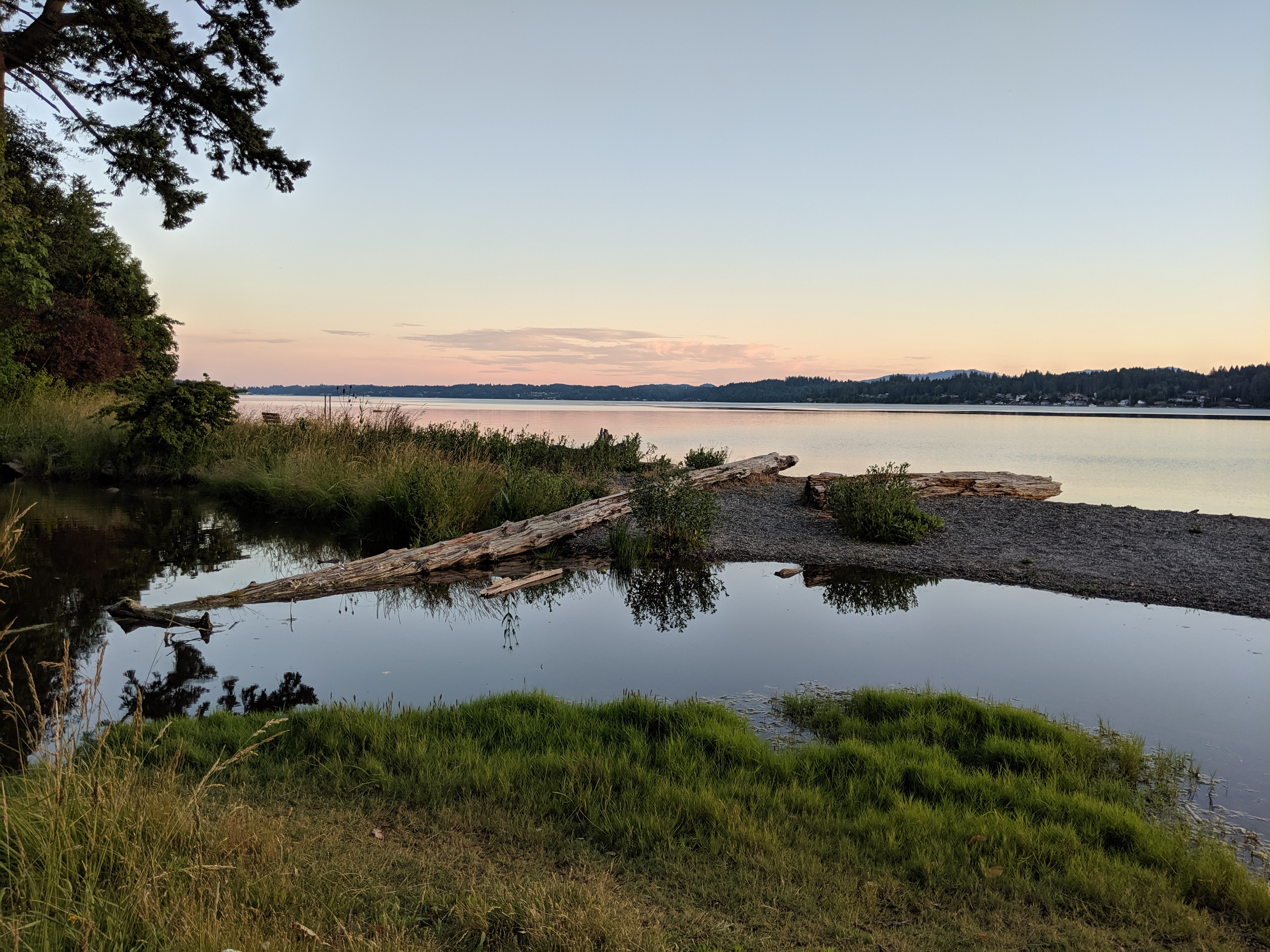
- Budd Inlet from Burfoot Park
- Interactive map of Park location
- Type: County
- Location: 6927 Boston Harbor Road NE, Olympia, Thurston County, Washington
- Coordinates: 47°07′57″N 122°54′00″W
- Area: 65 acres (0.26 km^{2})
- Etymology: Burfoot family
- Administrator: Thurston County Public Works Department
- Open: Open daily 9 a.m. to dusk
- Hiking trails: 3.8 miles (6.1 km)
- Habitats: Tidal, forest
- Water: Budd Inlet
- Plants: Rhododendrons
- Species: Various aquatic and bird species
- Parking: Parking lot
- Website: Thurston County Public Works Department - Burfoot Park
- Facilities: Bathrooms, picnic shelters

Burfoot Park is a public park located in, and under the oversight of, Thurston County, Washington. The recreation site sits on Budd Inlet near Olympia, Washington.

== History ==
The park is named after the Burfoot family who once owned the land. The park is under management of the Thurston County Public Works Department..

An artificial reef made of tires that was located off the shores of Burfoot Park was begun to be removed in 2025. Containing approximately 17,000 tires, the attempted reef was part of an overall effort within the Puget Sound during the 1970s and 1980s to increase aquatic wildlife in the waters as a means to strengthen recreational fishing. The tires spread after polypropylene twine holding the tire bundles in place dissolved, becoming a damaging, negative environmental impact.

== Geography ==
The forested site is located on a peninsula overlooking Budd Inlet, north of Olympia. Burfoot Park covers 65 acres (260,000 m^{2}) of property with 1,100 feet (340 m) of saltwater beach frontage on the Puget Sound waterway.

== Features and recreation ==
The recreation area features picnic shelters, a small playground, and public restrooms. There are a total of 3.8 miles (6.1 km) of hiking trails. A few of the pathways are boardwalks.

== Environment and ecology ==
Wildlife viewing in the park and Budd Inlet includes cutthroat trout, gray whales, orcas, salmon, sea lions, and various tidal creatures. Tidepools include such species as crabs, shrimp, and starfish. The pools are also home to aquatic worms, geoducks, and moon snails.

Rare aquatic mammal sightings in the waters off Burfoot Park include two Bryde's whales and a bottlenose dolphin in 2010; the cetaceans were later found dead on the shores in the South Sound. In 2011, a long-beaked common dolphin, or potentially a pair, were spotted in the inlet off the shoreline of the park. The sighting was the first known of the non-native species in Puget Sound.

Rhododendrons are located in large numbers throughout the park. Burfoot also contains several pockets of poison oak. Trails in the park meander through forest containing cedar, Douglas fir, and maple.

Deer are often seen in large numbers. Birds that can be spotted in Burfoot Park include ducks such as bufflehead and goldeneye, as well as mergansers.

== See also ==
- History of Olympia, Washington
- List of parks and recreation in Thurston County, Washington
- Parks and recreation in Olympia, Washington
