= Cooper Point (Thurston County, Washington) =

Peninsula in Puget Sound, Washington state

Cooper Point Point Cooper
- Point, peninsula
- Location within Washington (state)
- Coordinates: 47°08′48″N 122°55′34″W
- Location: Thurston County, Washington
- Water bodies: Budd Inlet
- Etymology: John Cooper
- GNIS feature ID: 1504134

Cooper Point is a peninsula located in Thurston County in the U.S. state of Washington, located 6.8 mi (11.0 km) northwest of the state capital and county seat, Olympia. It borders South Puget Sound.

Cooper Point was named after John Cooper, an armorer in the United States Exploring Expedition, which explored the area in the early 1840s. It was originally known as "Point Cooper".

The namesake road which leads from Olympia to the peninsula, Cooper Point Road, begins at its namesake exit on U.S. Route 101, located near the border of Olympia and Tumwater, Washington. It continues to the north on a winding path past Capital Mall, The Evergreen State College, and the Olympia Golf & Country Club, before terminating at Cooper Point.

Cooper Point is located less than one mile away, but on a separate peninsula, from Boston Harbor, Washington, as the crow flies. The two peninsulas form the entrance to Budd Inlet, which eventually leads to downtown Olympia.

== See also ==
- List of geographic features in Thurston County, Washington
- List of peninsulas
