= Tolmie State Park =

State park in Washington (state), United States

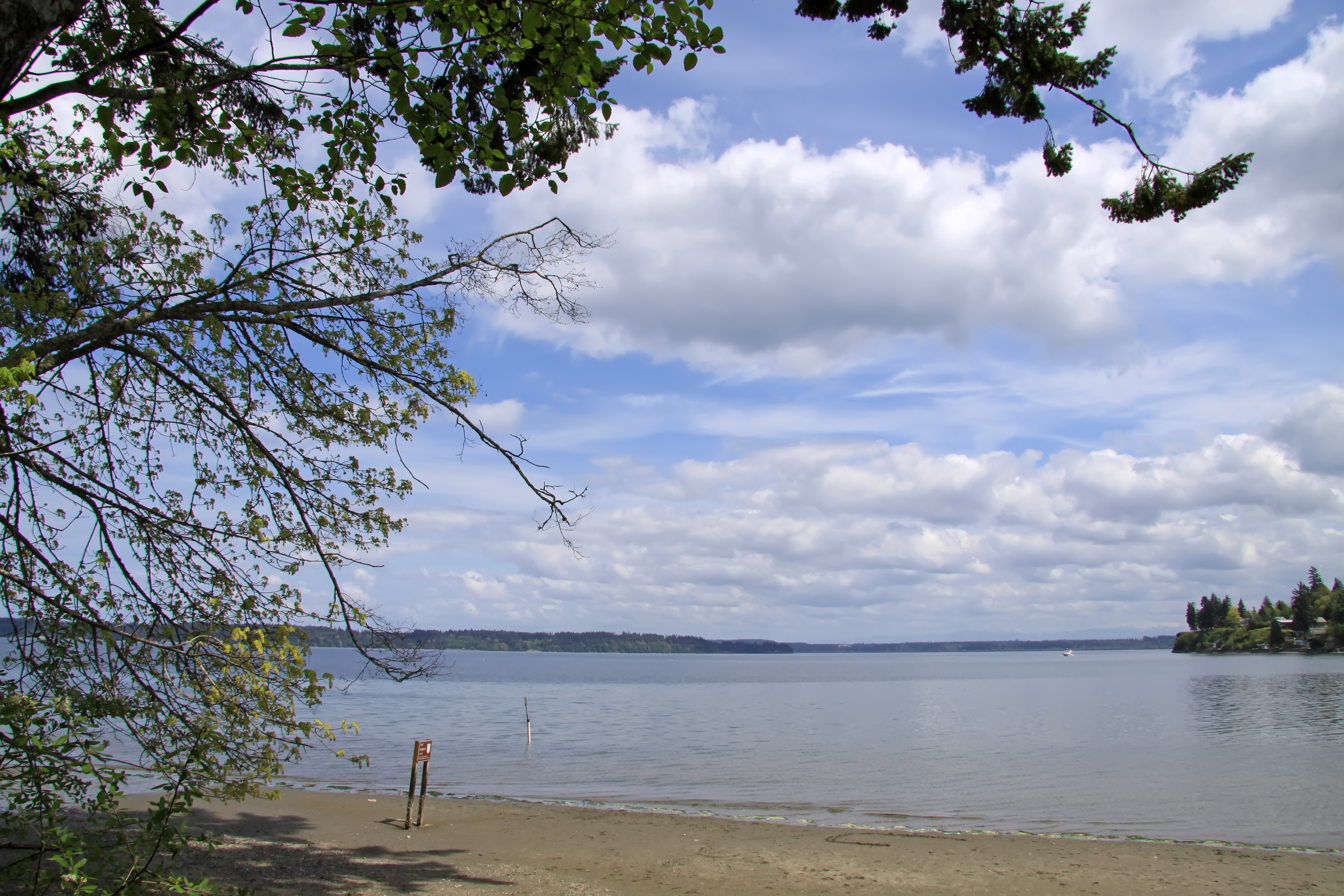

- Location within Washington (state) Location within the United States
- Location: Thurston County, Washington, United States
- Coordinates: 47°07′15″N 122°46′36″W
- Area: 154 acres (62 ha)
- Elevation: 3 ft (0.91 m)
- Established: 1965
- Administrator: Washington State Parks and Recreation Commission
- Visitors: 191,251 (in 2024)
- Website: Official website

Tolmie State Park is a public recreation area and state park covering 154 acres (62 ha) on Nisqually Beach on Puget Sound, eight miles (13 km) northeast of Olympia, Washington.

== History ==
The park was named after William Fraser Tolmie, a Hudson's Bay Company officer. The state acquired land for the state park from Charles and Ola Jones in 1965.

Removal of more than 100,000 tires comprising an artificial reef off the shores of Tolmie State Park and the Nisqually River delta began in late 2024. The attempted reef was part of an overall effort within the Puget Sound during the 1970s and 1980s to increase aquatic wildlife in the waters as a means to strengthen recreational fishing. The tires spread after polypropylene twine holding the tire bundles in place dissolved, becoming a damaging, negative environmental impact.

== Geography and features ==
Tolmie State Park includes 1,800 ft (550 m) of saltwater shoreline at the mouth of a creek known as Big Slough as well as forest lands, a saltwater marsh, and an underwater park with artificial reef for scuba diving.

== Activities and amenities ==
Park activities include hiking on three miles of trails, boating, swimming, scuba diving, fishing, crabbing, and bird watching.

== See also ==
- List of geographic features in Thurston County, Washington
- List of parks and recreation in Thurston County, Washington
