= Ellis Cove =

Bay in Puget Sound, Washington state

Coordinates: 47°04′12″N 122°54′00″W

Ellis Cove is a bay in the U.S. state of Washington.

Ellis Cove has the name of Isaac "Ike" Ellis, a local lumberman.

== See also ==
- List of geographic features in Thurston County, Washington
