= Boston Harbor, Washington =

Unincorporated community in Washington, United States

Boston Harbor
- Unincorporated community
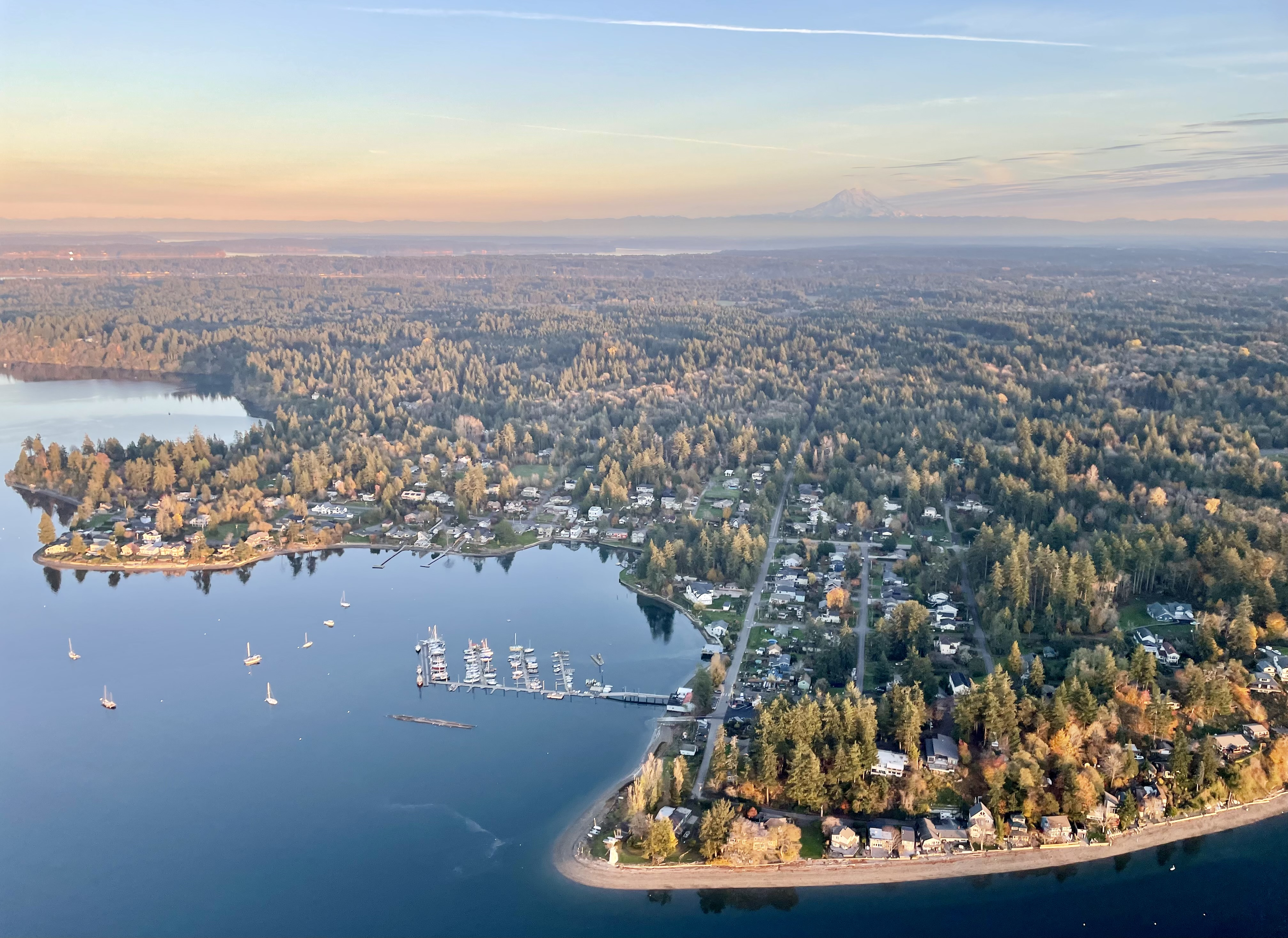
- Boston Harbor

- Location within Washington (state) Location within the United States
- Coordinates: 47°8′19.22″N 122°54′4.24″W
- Country: United States
- State: Washington
- County: Thurston
- Elevation: 19 ft (5.8 m)
- Time zone: UTC-8 (Pacific (PST))
  - Summer (DST): UTC-7 (Pacific (PDT))
- ZIP code: 98506
- Area code: 360

Boston Harbor is an unincorporated community in Thurston County, Washington. The community is home to the Dofflemyer Point Light, built in 1934 and listed on the National Register of Historic Places in 1995.

== History ==
Seattle real estate developer C. D. Hillman platted the site in 1907 and promoted sale of lots by offering cash prizes to buyers.

== Geography ==
Boston Harbor is located at the intersection of Pickering Passage and Dana Passage, with outlying parts also falling along Budd Inlet. It is located between Dover Point and Dofflemyer Point, which is marked by a distinctive concrete lighthouse that is not publicly accessible by land. Boston Harbor is located across Budd Inlet from Cooper Point; the two form the entrance to Budd Inlet. Boston Harbor is a formerly rural area that has now become an exurb of Olympia, Washington.

== Parks and recreation ==
The community is home to the Boston Harbor Marina and sits near Squaxin Park (formerly Priest Point Park) and Burfoot Park. The marina is often the location for community social gatherings, most notably in the Spring and Summer months. A public boat launch adjacent the marina is jointly owned by the Washington Department of Fish and Wildlife (WDFW) and Thurston County.

== Education ==
Children in the area attend the formerly independent Boston Harbor School since the early 1900s, now part of the Olympia School District. The school also serves as a community center for the rural area of northern Thurston County.

== See also ==
- Jeal Point
- Zangle Cove
