= Sylvester Park =

Historic park in downtown Olympia, Washington, USA

- U.S. National Register of Historic Places
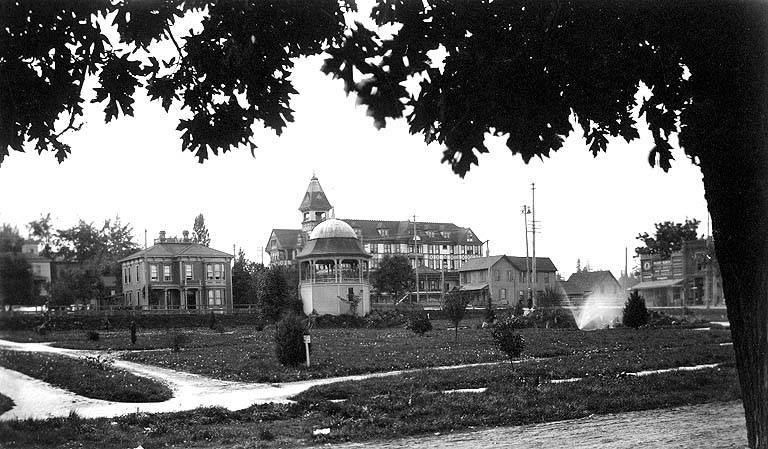
- Circa 1899, featuring bandstand and sprinkler
- Interactive map of Park location
- Location: 615 Washington St SE, Olympia, Washington 98501
- Coordinates: 47.04287°N 122.90077°W
- Area: 1.57 acres (0.64 ha)
- Built: 1850
- Architectural style: New England style
- NRHP reference No.: 87000868
- Added to NRHP: June 17, 1987

Sylvester Park is a historic city park in downtown Olympia, Washington listed on the National Register of Historic Places. It was donated for public use by Edmund Sylvester in 1850 and was later under the jurisdiction of the state government from 1905 to 1955. Between c. 1901 – c. 1927, the park was known as Capitol Plaza.

== History ==
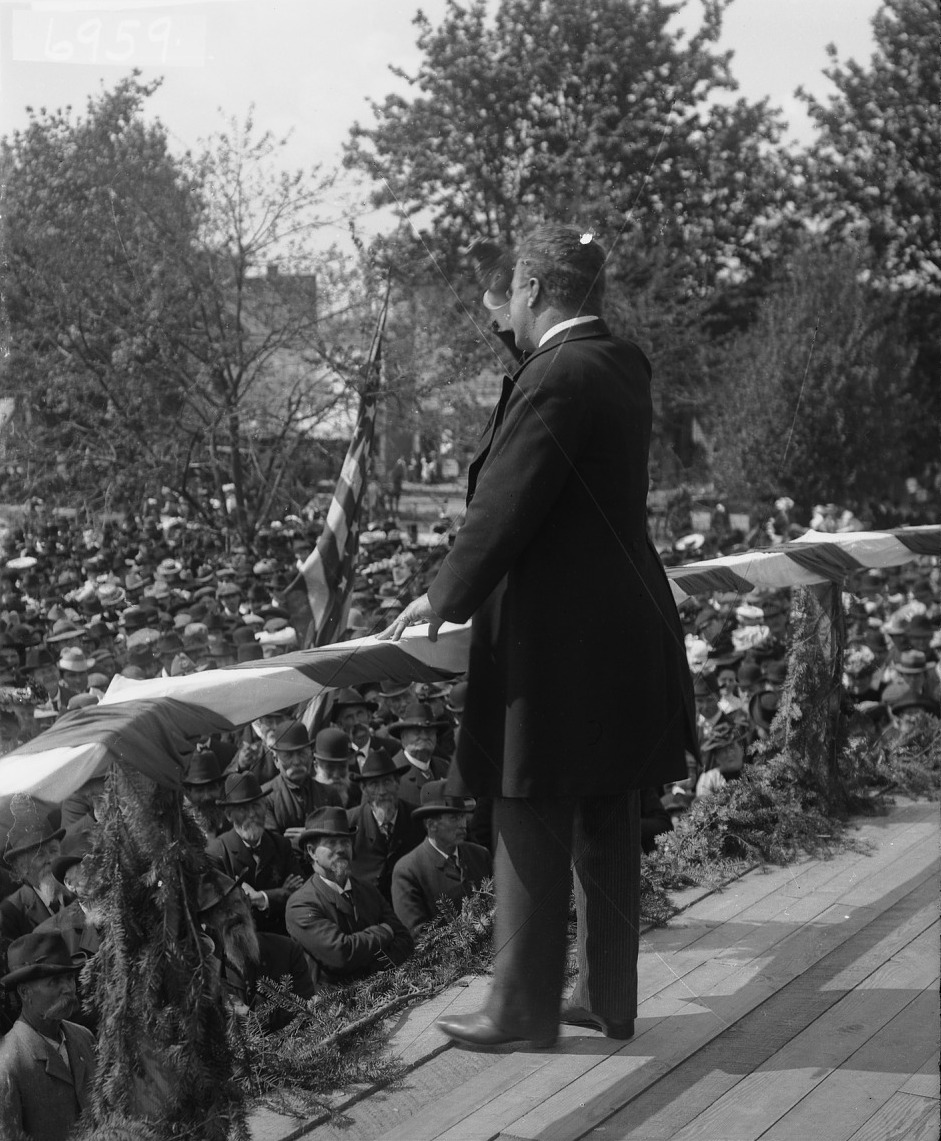
President Roosevelt delivering a speech, May 1903

Edmund Sylvester donated the land (block 16 on the city's original plat) for public use to the city in 1850. The lot remained undeveloped for several years before being cleared and fortified with a blockhouse.

During the Puget Sound War, the park was occupied by Olympia residents fleeing the conflict. In 1855, William White was killed by Wa-Le-Hut (Yelm Jim) which alarmed several hundred residents. Sometime in October-November, a 15 feet (4.6 m) high blockade was built along 4th Avenue (now Legion Way SE), bay-to-bay with a gate at Main Street, a cannon and nightly armed patrols secured residents, expecting to shelter north of the blockade; however, no attack actually took place.

In 1893, a year after the Old Capitol Building across the street was completed, the park was officially landscaped with a Victorian bandstand, a pond stocked with fish, maple and beech trees, and clamshell-surfaced walking paths. The park block was surrounded with a decorative iron fence.

On May 22, 1903, President Theodore Roosevelt delivered a 40 minute speech to a crowd of thousands at the park.

The bandstand was demolished in 1928 and the pond was filled in some time after World War II.

In 1955, the legislature passed an act to retract Olympia's proprietary rights to the park, to build an underground parking garage on the site. The city enacted a protective ordinance to preserve the park through a vote the same year.

The current gazebo was constructed in 1975 and is approximately 472 feet (144 m) in size.

== Markers ==
The park contains several historic markers:

List of Historic Markers in Sylvester Park, Olympia, WA.
Marker	Dedicated	Description	Image
John Rogers Statue	January 19, 1905	A granite statue of Governor John Rankin Rogers at the east central side of the park.	
Women's Christian Temperance Union Emma Page Fountain	July 29, 1912; re-dedicated in 2000 after repairs to 1997 vandalism	A drinking water fountain in honor of Emma Page.	
Oregon Trail Marker	February 22, 1913	A native granite boulder at the northwest corner of the park, bearing bronze plaque marking the end of the Oregon Trail. Donated by the Sacajawea Chapter, National Society Daughters of the American Revolution (DAR) of Olympia.	
Edmund Sylvester Marker		A bench in honor of Edmund Sylvester.	

== Gallery ==
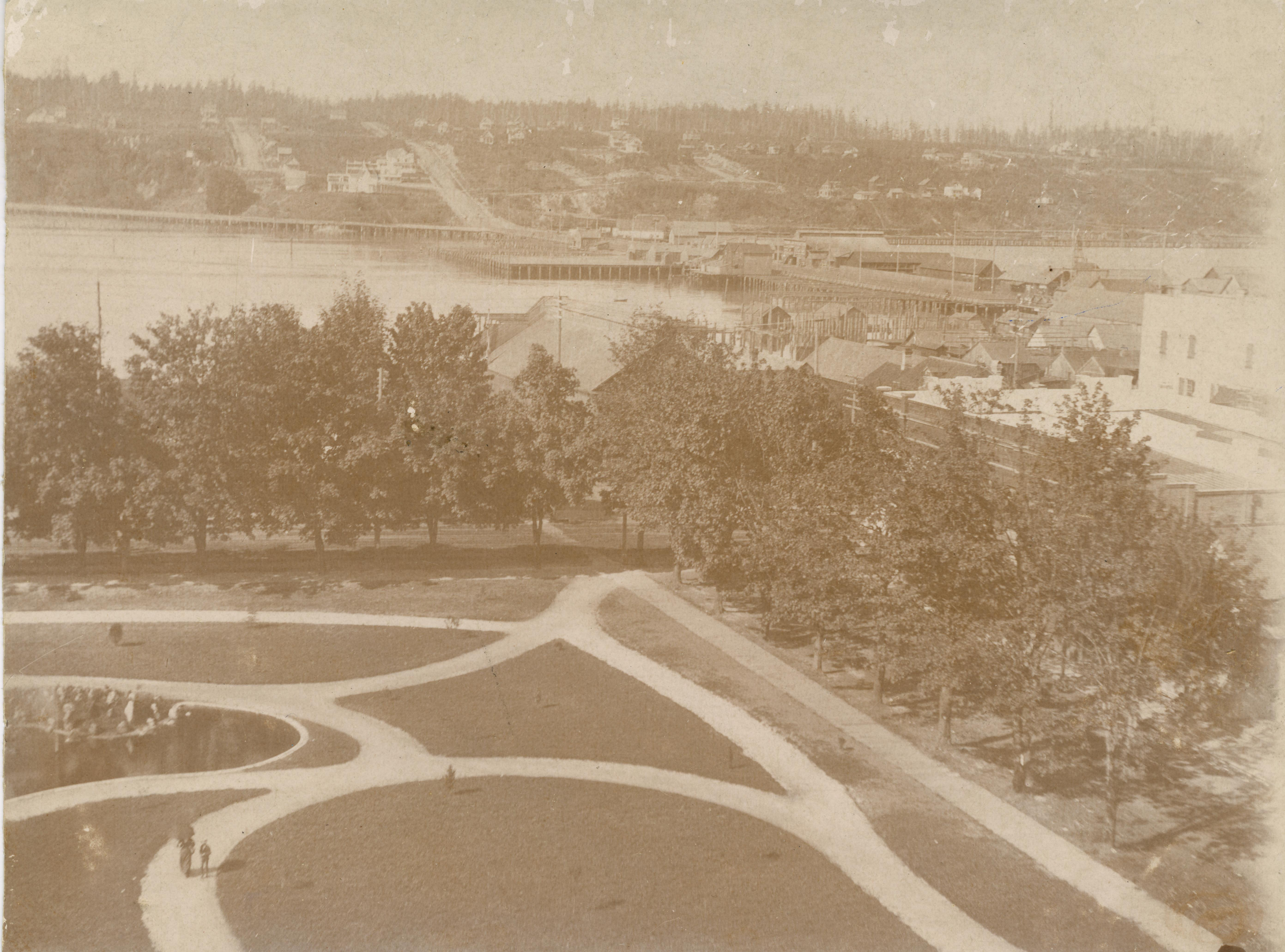
Looking Northwest, circa 1899.

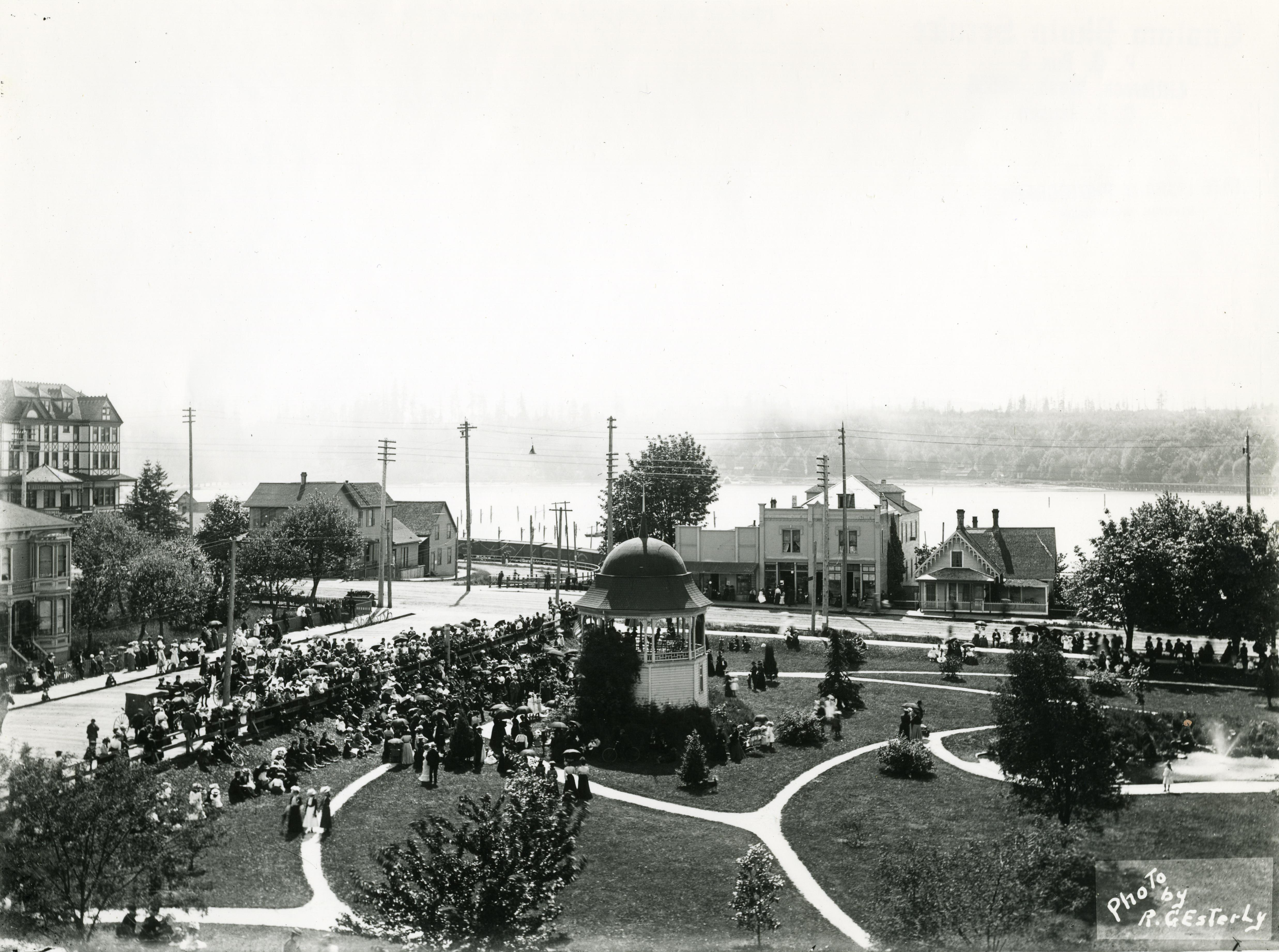
Looking west from the Old State Capitol building, circa 1895-1904.

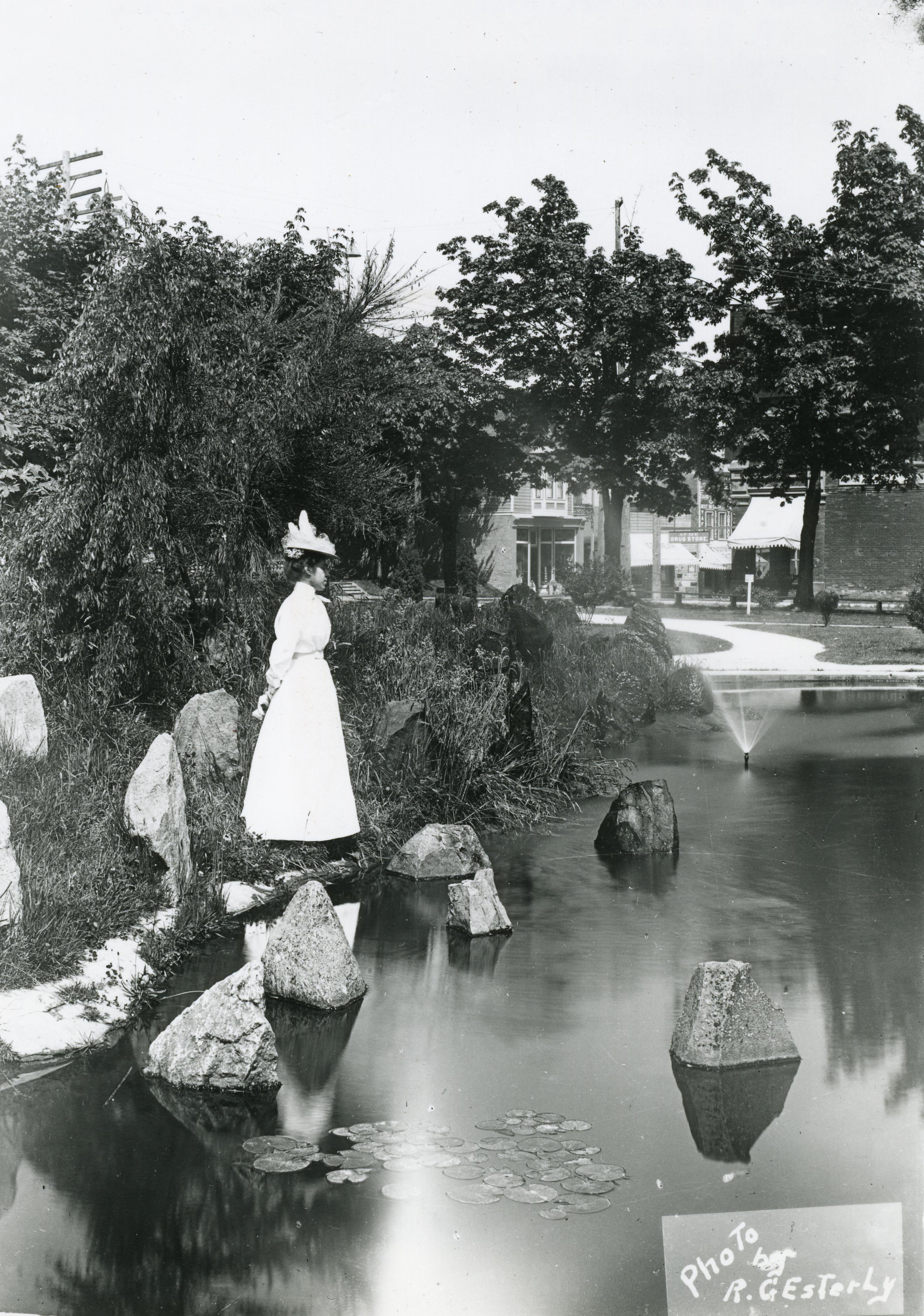
Standing on the edge of pond, circa 1910.

== See also ==
Media related to Sylvester Park at Wikimedia Commons

- History of Olympia, Washington
- National Register of Historic Places listings in Thurston County, Washington
- Olympia Downtown Historic District
- Parks and recreation in Olympia, Washington
