= Merrill Lake (Washington) =

- Location within Washington (state)
- Location: Cowlitz County, Washington
- Coordinates: 46°05′39″N 122°19′27″W
- Type: lake
- Basin countries: United States
- Surface elevation: 1,526 ft (465 m)

Merrill Lake is a lake in the U.S. state of Washington.

Merrill Lake was named after the father-in-law of a first settler.

== See also ==
- List of lakes in Washington
