= Henderson Inlet =

Inlet in Puget Sound, Washington state

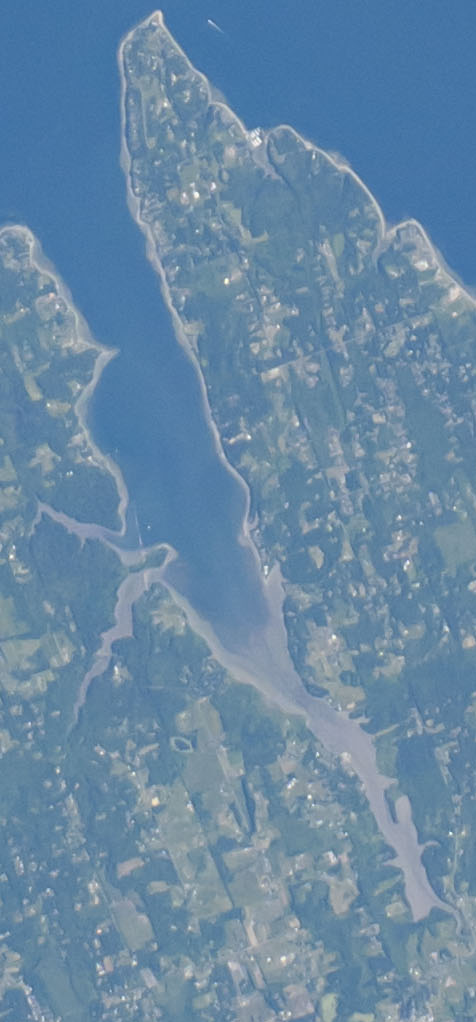
- View from ISS Expedition 71, June 2024
- Location: Thurston County, Washington
- Coordinates: 47.1451°N 122.8349°W
- Type: Inlet
- Part of: South Puget Sound
- Ocean/sea sources: Salish Sea

Henderson Inlet is a small, southern inlet of Puget Sound, Washington state, situated between Budd Inlet to the west and Nisqually Reach to the east. It is located in Thurston County, and the nearest city is Olympia, the state capital. Henderson Inlet was named in 1841 by Charles Wilkes, commander of the United States Exploring Expedition, after James Henderson, who served as quartermaster. A variant name is "South Bay".

== History ==
The shores of Henderson Inlet were once inhabited by the Nisqually people, of whom one branch, the Noosehchatle, had a settlement named Tuts'e'tcaxt in the Woodard Bay area, on the western shore of the inlet. Tuts'e'tcaxt comprised two cedar plank houses measuring 30 by 100 feet, inhabited by about a dozen natives who lived there during the inclement winter months, according to an 1854 report by George Gibbs, an agent of the territorial governor. Archaeologists suspect the presence of many tribal burials along both shores of the inlet, where evidence of native use exists in the form of numerous shell middens.

The first British garrison in the area, the fur trading post of Fort Nisqually (now part of DuPont), was established by the Hudson's Bay Company in 1833, some 10 miles east of Henderson Inlet. American settlers arrived shortly thereafter, and in 1846, under the terms of the Oregon Treaty, the area became part of the United States of America. In 1854 a millwright named Harvey Rice Woodard made a claim to the land around the bay that still bears his name, Woodard Bay, which soon became the location of a thriving logging industry that survived, though much diminished in its final years, until 1984.

In 1940 the 15th Infantry Regiment, United States Army, which had been based at Fort Lewis, near Tacoma, since 1938, set up an Amphibious Training Camp on Henderson Inlet, north of Woodard Bay, with a pier, administrative buildings, barracks, and mess hall. The regiment operated this facility until 1942.

Since 1987 a large section of the western shore of Henderson Inlet has been managed by the Woodard Bay Natural Resources Conservation Area. This includes the former property of the Weyerhaeuser Timber Company and, to its north, part of the historic Esterly Farm and its associated woodland, which according to local folklore, possibly deriving from native legends, is populated by elves. The conservation area, now covering 600 acres, has expanded in stages by purchasing surrounding properties as they became available, and has developed into an important sanctuary for birds, bats, seals and otters.

== See also ==
- History of Olympia, Washington
- Libby Creek
- List of geographic features in Thurston County, Washington
