= Budd Inlet =

Inlet in Puget Sound, Washington state

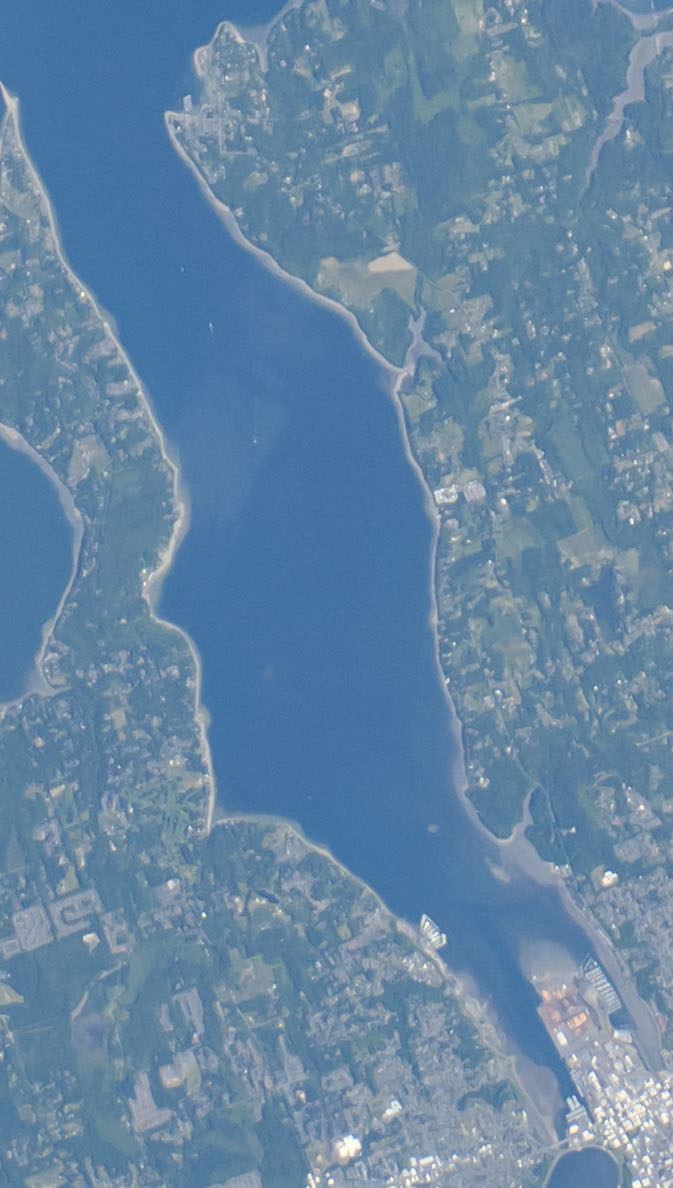
- View from ISS Expedition 71, June 2024
- Location: Thurston County, Washington
- Coordinates: 47°5′39″N 122°54′48.7″W
- Type: Inlet
- Etymology: Thomas A. Budd
- Part of: South Puget Sound
- River sources: Deschutes River
- Ocean/sea sources: Salish Sea
- Max. length: 6.84 mi (11.01 km)
- Max. width: 1.86 mi (2.99 km)
- Average depth: 27 feet (8.2 m)
- Sections/sub-basins: West Bay, East Bay
- Settlements: Olympia, Washington

Budd Inlet is an inlet located at the southernmost end of Puget Sound in Thurston County, Washington, surrounded on three sides by the City of Olympia.

== Etymology ==
Budd Inlet was named by Charles Wilkes during the United States Exploring Expedition, to honor Thomas A. Budd, who served as acting master of the Peacock and Vincennes. A portion of the coast of Antarctica, Budd Coast, is also named for Thomas Budd.

== History ==
Historically, the shores surrounding Budd Inlet were occupied by village sites of the Steh-Chass (or Stehchass), Lushootseed-speaking peoples who became part of the post-treaty Squaxin Island Tribe.

Around 1850, American settlers founded the city of Olympia at the southern end of Budd Inlet.

On March 7, 1976, several local residents attempted to stop the capture of six Bigg's orca that had been driven into Budd Inlet by a joint boat and seaplane effort under a SeaWorld permit. Known as the "Budd Inlet Six", the transient killer whales were captured by the use of explosives and nets. After the event was covered in the media, and following protests, the permits were challenged and found to be in arrears of a state law requiring that whales must be accorded to "swim naturally and not be chased". A federal lawsuit was filed and SeaWorld agreed that they would make no further attempts to capture orcas in Washington state waters. The company also agreed to release the Budd Inlet Six. Further federal prohibitions against capturing killer whales were implemented that same year. The city of Olympia adopted a resolution to declare 2026 as “Budd Inlet Six – 50th Anniversary Year", and every March 7 as Budd Inlet Six Commemoration Day.

== Geography ==
Budd Inlet is 6.84 mi (11.01 km) long and has a maximum breadth of 1.86 mi (2.99 km). The southern end of Budd Inlet is divided into two channels – West Bay and East Bay – by a peninsula that was artificially broadened throughout the late 19th and early 20th century. The entrance to Budd Inlet is formed by two peninsulas: Cooper Point, and Boston Harbor, Washington.

The Deschutes River empties into West Bay just north of Tumwater Falls. The mudflats that existed here were dammed and submerged beneath Capitol Lake in 1949.

During c. 1909 – c. 1911, a deepwater shipping channel was dredged in East Bay to provide deep water access to the Port of Olympia, formed on November 7, 1922.

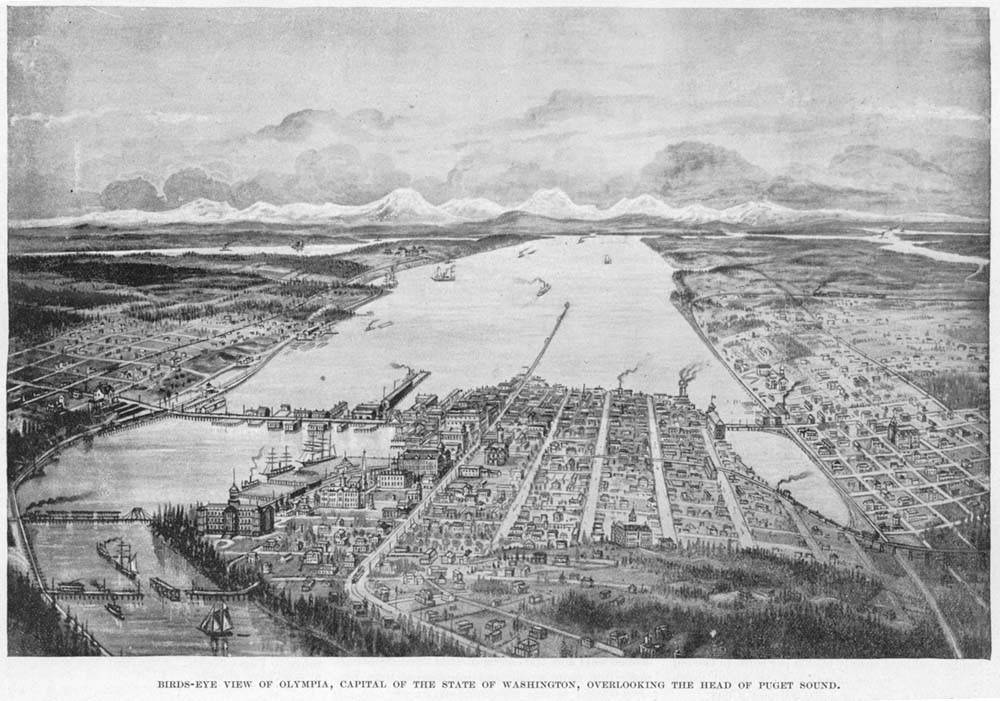
Looking north over Olympia and Budd Inlet, 1893

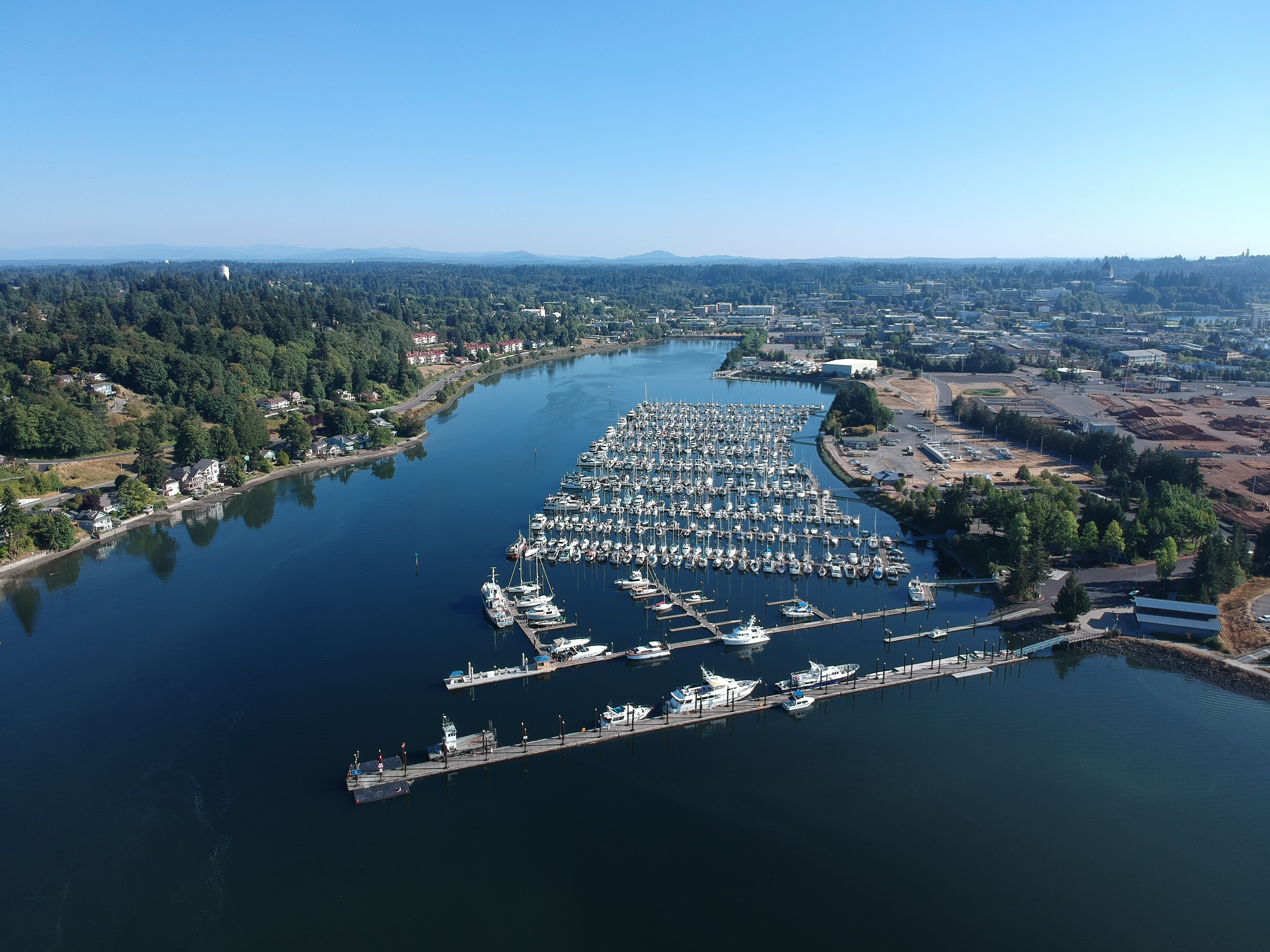
Looking south towards East Bay, 2018

== Ecology ==
The inlet is contaminated from historical industrial activity (such as sawmills and plywood manufacturing) taking place in the area over the past century. Inlet sediment samples were found to contain dioxins, dioxin-like polychlorinated biphenyls, polycyclic aromatic hydrocarbons, pentachlorophenol, and metals such as mercury, arsenic, cadmium.

On May 15, 2025, as a result of a biotoxin which produces Diarrhetic shellfish poisoning being detected, the inlet was closed to recreational shellfish harvesting.

A significant cleanup and restoration project is currently underway, with construction estimated to begin in 2027.

== See also ==
- Burfoot Park
- List of geographic features in Thurston County, Washington
- Mud Bay
- Henderson Inlet
