= Scott Lake, Washington =

Unincorporated community in Washington, United States

Scott Lake Community
- Community
- Scott Lake Community Center, 2009
- Interactive map of Scott Lake Community
- Coordinates: 46°55′14.15″N 122°56′22.07″W
- Country: United States
- State: Washington
- County: Thurston

Area
  - Water: 0.1 sq mi (0.26 km^{2})
- Elevation: 190–330 ft (58–100.5 m)

Population (2012)
  - Total: +/- 1,400
- Time zone: UTC-8 (Pacific (PST))
  - Summer (DST): UTC-7 (PDT)
- ZIP Codes: 98512
- Area code(s): 360, 564

Scott Lake is an unincorporated community in Washington State, located beside Scott Lake. Its location is Section 33, Township 17N, Range 2W, Willamette Meridian and Section 4, Township 16N, Range 2W, Willamette Meridian. The Scott Lake Community had 581 houses as of March 9, 2009, which would likely place the population around 1,505 people based on the average number of people per household in the United States.

== History ==
Since 1947, the official name of the body of water is Scott Lake; it was originally called Scott's Lake. The name, Scotts Lake, without the apostrophe, is still officially listed as a variant name. The lake was likely named after Joseph M. Scott who homesteaded a property in 1869. The corner of the property came close the lake.

In September 1961, a trust agreement between E. Clifford, J. Clifford, Richard A. Clifford, Edward A. Clifford, B. Clifford, Josephine Clifford, Charles B. Jennings, P. Jennings, J. Swanson, V. Swanson, Paul O. O’ Reilly, and June O’ Reilly was made to form the Scott Lake Development Company. The Scott Lake Development Company bought the farm next to Scott Lake to turn it into a housing development. The land was surveyed and platted by Hugh G. Goldsmith. The first building in the Scott Lake Community was a real-estate office, built in 1961. On February 21, 1962, all roads in the Scott Lake Community were dedicated to the public. On March 29, 1962, the Scott Lake Development Company filed with the state as a corporation. During the early years of this development, the Scott Lake Community was accessible from Interstate 5. McCorckle Road, also known as 113th Avenue, used to be a crossroad that intersected the freeway.

On August 4, 1991, a 1947 single-engine RC-3 Republic CB airplane crashed into the waters of Scott Lake.

On June 29, 2003, a large fire broke out on the side of Champion Hill. Seven fire departments worked over three hours putting out the fire. Due to the winds, the fire burned up over 4 acres (16,000 m^{2}).

== Geography ==
The highest point in the Scott Lake Community is the top of Champion Hill, which sits at an elevation of 100.5 m (330 ft). The lowest point in the Scott Lake Community is the surface of Scott Lake, which sits at an elevation of 189 ft (58 m).

There are 38 streets in the Scott Lake Community. The Scott Lake Community forms two voter precincts, Scott Lake North and Scott Lake South.

== Points of interest ==
Scott Lake Grocery, 2009

The Scott Lake Community Center is a building owned by the Scott Lake Maintenance Company, a non-profit community owned organization. The Scott Lake Community Center is where decisions are made for the community by the Scott Lake Board of Trustees. The community center is used to hold an annual community garage sale. The community center is also rented out for private events as well.

The Scott Lake Store was built in 1962. The store has been called Scott Lake Grocery since before 1984, and has sold gas for many years. As of 2009, Scott Lake Grocery was on its eighth owner. The business s located at the entrance of the Scott Lake Community and also serves as a gas station. It has been in existence since 1962.

== Recreation ==
Scott Lake Park, a private park by the lake, opened to community residents was built in 1963.

The Scott Lake Country Club, known as the Scott Lake Golf Course, officially opened on April 30, 1965, and the opening lasted until May 9. It started out as a nine-hole golf course. In the 1970s, it was expanded to an 18-hole golf course. Half of the golf course could only be used during the summer dry months. The ground was too wet and muddy to use that half during the rest of the year. The cost to maintain it was too expensive, and the golf course was reduced back to a nine-hole golf course. Scott Lake Golf Course located next to the lake. The Scott Lake Golf Course has been in existence since 1964.

== Infrastructure ==
The Scott Lake Maintenance Company, a non-profit community-owned organization, formed on July 5, 1973. The water system was turned over to the board of directors that day; it was the formation of Scott Lake Water. The Scott Lake Community Center was built in 1973.

In 1975, Thurston County changed the names of 27 roads in the Scott Lake Community during a county-wide change.
