= Yelm–Rainier–Tenino Trail =

Rail trail in Washington, United States

Coordinates: 46°53′06″N 122°41′46″W

Yelm-Rainier-Tenino Trail
- Length: 14.5 miles (23.3 km)
- Location: Thurston County, Washington
- Began construction: 1993
- Use: Walking, Hiking, Biking
- Elevation change: 320 feet (98 m)
- Grade: Flat
- Difficulty: Easy to moderate
- Sights: McIntosh Lake, Deschutes River
- Hazards: Multiple crossings of roadways
- Surface: Paved

The Yelm–Rainier–Tenino Trail, formerly the Yelm–Tenino Trail, is a rail trail located in Thurston County, Washington, United States.

== History ==
The trail, acquired by the county in 1993, has been constructed along the route of a former Burlington Northern Railroad (BNR) line. The railroad track was operational beginning in 1869. The section that became the Yelm–Rainier–Tenino Trail was originally named "The Prairie Line," but in 1986 the rail line from Yelm to Tenino was abandoned.

The trail was operational by 2005, with an additional 7-mile (11 km) stretch opened in April of that year. The span officially connected Tenino to the path.

The trail was renamed in late 2021. Previously the "Yelm–Tenino Trail", the name now incorporates the city of Rainier, which maintains a portion of the trail that bisects the area and the city's limits.

In 2024, the city of Tenino began plans to extend the trail through the community's downtown area, placing the western terminus near the intersection of Crowder Road and West Park Avenue. The project was completed by 2026. During the same year, the city of Yelm completed an extension of the trail over the Nisqually River, shifting the eastern terminus onto the Pierce County-side of the span. The new pathway, known as the Prairie Line Trail, is planned to connect to the town of Roy.

== Route ==
The trail is a 14.5-mile (23.3 km) long paved path designated for use for cycling and walking; motorized use of the trail is prohibited. The trail runs parallel to State Route 507 (SR 507), at one point crossing the highway outside of Tenino; it is the only occurrence of the trail crossing SR 507.

From Tenino, heading east, the trail courses past the southern shore of McIntosh Lake, spans over the Deschutes River, and then intersects with the southern end of the Chehalis Western Trail in approximately 6.5 miles (10.5 km). Trailheads are located at the trail termini outside of Yelm over the Nisqually Bridge and southwest of Tenino's City Park, with additional parking lots and entry points along the trail.Rainier straddles the trail approximately 8.5-mile (13.7 km) east of Tenino. The trail is mainly flat, with a combined elevation change of approximately 320 feet (98 m) over its course.

== Events ==
The trail is used by bicyclists participating in the annual Seattle to Portland Bicycle Classic as they ride from Yelm to Tenino.

== Artwork ==
A copper wind sculpture was installed at the Prairie Line Trailhead in Yelm at the end of 2023. Symbolizing a tree, the Santa Fe, New Mexico artwork known as Ponderosa was part of an initiative to begin a creative district in the community. The following spring, a metal sculpture made of recycled argon cylinders used for welding was added to a trailhead cross-corner from Yelm City Park. The artwork, titled Centennial Bloom, was donated by a Centralia sculptor to the city in honor of Yelm's 2024 centennial. The sculpture depicts a cube metamorphosizing into a dodecahedron. The same artist also donated another metal sculpture displayed on the trail in Tenino.

== See also ==
- Karen Fraser Woodland Trail
- List of rail trails
