= Chehalis Western Trail =

Rail trail in Thurston County, Washington, US

Coordinates: 46°53′10″N 122°44′40″W

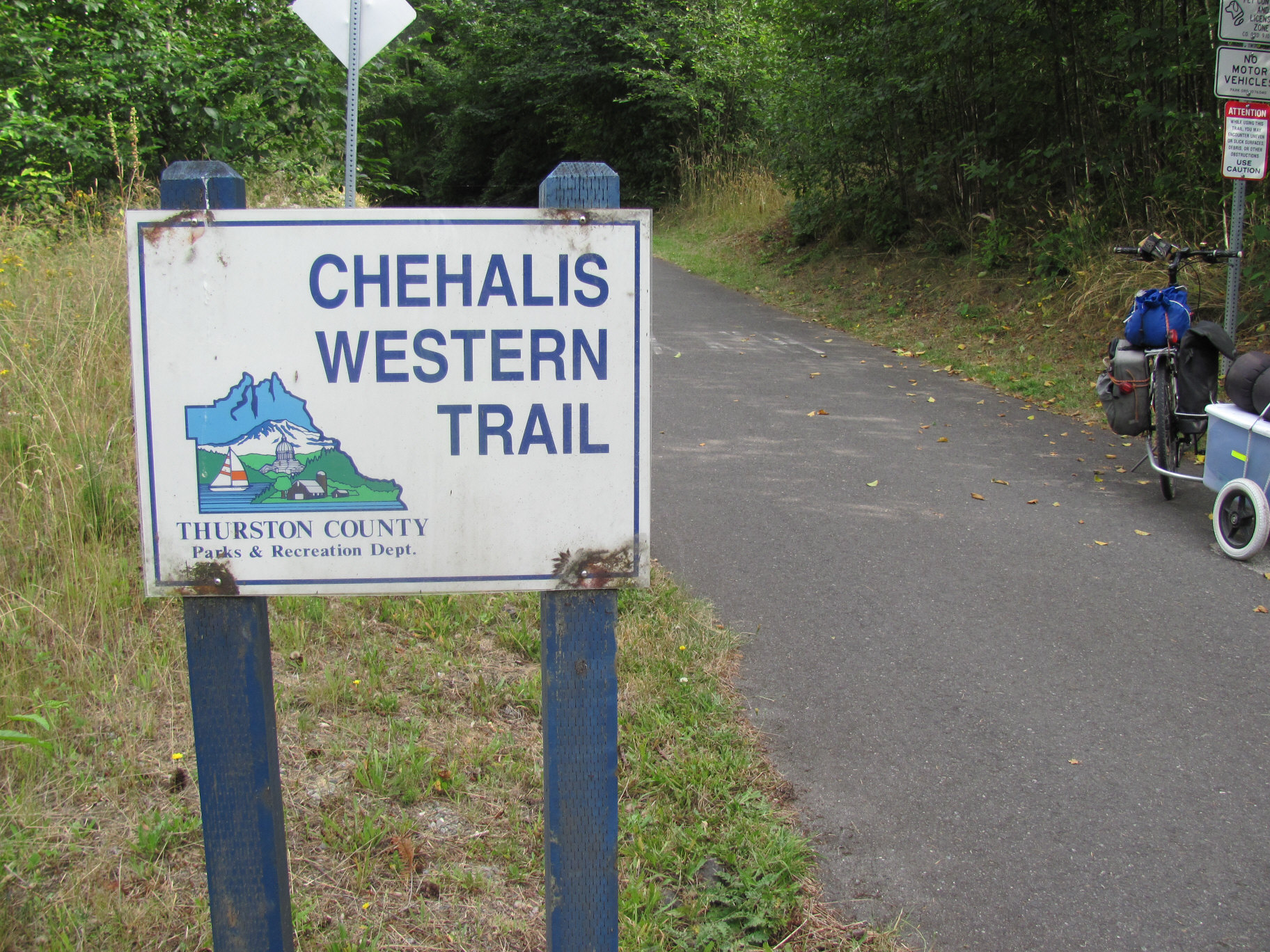
- Trail marker of the Chehalis Western Trail
- Length: 22 miles (35 km)
- Location: Thurston County, Washington
- Established: September 27, 1998
- Trailheads: Multiple, including Woodard Bay Natural Resources Conservation Area and Yelm–Rainier–Tenino Trail
- Use: Biking, hiking, horse riding
- Elevation change: Minimal elevation gain
- Grade: Flat
- Difficulty: Easy to moderate
- Season: Open year-round
- Sights: Monarch Contemporary Art Center and Sculpture Park, Deschutes River
- Hazards: Multiple crossings of roadways
- Surface: Paved, mostly wheelchair accessible
- Maintainer: Thurston County Public Works, Lacey and Olympia parks departments
- Website: Thurston County Public Works - Chehalis Western Trail

The Chehalis Western Trail is a 22-mile (35 km) rail trail in Thurston County, Washington, and is the longest shared-use path in the region. The trail, encompassing 170 acres (69 ha), occupies an abandoned railroad corridor that was once used by the historic Weyerhaeuser-owned Chehalis Western Railroad. The rail line was converted to a bicycle and walking trail and intersects with the 14.5-mile (23.3 km) Yelm–Rainier–Tenino Trail and the 4.7-mile (7.6 km) Karen Fraser Woodland Trail.

The trail officially opened in 1998 and an effort to fully connect the entire pathway by building three bridges over roads in the area, including a span over Interstate 5, was begun in 2001. The project, known as "Bridging the Gap", was completed in 2014. Thurston County took full ownership of the entire length of the trail in 2009 by receiving a transfer of the northern leg of the pathway that connected to the Woodard Bay Natural Resources Conservation Area. A roundabout connection with the Karen Fraser Woodland Trail, known as Hub Junction, was completed in 2016. Several additions for overlooks and certain safety measures, such as an underpass beneath active railroad tracks, have been undertaken during the 2010s.

The Chehalis Western Trail spans roughly south from its northern terminus at the Woodard Bay protected site where it ends at the Yelm–Rainier–Tenino Trail. The paved pathway is flat in elevation and passes through various ecosystems and several communities including East Olympia, Lacey, Olympia, and Skookumchuck. The trail, which contains dozens of trailheads and access points, also courses by the Monarch Contemporary Art Center and Sculpture Park and parallels the Deschutes River for several miles. An expansion to Vail has been proposed on multiple occasions.

== History ==
=== Beginnings and construction ===
The rail line was used by the Weyerhaeuser company for approximately 60 years to haul timber logs into the Puget Sound region. The Chehalis Western Railroad operated on the line. A dedication and grand opening of the path was held on September 27, 1998 and at the time, consisted of a combined 150 acres (61 ha) spanning various ecosystems. The opening included the trail's long-standing 2-mile (3.2 km) route along the Deschutes River and was not yet connected to the Yelm–Tenino Trail (YRT). (Note: The Yelm–Tenino Trail was renamed the Yelm–Rainier–Tenino Trail in 2021.)

In 2001, approximately 100,000 people were estimated to have used the trail and about 13 miles (21 km) had been paved. A $462,000 grant that year from the state's Interagency Committee for Outdoor Recreation allowed for a southern, 7-mile (11 km) stretch that connected to the Yelm-Tenino Trail to be fully completed and paved; the effort was begun in late 2002. Finished by September 2003, a dedication ceremony was held and a bronze and granite plaque was installed at the junction of the two trails.

A group of volunteer senior officers began patrolling the Lacey portion of the trail in 2004 after a series of crimes were noted on or near the path, including the rape and murder of Ashley Parks, a 15-year old the prior year.

An equestrian center is situated off the trail near the YRT junction outside of Rainier. By late 2004, the Northwest Equestrian Center had not been issued permits from the Thurston County Public Works Department (TCPW) to allow horses and riders to cross the trail between the center's parcels, potentially putting future competitions in jeopardy. The TCPW noted that the safety and enjoyment of trail users were a priority and that the center could not promise to cross over the pathway during organized events.

=== Completion ===
The Karen Fraser Woodland Trail, then known as the Woodland Trail, was officially connected to the Chehalis Western Trail during a ceremony on December 2, 2007.

Due to breaks in the trail, the path was not yet fully rideable by 2007. Under a project known as "Bridging the Gap" that was begun in 2001, three bridge crossings in the Olympia and Lacey area were completed between 2007 and 2014. Part of a 2005 federal appropriations bill, efforts to begin the construction project began with $4.1 million in funding for a bike and pedestrian bridge over Interstate 5. A groundbreaking was held in July 2006. The project, initially finalized at $1.6 million, was completed and opened with a ribbon-cutting ceremony in February 2007.

The "Bridging the Gap" effort, by early 2007, was estimated to cost a total of $11 million. Issues regarding powder coating on the rails of the I-5 span had to be redone a few months after it was opened. Additional expenditures continued, such as associated costs to complete walls and drainage issues, increasing the first bridge project's budget to $2.8 million.

A federal complaint was filed by "bike enthusiasts" to the Federal Highway Administration (FHA) in December 2005 regarding gates at the Chehalis Western and Yelm–Tenino junction. The barriers, installed in 1995 following state and federal guidelines at the time, were meant to limit the use of motorized vehicles on the trail. The complaint stated that the gates were a violation of the Americans With Disabilities Act as it was a hindrance to disabled cyclists. The gates, with a 3 foot (0.91 m) opening, were attempted to be replaced with a 5 foot (1.5 m) opening barricade by the county parks department in October 2006, (Note: The denied 2006 gate replacement cost the county $30,000, equivalent to $47,912 in 2025.) but the work was stopped by order of the FHA citing new rules that posts or traffic bollards must be used instead. The gates were replaced with bollards, and posts installed at most other intersections and trailheads along the Chehalis Western Trail, by October 2007 at a cost of $30,000, equivalent to $46,582 in 2025. (Note: The 2007 bollard installation project also included stop signs and various signage for animal control, non-motorized access, and crossing warnings at intersections along the trail.)

Since the beginning of the trail's construction and opening, Thurston County had been the owner of the 15.5-mile (24.9 km) "southern leg" of the Chehalis Western. The county took full ownership of the entire path in July 2009, procuring the northern, 5.5-mile (8.9 km) span that reached Woodard Bay Natural Resources Conservation Area. The non-monetary transfer from the Washington Department of Natural Resources was based on the conclusion that the county would achieve a "higher level of service" and provide better maintenance to the section.

The second pedestrian bridge, over Martin Way, was completed in March 2010. Built at a cost of $1.8 million, equivalent to $2,657,561 in 2025, the project was approximately $700,000 under budget, equivalent to $1,033,496 in 2025. U.S. Representative Brian Baird, who helped to provide funding for the bridge, was amongst the crowd to walk the new span for the first time during the dedication ceremony on March 31.

The final bridge, which crosses over Pacific Avenue and spans above the Kite Girl statue in Lacey, was completed in December 2014. The bridge marked the final step in connecting the Chehalis Western to what was then known as the Olympia Woodland Trail. At the crossing is a bicycle traffic circle and plaza known as Hub Junction. Based on 2015 plans designed by landscape architect Robert Droll, the junction was dedicated in March 2016; the roundabout is considered to have been the first such of its type in the state. Responsibility of the junction remained unclear until 2021 when Thurston County and the cities of Lacey and Olympia formally agreed to cooperative management and oversight of the roundabout area.

By 2016, four overlooks and "resting spots" had been completed along the trail; the Lacey Rotary Club undertook the construction efforts. The first overlook, located at Chambers Lake, was constructed in 1997.

An underpass was constructed beginning in late 2019 under an active railroad track near Rainier Road and Talcott Ridge Drive. The project was estimated to cost $1.7 million.

=== Continuing history ===
A repaving of the Woodard Bay-to-Yelm Highway section was announced in August 2026; the project is estimated to cost over $2.2 million and will also include new signage and striping. Referred to as "rolling closures", the northern sections of the Chehalis Western will be closed 1 mile (1.6 km) at a time during the endeavor; no detours are planned. The project is expected to be completed by early to mid-2027, depending on the weather.

== Route ==
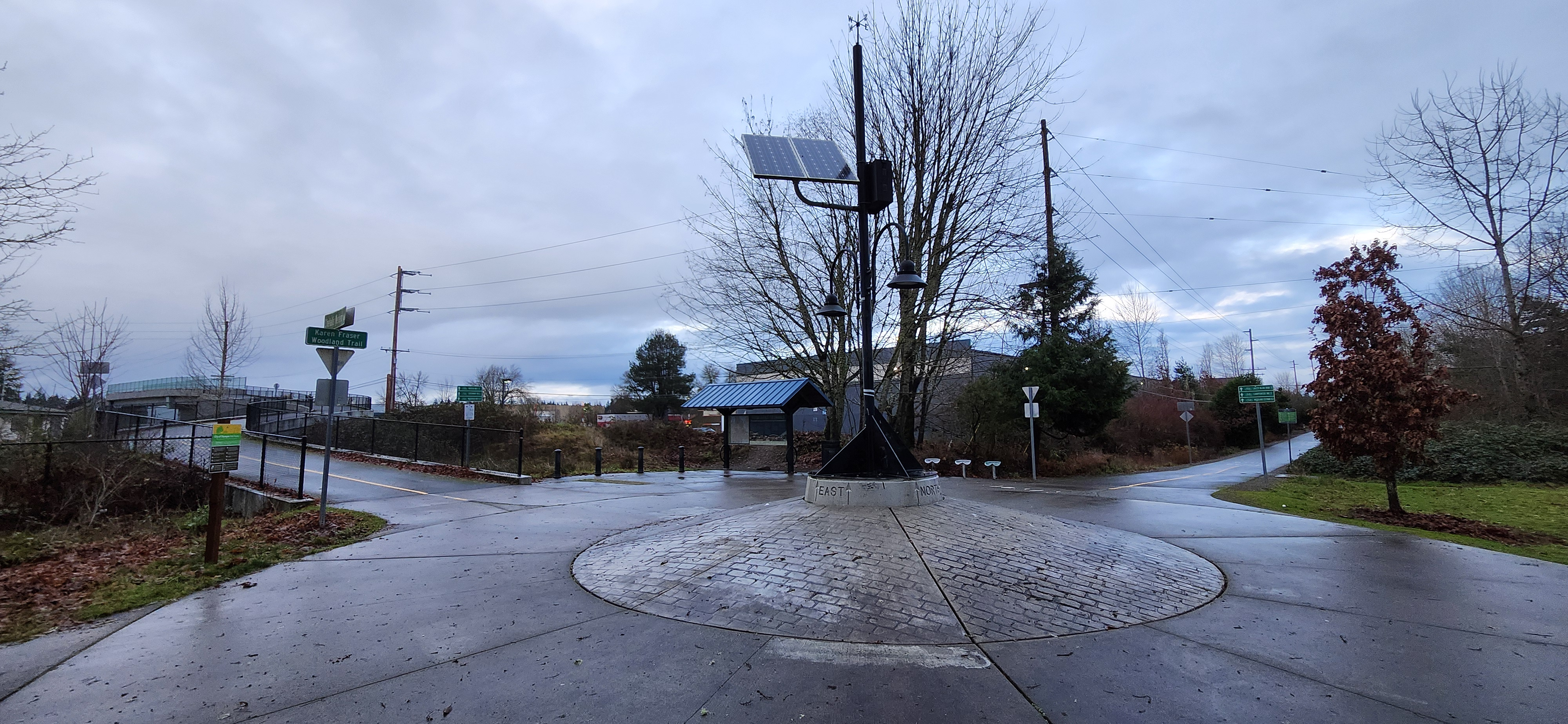
Hub Junction, 2026

The trail, also known under the name Woodland Bay Trail, is the longest in the county. It is approximately 22 miles (35 km) in length. (Note: Differing accounts list various other lengths of the trail, such as 21.5 miles (34.6 km) and 24 miles (39 km).) The trail is flat and is listed as easy to moderate. It is wheelchair accessible for most of its length and there are several dozen trailhead and access points. It is open year-round but the Woodard Bay trailhead is closed in some years to protect nesting herons at the conservation area. The trail passes through several cities and communities including, Olympia, South Bay, Lacey, East Olympia, and Skookumchuck.

Starting at its most northern point, the multi-purpose path begins at the Woodard Bay Natural Resources Conservation Area and runs mostly south to southeast towards its terminus at the intersection of the Yelm-Rainier-Tenino Trail. The Woodard Bay section, known as the northern leg or segment, is 5.3 miles (8.5 km) in length. In between, the course crosses the Karen Fraser Woodland Trail at the Hub Junction roundabout. The trail later intersects with the Interstate 5 bike trail, an 8-mile (13 km)-long path that parallels the highway.

Over 351,000 people were estimated to have used the trail in 2015.

== Ecology ==
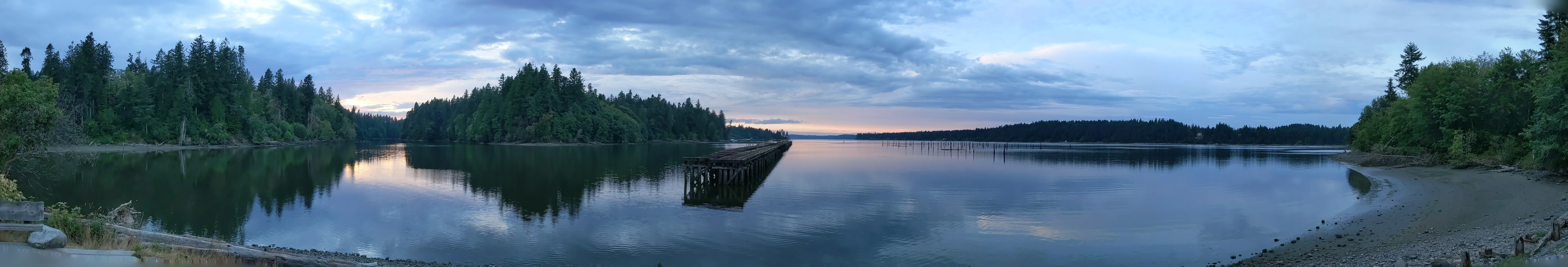
Woodard Bay Natural Resources Conservation Area, 2019

The Chehalis Western Trail passes through a variety of landscapes, including prairies, farm and ranch lands, ponds, and dense forests of cedar, fir, and maple. The Woodard Bay conservation area is home to a large heron colony and visitors can spot bald eagles, a diverse array of songbirds, various bat species, and several types of aquatic animals such as otters and seals. The historic area along the trail also contains a freshwater pond, second-growth forest, and former pastures.

Efforts to remove Scotch broom, an invasive plant on the trail, was undertaken in late-2003. Students from a "Stream Scene" science class at Komachin Middle School helped during the project, planting native trees such as cedar, fir, and hemlock, along with Oregon grape and other bushes. The plants were provided by Thurston County's Native Plant Salvage Project.

== Public art and attractions ==
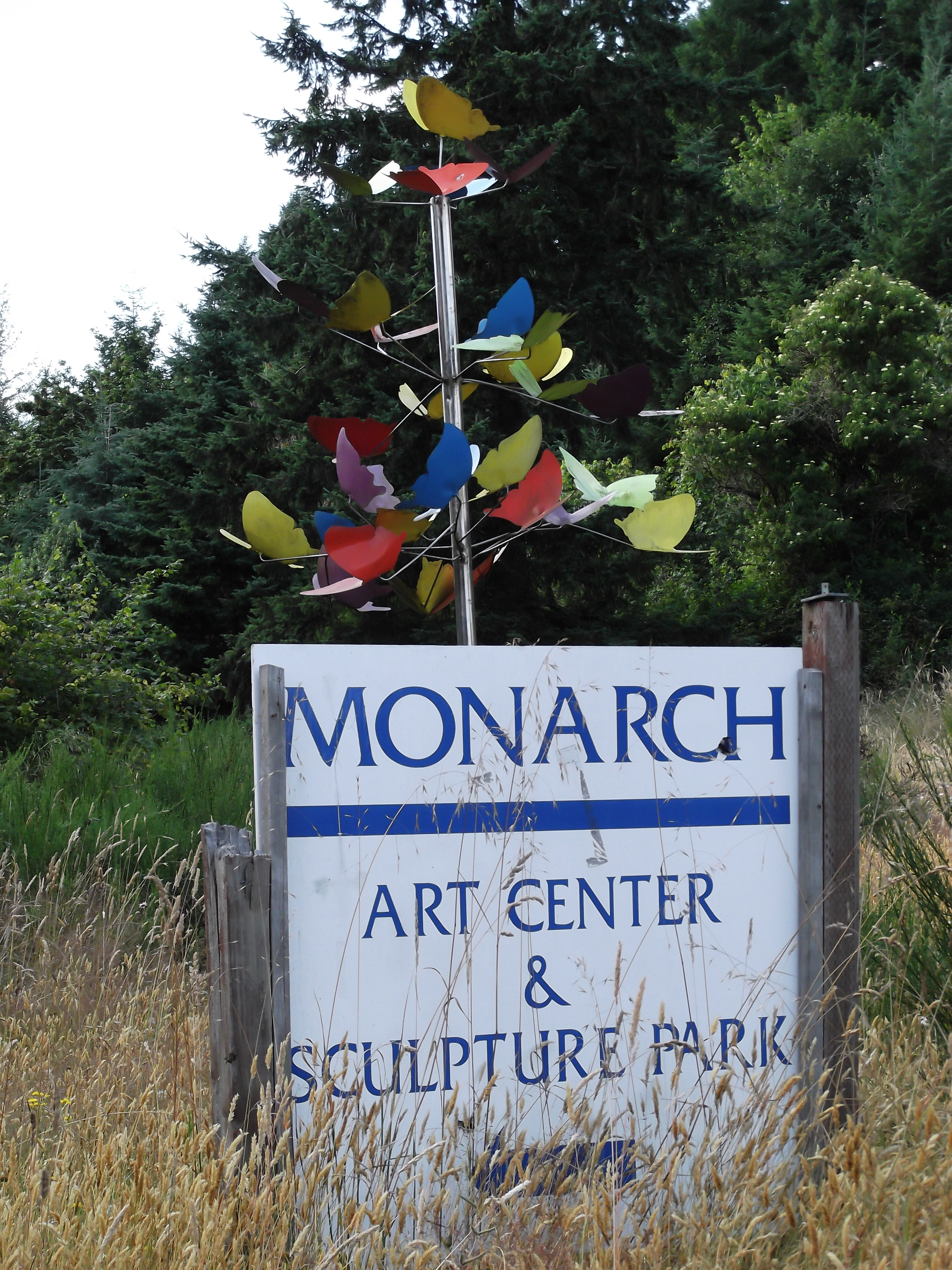
Monarch Contemporary Art Center and Sculpture Park, 2011

Near the intersection with the Yelm–Rainier–Tenino Trail, the Chehalis Western Trail passes through the Monarch Contemporary Art Center and Sculpture Park. Users of the path have access to 170 acres (69 ha) of parks and the trail parallels the Deschutes River, including the original 2-mile (3.2 km) stretch that allows direct views and access to the river.

A "Golden Spike"-inspired commemorative plaque was installed on the path, north of the sculpture park, to denote the completion of the Chehalis Western Trail.

In May 2023, a bench on the trail was dedicated to Bronka Sundstrom (Czyzyk), a survivor of the Holocaust who became the oldest person, at age 77 in 2002, to climb Mount Rainier. Given the moniker "The Lady of the Mountain" for her history at Mount Rainier National Park, she was an avid hiker of the Chehalis Western after she had retired to a nearby community.

== Future plans ==
In the early stages of the construction of the Chehalis Western Trail, a 2.5-mile (4.0 km) extension had been planned to connect to Vail; by 2003, the path, known as the Vail Loop, was delayed by funding and was estimated to take up to six more years. The expansion of the Vail route was reproposed in 2022; it would add over 3 miles (4.8 km) to the course.

== See also ==
- Parks and recreation in Olympia, Washington
