= Spurgeon Creek =

Creek in Thurston County, Washington state

- Etymology: George Spurgeon, pioneer settler

Physical characteristics
- Source
  - coordinates: 46°57′04″N 122°50′55″W

Basin features
- River system: Deschutes River
- Geographic Names Information System: 1508650

Spurgeon Creek is a stream in Thurston County in the U.S. state of Washington. It is a tributary to the Deschutes River.

Spurgeon Creek was named after George Spurgeon, a pioneer who settled at the creek in the 1850s.

== See also ==
- List of geographic features in Thurston County, Washington
