= Offutt Lake, Washington =

Unincorporated community in Washington, United States

- Unincorporated community
- Location within Washington (state) Location within the United States
- Coordinates: 46°54′37″N 122°49′32″W
- Country: United States
- State: Washington
- County: Thurston
- Time zone: UTC-8 (Pacific (PST))
  - Summer (DST): UTC-7 (PDT)

Offutt Lake is an unincorporated community in Thurston County, in the U.S. state of Washington. The community is situated around Offutt Lake and is east of Millersylvania State Park. The populated area of Skookumchuck lies to the east and the city of Tenino is roughly south.

== History ==
A post office called Offut was established in 1913, and remained in operation until 1918. The community takes its name from nearby Offutt Lake. A variant name was "Offutt".
