= Thurston Creek =

Creek in Lewis and Thurston County, Washington state

- Interactive map of Creek location
- Etymology: Named after Thurston County

Location
- Country: United States
- State: Washington
- County: Thurston County

Physical characteristics
- Mouth
  - coordinates: 46°47′54″N 122°26′37″W

Basin features
- River system: Deschutes River
- Geographic Names Information System: 1527196

Thurston Creek is a stream in Lewis and Thurston counties in the U.S. state of Washington. It is a tributary to the Deschutes River.

Thurston Creek takes its name from Thurston County.

== See also ==
- List of geographic features in Lewis County, Washington
- List of geographic features in Thurston County, Washington
