= Monarch Park =

Monarch Park may refer to:

- Monarch Park Stadium, multipurpose stadium in Toronto, Ontario
- Monarch Park Collegiate, high school in Toronto, Ontario
- Monarch Contemporary Art Center and Sculpture Park, Olympia, Washington
