= Bush, Washington =

- Unincorporated community
- Interactive map of Bush, Washington
- Coordinates: 46°58′44″N 122°52′44″W
- Country: United States
- State: Washington
- County: Thurston
- Time zone: UTC-8 (Pacific (PST))
  - Summer (DST): UTC-7 (PDT)

Bush is an unincorporated community in Thurston County, in the U.S. state of Washington. The community is east of the Olympia Regional Airport and southeast of the city of Tumwater.

== History ==
The community was named after George Washington Bush, a pioneer settler.

== Parks and recreation ==
Bush is directly south of Tumwater's Pioneer Park. Three small lakes, Munn Lake, Susan Lake, and Trails End, lie within or near the community.
