= Offutt Lake =

Lake in Thurston County, Washington state

- Location within Washington (state)
- Location: Thurston County, Washington
- Coordinates: 46°55′00″N 122°49′43″W
- Type: Lake
- Etymology: Levi and Milford Offut
- Basin countries: United States
- Surface area: 192 acres (78 ha)
- Max. depth: 25 ft (7.6 m)
- Surface elevation: 236 ft (72 m)
- References: Geographic Names Information System: 1507147

Offutt Lake is a lake in the U.S. state of Washington. The community of Offutt Lake surrounds the area.

The lake has a surface area of 192 acres (78 ha) and reaches a depth of 25 feet (7.6 m).

Offutt Lake was named after Levi and Milford Offutt, early settlers.

== See also ==
- List of geographic features in Thurston County, Washington
- List of lakes in Washington
