= Teiko Tomita =

Japanese poet (1896–1990)

Teiko Tomita (Japanese: 富田 貞子, December 1, 1896 – March 13, 1990) was a Japanese tanka poet who lived in the Pacific Northwest. Her penname was Yukari.

== Early life ==
Tomita was born Teiko Matsui on December 1, 1896 in Osaka, Japan. She was the second of nine children. She began writing tanka when she was in high school. She took on the penname Yukari. After high school, Tomita earned a teaching certificate, and taught in elementary schools until 1920, when she married a farmer named Masakazu Tomita. They had been exchanging letters for two years, but had never met in person. He lived in Wapato, Washington, so Tomita moved to the United States to be with him. They had five children, but one died as a child.

== Career ==
Tomita and her new husband farmed on the Yakima Indian Reservation. However, they lost the lease on the farm soon after Tomita's arrival. Masakazu worked as a foreman at a nursery in Satus. They moved to Sunnydale in 1929. In 1939, Tomita joined a tanka club in Seattle. Some of her poetry was published in Japan.

After the bombing of Pearl Harbor, Tomita burned all of her poetry so that the FBI would not assume that she had any loyalty to Japan. Regardless, she and her family were incarcerated at Tule Lake in California and Heart Mountain in Wyoming as part of the enforcement of Executive Order 9066. After she was released in 1945, Tomita briefly lived in Minnesota, but returned to Seattle after the war and became a seamstress.

In 1967, Tomita was forced to relocate a second time when it was found that her home was in the buffer zone around the Seattle Tacoma Airport. She moved to Seattle.

Despite burning all of her poetry at the beginning of the war, she resumed writing while incarcerated at Tule Lake. She wrote poetry as a way to deal with the situations around her. Some frequent symbols that appeared in her poems include the cherry tree and sagebrush. She wrote poetry for the rest of her life.

Tomita died on March 13, 1990.

== Selected bibliography ==
- Tomita, Teiko (1956). Renia no yuki.
