= Deep Lake (Thurston County, Washington) =

Lake in Thurston County, Washington state

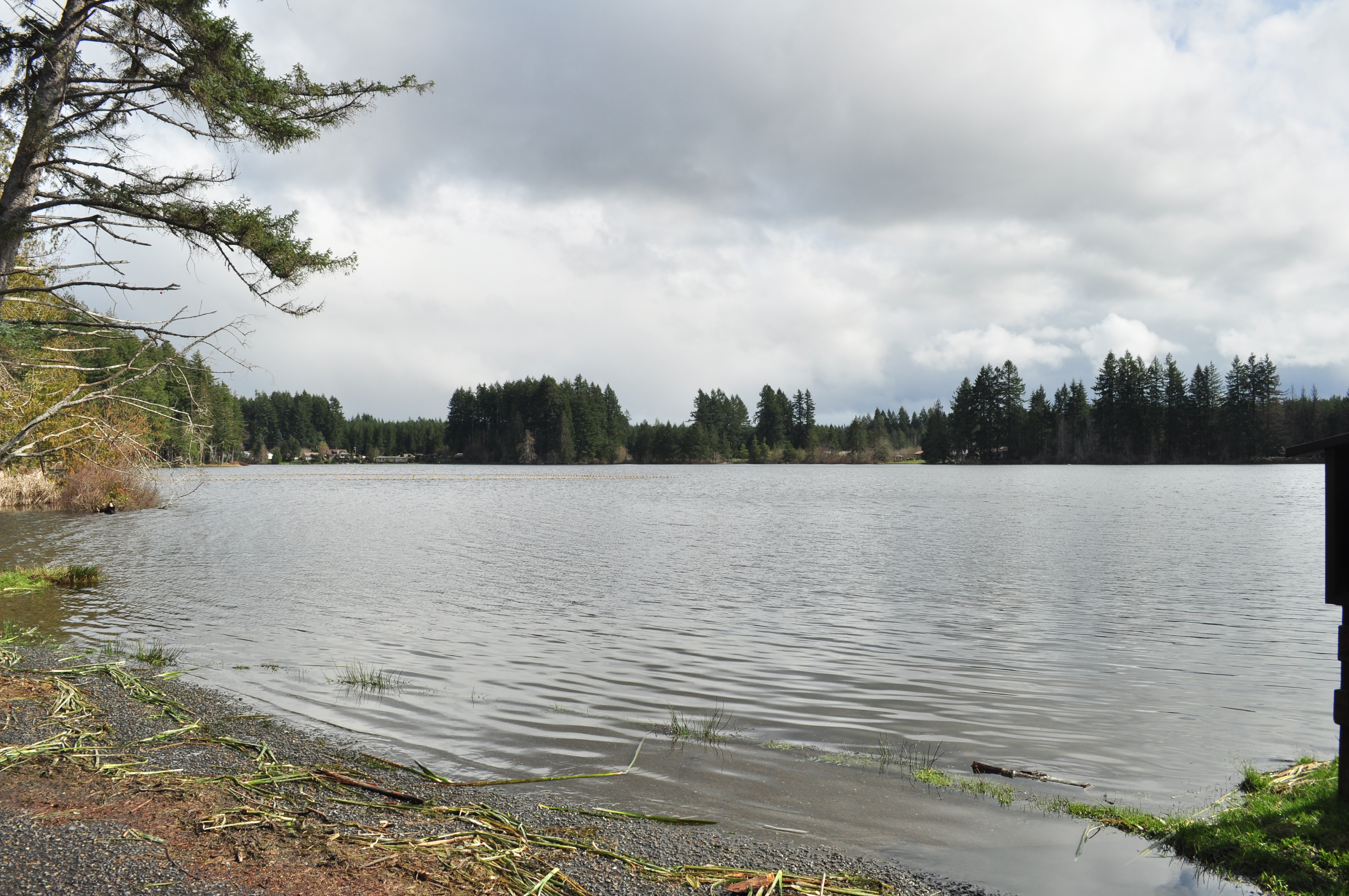
- Deep Lake, 2017
- Location: Thurston County, Washington, United States
- Coordinates: 46°54′27″N 122°54′45″W
- Type: Lake
- Basin countries: United States
- Max. length: 1,439 ft (439 m)
- Max. width: 2,631 ft (802 m)
- Surface area: 66.2 acres (26.8 ha)
- Max. depth: 17 ft (5 m)
- Water volume: 771 acre⋅ft (950,000 m^{3})
- Surface elevation: 197 ft (60 m)
- References: Geographic Names Information System: 1504395

Deep Lake is a 66-acre (27 ha) body of water lying eight miles (13 km) south of Olympia in Thurston County, Washington. It is 17 feet (5.2 m) deep at its deepest point and has a water volume of 771 acre-feet (951,000 m^{3}). The lake drains into Black River by way of Beaver Creek and Scott Lake. Deep Lake is located in Section 3, Township 16N, Range 2W, Willamette. The lake is bordered on two sides by Millersylvania State Park. An RV resort camp occupies the lake's eastern shore. The lake's fish population includes stocked rainbow trout and naturally reproducing largemouth bass, bluegill, yellow perch, and pumpkinseed.

== History ==
The first known name of the lake by white settlers was Deep Lake as noted in a land survey in 1855. However, the lake was referred to as CoKaine Lake in the late 19th century which could have been an early Native American name. For a period of time, the lake went under the name Drake Lake. The name Drake Lake originated from the Lyman Darrow Drake family that settled on the south side of the lake in 1872. The Drake Lake name was still commonly used up until the late 1920s as was evidenced by several US Geological Survey and Metsker Maps dated up to 1929. The Drake family sold their property in 1908.

== See also ==
- List of geographic features in Thurston County, Washington
