= Rignall, Washington =

- Unincorporated community
- Location within Washington (state) Location within the United States
- Coordinates: 47°09′54″N 122°55′22″W
- Country: United States
- State: Washington
- County: Thurston
- Time zone: UTC-8 (Pacific (PST))
  - Summer (DST): UTC-7 (PDT)

Rignall is an unincorporated community in Thurston County, in the U.S. state of Washington. It is located on the Steamboat Island peninsula, overlooking the confluence of the Eld Inlet and Budd Inlet.

== History ==
A post office was in operation at Rignall from 1920 until 1927. The Rignall moniker is most likely derived from the name of a settler.

== Parks and recreation ==
Rignall is south of Hope Island State Park, which is accessible only by water.
