= Munn Lake =

Lake in Thurston County, Washington state

- Location: Thurston County, Washington
- Coordinates: 46°59′06″N 122°52′46″W
- Type: Lake
- Etymology: Edwin Munn
- Surface area: 30 acres (12 ha)
- Max. depth: 19 feet (5.8 m)
- References: Geographic Names Information System: 1506894

Munn Lake is a lake in the U.S. state of Washington. The Olympia Regional Airport lies to the southwest of the lake and the community of Bush is situated to the south. Two other bodies of water in the surrounding area, Susan Lake and Trails End Lake, are in near proximity to Munn Lake.

The lake has a surface area of approximately 30 acres (12 ha) and reaches a depth of 19 feet (5.8 m).

Munn Lake was named after Edwin Munn, a dairy farmer who operated in the area in the early 20th century.

== See also ==
- List of geographic features in Thurston County, Washington
