= McIntosh, Washington =

- Unincorporated community
- Interactive map of McIntosh, Washington
- Coordinates: 46°51′46″N 122°46′39″W
- Country: United States
- State: Washington
- County: Thurston
- Time zone: UTC-8 (Pacific (PST))
  - Summer (DST): UTC-7 (PDT)

McIntosh is an unincorporated community in Thurston County, in the U.S. state of Washington. The community is situated around McIntosh Lake off Washington State Route 507 between the cities of Tenino and Rainer.

== History ==
The community was named in 1889 by Northern Pacific Railroad officials after a local landholder who gave them land in exchange for the naming rights. A post office was in operation at McIntosh from 1904 until 1928.
