= Pioneer Park (Washington) =

Park in Tumwater, Washington

- Location within Washington (state)
- Type: Community park
- Location: 5801 Henderson Blvd SE, Tumwater, Washington
- Coordinates: 46°59′47″N 122°53′06″W
- Area: 85 acres (34 ha)
- Owner: City of Tumwater
- Status: Open
- Camp sites: None
- Hiking trails: 1.5 miles (2.4 km)
- Paths: Paved, rock
- Terrain: Flat
- Habitats: Meadows, riparian
- Water: Deschutes River
- Plants: Deciduous forest, conifers
- Parking: Parking lot, bicycle racks
- Facilities: Restrooms
- Website: City of Tumwater Parks and Trails

Pioneer Park is a community park located in Tumwater, Washington, on the Deschutes River.

== History ==
Due to age, deterioration, and no longer meeting safety standards, structures in the park's main playground area were removed in 2025.

== Geography ==
Pioneer Park is located in Tumwater, Washington off Henderson Boulevard. The Deschutes River provides the site's western and southern borders.

== Amenities and features ==
The park is approximately 85 acres (34 ha) and is equipped for a variety of court and field sports; visitors can also access the Deschutes River. (Note: The Deschutes River, originally given the name, "Riviere des Chutes" by French fur traders, is translated as "River of the Falls".) The park's terrain is flat and contains a wheelchair accessible, partially paved loop trail covering 1.5 miles (2.4 km). There is a main playground area, a separate playground featuring a swing set and monkey bars, and several picnic locations.

The park is separated by a large parking lot; most trails are located in the southern parcel and athletic fields are to the north.

== Sports and events ==
Pioneer Park is used as a primary viewing location from which to watch firework displays during the city of Tumwater's July 4th celebrations.

== Environment and ecology ==
The grounds near the Deschutes River are considered a riparian habitat and contains a meadow and a deciduous forest interspersed with conifers. After a fish ladder was removed near Tumwater Falls in 1954, salmon had begun to respawn in the river.

The meadow area and shoreline of the river were replanted with native shrubs and trees around 2007. The efforts were undertaken to provide shade to the river, leading to an improved salmon habitat.

In 2021, the city of Tumwater, in partnership with the Washington Department of Ecology (WADOE), agreed to spend $450,000 to redesign and stabilize the park's shoreline, which contributes sediment into the Deschutes River, harming coho salmon. The first phase of the project included the planting of native vegetation and "riparian trees". A tree survey followed the next year, which included an inventory, evaluation, and recommendation report on existing trees near the river; a study to assess the project's affects on 27 species of wildlife was also undertaken. A second part of the partnership effort includes stabilization of the river's shoreline and is expected to be completed in 2027.
