= Skookumchuck, Thurston County, Washington =

Skookumchuck, Washington
- Populated place
- Location within Washington (state) Location within the United States
- Coordinates: 46°54′19″N 122°46′15″W
- Country: United States
- State: Washington
- County: Thurston
- Time zone: UTC-8 (Pacific (PST))
  - Summer (DST): UTC-7 (PDT)

Skookumchuck is a populated place in Thurston County, Washington. It is located east of Offutt Lake and northwest of Rainier. The Chehalis Western Trail passes through the community.
