= Sunnydale, Washington =

- Unincorporated community
- Location within Washington (state) Location within the United States
- Coordinates: 46.8337112°N 122.9329120°W
- Country: United States
- State: Washington
- County: Thurston
- Time zone: UTC-8 (Pacific (PST))
  - Summer (DST): UTC-7 (PDT)

Sunnydale is an unincorporated community in Thurston County, in the U.S. state of Washington. The community is situated on Old Highway 99 between Grand Mound and Tenino.

== History ==
Sunnydale took its name from a nearby poultry farm.

== Parks and recreation ==
Millersylvania State Park is north of the area, and Sunnydale lies east of the Scatter Creek Wildlife Recreation Area.
