= Monarch Contemporary Art Center and Sculpture Park =

Sculpture park in Thurston County, Washington

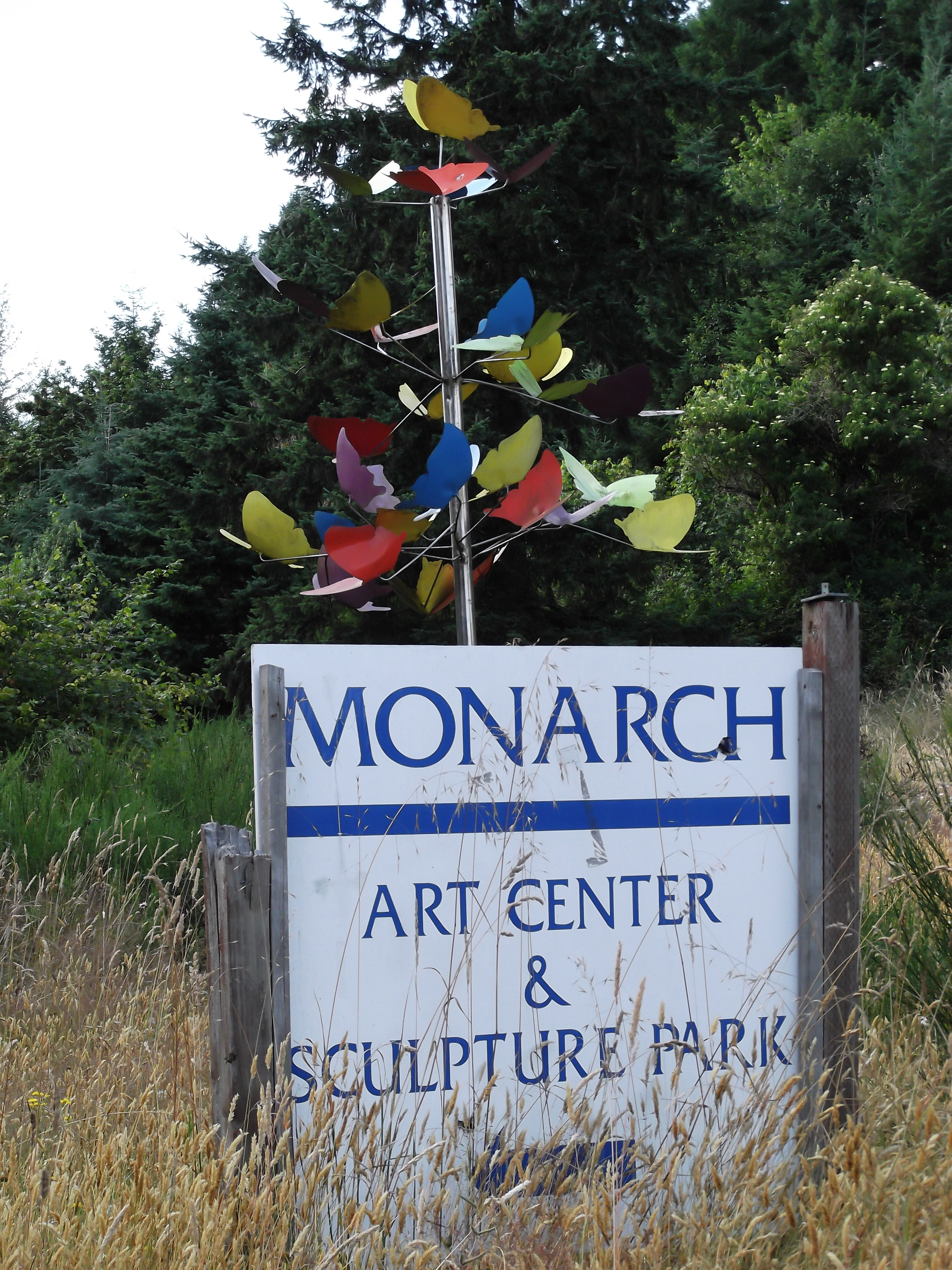

- Location within Washington (state)
- Established: June 1998
- Location: Thurston County, Washington, US
- Coordinates: 46°54′05″N 122°45′45″W
- Type: Sculpture garden, art gallery
- Collection size: 160 sculptures
- Owner: Myrna Orsini
- Parking: Limited, trail access
- Website: www.monarchsculpturepark.org

Monarch Contemporary Art Center and Sculpture Park is a free, outdoor art gallery located along the Chehalis Western Trail near Tenino, in southern Thurston County, Washington, United States. Opened in 1998 by sculptor Myrna Orsini, the 5-acre (2.0 ha) park features sculpture gardens. Under threat of closures in the 2010s, the grounds are considered a primitive park.

== History ==
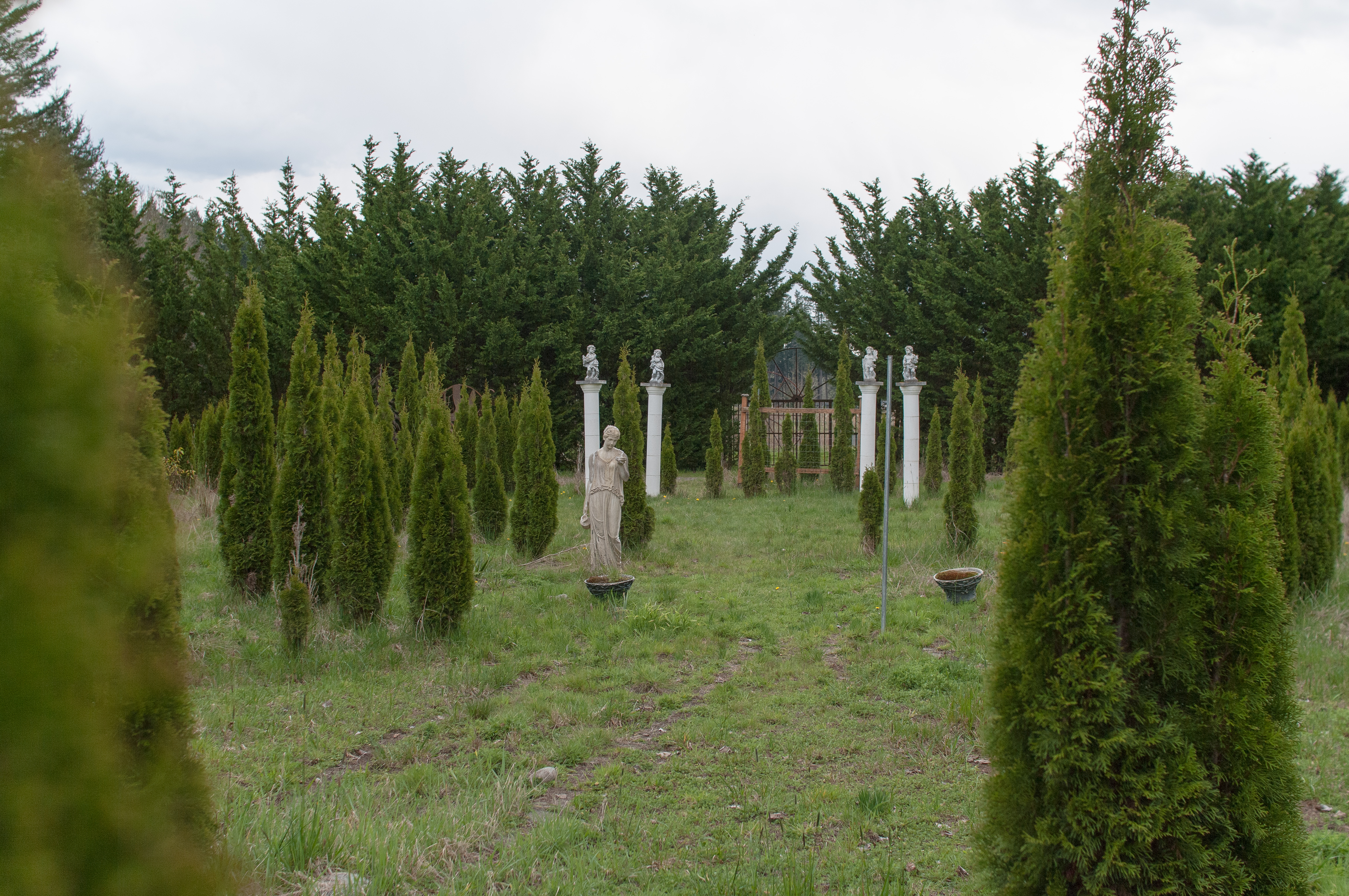
Sculpture Park exhibition in 2015

In 1992, after visiting an art symposia in Europe, founder Myrna Orsini and her business partner Doris Coonrod purchased land totaling 68 acres (28 ha) for the park; an additional parcel for a shop was purchased two years later. The nonprofit park is north of the towns of Tenino and Rainer and is situated next to the Chehalis Western Trail, a rail trail that courses north-to-south in Thurston County. The park has been opened since June 1998 as "a gift to the community". The opening commenced with a rock-carving symposium which was attended by 13 artists who came from nine countries, including Lithuania, Austria, Cuba, Italy, and Canada; each artist donated a piece to the park's collection.

Coonrod died in 2008 due to Alzheimer's disease and by mid-2011, the nonprofit park was set to close due to health, maintenance, and financial concerns; the property was placed for sale. By July, the month the site was to shutter, the park was able to remain open after liability insurance funding, as well as maintenance volunteers, was organized by a local group of leaders and the Woodland Trail Greenway Association.

After being closed temporarily beginning in 2012 due to issues regarding parking and bathroom facilities, the park reopened in 2017 as a primitive park and the site is listed as 5 acres (2.0 ha) in size.

== Description ==
During the Monarch's peak, it was listed at 80 acres (32 ha) and there were several distinct areas within the park, including a fantasy garden, a butterfly garden, a maze, and an interactive sound-sculpture area set in the partially forested countryside. There was an indoor gallery and by 2006, over 100 sculptures were listed as being featured at the Monarch.

By 2009, Monarch had established a permanent collection of 28 works, many of which were donated by their creators, and also featured 87 other works on consignment. The park exhibits the work of artists from around the world. Local contributors include Valentine Welman, Justin Hahn, Tom Yody, and Orsini; international artists such as Urs Twellmann and Doug Neil have also displayed their work at the park. The park also has hosted visiting artists like Pat Warner.

== Events ==
In the past, the park hosted workshops and classes promoting art creation. It also hosted open houses called "Art in the Park," which are biennial exhibitions where local artists display and sell their work; these events feature live music, dancing, and art.

== Artworks ==
Guests are greeted at the entrance to a welded sculpture of bicycle parts and the stone works created at the opening are situated on the main path to the studio. A popular piece at the park is the "Prayer Tree", an interactive piece where visitors can hang prayer messages. Another work, known as "The Portal", creates a large boom sound during changes in temperature. A hedge maze in the shape of a butterfly, one of six in the world of such type, existed on the grounds.

As of 2025, the Monarch Contemporary Art Center and Sculpture Park contains 160 sculptures.
