= McIntosh Lake (Washington) =

Lake in Thurston County, Washington state

- Location: Thurston County, Washington
- Coordinates: 46°52′03″N 122°46′00″W
- Etymology: After McIntosh, Washington
- Basin countries: United States
- Surface area: 116 acres (47 ha)
- Max. depth: 11 ft (3.4 m)
- References: Geographic Names Information System: 1506571

McIntosh Lake is a lake in the U.S. state of Washington. The lake has a surface area of 116 acres (47 ha), and reaches a depth of 11 feet (3.4 m).

McIntosh Lake takes its name from the adjacent community of McIntosh.

== See also ==
- List of geographic features in Thurston County, Washington
