= Deschutes River (Washington) =

River in Lewis and Thurston counties, Washington state

Deschutes River Rivière des Chutes; River of the Falls
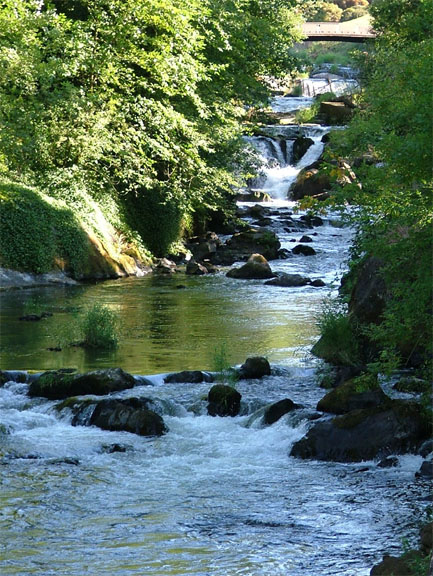
- Tumwater Falls of the Deschutes River, 2005
- Interactive map of River location

Location
- Country: United States
- State: Washington
- County: Thurston, Lewis

Physical characteristics
- Source: Cascade Range
  - coordinates: 46°41′0″N 122°26′17″W
- Mouth: Puget Sound
  - coordinates: 47°1′6″N 122°54′13″W
- Length: 50 mi (80 km)
- Basin size: 162 sq mi (420 km^{2})
- Discharge
  - location: river mile 2.4 at Tumwater
  - average: 396 cu ft/s (11.2 m^{3}/s)
  - minimum: 48 cu ft/s (1.4 m^{3}/s)
  - maximum: 8,150 cu ft/s (231 m^{3}/s)

Basin features
- GNIS feature ID: 1518684

The Deschutes River is a 50-mile-long (80 km) river in the U.S. state of Washington. The river's course begins in Lewis County. The waterway ends at Budd Inlet where it empties into Puget Sound.

== Etymology ==
The river was given its name by French fur traders from the Hudson's Bay Company, who called it Rivière des Chutes, or "River of the Falls", a translation of the First Nations name for the site. The city of Tumwater, founded in the same location, takes its name from the Chinook Jargon translation for "waterfall".

== History ==
In 2025, the river received over $775,000 in funding for a two-project salmon restoration habitat effort to be led by the South Puget Sound Salmon Enhancement Group. Funding was provided by the Washington State Salmon Recovery Funding Board and Puget Sound Partnership. The projects include efforts to improve floodplain, habitat, and riverbank concerns of the middle river's basin located north of Tenino, and the installation of natural logjams in the upper Deschutes and its tributary, Mitchell Creek.

== Course ==
The headwaters are in the Bald Hills in Lewis County, and it empties into Budd Inlet of Puget Sound at Olympia in Thurston County.

Tributaries of the river include Spurgeon Creek, Thurston Creek and Lake Lawrence.

== Recreation ==
There are numerous parks along its course, including Pioneer Park and Tumwater Falls Park. A popular tubing stretch runs from Pioneer Park to Tumwater Falls.

The Chehalis Western Trail parallels the river for a stretch of 2 miles (3.2 km), allowing users direct access to the river.

== See also ==
- List of geographic features in Lewis County, Washington
- List of geographic features in Thurston County, Washington
- List of rivers of Washington (state)
