= East Olympia, Washington =

Unincorporated community in Washington, United States

- Unincorporated community
- Interactive map of East Olympia, Washington
- Coordinates: 46°58′03″N 122°50′08″W
- Country: United States
- State: Washington
- County: Thurston
- Elevation: 220 ft (67 m)
- Time zone: UTC-8 (Pacific (PST))
  - Summer (DST): UTC-7 (PDT)
- ZIP Code: 98540
- Area code(s): 360, 564
- GNIS feature ID: 1504649

East Olympia is an unincorporated community in Thurston County, Washington, United States. The community is 6 miles (9.7 km) south-southeast of downtown Olympia.

== History ==
The Olympia area's station on Amtrak's Coast Starlight line was located in East Olympia before it moved to Lacey in 1994.

Rural lands immediately southeast of the community were under consideration, beginning in 2022, for a proposed new airport to "help meet commercial and cargo demand" for Washington state.

== Climate ==
This region experiences warm (but not hot) and dry summers, with no average monthly temperatures above 71.6 °F. According to the Köppen Climate Classification system, East Olympia has a warm-summer Mediterranean climate, abbreviated "Csb" on climate maps.
