= Vail, Washington =

- Unincorporated community
- Location within Washington (state) Location within the United States
- Coordinates: 46°50′42″N 122°39′22″W
- Country: United States
- State: Washington
- County: Thurston
- Elevation: 430 ft (130 m)

Population (2020)
  - Total: 1,795
- Time zone: UTC-8 (Pacific (PST))
  - Summer (DST): UTC-7 (PDT)
- GNIS feature ID: 1527655

Vail is an unincorporated community in Thurston County, in the U.S. state of Washington. The community lies south of Rainier and Washington State Route 507.

== History ==
The community was named after William Vail, the original owner of the town site. The Weyerhaeuser Timber Company established Vail in 1927 as a company town, and the population peaked at about 600, but by 1969 only ten houses remained.

A post office was in operation at Vail from 1930 until 1963.

== See also ==
- List of ghost towns in Washington
