= Tumwater Falls =

Waterfall in Tumwater, Washington, U.S.

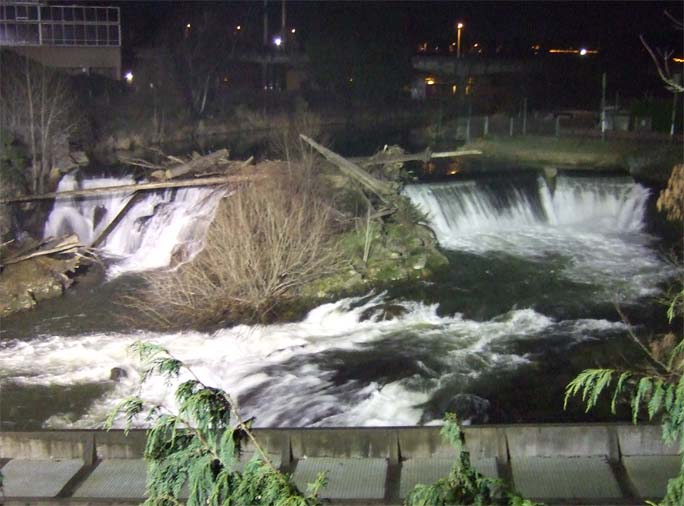
- Upper Tumwater Falls, 2007
- Interactive map of Tumwater Falls
- Location: Tumwater, Washington, U.S.
- Coordinates: 47.0147°N 122.9046°W
- Total height: 82 ft (25 m)
- Number of drops: 2
- Longest drop: 25 ft (7.6 m)
- Watercourse: Deschutes River
- Average flow rate: 400 cu ft/s (11 m^{3}/s)

The Tumwater Falls are a series of cascades on the Deschutes River in Tumwater, Washington, United States. They are located near where the river empties into Budd Inlet, a southerly arm of Puget Sound in Olympia.

== Geology ==
The Deschutes River carved a course through glacial debris left after the Pleistocene ice age until it reached volcanic bedrock, forming the falls as it coursed down to Puget Sound.

== History ==
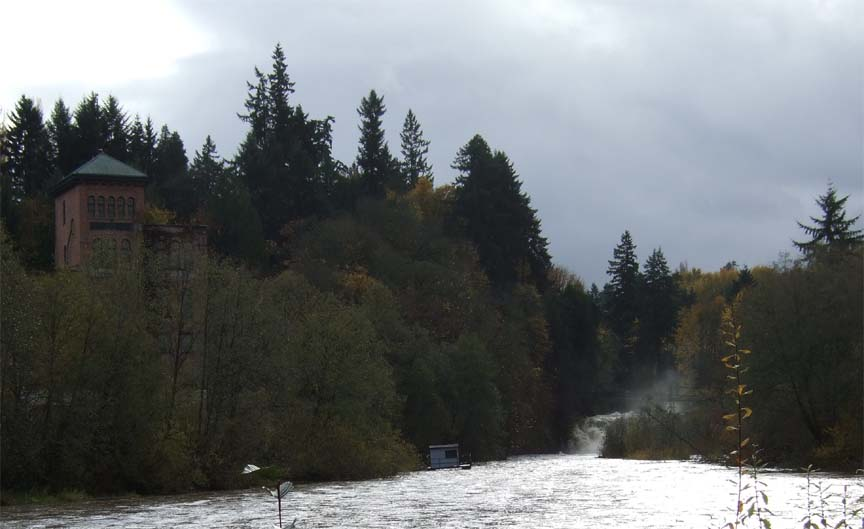
Lower Tumwater Falls emptying into Capitol Lake adjacent to the old Olympia Brewery, 2006

Tumwater Falls was the site of New Market, the first European settlement in Western Washington. It was also the site of the now-defunct Olympia Brewing Company. A footbridge across the falls was constructed in the 1860s, and the current bridge dates to around 1890.

Olympia Light and Power Company constructed a dam and a hydroelectric power plant at the falls in 1890, a decade before the Snoqualmie Falls powerplant outside Seattle. The plant powered an Olympia–Tumwater streetcar, among other things. A dam at 82 feet (25 m) above sea level created a head for the powerhouse and still stands on the Deschutes River.

The Tumwater Falls created an impassable barrier to salmon until 1952, when a fish ladder was built by the Washington Department of Fisheries (now the Washington State Department of Fish and Wildlife), to provide salmon access to the newly constructed fish hatchery located immediately above the falls. Prior to the 1952 hatchery operations, the Deschutes river above the Tumwater Falls lacked a natural salmon run.

In 1962, Olympia Brewing Company donated 15 acres (6.1 ha) of land surrounding the falls to the Olympia-Tumwater Foundation, and Tumwater Falls Park was created. The park receives 200,000 visitors annually.

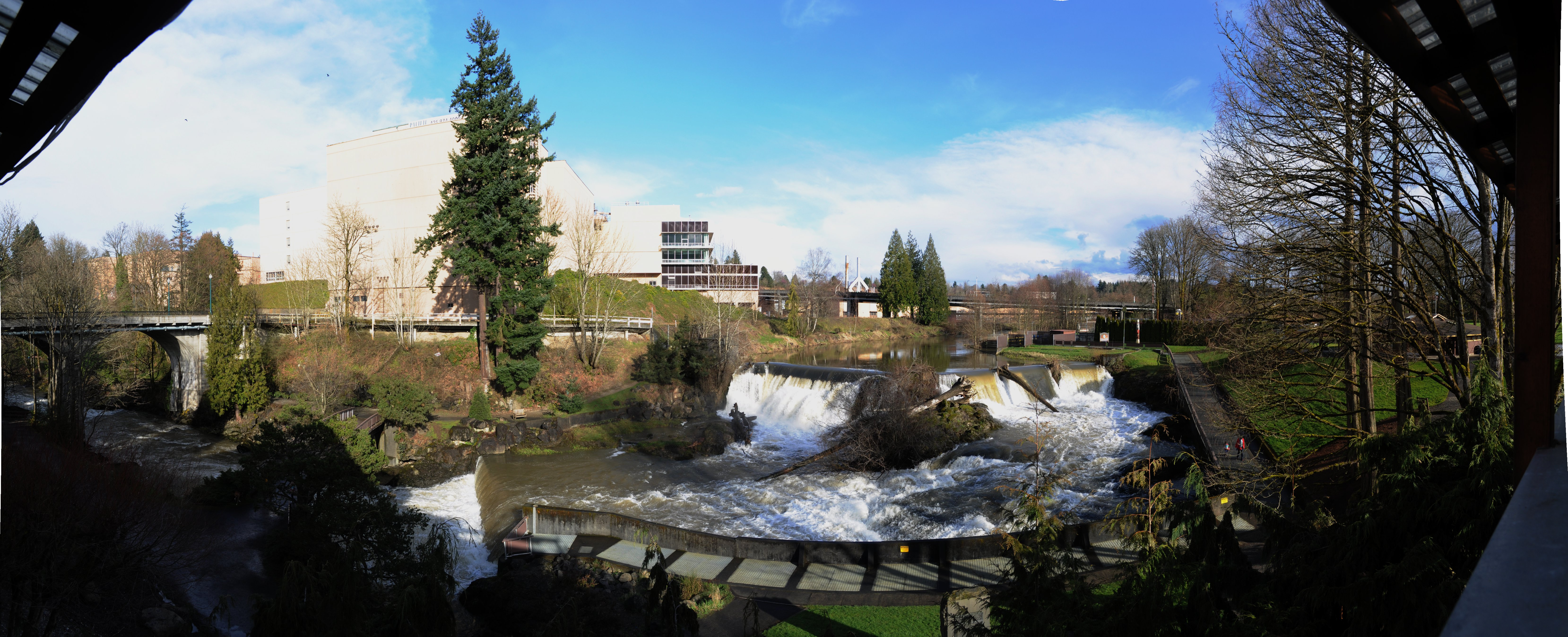
Upper falls from Tumwater Falls Park, 2011

== See also ==
- History of Olympia
- List of geographic features in Thurston County, Washington
- List of parks and recreation in Thurston County, Washington
