= Millersylvania State Park =

State park in Thurston County, Washington, United States

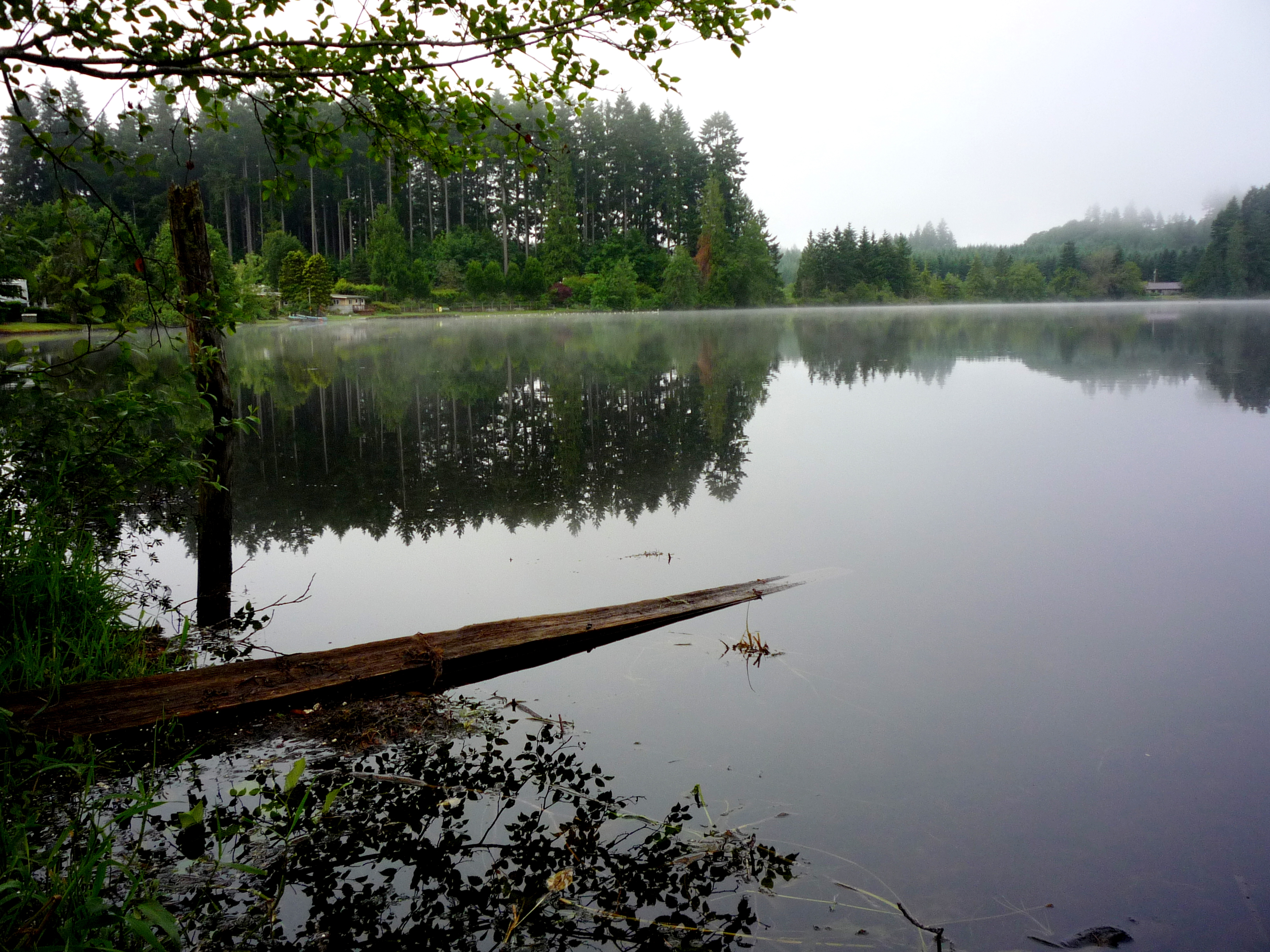

- Location within Washington (state) Location within the United States
- Location: Thurston County, Washington, United States
- Coordinates: 46°54′27″N 122°54′45″W
- Area: 903 acres (365 ha)
- Elevation: 200 ft (61 m)
- Established: 1921
- Administrator: Washington State Parks and Recreation Commission
- Visitors: 558,018 (in 2024)
- Website: Official website
- Millersylvania State Park
- U.S. National Register of Historic Places
- Location: 12245 Tilley Road, Olympia, Washington
- Area: 842 acres (341 ha)
- Architect: Civilian Conservation Corps; Ebmeier, Ernest & Ellsworth Storey
- Architectural style: Bungalow/Craftsman
- NRHP reference No.: 09000732
- Added to NRHP: September 16, 2009

Millersylvania State Park is a public recreation area located on Deep Lake eight miles (13 km) south of Olympia, Washington. The state park's 903 acres (365 ha) include old-growth cedar and fir trees as well as 3,300 feet (1,000 m) of freshwater shoreline. In 2009, the park was listed on the National Register of Historic Places in recognition of its well-preserved Civilian Conservation Corps landscape. It is managed by the Washington State Parks and Recreation Commission.

== History ==
The area was homesteaded by Squire Lathum in 1855 and then was sold to John Miller. The Miller family called the area Miller's Glade, before changing it Millersylvania and giving the property to the state in 1921 for perpetual use as a park. Remnants of a narrow-gauge railway, 19th-century skid roads, and other reminders of the logging industry can be found on park grounds, including tree stumps bearing the scars of springboards used by loggers.

The grounds contained a body of water known as Deep Lake and the area was both forested and swampland. The park's construction began as early as mid-1933 under the Civilian Conservation Corps (CCC), Company 1232. The park was considered complete by July 1935. The CCC constructed buildings, trails, roads, picnic shelters, bathhouses, and a caretaker's home, most of which remain intact and in use.

A total of 51 Black workers, also known as enrollees, were part of the CCC company build of Millersylvania beginning in May 1934. In a visit by the Washington State Parks and Recreation Commission superintendent at the time, William G. Weigle, he found the presence of Black men, "unfortunate". A committee was formed from his report to find an avenue to regulate the "negro situation" and a letter was written to the United States Congress requesting intentional segregation. The men were assigned to work in the camp kitchen and prevented from participating in construction of the park. A separate beach at Deep Lake was ordered for use of Black enrollees so the men could bathe in a manner preventing them from coming into contact with park visitors. Similar, but less strict instances existed during the same time for Black workers at Rainbow Falls State Park near Dryad. The Black employees, given the moniker, the "Cotton Club", were reassigned after their first six-month term of service following a CCC directive that no Black employees were allowed to work outside the borders of their own states; the edict officially introduced a segregation mandate. At their leave, the Black enrollees were commended for their athletic, food service, and social talents. No mention of their physical labors, construction skills, or the segregation were noted.

The park was temporarily closed in late January 2024 after a forced-entry incident at the area's reservoir. The water was tested for poisoning and contaminants though the parks department did not suspect there was tampering of the water system.

== Activities and amenities ==
The park is situated in an old-growth forest and offers camping, 16 miles (26 km) of hiking and biking trails, boating, and fishing. The site contains two swimming beaches located on Deep Lake, which sits on the southern border of the area. Millersylvania was once reportedly home to a rare species of freshwater crab, as reported in the Miller family diaries, which became extinct due to overfishing by new settlers coming from the east.

== See also ==
- List of parks and recreation in Thurston County, Washington
