= Thurston County, Washington =

County in Washington, United States

- County
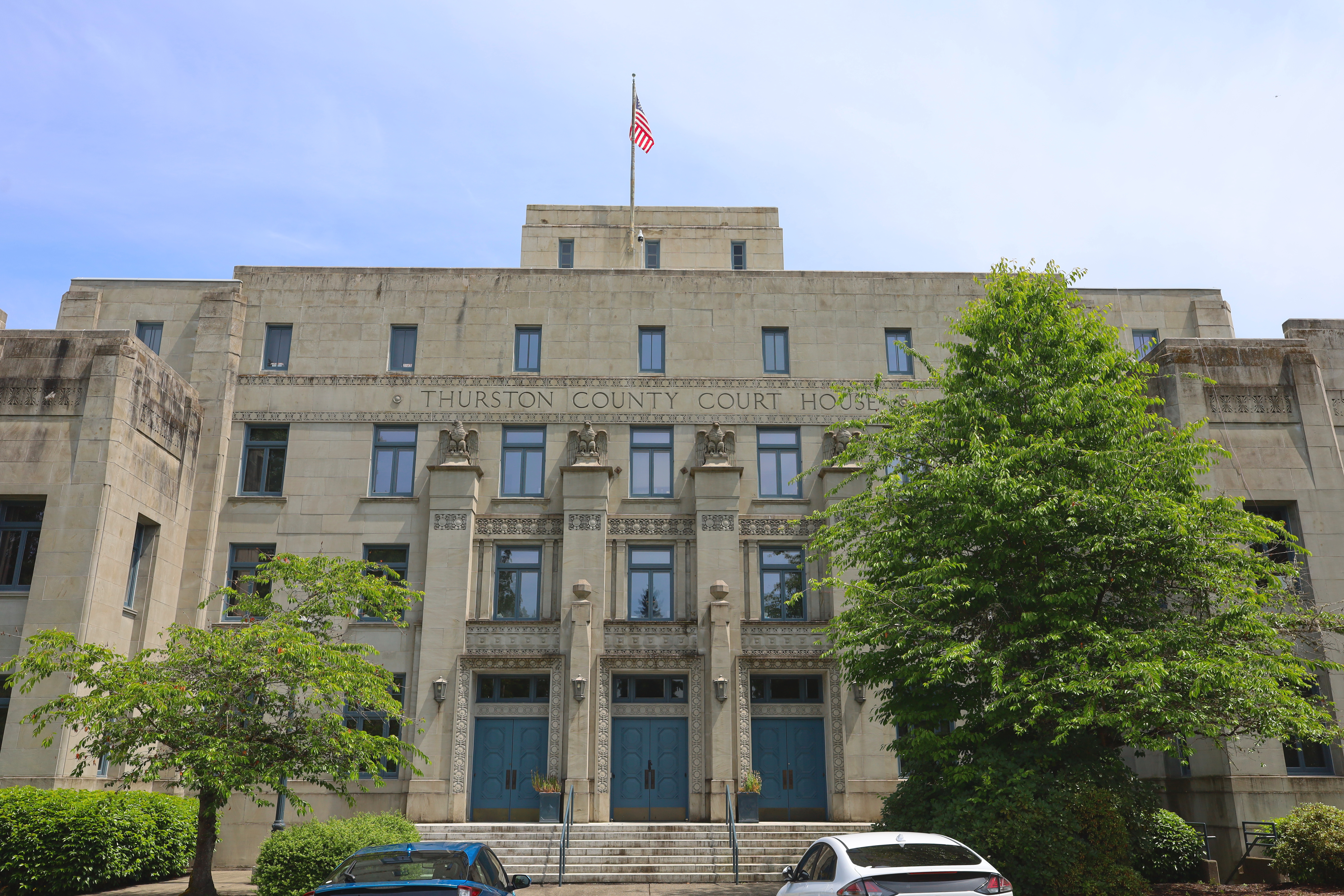
- Former Thurston County Courthouse in summer 2025

- Logo

- Location within the U.S. state of Washington
- Coordinates: 46°56′N 122°50′W
- Country: United States
- State: Washington
- Founded: January 12, 1852
- Named for: Samuel Thurston
- Seat: Olympia
- Largest city: Lacey

Government
  - County Manager: Leonard Hernandez

Area
  - Total: 774 sq mi (2,000 km^{2})
  - Land: 722 sq mi (1,870 km^{2})
  - Water: 52 sq mi (130 km^{2}) 6.7%

Population (2020)
  - Total: 294,793
  - Estimate (2025): 304,261 ▲
  - Density: 408/sq mi (158/km^{2})
- Time zone: UTC−8 (Pacific)
  - Summer (DST): UTC−7 (PDT)
- Congressional districts: 3rd, 10th
- Website: www.thurstoncountywa.gov

Thurston County is a county located in the U.S. state of Washington. As of the 2020 census, its population was 294,793. The county seat is Olympia, the state capital.

Thurston County was created out of Lewis County by the government of Oregon Territory on January 12, 1852. At that time, it covered all of the Puget Sound region and the Olympic Peninsula. On December 22 of the same year, Pierce, King, Island, and Jefferson counties were split off from Thurston County. It is named after Samuel R. Thurston, the Oregon Territory's first delegate to Congress. Today, the county includes the southernmost part of the South Puget Sound and areas south along the I-5 corridor.

Thurston County comprises the Olympia–Lacey–Tumwater, WA Metropolitan Statistical Area and is included in the Seattle–Tacoma, WA Combined Statistical Area.

== History ==
The southern end of Puget Sound is the homeland of several indigenous Coast Salish groups, including the Nisqually, Squaxin, and Upper Chehalis. Archeological remains at Tumwater Falls date back to 2,500 to 3,000 years before present; the area around the falls included a settlement with several longhouses. The first European exhibition to the southern Puget Sound was conducted by Peter Puget and Joseph Whidbey on the British-led Vancouver Expedition in May 1792. The Hudson's Bay Company established a trading post at Fort Nisqually in 1833 on the east side of the Nisqually Delta while the Oregon Country was under joint administration by the British and American governments. Permanent European (and later American) settlement of modern-day Thurston County began with the arrival of a pioneer party led by Michael Simmons and Black pioneer George Bush in 1845. Several families settled near Tumwater Falls at a site they named "New Market", which became the first European settlement in Western Washington.

The area north of the Columbia River was originally under the jurisdiction of the Vancouver District (later renamed Clark County) until 1845, when Lewis County was created from the area west of the Cowlitz River. The entire region was ceded to the United States with the signing of the Oregon Treaty in 1846 and organized into Oregon Territory two years later. A petition by 54 residents of Olympia and surrounding communities was submitted to the Oregon Territorial Legislature in December 1851 to create a new county from Lewis County. The proposed name of Simmons County, named for Michael Simmons, was changed to Thurston County by the legislature at the suggestion of Asa Lovejoy to honor Samuel Thurston, the first delegate to the U.S. Congress from Oregon Territory. Thurston himself had never visited the area.

Thurston County was created on January 12, 1852, by the Oregon Territorial Legislature and Olympia was designated as its seat. It included the entire Olympic Peninsula and Puget Sound region up to the northern border with British North America and went as far east as the Cascade Mountains. On December 22, the northern areas of Thurston County were divided to form Island, Jefferson, King, and Pierce counties. A portion of the county south of the Chehalis River was ceded to Lewis County in February 1853, a month before Washington Territory was created with its capital in Olympia. Sawamish County (now Mason County) was created in March 1854 from the northwestern portions of Thurston County and Chehalis County (now Grays Harbor County) was established a month later from the remaining western half of Thurston County. Several exchanges of land between Thurston and neighboring counties were made during the 1860s and settled into the modern boundaries by 1873. An attempt to move the county seat from Olympia to Tumwater or West Olympia was defeated by voters in 1861.

Olympia was retained as capital of Washington after it was granted statehood in 1889; the city did not win a majority in the first referendum after Ellensburg and North Yakima, but defeated both in a second vote. Local residents built a branch line to connect with the Northern Pacific Railroad and approved a harbor-dredging operation to promote Olympia as a trade hub as the area fell behind Seattle and Tacoma in population growth.

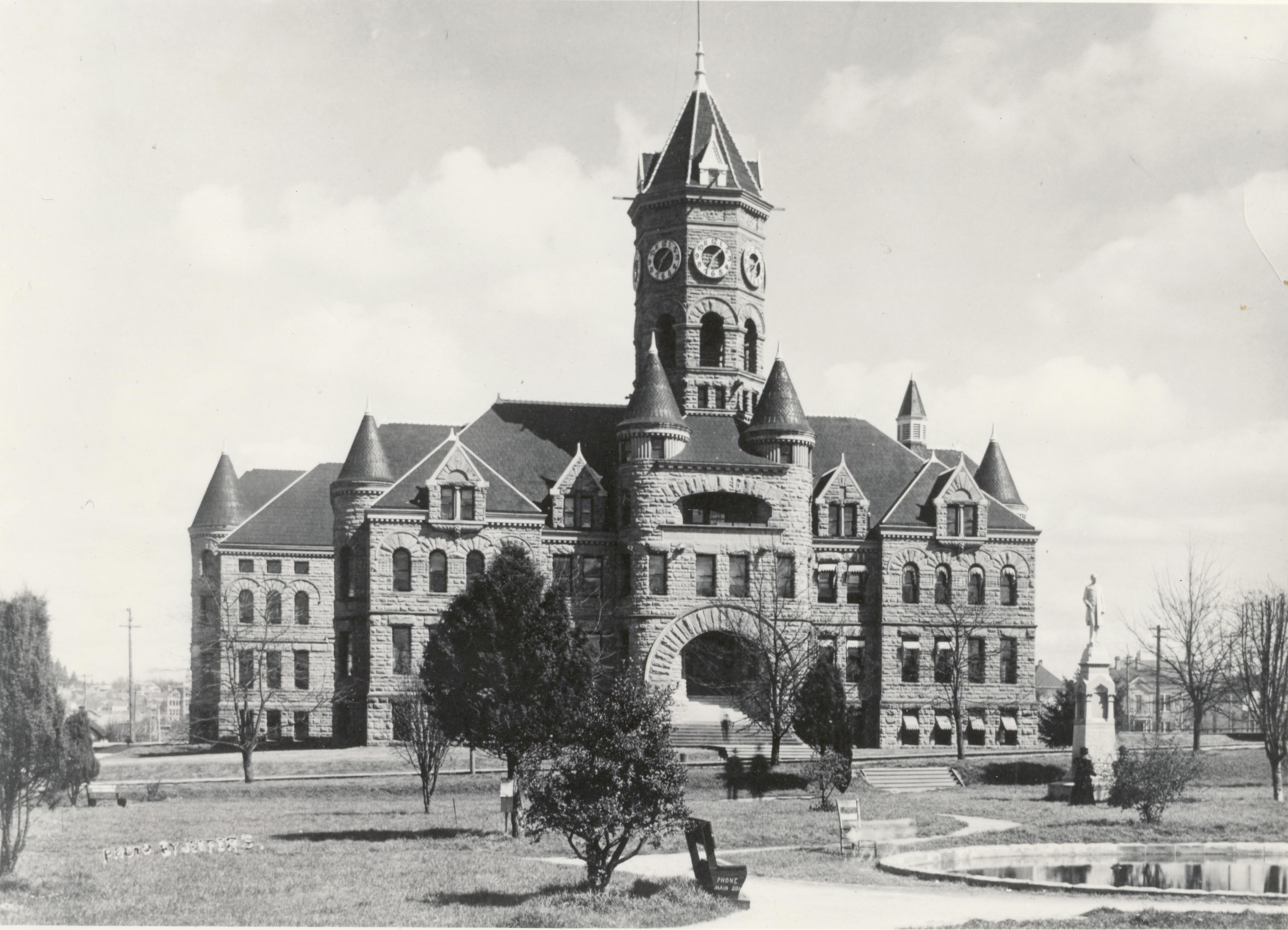
Old Capitol Building in Olympia.

The 150-foot (46 m) Old Capitol Building was completed in 1892 and was purchased by the state government in 1901 for use to replace a temporary wooden structure built in 1856. The modern Washington State Capitol commenced construction in 1923 and was completed in 1928 alongside a campus of government buildings and monuments. Thurston County remained predominantly dependent on the logging industry until the state government became the county's largest employment sector in the 1950s. Several state government agencies had attempted to move their offices to Seattle until a 1954 Washington Supreme Court ruling mandated that their headquarters remain in the Olympia area.

The first section of Interstate 5 built in Thurston County was the 6.5-mile (10.5 km) Olympia Freeway, which opened in December 1958 to bypass the city's downtown. Other sections opened over the following decade, extending access through Lacey and Tumwater, where it destroyed portions of the historic downtown; a proposal to build the freeway further away from Olympia was rejected to preserve rural areas. The completion of Interstate 5 enabled the growth of bedroom communities around Thurston County, which saw its population rapidly increase from the 1950s to 1970s. The first suburban shopping center in the county, the South Sound Center in Lacey, opened in October 1966; it was followed by Lacey's incorporation as a city. The Evergreen State College, a public liberal arts college in western Olympia, opened in 1972.

Thurston County, like many of the other counties in Western Washington, has a racially restrictive past. Racial segregation in Washington was different from the well-known accounts of Southern segregation during the Jim Crow era. While Southern states required racial segregation in public facilities by law, much of the racial segregation in Washington was accomplished through racial restrictive covenants which were legally binding agreements between private parties. These covenants were often included in property deeds between individual buyers and sellers, who agreed to never sell the property to specified racial or religious groups. In some cases, large groups of property owners would come together to implement racial restrictive covenants on entire subdivisions or neighborhoods, which are called petitions. In Thurston County specifically, many covenants excluded any Black, mixed race, Chinese, Japanese, or Indian individuals from purchasing, renting, leasing, or occupying specified properties. In rarer cases, Italians and Jewish individuals were also excluded from homeownership. The late 1930s to the early 1950s saw the largest number of racial restrictive covenants enacted. This history of segregation has had generational effects that are still felt today as people of color were systematically denied the ability to purchase homes and in turn were denied the ability to accrue generational wealth that comes with owning a home.

== Geography ==
According to the United States Census Bureau, the county has a total area of 774 square miles (2,000 km^{2}), of which 722 square miles (1,870 km^{2}) is land and 52 square miles (130 km^{2}) (6.7%) is water.

=== Adjacent counties ===
- Pierce County – northeast
- Lewis County – south
- Grays Harbor County – west
- Mason County – north/northwest

=== Major highways ===
- Interstate 5
- U.S. 12
- U.S. 101
- SR 8
- SR 507
- SR 510

=== Geographic features ===
Major watersheds: Black River, Budd/Deschutes, Chehalis River, Eld Inlet, Henderson Inlet, Nisqually River, Skookumchuck River, Totten Inlet and West Capitol Forest.

- Alder Lake
- Bald Hill Lake
- Barnes Lake
- Bass Lake
- Bigelow Lake
- Black Lake
- Black River
- Budd Inlet
- Capitol Lake
- Capitol Peak
- Capitol State Forest
- Chambers Lake
- Chehalis River
- Clear Lake
- Deep Lake
- Deschutes River
- Elbow Lake
- Eld Inlet
- Fifteen Lake
- Gehrke Lake
- Grass Lake
- Henderson Inlet
- Hewitt Lake
- Hicks Lake
- Lake Lawrence
- Lake Lois
- Libby Creek
- Long Lake
- McIntosh Lake
- Mima Mounds
- Munn Lake
- Nisqually River
- Offut Lake
- Patterson Lake
- Puget Sound
- Reichel Lake
- Rocky Prairie
- Saint Clair Lake
- Scott Lake
- Simmons Lake
- Skookumchuck River
- Smith Lake
- Southwick Lake
- Springer Lake
- Summit Lake
- Susan Lake
- Totten Inlet
- Trails End Lake
- Trosper Lake
- Ward Lake

=== National protected areas ===
- Nisqually National Wildlife Refuge

=== Ecology and environment ===
The habitat for the Golden Paintbrush (Castilleja levisecta) runs through the county. The plant was placed on the Endangered Species list in 1997 but due to conservation efforts the 12 in (30 cm) tall prairie flower was delisted in 2023.

Wildlife and land preserves in South Thurston County include the Black River Habitat Management Area, the Glacial Heritage Preserve, and the Scatter Creek Wildlife Area.

== Economy ==
=== Employment ===
As of June 2025, Thurston County had 133,300 non-farm jobs and an unemployment rate of 3.5% (without adjustments for seasonal labor); there was a total of 4,983 unemployed individuals.

The mean hourly wage in the Olympia-Lacey-Tumwater metropolitan statistical area across all non-farm occupations was $35.18 in May 2024, which is above the national average of $32.66.

As of December 2023, Thurston County had 143,640 employed individuals; the county's top employers were:

Rank	Employer	Employees in 2023	Employees in 2014	2023 Share	2014 Share
1	State Government, including Education	▲28,700	23,896	▼19.98%	20.42%
2	Local Government, including Education	▲12,700	11,910	▼8.84%	10.18%
3	Providence Health & Services	▲2,600	1,600	▲1.81%	1.37%
4	Albertsons/Safeway	▲1,200	876	▲0.84%	0.75%
5	Walmart	▲1,100	1,023	▼0.77%	0.87%
6	Lucky Eagle Casino	▲1,000	600	▲0.70%	0.51%
7	Federal Government	▲900	862	▼0.63%	0.74%
8	Nisqually Red Wind Casino	▲700	600	▼0.49%	0.51%
9	South Sound YMCA	▲550	-	▲0.38%	0%
10	Continuum Global Solutions	▲500	-	▲0.35%	0%
10	Fred Meyer	▲500	-	▲0.35%	0%
10	Great Wolf Lodge	▲500	-	▲0.35%	0%
10	Northwest Cannabis Solutions	▲500	-	▲0.35%	0%

=== Tourism ===
In 2024, the county was visited by 3.39 million people, generating over $572 million in revenue. Over 4,000 jobs were supported by the tourism industry which produced more than $56 million in combined tax revenues at the local and county level.

== Demographics ==
Historical population
Census	Pop.	Note	%±
1860	1,507		—
1870	2,246		49.0%
1880	3,270		45.6%
1890	9,675		195.9%
1900	9,927		2.6%
1910	17,581		77.1%
1920	22,366		27.2%
1930	31,351		40.2%
1940	37,285		18.9%
1950	44,884		20.4%
1960	55,049		22.6%
1970	76,894		39.7%
1980	124,264		61.6%
1990	161,238		29.8%
2000	207,355		28.6%
2010	252,264		21.7%
2020	294,793		16.9%
2025 (est.)	304,261	▲	3.2%
U.S. Decennial Census; 1790–1960 1900–1990; 1990–2000 2010–2020

Thurston County has the sixth-largest population among Washington's counties and is among the fastest-growing in the state. From 2010 to 2020, the county's population became more ethnically diverse, with the number of residents who identify as Hispanic or Latino increasing by 63.2%. The county's largest city is Lacey, which has an estimated population of over 60,000 and surpassed Olympia's population in the early 2020s. The smallest incorporated place in Thurston County is the town of Bucoda, which has 620 residents. Over 145,000 people live in the unincorporated areas of the county, which are primarily concentrated between Olympia and Lacey.

The entire county is designated as part of the Olympia–Lacey–Tumwater Metropolitan Statistical Area (MSA), which only includes Thurston County. The MSA was among the fastest-growing metropolitan areas in the U.S. in the 2010s, with a year-to-year population increase of 2.24 percent. The county also had the highest population of middle class households among metropolitan areas in the U.S. according to a 2024 Pew Research study, which determined that 66 percent of households had adults with an annual income near double the national median household income. Thurston County is also part of the Seattle–Tacoma, WA Combined Statistical Area, which includes most of the Puget Sound region.

=== 2020 census ===
As of the 2020 census, there were 294,793 people, 115,397 households, and 76,717 families living in the county. Of the residents, 21.6% were under the age of 18, 5.1% were under 5 years of age, 18.2% were 65 years of age or older, and the median age was 39.5 years. For every 100 females there were 95.2 males, and for every 100 females age 18 and over there were 92.1 males. 78.7% of residents lived in urban areas and 21.3% lived in rural areas. The population density was 408.0 inhabitants per square mile (157.5/km^{2}). There were 121,438 housing units at an average density of 168.1 inhabitants per square mile (64.9/km^{2}).

Thurston County, Washington – Racial and ethnic composition Note: the US Census treats Hispanic/Latino as an ethnic category. This table excludes Latinos from the racial categories and assigns them to a separate category. Hispanics/Latinos may be of any race.
Race / Ethnicity (NH = Non-Hispanic)	Pop 2000	Pop 2010	Pop 2020	% 2000	% 2010	% 2020
White alone (NH)	172,963	199,019	207,985	83.41%	78.89%	70.55%
Black or African American alone (NH)	4,714	6,420	8,893	2.27%	2.55%	3.02%
Native American or Alaska Native alone (NH)	2,883	3,009	3,621	1.39%	1.19%	1.23%
Asian alone (NH)	9,034	12,820	16,878	4.36%	5.08%	5.73%
Pacific Islander alone (NH)	1,030	1,869	3,241	0.50%	0.74%	1.10%
Other race alone (NH)	576	417	1,782	0.28%	0.17%	0.60%
Mixed race or Multiracial (NH)	6,763	10,923	23,369	3.26%	4.33%	7.93%
Hispanic or Latino (any race)	9,392	17,787	29,024	4.53%	7.05%	9.85%
Total	207,355	252,264	294,793	100.00%	100.00%	100.00%

The racial makeup of the county was 73.2% White, 3.2% Black or African American, 1.5% American Indian and Alaska Native, 5.9% Asian, 1.1% Native Hawaiian and Pacific Islander, 3.5% from some other race, and 11.6% from two or more races. Hispanic or Latino residents of any race comprised 9.8% of the population.

There were 115,397 households in the county, of which 29.9% had children under the age of 18 living with them and 25.4% had a female householder with no spouse or partner present. About 25.3% of all households were made up of individuals and 11.0% had someone living alone who was 65 years of age or older.

There were 121,438 housing units, of which 5.0% were vacant. Among occupied housing units, 65.8% were owner-occupied and 34.2% were renter-occupied. The homeowner vacancy rate was 0.9% and the rental vacancy rate was 4.3%.

=== 2010 census ===
As of the 2010 census, there were 252,264 people, 100,650 households, and 66,161 families living in the county. The population density was 349.4 inhabitants per square mile (134.9/km^{2}). There were 108,182 housing units at an average density of 149.8 per square mile (57.8/km^{2}). The racial makeup of the county was 82.4% white, 5.2% Asian, 2.7% black or African American, 1.4% American Indian, 0.8% Pacific islander, 2.2% from other races, and 5.3% from two or more races. Those of Hispanic or Latino origin made up 7.1% of the population. In terms of ancestry, 21.2% were German, 13.4% were English, 13.2% were Irish, 5.0% were Norwegian, and 4.7% were American.

Of the 100,650 households, 31.7% had children under the age of 18 living with them, 49.9% were married couples living together, 11.4% had a female householder with no husband present, 34.3% were non-families, and 25.9% of all households were made up of individuals. The average household size was 2.46 and the average family size was 2.95. The median age was 38.5 years.

The median income for a household in the county was $60,930 and the median income for a family was $71,833. Males had a median income of $53,679 versus $41,248 for females. The per capita income for the county was $29,707. About 7.1% of families and 10.3% of the population were below the poverty line, including 13.0% of those under age 18 and 5.9% of those age 65 or over.

=== 2000 census ===
As of the 2000 census, there were 207,355 people, 81,625 households and 54,933 families living in the county. The population density was 285 people per square mile (110 people/km^{2}). There were 86,652 housing units at an average density of 119 units per square mile (46 units/km^{2}). The racial makeup of the county was 85.66% White, 2.35% Black or African American, 1.52% Native American, 4.41% Asian, 0.52% Pacific Islander, 1.69% from other races, and 3.85% from two or more races. 4.53% of the population were Hispanic or Latino of any race. 17.1% were of German, 10.2% English, 9.8% Irish, 6.9% United States or American and 5.5% Norwegian ancestry.

There were 81,625 households, of which 33.00% had children under the age of 18 living with them, 53.10% were married couples living together, 10.30% had a female householder with no husband present, and 32.70% were non-families. 25.10% of all households were made up of individuals, and 8.00% had someone living alone who was 65 years of age or older. The average household size was 2.50 and the average family size was 2.99.

Age distribution was 25.30% under the age of 18, 9.30% from 18 to 24, 29.30% from 25 to 44, 24.60% from 45 to 64, and 11.40% who were 65 years of age or older. The median age was 36 years. For every 100 females, there were 96.00 males. For every 100 females age 18 and over, there were 92.70 males.

The median household income was $46,975, and the median family income was $55,027. Males had a median income of $40,521 versus $30,368 for females. The per capita income for the county was $22,415. About 5.80% of families and 8.80% of the population were below the poverty line, including 9.80% of those under age 18 and 5.00% of those age 65 or over.

=== Homelessness ===
Thurston County is a participant in the mandatory federal Point-In-Time Count, a census of the local homeless population that is conducted by community organizations and volunteers. As of January 2024, there were 952 people in the county who were counted and classified as homeless, an increase of over 200 from the prior year. Most of the people who were identified as unsheltered lived in vehicles and 79 percent were from Thurston County or an adjacent county. Based on the Point-In-Time Count, Thurston County had a sixth-highest rate of people experiencing homelessness per capita among Washington's counties.

== Government ==
Thurston County is governed by a five-member board of county commissioners who are elected to four-year terms from proportional districts. The board of commissioners was enlarged from three members to five members in November 2023 following the approval of a ballot measure to expand the board that passed a year prior. The head of the Thurston County government's administration is the county manager, who is appointed by the board of commissioners. Since 2024, the county manager has been Leonard Hernandez, who was previously the CEO of San Bernardino County, California. Thurston County has used its commissioner–manager form of government since it was formed in 1852. An attempt to adopt a home rule charter with an elected county executive and seven-member county council was rejected by voters in 1979.

The county is split between two U.S. congressional districts, which each elect a member to the United States House of Representatives: the 3rd district, generally south of State Route 507; and the 10th district, which includes the urban areas of Olympia, Lacey, and Tumwater, as well as Yelm. Until the creation of the 10th district following the 2010 U.S. census, Olympia and Lacey were in separate congressional districts. At the state level, Thurston County is part of five legislative districts that each elect a state senator and two state representatives. The 2nd district encompasses the rural southeast of the county; the 19th district includes Grand Mound and the southwest corner of the county; the 20th district includes an area east of Grand Mound; the 22nd district includes Olympia, Lacey, and Tumwater; and the 35th district encompasses western and central Thurston County.

As of 2023, Thurston County had approximately 1,200 full-time employees and an annual budget of $132.2 million.

=== Special districts ===
Special-purpose districts include cemetery, fire, hospital, library, school, and water and sewer districts. Each special district is governed by officials elected by voters within that jurisdiction.

==== Fire districts ====
The county fire marshal supervises 15 fire districts, each with paid staff and volunteers.

Lacey Fire District 3, established on April 2, 1949, serves 109,800 people across 70 miles (110 km). It is governed by five elected commissioners and employs 160 staff, plus volunteers. In 2024, it had a $45.37 million operating budget and responded to 17,541 service calls (76% for medical service).

SE Thurston Fire Authority serves 33,750 residents across 84 miles (135 km), primarily in the cities of Yelm and Rainier. It was incorporated on July 1, 2010 and is governed by six elected commissioners, which appoint a fire chief. As of 2023, 36 employees and 15 volunteer fire fighters worked for the Authority; its budget was $6.71 million in 2023, $6.25 million in 2022 and $5.09 million in 2021.

West Thurston Regional Fire Authority (RFA), incorporated on January 1, 2010, is also governed by six elected commissioners. They appoint the fire chief, who supervises 37 permanent staff and 40 volunteer fire fighters. As of 2022, the District operated on a $8.6 million budget; $8.1 million in 2021; and $7.9 million in 2020. West Thurston RFA provides emergency services to 30,000 residents across 156 miles (251 km). In 2023, it responded to 3,471 service calls (74% for medical service), with most incidents in Grand Mound (1,164), Rochester (810) and Littlerock (552).

=== Politics ===
Thurston County leans Democratic in both national and local elections. The county has voted for the Democratic presidential candidate since 1988 and the candidates have consistently received a majority of the vote in the county. Democrat Bob Ferguson defeated Republican Dave Reichert in the 2024 gubernatorial election in Thurston County by an 11.6 percent margin, 55.7 percent to 44.1 percent. As of the 2024 election, all five Thurston County Commissioners are Democrats.

United States presidential election results for Thurston County, Washington
Year	Republican		Democratic		Third party(ies)	
Year	No.	%	No.	%	No.	%
1892	1,043	41.70%	810	32.39%	648	25.91%
1896	1,052	42.27%	1,415	56.85%	22	0.88%
1900	1,298	54.56%	978	41.11%	103	4.33%
1904	2,121	68.51%	668	21.58%	307	9.92%
1908	1,940	57.28%	964	28.46%	483	14.26%
1912	1,937	30.69%	1,456	23.07%	2,918	46.24%
1916	3,223	47.76%	2,658	39.39%	867	12.85%
1920	3,899	52.77%	1,367	18.50%	2,122	28.72%
1924	5,125	57.77%	943	10.63%	2,803	31.60%
1928	7,203	69.59%	3,013	29.11%	135	1.30%
1932	4,241	30.91%	6,308	45.97%	3,173	23.12%
1936	4,425	28.05%	10,647	67.49%	703	4.46%
1940	7,275	39.17%	11,092	59.72%	206	1.11%
1944	7,900	44.47%	9,708	54.64%	158	0.89%
1948	9,511	45.72%	10,461	50.28%	832	4.00%
1952	13,904	58.32%	9,764	40.96%	172	0.72%
1956	14,093	58.70%	9,897	41.22%	19	0.08%
1960	13,921	54.37%	11,620	45.38%	65	0.25%
1964	9,351	34.61%	17,578	65.05%	92	0.34%
1968	13,742	45.06%	14,228	46.65%	2,529	8.29%
1972	22,297	57.48%	14,596	37.63%	1,899	4.90%
1976	21,000	47.67%	21,247	48.23%	1,809	4.11%
1980	26,369	48.10%	20,508	37.41%	7,946	14.49%
1984	34,442	55.51%	26,840	43.26%	763	1.23%
1988	31,980	47.78%	33,860	50.59%	1,090	1.63%
1992	25,643	30.32%	38,293	45.28%	20,633	24.40%
1996	29,835	34.18%	45,522	52.16%	11,923	13.66%
2000	39,924	40.98%	50,467	51.80%	7,031	7.22%
2004	47,992	42.55%	62,650	55.55%	2,147	1.90%
2008	48,366	38.17%	75,882	59.89%	2,461	1.94%
2012	49,287	38.79%	74,037	58.27%	3,739	2.94%
2016	48,624	36.23%	68,798	51.27%	16,769	12.50%
2020	65,277	38.82%	96,608	57.46%	6,249	3.72%
2024	62,282	37.85%	95,663	58.14%	6,592	4.01%

== Education ==
Several school districts provide K–12 education in Thurston County, including those that overlap with other counties:

- Centralia School District (Washington)
- Griffin School District
- North Thurston Public Schools
- Olympia School District
- Rainier School District
- Rochester School District
- Tenino School District
- Tumwater School District
- Yelm Community Schools

Thurston County also has three post-secondary educational institutions:

- Evergreen State College
- Saint Martin's University
- South Puget Sound Community College

== Parks and recreation ==
The county has oversight of several rail trails, including the Chehalis Western Trail, which is the longest in the county, the Gate to Belmore Trail, and the Yelm-Rainier-Tenino Trail. The Karen Fraser Woodland Trail is cooperatively managed by Lacey and Olympia. Additional trails include the Capitol to Capitol Trail connecting communities from Capitol Forest to the capitol campus, the I-5 Bike Path that runs parallel to the interstate in Olympia, and the Ralph Munro Trail at Evergreen State College.

Parks under county jurisdiction include Burfoot, Deschutes Falls, Frye Cove (County) Park near Steamboat Island, and Kenneydell Park in Belmore on Black Lake. The combined Off-Leash Dog Park and Closed Looped Park area is located at the county's Waste and Recovery Center in Hawks Prairie.

The county hosts an annual event known as the Bicycle Community Challenge (BCC). Also given the moniker, the Bicycle Commuter Contest, the first BCC was held in 1988 and is considered the oldest bicycle commuter contest in Washington state. The BCC is a free program meant to motivate residents to use bicycles as a main mode of transportation. Intercity Transit became the main host of the event in 2006.

== Culture ==
=== Arts and music ===
Olympia is a noted countercultural hub in the Pacific Northwest, particularly in music. It gained national prominence for its indie music in the late 20th century, and was home to various grunge, punk, and indie rock bands that achieved national recognition in the 1980s and 1990s, notably including Nirvana, Bikini Kill, and Sleater-Kinney. Indie label K Records and the Evergreen State College's radio station KAOS, both founded by musician Calvin Johnson, brought many groups into the mainstream and wider success.

=== Media ===
The newspaper of record for Thurston County is The Olympian, a newspaper based in Olympia that is owned by the McClatchy Company and publishes three print editions per week. As of 2022, it has a circulation of 17,401. The Olympian was founded in 1891 and merged with several local newspapers in the early 20th century to become the sole daily newspaper in the county. Earlier newspapers included The Columbian, founded in 1852, and The Washington Standard, which was published weekly from 1860 to 1921. As the state capital, Olympia formerly had bureaus for newspapers across the state, including the two dailies in Seattle, and several reporters from the Associated Press. By 2021, the Olympia bureaus had shrunk to only six reporters.

The county also has several weekly and online news publications. The Nisqually Valley News, founded in 1922, is published weekly in Yelm and has been a sister publication of The Chronicle of Centralia since 1994. Tenino had several competing newspapers during the 1910s that were succeeded by the Tenino Independent, which has been published weekly since 1922. An alt weekly, the Weekly Volcano was published in Olympia from 2001 to 2013; it was later revived in 2023. The Journal of Olympia, Lacey & Tumwater (JOLT) is a non-profit online news organization that was founded in 2020.

=== Libraries ===
Thurston County is part of the Timberland Regional Library, a public library system that serves five counties in southwestern Washington and is headquartered in Tumwater. It has seven locations in the county and a dedicated bookmobile service. Thurston County is a founding member of the Timberland system, which was established as a pilot project in 1964 and made into a permanent intercounty rural library district in 1968. The county had previously been served by the South Puget Sound Regional Library, which was contracted to operate libraries in the cities of Lacey, Olympia, and Yelm. These cities were later annexed directly into the Timberland system by the 1980s. The oldest public library in the county was opened in 1896 by the Woman's Club of Olympia, who donated their collection of 900 books to the city government in 1909. A permanent Carnegie library in Olympia was opened in 1914 with 1,500 books and was used by the city and Timberland until a new library building opened in 1978.

== Infrastructure ==
=== Transportation ===
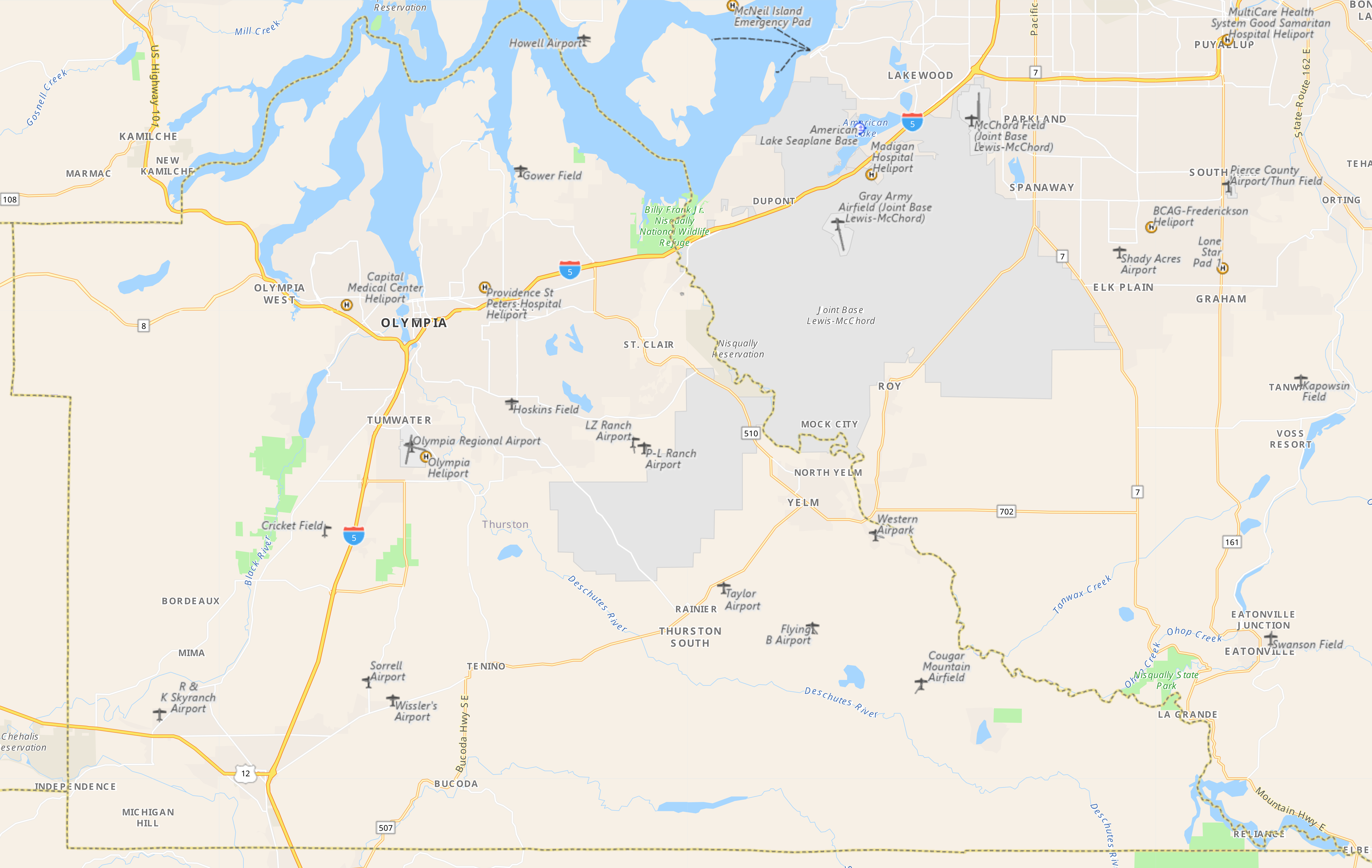
Major roads and transportation features, July 2025

Thurston County is bisected by Interstate 5, the major north–south freeway on the U.S. West Coast that connects Washington, Oregon, and California. The freeway travels through Grand Mound, Tumwater, Olympia, and Lacey and continues south to Portland, Oregon, and north to Tacoma and Seattle. It was constructed in the 1950s and 1960s to replace U.S. Route 99, the original north–south highway in Western Washington. Interstate 5 intersects several other highways within Thurston County that provide connections to other areas of Washington state. These include U.S. Route 12, which travels west from Grand Mound to Aberdeen; U.S. Route 101, which encircles most of the Olympic Peninsula and provides access to Aberdeen via State Route 8; and State Route 510, which travels along the Nisqually River to Yelm, where it intersects State Route 507.

The county has two public transportation providers and connections to other systems that serve neighboring counties. Intercity Transit has 21 routes that serve the cities and urban growth areas of Olympia, Lacey, Tumwater, and Yelm. In addition to local service, the agency operates The One, a rapid bus service in Olympia and Lacey, and express buses to Lakewood that connect with Pierce Transit and Sound Transit. All routes in the Intercity Transit system have been fare-free since 2020; the agency is funded by a local sales tax within its service area, which was formed in 1980. Rural Transit is operated by the Thurston Regional Planning Council between communities south of Olympia and Tumwater. It is also fare-free and connects with Lewis County Transit in Centralia.

Passenger rail service through Thurston County is operated by Amtrak, which has two routes that serve Centennial Station in southern Lacey, which opened in 1993 and is primarily run by volunteers. The Cascades has several daily trips to Seattle, Portland, and Vancouver; the Coast Starlight has one daily train that runs between Seattle, Sacramento, the San Francisco Bay Area, and Los Angeles. These routes run on tracks owned by the BNSF Railway, which primarily operates freight trains through the county on the Seattle Subdivision. Several branch railroads also pass through Thurston County, including the Puget Sound and Pacific Railroad and two lines owned by the Port of Olympia that were leased to Tacoma Rail until 2016.

The county has one public airport, Olympia Regional Airport, which is owned by the Port of Olympia and used for general aviation, business flights, air ambulances, and government use. It has two runways, a passenger terminal, and an air traffic control tower. The airport and two other sites in Thurston County were among candidates considered by a state legislative commission for a new passenger airport in Washington, however the county and local city leaders oppose such plans.

=== Utilities ===
The county's consumer electricity and natural gas is provided by Puget Sound Energy, a private company that serves most of the Seattle metropolitan area. The company has 1,332 miles (2,144 km) of overhead lines and 1,332 miles (2,144 km) underground lines to serve over 131,000 total customers in Thurston County. Puget Sound Energy's natural gas infrastructure includes 973 miles (1,566 km) of mains in the county. Several public utilities, including city governments and county-owned rural systems, provide water to residents and businesses.

=== Healthcare ===
Thurston County has two major hospitals, both with helipads.

Providence St. Peter Hospital, located north of Lacey, has 372 beds and is operated by Providence Health & Services. It was founded in 1887 at a location in Olympia and moved to its current campus near Lacey in 1971.

Capital Medical Center is located in Olympia and operated by MultiCare Health since 2021; it has 107 beds and an off-campus emergency room in Lacey. It was built in 1985 to address a shortage in hospital capacity in the South Puget Sound region.

== Communities ==
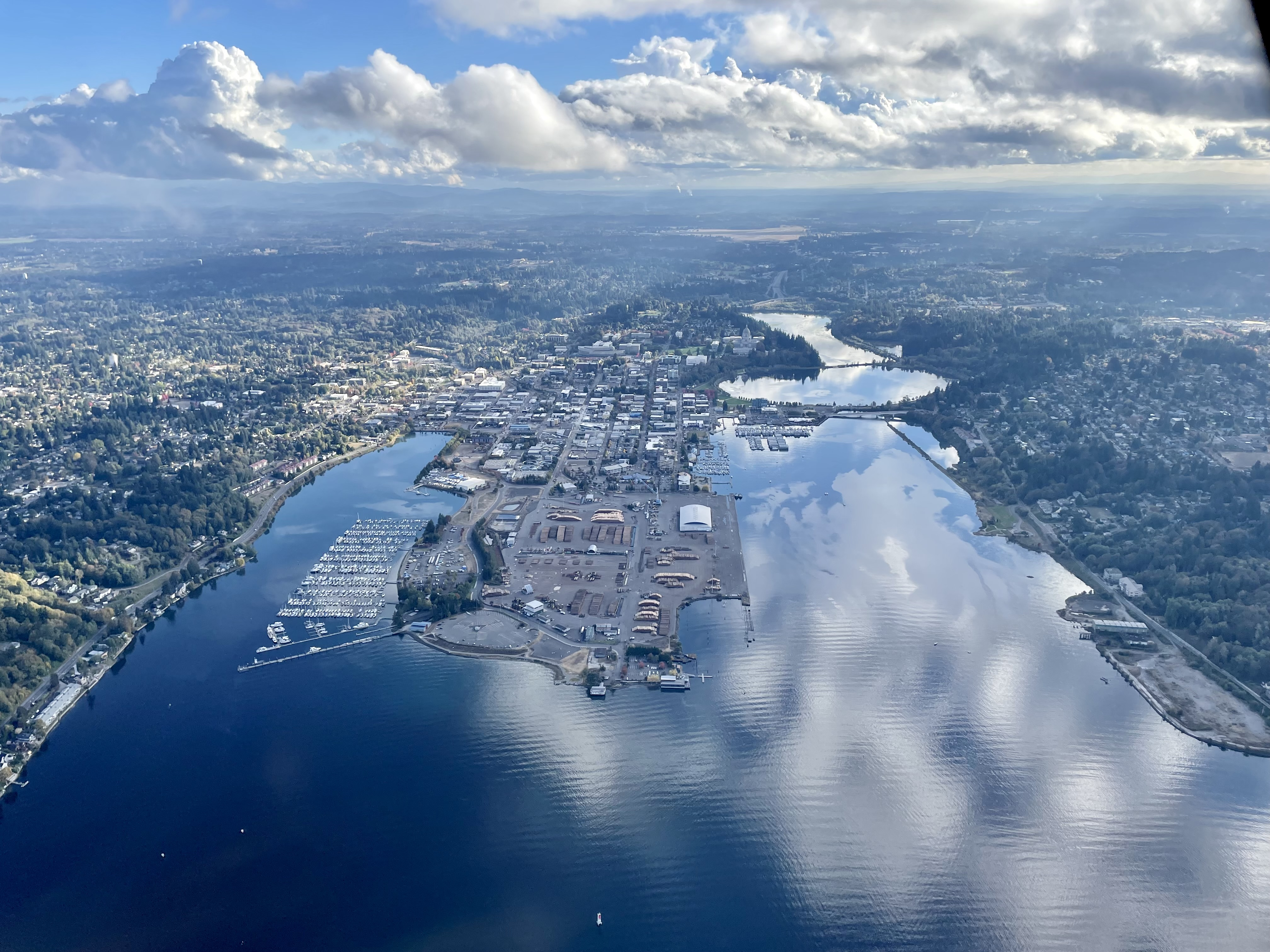
Aerial view of Olympia, the county seat of and largest city in Thurston County

=== Cities ===
- Lacey
- Olympia (county seat)
- Rainier
- Tenino
- Tumwater
- Yelm

=== Towns ===
- Bucoda

=== Census-designated places ===
- Grand Mound
- Nisqually Reservation
- North Yelm
- Rochester
- Tanglewilde

=== Unincorporated communities ===
- Belmore
- Boston Harbor
- Bush
- Driftwood
- Delphi
- East Olympia (Fir Tree)
- Gate
- Independence
- Indian Summer
- Kellys Corner
- Lake Lawrence
- Littlerock
- Maytown
- McIntosh
- Mima
- Mushroom Corner
- Offutt Lake
- Puget
- Rignall
- Saint Clair
- Schneiders Prairie
- Skookumchuck
- South Bay
- Steamboat Island
- Sunnydale
- Vail

=== Ghost towns ===
- Bordeaux
- Tono

== See also ==
- National Register of Historic Places listings in Thurston County, Washington
- History of Washington (state)
- History of Olympia, Washington
