= Hanaford, Washington =

Former community in Lewis County, Washington

- Former community, locale
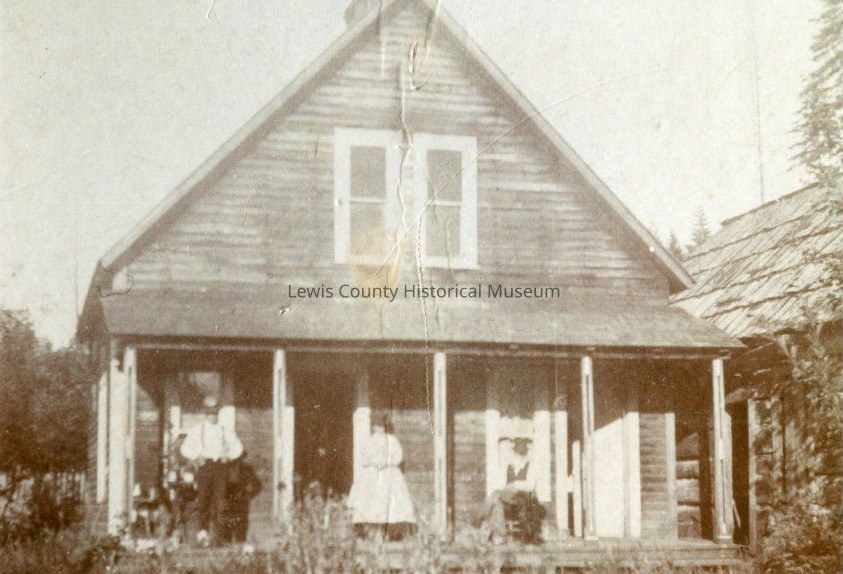
- The Zumwalt House in Hanaford, ca.1900-1910
- Nickname: The Hannaford
- Location within Washington (state) Location within the United States
- Coordinates: 46°45′04″N 122°55′37″W
- Country: United States
- State: Washington
- County: Lewis
- Time zone: UTC-8 (Pacific (PST))
  - Summer (DST): UTC-7 (PDT)
- ZIP Code: 98531
- Area code(s): 360, 564

Hanaford, Washington, also known as Hannaford, is a former community and locale in Lewis County, Washington.

The informal farming community was first settled by its namesake, Theophilus Hanaford, and his wife Lucy in the 1860s. The area of settlement remained small and an official post office was never established. By the late 1890s, the Hanaford family's original homestead had been sold to other residents in the valley.

Hanaford contained several schools and a grange. In the aftermath of the Centralia Tragedy in 1919, possible fugitives from the incident were reported to be located in Hanaford; an attempt lasting several days to arrest the accused, suspected to be hiding in an abandoned cabin, led to nationwide news reporting. The community in the valley also gained notoriety for various reports on UFO sightings in the 1960s.

Hanaford and the surrounding valley began to experience an economic increase in the late 19th century with the undertaking of timber harvesting and coal mining, two abundant sources throughout the region. The coal seams led to the creation of the Centralia Coal Mine and adjacent Centralia Power Plant in the 1970s.

== Etymology ==
The community was named after its founder, Theophilus G. Hanaford, known under the nickname, "Thof". Early settlers often spelled the named as "Hannaford" or considered the community as "The Hannaford". The reason supplied is simply stated as, "for good measure". During planning for a railroad line in the valley in 1883, the community was mistakenly recorded in the Washington State Archives as "Hourford". The fault was considered due to poor handwriting on incorporation paperwork.

== History ==
=== 19th century ===
The first non-indigenous settlers in Hanaford Valley were Theophilus and Lucy (Hapwood) Hanaford, pioneer citizens. The Hanafords were recorded to have settled at the "upper reaches" of Hanaford Creek in either 1864, 1866, or 1867. Their first home, built by Theophilus and his son, Sidney, was a one-room, split cedar structure with a dirt floor. The home had window openings but no glass; it was expanded two years later to include two more rooms and eight window panes. Theophilus was recorded to have died on March 21, 1892, supposedly during physical labor; he was attempting to improve his property when he noticed other homesteaders had better looking homes. He was buried in a cemetery in Bucoda. His son died in 1895.

Early settlers included William Packwood of Packwood, Washington, Henry Shields, a county commissioner in the late 19th century, and Zaddock Null of Nulls Crossing. The community was to expand in early 1875 with the arrival of 80 to 100 Scottish immigrants. Paying $75, equivalent to $2,199 in 2025, the group arrived in Olympia under the promise of a potential homestead by a man referred to as an immigration agent, known only as "Fleming". Approximately 20 families were noted to live within the Hanaford Valley by 1884.

An earthquake occurred during the midnight hours in Hanaford during 1893, the shaking powerful enough to wake residents.

By the end of the 19th century, the original 310-acre (130 ha) claim of the Hanaford family, as well as Sidney's 160-acre (65 ha) parcel, had been sold to other residents and almost completely cleared of trees, converted into productive farm land instead.

=== 20th century ===
After the Centralia Tragedy in November 1919, possibly three or more members of the International Workers of the World (IWW) involved in the event were suspected to be hiding in a cabin in Hanaford, hiding from a posse formed of loggers and veterans. A shootout occurred at the densely wooded cabin on November 16; posse member John Haney, who was a rancher from nearby Tenino, was killed. A second posse, consisting of approximately 40 men, was formed the next day and continued a broader search around the valley; Haney's body, which remained overnight after his death, was retrieved. Haney's death was found to be due to friendly fire as he was mistaken by the posse as a potential Wobbly. (Note: "Wobbly" or "Wobblies" are non-pejorative nicknames for members of the Industrial Workers of the World (IWW). The origin of the moniker remains uncertain.) On November 18, the cabin was found to have been "deserted for a fortnight", with no evidence the building was used by the IWW members on the run. One of the accused, Bert Bland, was apprehended in Independence that same day, and stated at no point did he hide out in Hanaford during the search. News out of Hanaford during the attempts to capture the IWW members was made difficult due to downed telephone lines, thought to have been caused Wobbly sabotage.

By 1913, the Hanaford and Salzer valley communities, combined, were reported to contain approximately 150 families. The Salzer Valley-Hanaford Grange was formed by March 1937. The grange, the 24th known in the county, was first located out of the Salzer Valley schoolhouse.

The valley community was the site of several UFO sightings and "strange noises" during June and July, 1967. In one instance, the objects were described as small and white, "like pinheads". Government officials were reported to have investigated. No official report was filed and accounts of sightings suddenly dropped when "attention was drawn" to the community.

=== Post office ===
A rural mail route to the community was often difficult due to poor conditions of local roads; costs to upgrade the infrastructure was repeatedly deemed as too excessive. A mail route between Centralia and the Hurn post office was established around the turn of the 20th century; while on route between the two locations, mailmen delivered posts twice per week to residents in the valley. A permanent mail route was denied in 1911, reproposed in 1913, and rejected again in 1915. (Note: A mail route was also denied prior to 1911 but sourcing does not give a specific year when the request was rejected.)

== Geography ==
The informal community of Hanaford was located in the Hanaford Valley. Additional communities or towns located within the valley included Hurn, Kopiah, Mendota, and Tono.

Coal was plentiful enough that settlers often dug ore on their own property to use for fuel. Water wells were often contaminated with the taste of coal.

== Education ==
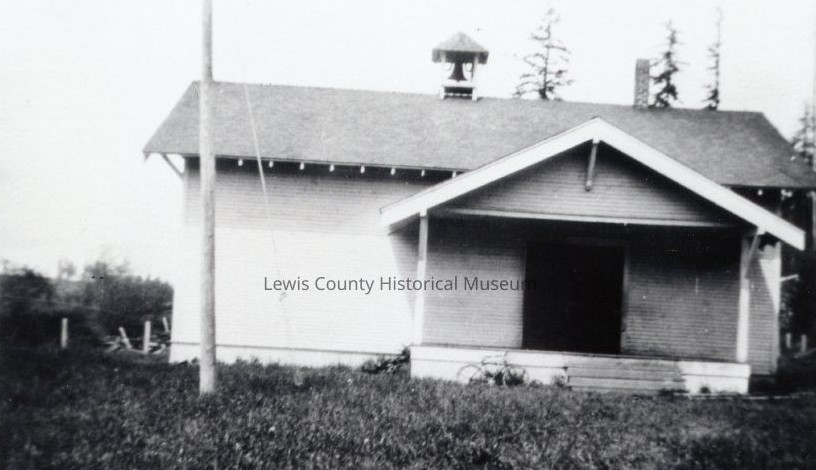
Upper Hanaford Schoolhouse, ca. 1928

The first Hanaford Valley school and district was organized by Robert Gibson in 1880. Gibson also became the first teacher. The one-room schoolhouse was located on a heavily forested hill and was made of cedar logs; the structure had a 60 ft × 100 ft (18 m × 30 m) footprint. The grounds lacked enough space for a playground and students ended up using the barnyard of the Yantis family located below the hill. The schoolhouse also lacked running water; students filled a pail from a spring located 200 feet (61.0 m) from the building. Scripture was read to begin the school's day and hymns were sung. Students were punished for whispering by laying unmoving on a platform, their feet and legs required to touch the floor and walls at all times for up to fifteen minutes. (Note: The author, Miss Herndon Smith, listed in several sources used, is not specifically given a first name in the newspaper references. Although credited by the newspaper as being an author of the book, "Centralia - The First 50 Years", she is neither credited nor mentioned in said book.)

An early schoolhouse, known as Knowledge Hill School, was located between the valley and Bucoda. By 1897, three schoolhouses were located in the valley, recorded as being well attended. The valley was also home to Hilcrest School in the early 20th century.

Another school facility, the South Hannaford schoolhouse and existed on a 1.5-acre (0.61 ha) parcel. The building and property was sold to a Centralia High School teacher for $500 in 1964. The sale was part of a fundraiser for a youth camp from Mayfield. The camp had only owned the grounds for a short time after having been deeded the property by a community center in Hanaford Valley.

In 1975, Hanaford was the location of the newly formed Lewis County Community School, run by a tax-exempt organization. The school was originally located in a farm building in Little Hanaford and was meant to provide an educational structure tailored to each individual student. The school moved to Newaukum in 1976.

== Economy ==
The economy of Hanaford and the valley was once reliant on farming, particularly in oats and wheat; residents supplemented their diet by hunting local wildlife. Farmers began growing tobacco in 1889.

The opening of coal mines in the late 19th century converted the valley's financial outlook; some residential homes were removed in order to reach coal veins. Early surveying of the valley, estimating nearly 200,000 acres of potential coal fields in the region, led to the creation of the Hanaford Valley Railroad and Improvement Company in 1883.

Logging and beaver trapping also took place in the valley. In 1898, five logging camps were active with over 1,000,000 board feet of lumber produced by the end of the year. By March 1899, several hundred thousand board feet of timber was being cut and delivered to local mills per week.

By the early 1920s, the valley was also known for livestock, particularly pure-bred Holstein cows. Mining and timber production continued to produce large, daily quantities of ore and lumber.

=== Centralia Coal Mine and Power Plant ===
The Centralia Power Plant was first constructed beginning in August 1968 and the Centralia Coal Mine began producing in April 1971. The steam plant's first boiler became operational in August 1971 and the entire plant considered effectively complete and operational by early September 1972. Approximately 250 people were hired for permanent, full-time positions after the plant's completion.

In November 2006, the mine, which provided fuel to the adjacent power plant, was shut down by the owner, TransAlta. The closure lead to the loss of up to 600 jobs. (Note: The total number of jobs lost after the closure of the mine shifts between 550 and 600 employees. See sources in the section for the discrepancy.) The site spanned 14,000 acres (5,700 ha), (Note: The acreage of the coal fields in Hanaford Valley varies from as low as 9,000 acres (3,600 ha) to as much as 22,000 acres (8,900 ha) depending on the source. See sources on the page or at the respective articles for the discrepancies.) with 3,793 acres (1,535 ha) mined for coal. The mine was considered too old and costly to operate. The plant began to operate on coal shipped from Montana and Wyoming.

== Infrastructure ==
The Tenino & Hanaford Valley Railroad was incorporated in October 1883 with plans for the line to follow Hanaford Creek and connect to the Olympia & Tenino Railroad. There is no evidence that any portion of the project was constructed. A 100 foot (30 m) steel railroad bridge was built over Hanaford Creek in 1897. By March 1907, the Hanaford Valley Railroad Company was formed. The line was to connect Centralia and Tacoma to the coal beds in the valley; the construction cost of the rail line was deemed to offset by the "valuable enough" coal seams. The construction of a 7-mile (11 km) track begin in July. A total of 9 miles (14 km) were completed in January 1908.

The first telephone line to run through the valley was in 1906. The line, under Hanaford Valley Telephone Co., was granted rights to connect to the city of Centralia.
