= Skookumchuck Dam =

Earthen dam in Washington state

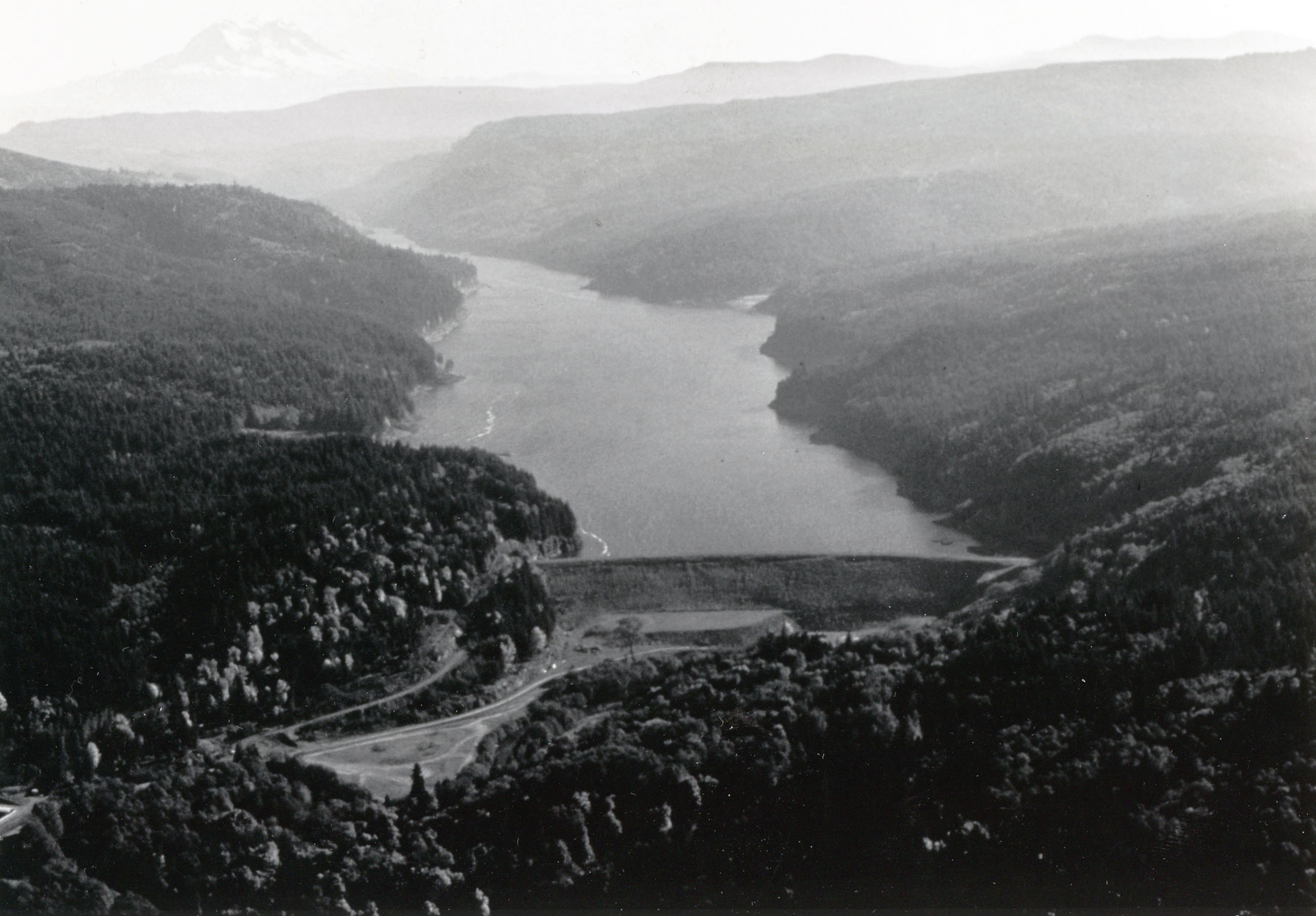
- Aerial view, Skookumchuck Dam
- Interactive map of Skookumchuck Dam
- Country: United States
- Location: Lewis County, Washington
- Coordinates: 46°46′58.4″N 122°42′43″W
- Purpose: Reservoir
- Status: Operational
- Opening date: 1970
- Owner: TransAlta

Dam and spillways
- Type of dam: Embankment
- Height (foundation): 190 feet (57.9 m)
- Length: 1,340 feet (408.4 m)

Reservoir
- Creates: Skookumchuck Reservoir
- Total capacity: 38,800 acre-feet
- Surface area: 550 acres (220 ha)
- Maximum length: 8 miles (13 km)

Power Station
- Installed capacity: 1 megawatt-hour (3.6 GJ)

Skookumchuck Dam is an earthen dam located on the Skookumchuck River in Washington state, east of Bucoda and Tono. Owned by TransAlta since 2004, the embankment was built in 1970 to supply water for the Centralia Power Plant located in Hanaford Valley.

Various proposals have been introduced to use the dam as a flood-mitigation tool or have the levee removed to improve river flow and the ecosystem. The Centralia Power Plant, also owned by TransAlta was decommissioned in 2025; water rights to the dam are planned to be given to the city of Centralia.

== History ==
The construction of the Skookumchuck Dam was first announced in May 1967; the barrier was to be placed at a location on the Skookumchuck River known as Bloody Run. The dam was built under ownership of Pacific Power & Light Company beginning in May 1969. (Note: Other sources mention construction of the dam may have begun in April 1969.) Completed in October 1970, the earthen embankment was built by Lockheed Shipbuilding and Construction Company of Seattle at a cost of $6 million. The damming of the waterway created a 4-mile-long (6.4 km) reservoir known as the Skookumchuck Reservoir.

The dam was sold to TransAlta in 2004, and its primary use is to provide water for the Centralia Power Plant; (Note: The Centralia Power Plant is known under several other monikers, such as the Centralia Steam Plant, Centralia Steam-Electric Plant, and as the Big Hanaford Plant. See sources in this article, or the respective article on the coal plant, for more information.) it is not used for local or community water needs. (Note: Although the reservoir's purpose was not as a water supply for the local region, in the year after construction, the city of Centralia had access to 2,000,000 US gallons (7,600,000 L; 1,700,000 imp gal) per day if necessary.) The dam is an earthen bank structure measuring 190 feet (57.9 m) tall and spans 1,340 feet (408.4 m).

With low water levels in the reservoir, the system provides some flood protection to communities downstream, such as Bucoda; however, the dam was not built for flood prevention. The earthen dam has been part of several flood-mitigation proposals to protect the Centralia and Chehalis communities from continuing overflow events. The embankment contains a trap system in which mature steelhead are caught and transported over the spillway, but existing fish passages prevent young salmon from migrating.

The dam and reservoir are managed by TransAlta and, by contract, the company has continued in their oversight role after the coal plant was closed at the end of 2025. Water rights are planned to revert to the city of Centralia; the reservoir is to be used for public consumption.

== Dam removal ==
Studies focusing on certain aspects on removing the dam were begun with a first phase in 2020 under the Office of Chehalis Basin (OCB) and connected agencies and organizations. An OCB study released in 2022 estimated a removal cost up to $35 million, with a potential high of $80 million when factors are added for the loss of downstream water rights. The study concluded that the best options were improvements to the dam to include fish passages, as well as to use the dam for flood control purposes.

In June 2024, a petition to remove the dam at the termination of the Centralia Steam Generation Plant operations was filed by the Quinault Indian Nation. Requesting the removal by at least the end of 2025, the Quinault expects immediate, natural restoration of the river's flow and salmon habitat.

As of 2025, the dam is no longer being considered for removal.

== Geography ==
The dam is located on the Skookumchuck River in Hanaford Valley. The embankment is approximately 11 miles (18 km) east of Centralia and east of Bucoda and the ghost town of Tono. The reservoir spans 8 miles (13 km) in length.

== Environment and ecology ==
As of 2011, the dam is temporarily shut down during an annual release of approximately 100,000 steelhead trout into the river system. The efforts are part of a larger distribution of fish species in the surrounding watershed.

== Technical aspects ==
The embankment contains 2,200,000 cubic yards (1,700,000 m^{3}) of earthen fill that was taken from the surrounding hills in the valley. A concrete spillway, a control outlet, and a fish passage were added at construction. The dam contained an intake pipe that could extract water from the reservoir at different levels, supplying cooler or warmer water as needed for the steam plant. A 12-mile-long (19 km) pipeline connected to a 3-foot-wide (0.91-metre), 3-mile-long (4.8 km) pipe that transferred the supply to the energy facility. The surface of the reservoir was reported to cover 550 acres (220 ha) and contain up to 38800 acre⋅ft of storage capacity.

A one-megawatt power station at the dam was put back into operation by April 2011. The electrical facility had been inoperable since TransAlta's purchase of the site from Pacific Power in 2004.

== Recreation ==
The Washington State Parks Department proposed several recreation spots around the reservoir in the early 1970s. As of 2025, no approved recreation areas have been built.
