= Mendota =

Mendota can refer to any of the following places in the United States:

- Mendota, California
- Mendota, Illinois, a city in LaSalle County
- Mendota Township, LaSalle County, Illinois
- Mendota, Minnesota
- Mendota Heights, Minnesota
- Mendota, Virginia
- Mendota, Washington
- Lake Mendota, Madison, Wisconsin
- The Mendota Mental Health Institute in Madison, Wisconsin
