= Centralia Coal Mine =

Mine in Washington (state), US

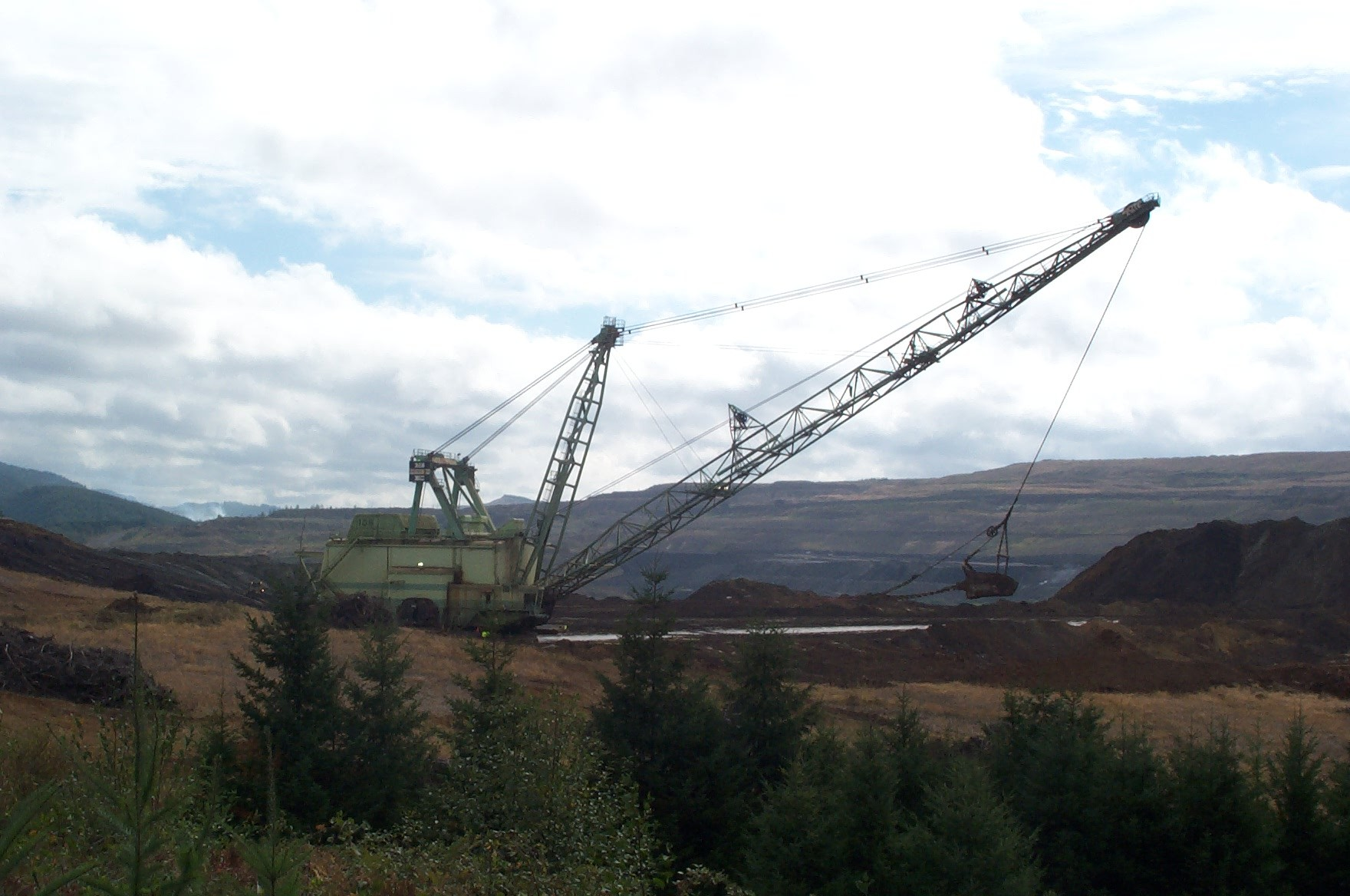
- Dragline at the Centralia coal mine, 2006

- Location within Washington (state)
- Location: Centralia, Washington, United States; 46°46′24″N 122°50′36″W
- Type: Strip mine
- Discovered: 1951
- Opened: 1970
- Closed: 2006
- Company: TransAlta

Centralia Coal Mine was an open-pit coal mine, owned by the Canadian-based TransAlta Corporation. The mine, reported to be expensive to operate, was shut down in 2006.

Also referred to as the TransAlta Centralia Mining (TCM) operation, it was located northeast of the city of Centralia, in Lewis County, in the US state of Washington. As part of a combined $554 million purchase along with the Centralia Power Plant, the mine was bought by TransAlta in July 1999.

== Background ==
The 1854 Treaty of Medicine Creek, in defining the geographic scope of the agreement, refers to a coal mine on "Skookum Chuck Creek". The Hanaford Valley was rich enough in coal that early settlers in the 19th century often dug into coal seams on their property to use for fuel.

The earliest known recorded settler to begin a coal mine was N.B. Kelsey. Beginning operations in 1884, Kelsey had previously discovered a seam in 1878 while hunting for bear on his claim located in the valley. He delivered his first haul to the city of Centralia in 1886, his loads decorated with bunting and escorted into town by a brass band. Kelsey's coal sold for $3.50 per ton, equivalent to $125 in 2025. Kelsey further dug large mines for gold though the efforts led only to additional coal seams and a possible discovery of an ancient river bed. Another settler, Rufus Packwood, son of William Packwood of Packwood, Washington, is recorded as an early resident in the valley to first develop and sell his claim to a mining company.

In December 1951, an estimated 1.75 billion metric tons (1.75×10^{9} t) of bituminous coal was discovered in Lewis County near Centralia by the United States Department of the Interior. Twelve coal beds, ranging in thickness from 4 feet (1.2 m) to 40 feet (12.2 m) were noted. In 1959, after 17 months of additional surveys by Pacific Power & Light Company of Portland and Spokane-based Washington Water Power Company, the fields were estimated last for 50 years. A test pit was dug and the coal was sampled to determine its thermal properties; engineering measurements were also undertaken for the stacking of "overburden" or removed soil. Additional sampling of the fields to determine the location of "major" seams began in April 1967; the discovery efforts lasted a year.

== History ==
The mine began as part of the construction of the Centralia Steam Plant; the plant was first announced in May 1967. The mine was first operated by Washington Irrigation and Development Company (WIDC) and the site, planned to be mined for up to 35 years, was reported to be as large as 22,000 acres (8,900 ha). (Note: The acreage of the mine varies wildly, sometimes to as low as 7,000 acres (2,800 ha). Most sources mention approximately above 9,000 acres (3,600 ha). See sources throughout the article for the discrepancies.) The mined coal was supplied exclusively to the adjacent coal-fired plant, known also as the Centralia Power Plant and as the Centralia Steam-Electric Plant. After years of sampling and tests, coal was officially dug and hauled to the plant in April 1971. In honor of the steam plant's opening in September and the coal mine's connection to the project, the Centralia newspaper, The Daily Chronicle, published a 52-page special known as the "Steam Plant Dedication Edition" on September 24, 1971.

A state law was passed in 1997 specifically tailored to keep the mine open. The bill allowed for significant tax breaks on coal purchased in the state.

At a total cost of $554 million, TransAlta purchased the mine for $101 million in July 1999, with an additional $453 million for the power plant, from PacifiCorp who had been the owner since 1990. Combined with the Centralia Power Plant, the site was TransAlta's first generator in the United States.

The coal mine was operated under a subsidiary of TransAlta known as TransAlta Centralia Mining LLC. In 2000, the 600 employees of the mine successfully worked without a "time-loss" accident for over 1 million hours, a first in the mine's history.

=== Closure ===
On November 27, 2006, TransAlta stopped operations at the mine, citing increasing operation costs of approximately $80 million, and began using coal from the Powder River Basin in Wyoming, and mines in Montana, to supply its power plant. Employees were notified at 3:15 PM before the swing shift change.

The Centralia seams were often deeper, fractured, required more cleaning, and thus the mine more costly to operate, as opposed to the Montana and Wyoming mines where coal was cleaner and easier to access. A major seam in the valley was known as "The Big Dirty". The closure was due to other economic factors, including unprofitable costs in expanding the coal fields into a seventh pit which required costly environmental mitigation, recent repairs and financial losses after numerous heavy rains and flooding in the valley, and increased prices of fuel and metals needed to operate the mine.

The mine employed about 600 workers at the time of the closure; twenty employees were kept to handle efforts on permits and reclamation. The job losses in Centralia and Lewis County were referred to as "our Boeing", comparing the outcome to that of Boeing's 1970s decline in Seattle. Workers were paid wages into the following January and TranAlta instituted several investments into the local area, including a $5 million fund for the "community's transition". Mining equipment was sold beginning immediately and the future re-opening of the mine deemed uncertain.

The mine began being reclaimed, with the aim of returning the land to its former forested state. The reclamation includes the fill of open pits, regrading, and the dredging of water sources, while planting trees and other natural flora. As of 2023, half of the reclamation project was considered complete. The site has been determined as a potential recreation area once the recovery processes are complete.

Though closed for almost two decades, the site's federal mining permit was extended until 2030. The permit had previously meant to expire in 2025. The extension was requested and approved due to TransAlta's ongoing reclamation projects within 6,600 acres (2,700 ha), out of approximately 9,000 acres (3,600 ha), covered under the permit.

The Centralia Coal Mine was the largest coal mine, and last of its type, in Washington state.

== Geography and geology ==
The mining grounds, located within Hanaford Valley, span between 9,000 acres (3,600 ha) to 14,000 acres (5,700 ha) from Bucoda, Washington to approximately 5 miles (8 km) north of Centralia. Coal seams were located as deep as 260 feet (79.2 m). The overall coal fields were estimated in 1970 to be the largest in the state and to contain approximately 500,000,000 tonnes (490,000,000 long tons; 550,000,000 short tons).

The coal beds are part of the Skookumchuck Formation, which is composed of nearshore marine and nonmarine sedimentary rocks. The Skookumchuck Rock belongs to the upper member of the Eocene Puget Group. The coal veins, considered young in comparison to other coal regions, are estimated to be 70 million years old spanning from a time when the region was a swamp, bordering on an ocean. The seams are fractured and non-continuous, either interrupted or displaced with faults and cracks.

The coal in the valley is considered to be of lower energy makeup. It is relatively low in sulphur but high in ash content.

== Production ==
Coal was mined via strip mining, using a dragline, earthmovers, and large trucks to haul away the ore. The amount of soil required to be moved to reach the deep veins led to what was considered in 1970 to be the largest, most advanced mining and delivery system created in the United States. The Bucyrus-Erie 1370 dragline, installed beginning in January 1970, was capable of hauling up to 56 cubic yards (43 m^{3}) in one pass; coal was delivered directly to the steam plant by use of a 2-mile (3.2 km)-long conveyor belt system.

Throughout most of the 1990s, the mine delivered about 80% of the required amount of coal the steam plant needed annually. The mine's average annual production over 1997–2001 was 4.4 million short tons (4,000,000 metric tons) per year; average annual production over the life of the mine was 4.3 million short tons (3,900,000 metric tons) per year. The Centralia Mine completed its 31st year of production in 2001, producing 4,624,245 short tons (4,195,044 metric tons) of sub-bituminous coal, 354,481 short tons (321,580 metric tons) more than it produced in 2000. Officials of TransAlta Centralia were planning to increase annual production at the mine to more than 5 million tons per year and were looking at another 25 years of production from the mine.

Two mining pits, known as North Hanford and Mendota, had been in operation for 15 years by 1997, and after reaching a depth of 400 feet (121.9 m), were running out of coal. A third pit, given the name Kopiah, had been opened that year after the mine purchased a $3.5 million, 370 metric tons (370 t) power shovel in late 1996. (Note: The mine, before the purchase of the 1997 shovel, operated with four shovels, one hydraulic and three electric.) The Hitachi machinery, one of only ten in the world, was considered the largest in the Pacific Northwest. Assembled onsite, the shovel had a 51 foot (16 m) reach and was capable of hauling 34,000 metric tons (34,000 t) of coal per day.

Coal production in 2001 at the Centralia Mine came from 4 open pits; mined coal beds were the Upper and Lower Thompson, the Big Dirty and Little Dirty seams, and the Smith seam.

== Reclamation ==
By 1974, approximately 1,400 acres (570 ha) of the site had been mined. As part of the Washington Surface-Mined Land Reclamation Act, which required mining companies to restore acreage to its "substantial conformity with the immediate surrounding land area", WIDC had reclaimed an estimated 260 acres (110 ha). The reclamation efforts included reshaping the lands into contours similar to its prior state. Grasses and other vegetation, such as Douglas fir for future timber harvesting, (Note: Approximately 70,000 Douglas firs were reported to be replanted by 1974.) The efforts were recognized by the Washington State Department of Ecology (WSDOE) in 1975 with an "Environmental Excellence Award"; the award was the first ever handed out by the WSDOE to an industry.

Ongoing efforts to restore and manage the mined lands for wildlife habitat was recognized in 1996 by the Maryland-based Wildlife Habitat Council. The award noted the ecosystem's reclamation had been geared for Canadian geese and elk, the inclusion of several bird monitoring programs, and the continuation of tree planting.

== See also ==
- Coal mining in the United States
- Skookumchuck Dam
- Tono, Washington
