= Hanaford Valley =

Valley in Washington state

- Hannaford Valley
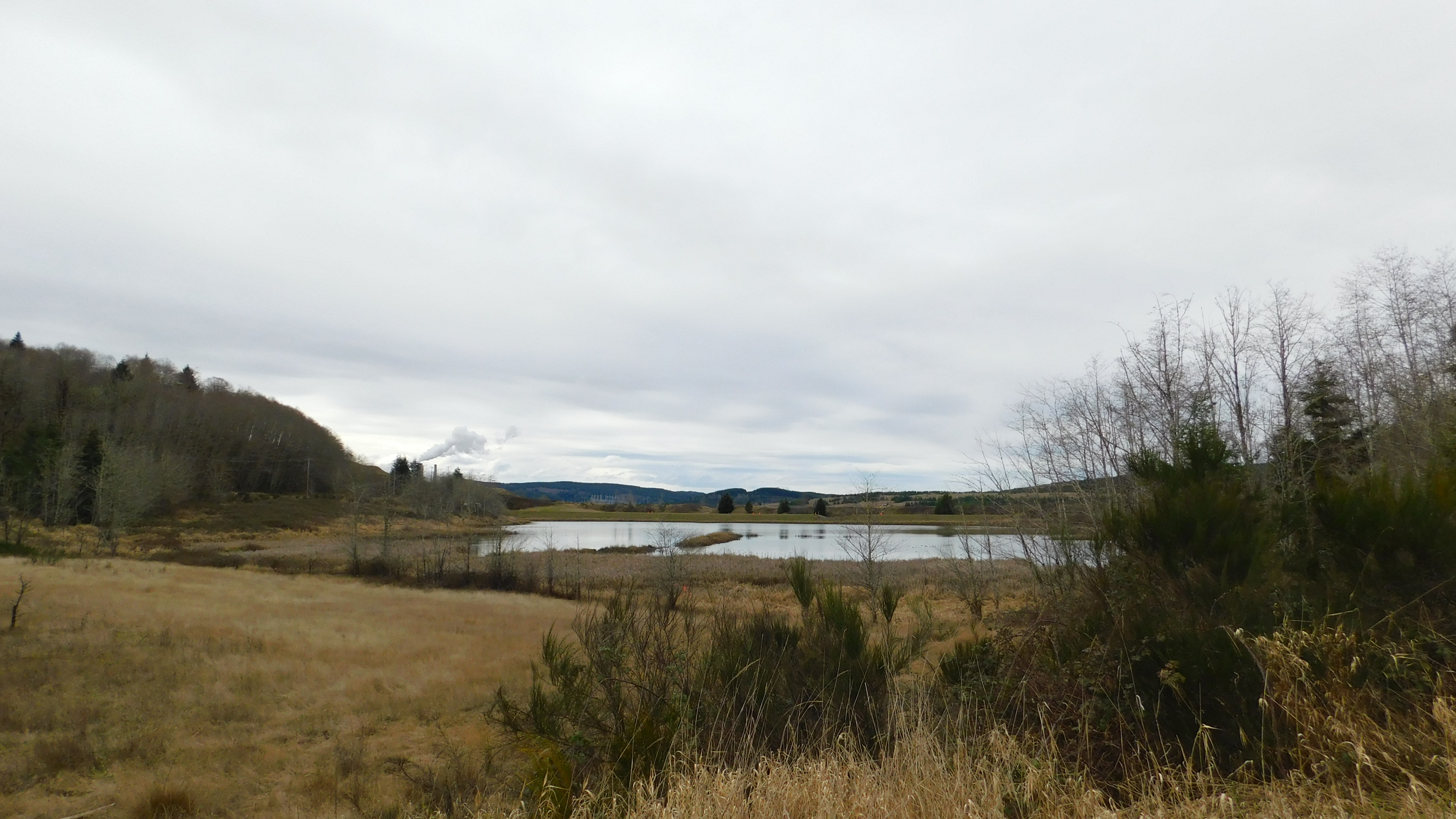
- Hanaford Valley and steam plant reservoir, near Tono, 2025
- Length: 14 miles (23 km) (approx.)
- Width: up to 1.0-mile (1.6 km)
- Area: 6,500 acres (2,600 ha) (approx.)

Geography
- Location: Lewis and Thurston counties
- Coordinates: 46°45′02″N 122°55′41″W
- Interactive map of Hanaford Valley

Hanaford Valley is a valley in the U.S. state of Washington. The landform, often divided geographically into three sections, spans from the Skookumchuck River east into central Lewis County. Parts of the valley also reside in Thurston County. A smaller, distinct valley known as Little Hanaford Valley is located to the south near Ham Hill and China Creek in Centralia.

The landform is bordered and interspersed with steep, rounded hills and numerous pocket valleys of fertile, but poorly drained soils. Coal seams were once abundant. Several streams course through Hanaford Valley and the region contains a variety of plant and bird species.

The valley was once home to the informal community of Hanaford and contained other towns, usually formed in response to coal mining or timber harvesting. Named after an early settler family, the area was used primarily by residents for farming and livestock.

== History ==
Hanaford Valley was named after Theophilus G. and Lucy (Hapwood) Hanaford, pioneer citizens. Early settlers included William Packwood of Packwood, Washington, Henry Shields, a county commissioner in the late 19th century, and Zaddock Null of Nulls Crossing. Pioneer Simon Plomodon, worked for the Hudson Bay Company as a beaver trapper; Austin Zenkner of Zenkner Valley settled the Lower Hanaford area.

As lands around Hanaford Creek, particularly near its conjunction with the Skookumchuck River, were a known habitat for beavers, early surveying maps referred to the valley as "Hanaford Swamp". The official name of Hanaford Valley was bestowed by valley settler, Robert Gibson, in 1878; Gibson insisted on a better name for the region based on the "beautiful and productive" lands in the valley.

Coal mining and timber became important economic factors of the valley during the late-19th century and into the next. Railroad lines under the Centralia Eastern Railroad led to mining operations under Mendota Coal and Coke Company. By the 1920s, the valley was also known for farming and livestock, while daily output of ore and timber continued to be produced in large quantities.

Towns in or near the valley created due to coal mining include Kopiah, Mendota, and Tono, which was informally created in the 1850s. The valley saw a resurgence in coal during the 1950s when additional veins were discovered. The efforts led to the construction of the Centralia Coal Mine, which opened in 1970, and the adjacent Centralia Power Plant, first announced in 1967 and completed in 1972.

== Geography ==
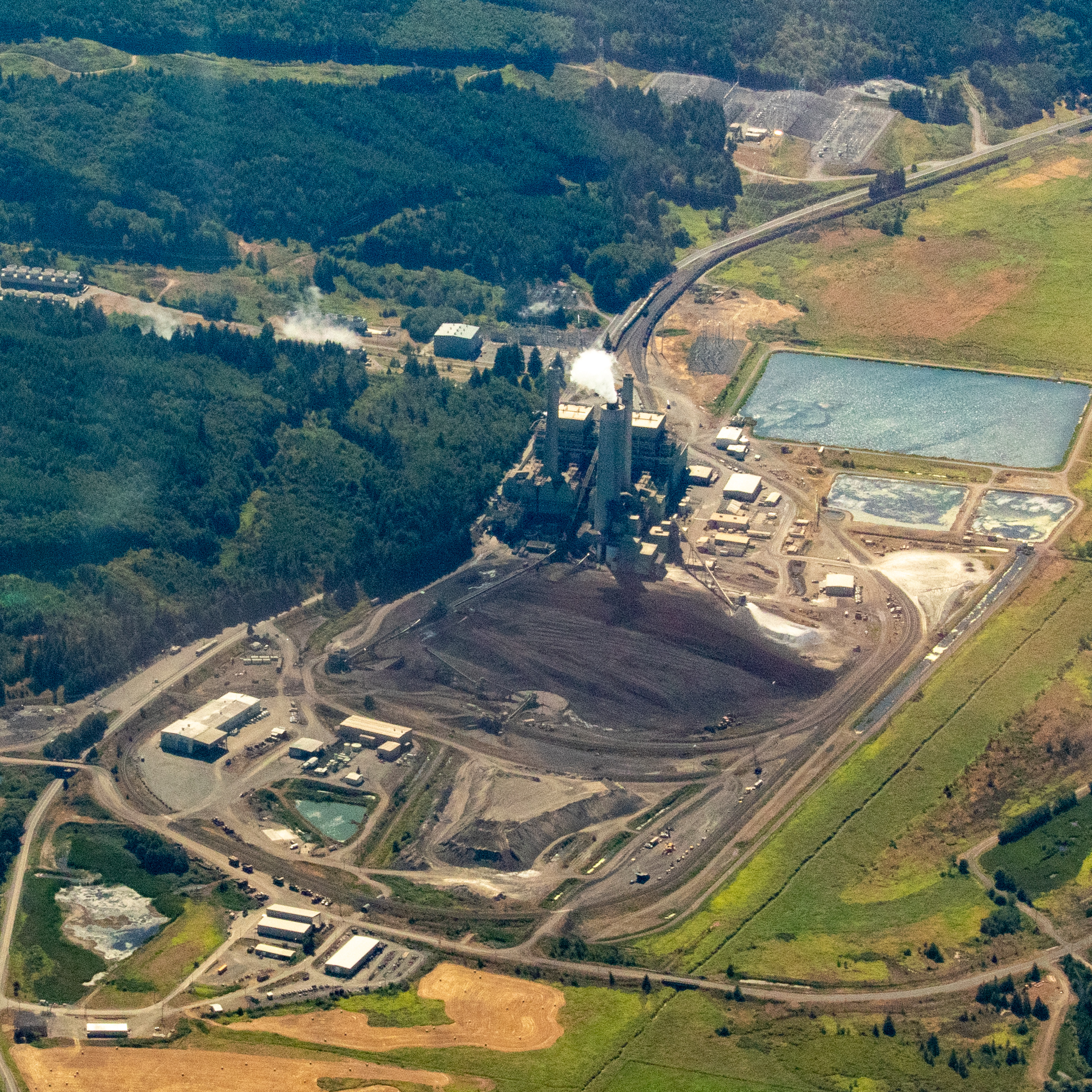
Centralia Power Plant in Hanaford Valley, 2023

The valley is divided into three sections, "Big Hanaford", the central portion and considered the largest of the region, "North Hanaford", located near the Lewis and Thurston county line, and "Little Hanaford" around Hanaford Creek. A landform near the Logan District east of Centralia, known as Vinegar Valley, was also known as Little Hanaford.

In 1897, the valley was measured to be roughly 14 miles (23 km) in length and its width spanning up to 0.75 miles (1.21 km), (Note: Other reports in the late 19th century vary in determination of the valley's size, including the width to be as much as 1-mile (1.6 km). See sources throughout the page for the discrepancies.) for a total of approximately 6,500 acres (2,600 ha). The topography of the area is recorded to contain steep but rounded hills interspersed with flat, poorly drained pocket valleys.

The valley contains several streams, including Hanaford Creek which courses from the former community of Coal Creek near the Lewis and Thurston county border to Wabash. The creek empties into Skookumchuck River outside of Centralia and is considered part of the Chehalis River watershed. South Hanaford Creek crosses the valley from the North Fork Newaukum River through Nulls Crossing to the north tributary of Hanaford Creek near the geographic midpoint of the valley.

Mount Rainier can be viewed from the valley. A surge reservoir is located near the steam plant.

Former communities or towns once located in the valley include Hanaford and Hurn, which was located approximately 10 miles (16 km) to 12 miles (19 km) up the landform from Centralia. Several coal mining towns, such as Kopiah, Mendota, and Tono, also existed either within or near the valley borders.

== Geology ==
Coal beds, considered to contain vast amounts of "good quality" lignite, were prominent throughout the valley, particularly in the watershed; one lignite vein was recorded up to 18 feet (5.5 m) thick. Gold was discovered in the valley in 1890.

The fertile soil consists of clay and sandy loam.

== Environment and ecology ==
Hanaford Valley contains Oregon ash forests with bleeding heart and sword fern. (Note: The exact species of bleeding heart and sword fern are not named in sourcing.) Bird species include buteos, American goldfinch, kinglets, meadowlarks, robins, Savannah sparrow, red-shafter flickers, swallows, vireos, warblers, and wrens.

During the years of settlement and beaver trapping in the mid-19th century, the valley was known to have thick underbrush, containing hardhack and white crab. Other noted species of trees were alder and willow. The streams in the valley were noted to contain trout.

== See also ==
- List of geographic features in Lewis County, Washington
- List of geographic features in Thurston County, Washington
