= Skookumchuck River =

River in Lewis and Thurston counties, Washington state

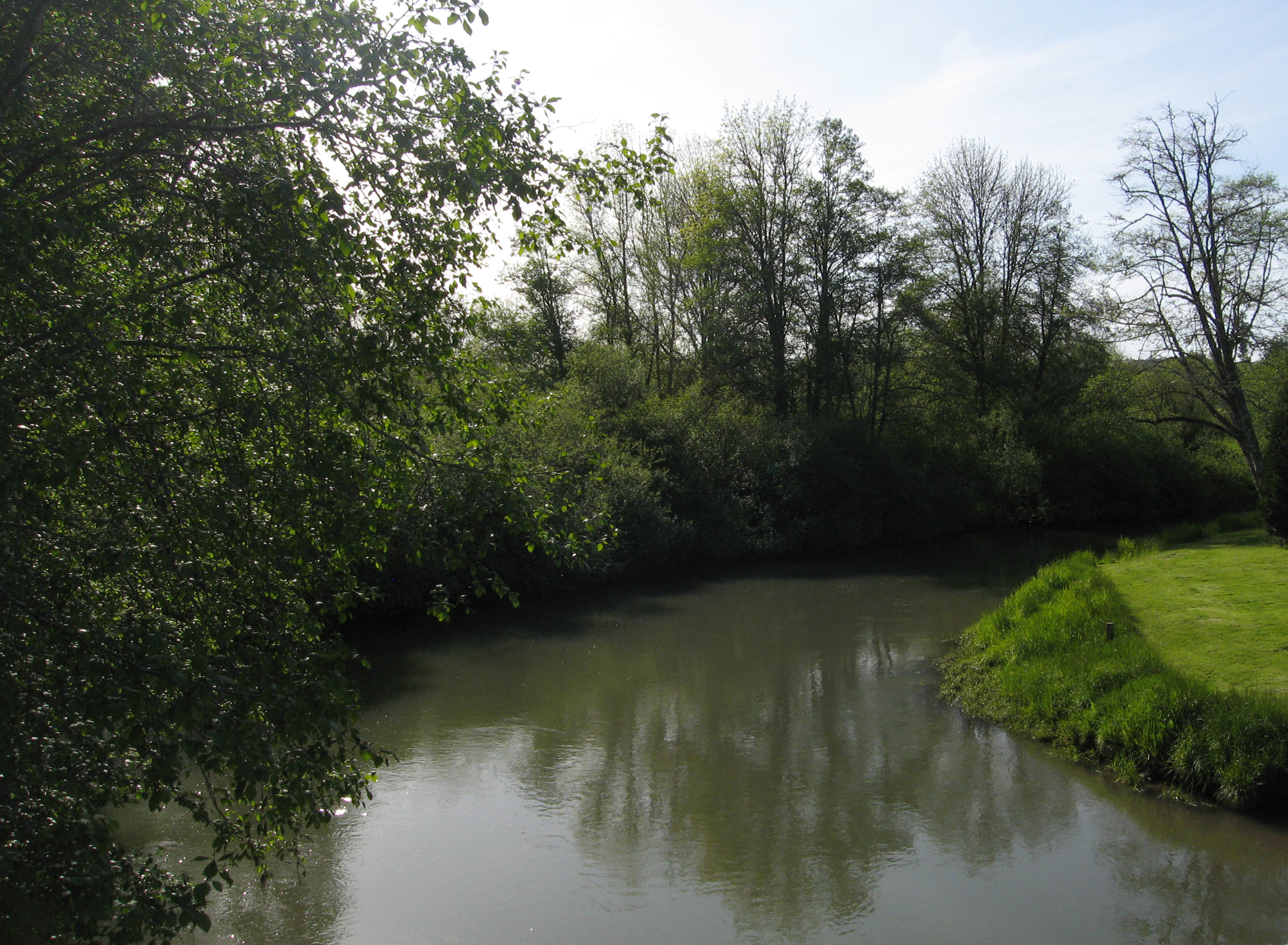
- Skookumchuck River in Bucoda, WA
- Etymology: Chinook Jargon, meaning "rapids" or "strong water"

Location
- Country: United States
- State: Washington
- County: Lewis, Thurston

Physical characteristics
- Source
  - coordinates: 46°42′28″N 122°26′41″W
- Mouth
  - coordinates: 46°43′10″N 122°58′55″W
- Length: 45 mi (72 km)
- Basin size: 181 sq mi (470 km^{2})
- Discharge
  - location: river mile 6.4 near Bucoda
  - average: 1,972 cu ft/s (55.8 m^{3}/s)
  - minimum: 40 cu ft/s (1.1 m^{3}/s)
  - maximum: 8,560 cu ft/s (242 m^{3}/s)

Basin features
- Geographic Names Information System: 1525884

The Skookumchuck River is a 45-mile (72 km) long river located in southwest Washington, United States. It is a tributary of the Chehalis River, which is the largest drainage basin located entirely within the state. The name, Skookumchuck, is derived from Chinook Jargon meaning "strong water" or rapids.

The river is home to an earthen embankment, the Skookumchuck Dam, which holds the Skookumchuck Reservoir, the largest water bank in the state. The waters are not for public use though the Quinault Indian Nation retains treaty rights in the dam's basin. The dam and reservoir are under the oversight of TransAlta and is of use to the company's coal plant in the Hanaford Valley which is slated to close in 2025.

The river has lost measurable aquatic and vegetative habitats due to both the dam and farming activity in the watershed. An ecosystem restoration project was established in 2024 to improve the waterway's biome.

== History ==
The name Skookumchuck derives from Chinook Jargon: in this context, "rapids". The word skookum means "strong" or "powerful", and chuck means "water". The Quinault Indian Nation, by way of the 1856 Treaty of Olympia, hold fishing rights on the river. Beginning in 2021, the river is allowed to be used as a year-round water bank and is the largest in the state, allowing a draw of 28,000 acre-feet of water per year.

== Course ==
The 45 mi (72 km)-long river begins with several tributaries in the Snoqualmie National Forest in the foothills of the Cascade Mountains, and flows west past the town of Bucoda, Washington to its confluence with the Chehalis River near Centralia, Washington. The Chehalis River watershed is the largest basin located within the state.

== Skookumchuck Dam ==
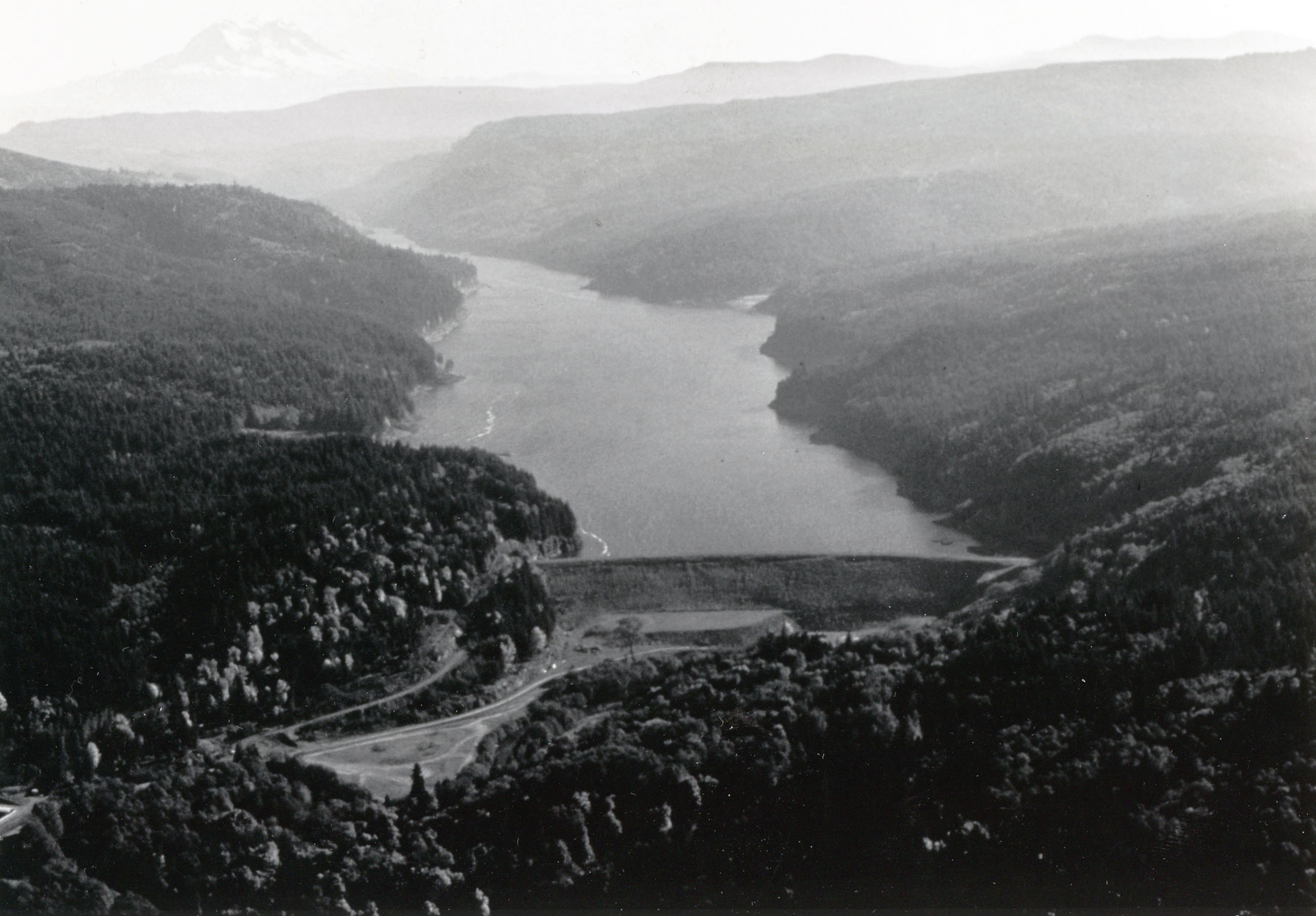
Aerial view, Skookumchuck Dam

The Skookumchuck Dam was built in 1970, creating the 4-mile (6.4 km) long Skookumchuck Reservoir. Its primary use is to provide water for the TransAlta coal plant and is not used for local or community water needs. The dam is an earthen bank structure measuring 190 feet (57.9 m) tall and spans 1,340 feet (408.4 m).

The dam and reservoir is overseen by TransAlta and, by contract, will continue in their oversight role after a nearby Hanaford Valley coal plant is closed at the end of 2025.

== Ecology and environment ==
The Skookumchuck River has lost several key components for a healthy river system due to human activities, such as farming and the dam. As of 2025, the aquatic habitat and species are considered to be lacking in diversity due to a lack of natural wood deposits and pool areas for fish. This leads to higher predation, leading fish using the river as a pass-through rather than a feed-and-rest area. Additionally, a network of dams, dikes, and removal of natural barriers has disconnected the floodplain, causing more erosion to the habitat as waters rush through the Skookumchuck during high rain and thaw events.

The loss of old-growth trees and lack of native plant species is also a concern. Non-native and invasive plants have caused riparian habitats to struggle as native plants are prevented from being reestablished. The decrease in native trees and shrubs, with deep roots and shade cover ideal for the banks of the river, lead to more erosion and subsequently a lack of food and shelter for aquatic animals. Species such as coho and steelhead are endemic to the river.

A project began in mid-2024 to repair human-caused issues of the Skookumchuck system and was authorized by the Chehalis Basin Strategy. Known as the Riverbend Project, the habitat restoration efforts are in partnership or support with various state agencies such as the Chehalis Basin Board, the Office of Chehalis Basin's Aquatic Species Restoration Program, the Thurston Conservation District, and the Washington Department of Fish and Wildlife. Further collaboration includes a mix of groups and professionals working in environmental conservation. The project has helped to protect the river from agricultural and farming impacts with a focus on surface runoff, and has included the removal of invasive plants, the planting of native vegetation, a reconnection of the floodplain by creating higher flow channels, the placement of logjams, and integrating both natural river habitats with that of farms by the practice of silvopasture.

The Riverbend Project is expected to continue possibly up to 2030, focusing on maintenance and monitoring of the system, adapting as needed. The $8 million effort is funded by a large association of partners in both Thurston County and Washington state.

== See also ==
- Flood history in Chehalis, Washington
- List of Chinook Jargon placenames
- List of geographic features in Lewis County, Washington
- List of geographic features in Thurston County, Washington
- List of Washington rivers
