= Tono, Washington =

- Ghost town
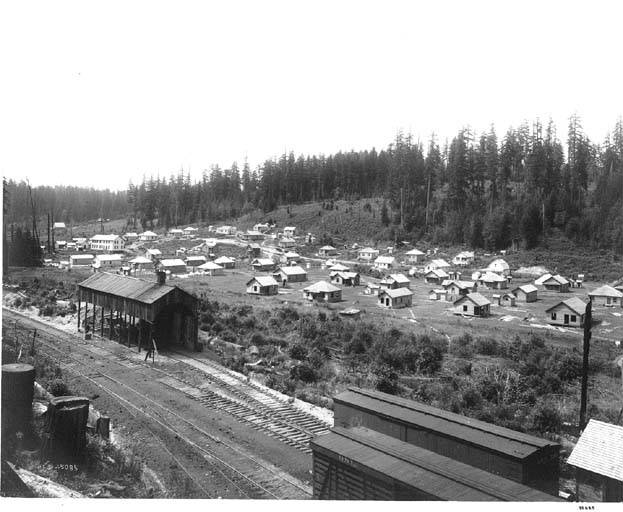
- Tono in 1909
- Interactive location map of Tono
- Coordinates: 46°46′28.3″N 122°49′28.3″W
- Country: United States
- State: Washington
- County: Thurston
- Founded: 1907
- Time zone: UTC-8 (Pacific (PST))
  - Summer (DST): UTC-7 (PDT)

Tono is a ghost town in southwest Washington in the United States. It was a company-owned mining town founded in 1907 by the Washington Union Coal Company, a subsidiary of the Union Pacific Railroad to supply coal for their steam locomotives. Tono was located in southern Thurston County about 20 miles (32 km) south of Olympia, Washington, 5 miles (8.0 km) south of Tenino, 2 miles (3.2 km) east of the town of Bucoda, at the end of a railroad spur.

== History ==
The town was named Tono in 1909 by one of the many Japanese railroad workers. Folk etymology states the name is a contraction of "ton of coal". As the region was primarily coal mining, Tono was served by a post office under the moniker, Coal Bank.

At its peak in the 1920s Tono had over 1,000 residents, 125 houses, a hotel, a hospital, a general store, and a school. The town flourished until 1932 when the railroads began switching to diesel locomotives; the Union Pacific then sold the mines to the Bucoda Mining Company. Afterwards the mines operated intermittently while most of the residents moved away. Many of the vacant houses were sold and moved to nearby communities. By 1950, there were only a few buildings and residents left in Tono. A family-owned coal mine was reported to still be in operation by 1966. The last full-time residents of Tono were John and Lempi Hirvela, who had moved there in 1923. Until 1976, the Hirvelas lived in the last surviving home, the mine superintendent's former residence.

In 1967, the Pacific Power & Light Company revived operations at the Tono field, now known as the Centralia Coal Mine. P.P. & L. purchased the property including the town site (and the Hirvela's home) and began strip mining the area to supply coal for the Centralia Power Plant in nearby Lewis County. Mining operations obliterated most of the former town site in the 1980s. All that remains of Tono are a few overgrown foundations.

Three coal carts thought to come from Tono's Black Diamond coal mine were purchased, via donations, by the city of Tenino in 2021. The carts were donated to the Tenino Depot Museum with future plans to have them displayed.
