= Mendota, Washington =

Ghost town in Washington (state)

- Ghost town
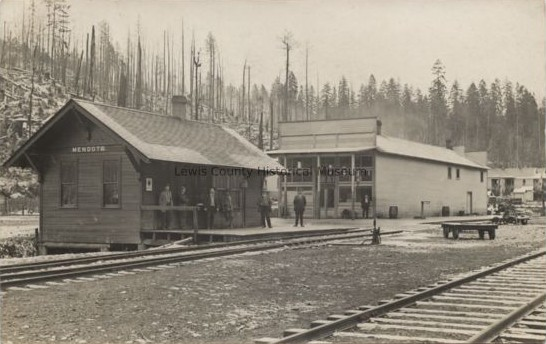
- Mendota depot and post office, ca. 1913

- Location within Washington (state) Location within the United States
- Coordinates: 46°43′31″N 122°47′25″W
- Country: United States
- State: Washington
- County: Lewis
- Established: 1909
- Time zone: UTC-8 (Pacific (PST))
  - Summer (DST): UTC-7 (PDT)
- GNIS feature ID: 1506624

Mendota is an extinct town in Lewis County, in the U.S. state of Washington. The community began as a mining town, growing to include a post office, hotel, and school in the early 20th century.

A destructive fire in 1926 closed mining operations and the town began to wane. A lone ranch remained by the 1950s. Attempts to reinvigorate coal mining in the region did not materialize and by the early 1970s, buildings were in disrepair and the townsite had begun to be lost to encroaching plants and wildlife. No buildings were standing by 1979.

== History ==
The community was built after the creation of the Centralia Eastern rail line, which terminated at the site. The town was first known as Packwood, after William Packwood, who built a homestead and farm in the area in 1883. The community took its name from the Mendota Coal and Coke Company, which incorporated in October 1907. The company immediately began mining operations in the area after leasing over 9,000 acres (3,600 ha) from the landholdings of Western Railway and Lumber Company. (Note: Landholdings for the Mendota Coal and Coke Company were also reported to be near 10,000 acres (4,000 ha).)

The company town of Mendota, described as being within a "virgin forest", was created in late 1907 or by early 1908; Mendota was originally created as a dry town. Tracks for the Centralia Eastern Railroad were built into the new town and a depot was built. A post office given the name Mendota was established in 1909 and remained in operation until 1923.

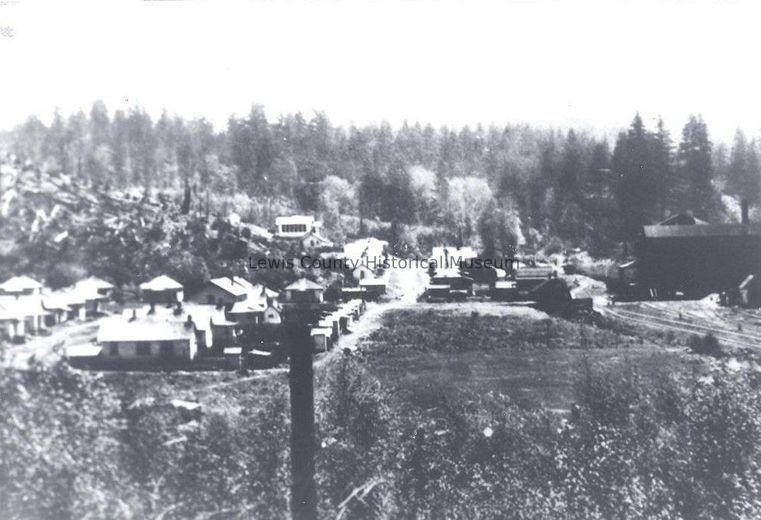
Mendota, ca. 1915

By 1914, the town was recorded to have a three-story hotel with a 100-accommodation dining room, a community bath house, and a general store. Approximately sixty homes, as well as a school which also served as a church, had been constructed. Each home had running water; fire hydrants were placed outside of each property.

Mendota peaked with no additional home construction; a top count of employees of the coal company reached 200. A large, underground fire in 1926 shut down the plant and by the 1950s, Mendota was considered a former community with the area supporting a lone sheep ranch. Despite renewed hope of reviving Mendota after findings of additional coal beds in 1951, the community became a ghost town and was a site for the placement of a Pacific Power & Light steam-powered plant in 1969.

By 1972, Mendota was described as containing ruins, with homes and buildings falling down though the school structure remained. Flourishing flora and fauna had already begun to take over the site, though some roads were still accessible. No structures were reported standing by 1979.

== Geography ==
Mendota was located around Packwood Creek near Kopiah, Washington, northeast of Centralia.
