= Kopiah, Washington =

Ghost town in Washington (state)

- Ghost town
- Location within Washington (state) Location within the United States
- Coordinates: 46°42′21″N 122°48′28″W
- Country: United States
- State: Washington
- County: Lewis
- Established: 1906

Population (1930)
  - Total: 115
- Time zone: UTC-8 (Pacific (PST))
  - Summer (DST): UTC-7 (PDT)

Kopiah was a company town located in Hanaford Valley, Lewis County, Washington. The community was situated approximately 8 miles (13 km) southeast of Centralia.

== History ==
A mining operation began in Kopiah in 1900 and is considered to be the earliest, large-scale production efforts of coal mining in the Hanaford Valley. Known as the Wilson Mine, the company town of Kopiah was created by 1903 and included a hotel, school, and several stores. The community had electric lights and mine employees were reported as the highest paid laborers of "any company" in the United States.

The 1910 census showed 298 individuals, but the 1930 census showed only 115.

A post office operated from 1906 to 1928.

== See also ==
- List of ghost towns in Washington
