= Centralia Power Plant =

Coal and natural gas power plant in Washington state

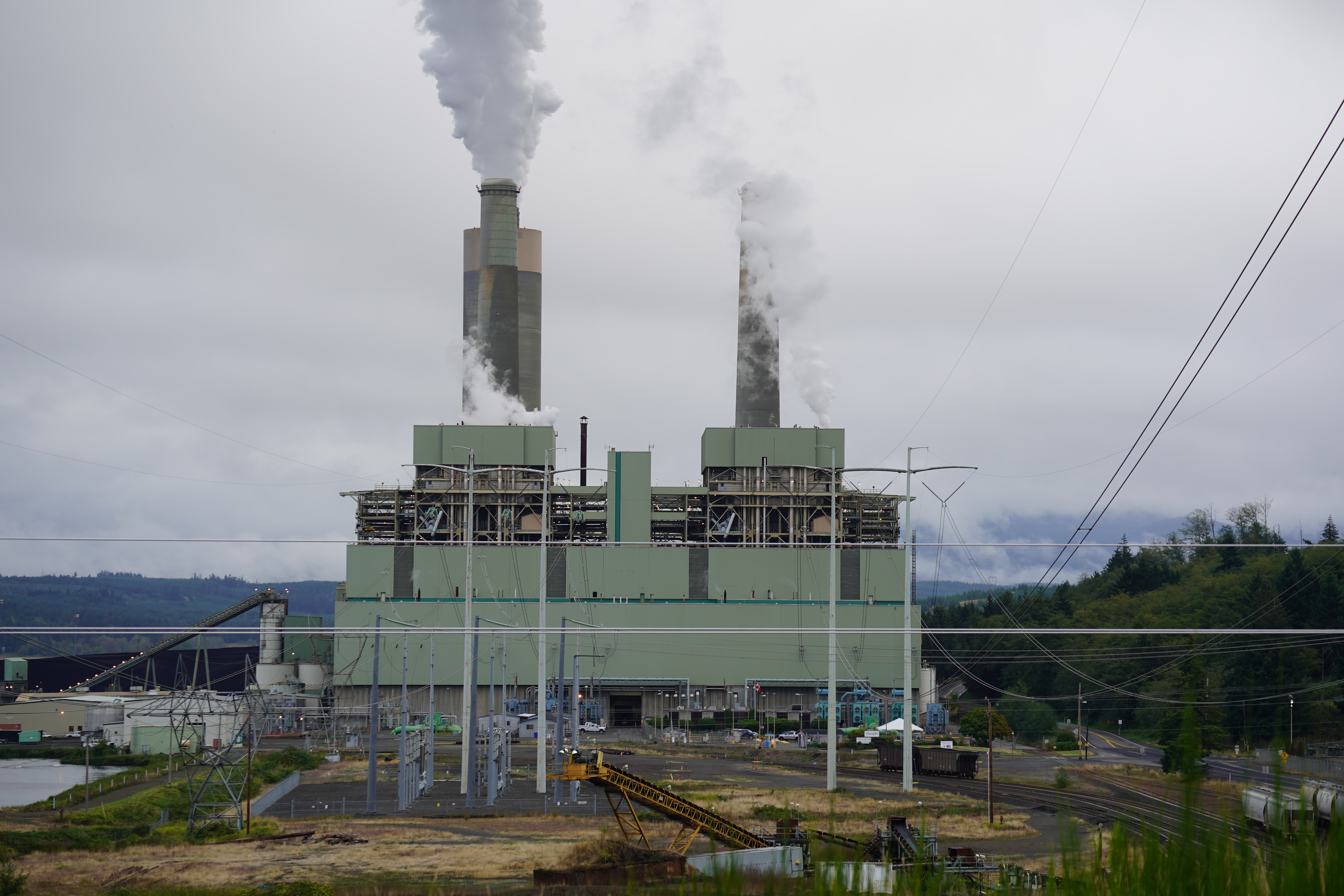
- Centralia Power Plant, 2020
- Country: United States
- Location: Hanaford Valley, Lewis County near Centralia, Washington
- Coordinates: 46°45′20″N 122°51′36″W
- Status: Open
- Construction began: 1968
- Commission date: 1972 (coal); 2002 (natural gas)
- Owner: TransAlta Corporation

Thermal power station
- Primary fuel: Subbituminous coal
- Secondary fuel: Natural gas
- Cooling towers: 2
- Cooling source: Artificial ponds; Skookumchuck Dam

Power generation
- Nameplate capacity: 729.9 MW

External links
- Website: TransAlta - Centralia Coal Plant
- Commons: Related media on Commons

The Centralia Power Plant, known also as the Centralia Coal Plant, Centralia Steam Plant, or Centralia Steam-Electric Plant, is a coal-fired power plant supplemented with a natural gas power plant known as the Big Hanaford Power Plant. The combined coal and natural gas facility is located east of Centralia in the Hanaford Valley of Lewis County, Washington.

The plant, owned by TransAlta, is situated on 11,000 acres (4,500 ha) and at its peak generated enough energy to power Los Angeles. The two-boiler, fossil fuel power station was constructed beginning in 1968. Both boilers were fully operational by 1972. The Centralia Coal Mine was opened in 1970 to provide the fuel source for the plant. The Skookumchuck Dam was built to provide water as a cooling source. The natural gas facility opened in 2002.

The coal mine was closed in 2006 due to operational costs. Following in 2011, a Washington state law was signed to permanently shutter the steam plant. The first boiler unit was shut down in 2020. The Centralia Power Plant, the last commercial energy production facility to be powered by coal in the state, was expected to close as a coal powered plant by the end of 2025 but was ordered to remain operational through mid-June 2026 by the Department of Energy.

TransAlta announced in December 2025 that the second coal boiler of the plant was to be converted into a natural gas-burning unit. Planned to be running by 2028, the updated unit is contractually obligated to remain operational through 2044.

== History ==
=== Construction and beginning operations ===
In December 1951, an estimated 1.75 billion metric tons (1.75×10^{9} t) of bituminous coal was discovered in Lewis County near Centralia by the United States Department of the Interior. The Centralia Coal Mine began as part of the construction of the steam-electric power plant, in Hanaford Valley, which was first made public in January 1967 in the local newspaper, The Chronicle. The facility was considered to be more cost-effective than a nuclear power plant and a state representative declared that it was "about time" that the coal fields in Lewis County were to be utilized. Other local leaders, including Governor Daniel J. Evans, welcomed the news, agreeing on resource usage while also focusing on economic prosperity for the region.

The construction of a one-gigawatt, steam-generated plant, to be built by Pacific Power & Light Company of Portland and Spokane-based Washington Water Power Company, was officially announced in May 1967. The proposal, estimated at first to cost $140 million, also disclosed the construction of the Skookumchuck Dam, the reservoir to be used for cooling purposes at the plant. The first efforts on the project began with road construction to the site the prior month.

Under oversight of Bechtel Corporation, construction of a first boiler unit began on June 13, 1968. A ceremonial groundbreaking was held on August 23, 1968, attended by Governor Evans, other state officials, and a crowd of 500 people. Governor Evans pushed a button that activated the "first" pouring of concrete at the site. The cost of the plant was revised to $206 million with a 700-megawatt capacity of the first unit; a second unit was to be built later when additional was to be required. The design and construction of the new plant were by Stone & Webster and ABB Environmental Systems.

In anticipation of the electrical facility, Bonneville Power Administration began efforts by August 1968 to upgrade the electrical grid within Centralia and Chehalis, Washington. (Note: Centralia and Chehalis are known as the Twin Cities. See respective articles or sourcing throughout the page.) Announcements at the time also reported that the plant was to produce up to 1.4 gigawatts once both units were operational. An untitled, multi-part documentary was filmed during the early construction phases of the mine and plant. Also focusing on the concerns of environmental impacts, early screenings in 1970 were hosted in Centralia; reviews were considered positive and ecological concerns abated by the positive tone of the movie. (Note: The managing editor of Centralia's newspaper, The Daily Chronicle, suggested the title of the documentary to be, "From Old Bones To Hot Watts", due to the plant burning fossil fuels to produce electricity.)

The first turbine began operations on August 6, 1971, powered by steam generated by burning oil. Coal was first used in the furnace on August 14 and a dedication ceremony was held the following month. In honor of the steam plant's opening, and the Centralia Coal Mine's connection to the project, the Centralia newspaper, The Daily Chronicle, published a 52-page special known as the "Steam Plant Dedication Edition" on September 24, 1971.

The second boiler was officially lit for inspection in late-August 1972, and the entire plant was considered effectively complete and on schedule, with operations at full capacity, by early September. Approximately 1,200 people were employed during the four-year construction phase which was built at a finalized cost of $230 million.

The construction of the plant was reported to provide Centralia, Chehalis, and surrounding communities with noticeable increases to the local economy, particularly in mortgage lending and multiple infrastructure improvement projects despite an era of economic stagflation. Banks reported savings deposit increases during the construction including one bank that reported a jump of $1.5 million in 1970. Sales receipts were also reported as amplified, with businesses reporting increases between 18% and 25% annually.

=== 21st century and closure ===
By 2000, the plant was noted for a more than 5-year stretch without a "time-loss" accident; total employees numbered were listed at approximately 120. Including employees at the Centralia Coal Mine, jobs via TransAlta in Lewis County totaled 680 people. Employment numbers at the plant were listed at 225 in 2006. The plant, at its peak, was considered the largest employer in Lewis County.

TransAlta constructed the 248 MW, natural-gas-powered Big Hanaford power plant on the grounds of the coal plant. Completed on time and on budget, the $215-million plant went online on August 12, 2002.

In 2006, the adjacent Centralia Coal Mine was closed due to operating costs, eliminating approximately 600 jobs. In 2011, a bill signed in 2011 by governor Christine Gregoire, the TransAlta Energy Transition Bill (TAETB) also known as Senate Bill 5769, authored in an agreement to permanently close the Centralia Power Plant in 2025. A coal boiler was shut down in 2020 as part of beginning phase of the closure.

Multi-million-dollar funds, to be used for clean energy investments and programs for the Centralia community and throughout the state, were required as a part of the TAETB bill. The bill required a $55 million "community transition fund" set aside by TransAlta. An additional fund up to $30 million was initiated to lower nitrogen oxide levels beginning in 2013; the plant has already begun an upgrade to reduce mercury emissions beginning in 2012. TransAlta created a $20 million fund for training and educational work programs for remaining employees of the plant. Part of a larger Centralia Coal Transition Grants initiative, other grants include millions for energy efficiency and technology for nearby communities and schools. The land at the site has slowly been reclaimed for public and commercial use, including the planting of trees and maintaining wetland areas.

By 2025, the plant was the last commercial coal-fired power plant remaining in the state. The last load of coal burned at the Centralia Power Plant was recorded to have been in mid-December 2025.

=== Conversion to natural gas plant ===
In December 2025, TransAlta announced that a 16-year contractual agreement was signed with Puget Sound Energy to convert the second coal boiler into a natural gas burning unit. (Note: As of the 2025 announcement to convert the plant to natural gas, the first boiler unit was not planned to be reconfigured for such use.) Providing up to 700 megawatts, the conversion was planned to be functional by 2028 and is to remain operational through 2044. The continuing use of fossil-fuel burning for power at the plant was deemed necessary to avoid brownouts and blackouts until planned renewable energy projects in the state could be completed. Cost estimates are reported to be approximately $600 million and the project is expected to begin in early 2027. At the time of the announcement, the project lacked full approval and subsequent permits from regulatory agencies.

In late-December, TransAlta began efforts for environmental cleanup of the site and surrounding area, including mitigation of air, sediment and soil, and groundwater contamination. The initiative was begun under an order by the Washington State Department of Ecology (WSDOE); the agency will have oversight over the project.

In July 2026, TransAlta was officially authorized by the WSDOE to begin the transition of the site for use as a peaker plant. Under the agreement, TransAlta is required to spend millions of dollars per year for renewable energy projects in Lewis and Thurston counties; the amount fluctuates depending on the annual emissions of the Centralia plant. The contract also stipulates that the natural gas facility will close operations by 2044 in order to comply with a statewide mandate for the cessation of the burning of fossil fuels for energy production.

In opposition to the gas generating facility, a group known as Washington Conservation Action noted that the plant could possibly become a larger polluter than the Cherry Point Refinery. Additionally, costs associated with the efforts were higher than initially planned as well as unusually large compared to other similar conversion operations. The group also cited permits sought by TransAlta in regards to planned capacity of up to 59%, beyond the normal 5 to 15% range for a peaker plant.

=== Federal orders to maintain coal-burning operations, 2025-2026 ===
In mid-December 2025, the United States Department of Energy (DOE) announced through an emergency order under the Federal Power Act that TransAlta was to “take all measures necessary” to provide “affordable, reliable and secure electricity” by the continued operations of the remaining coal-burning unit of the Centralia Power Plant until March 16, 2026. The BPA was required to "facilitate transmission" and the plant was no longer allowed to be referred to as a “capacity resource", otherwise known as an energy facility that can increase or decrease output on demand.

Other coal-burning power plants in the country, also planned to be deactivated, had previously been given similar, temporary orders. The DOE cited two executive orders that stated concerns over national security issues and energy emergencies. Additionally, the DOE mentioned the coal plant's retirement could potentially lead to rolling blackouts during extreme weather events in the state. Also noted by the agency was a lack of renewable energy sourcing coupled with expected electricity demand driven by data centers and industrial expansion.

Opposition to the DOE announcement noted a potential increase in pollution in the state and higher electricity prices to residents in Washington. Other issues of an exhausted coal supply and limited staff at the plant due to the planned closure were also addressed. Additionally, there were no existing contracts to supply the plant with coal and outside of sales to short-term markets, there were no agreements with any power company or similar entity to purchase power from the plant if it continued to operate. The Washington Utilities and Transportation Commission found contradictory data to the information provided under the DOE order and stated that there was no basis of an "immediate threat" of an energy shortage. The order was further opposed by several state officials, including Governor Bob Ferguson, considering the directive to be based on exploitation of federal laws; concerns of an energy shortage were also dismissed. Environmental groups noted the DOE order to be illegal and was meant to "prop up" the coal industry. While also agreeing on pollution concerns, the organizations, which included the Sierra Club, estimated the continuing operation of the plant to cost $65 million per year. As a priority, TransAlta announced that they were to continue converting the coal unit to a natural gas burning facility while "evaluating" the DOE order.

As the order was expiring in March 2026, DOE ordered the plant to remain operational until mid-June; operations of the plant were to be under management of two grid operators, Gridforce and Southwest Power Pool. Because the region did not experience an energy shortage, the plant had not been called upon to operate by the grid operator and generated just 8 MWh during the first DOE order. (Note: Monitoring of the coal plant from mid-December 2025 into March 2026 noted that no power produced at the facility entered the regional power grid.) Governor Ferguson also signed legislation that revoked the plant's exemption from state’s emissions trading program, Cap-and-Invest, and sales taxes on coal.

TransAlta reported in an April 2026 filing with the Federal Energy Regulatory Commission (FERC) that in attempting to comply with the federal order for the plant to remain open, the company had spent approximately $20 million. Over half of the costs were associated with the purchase and preparation of new coal stocks and diesel fuel. TransAlta began requesting reimbursement of the operating costs from FERC that same month. In June, the DOE issued a third order to have the power plant remain open, extending the request into September.

== Generating units ==
=== Coal-fired ===
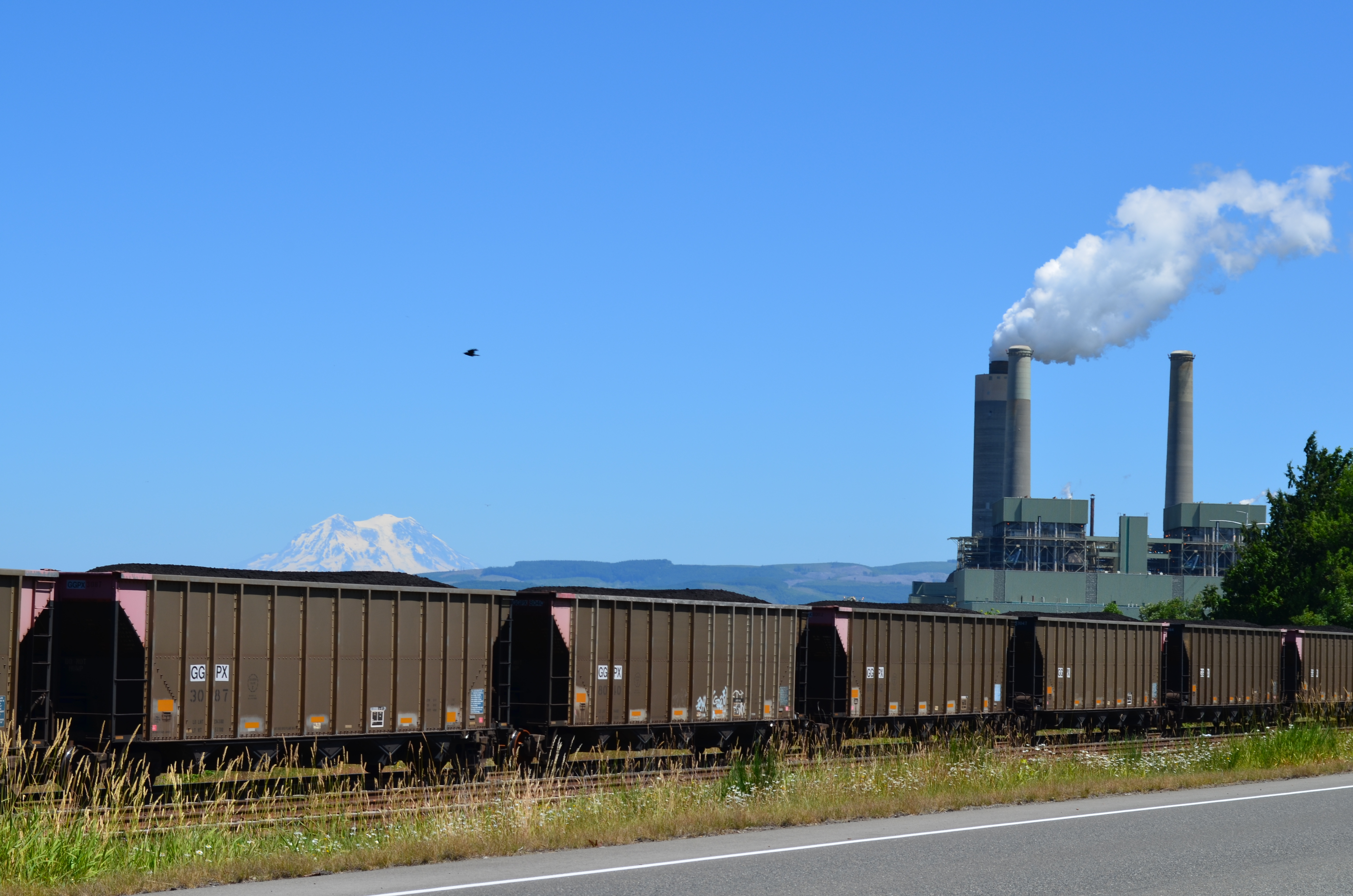
Plant and coal train, 2013

The two identical coal-fired generating units have a combined capacity of 1,340 MW. The coal plant is overseen by a one-room operation center. Coal is stored next to the plant in 400-metric-ton (400 t) silos; the capacity is enough to run operations for up to eight hours.

The coal facility is 23 stories tall and the design is considered "utilitarian". Catwalks, conveyor belts, girders, and thousands of feet of pipe are exposed.

When constructed, each boiler facility stood 233 feet (71.0 m) tall and had a footprint of 25,600 square feet (2,380 m^{2}). Each foundation required 12,000 cubic feet (340 m^{3}) of concrete. Two smokestacks, built with a pollution-control system to contain fly ash, each measured over 470 feet (143.3 m) in height. At the plant's beginnings, more than 20,000 metric tons (20,000 t) of coal were estimated to be used per day.

Approximately 20,000 volts of electricity are generated in between two turbines, with steam reaching as high as 1,005 °F (541 °C) which produces 2,900 pounds per square inch (20,000 kPa) of pressure. The steam is recycled into the boiler system. Per minute, 6,000 US gallons (23,000 L; 5,000 imp gal) of water through the condenser and cooling tower system are released into the air. The boilers can be reactivated, in the event of a shutdown, by a relighting oil system.

Originally, two computerized 22 foot (6.7 m)-long, 7 foot (2.1 m)-tall "boiler-turbine-generator" boards, located in a separate control room, oversaw the operations of each boiler. Another panel controlled coal handling operations and the command center could also receive telemetry on the Skookumchuck Dam. Television cameras, used to monitor diesel fuel and water usage of the boilers, provided live-feeds to the control room.

In 1996, the expense to produce one kilowatt hour of electricity was an average of 2.125 cents. Dropping in 1999 to 1.9 cents, of which approximately 90% of the rate was due to the price of coal, the plant was considered among the most expensive to operate under PacifiCorp's portfolio.

Following the 2011 agreement to close the plant, the first boiler was shut down in 2020, with the second unit planned for closure in 2025. A schedule of emissions reductions were put in place to be met as the closure date nears. The Washington State Senate approved the deal with a 36–13 vote. To complete this transition, TransAlta received an expedited permit, and is also exempt from any Environmental Impact Assessment that would otherwise be required.

The energy produced until its closure is used by Puget Sound Energy and according to 2022 figures, 14.5% of PSE's electric load came from the TransAlta coal plant, enough to supply power to 300,000 homes.

=== Gas-fired ===
In 2002, the coal plant capacity was supplemented with the construction of the Big Hanaford power plant. When completed, the additional facility was estimated to provide electricity for up to 300,000 homes in the Pacific Northwest.

Containing five natural-gas-fired units, four units were 50-MWe gas-turbine (GT) units and the fifth was a 68-MWe steam-cycle unit. The entire arrangement is known as combined-cycle 4-on-1 where the exhaust from the 4 GTs creates steam via heat recovery steam generators to power a single steam turbine. In 2014, the gas-fired portion of the facility was removed from the coal-plant footprint and parted out to various buyers.

The combined output of both the coal and natural-gas units were considered to be able to power the city of Los Angeles. In 2011, approximately 10% of the state's power was generated by the facility.

=== Architects and contractors ===
The two coal smokestacks were built and designed by M.W. Kellogg Company.

Landscaping around the coal plant was overseen by Jane Garrison, a graduate with a landscape architect degree from the University of Oregon. Garrison designed and managed the project by herself, focusing on using "nothing foreign to the valley". (Note: The source mentioning Jane Garrison's landscaping project referred to her as a "girl" and "miss", while also noting her profession as a landscape architect was "an unusual field for a woman".)

== Fuel supply ==
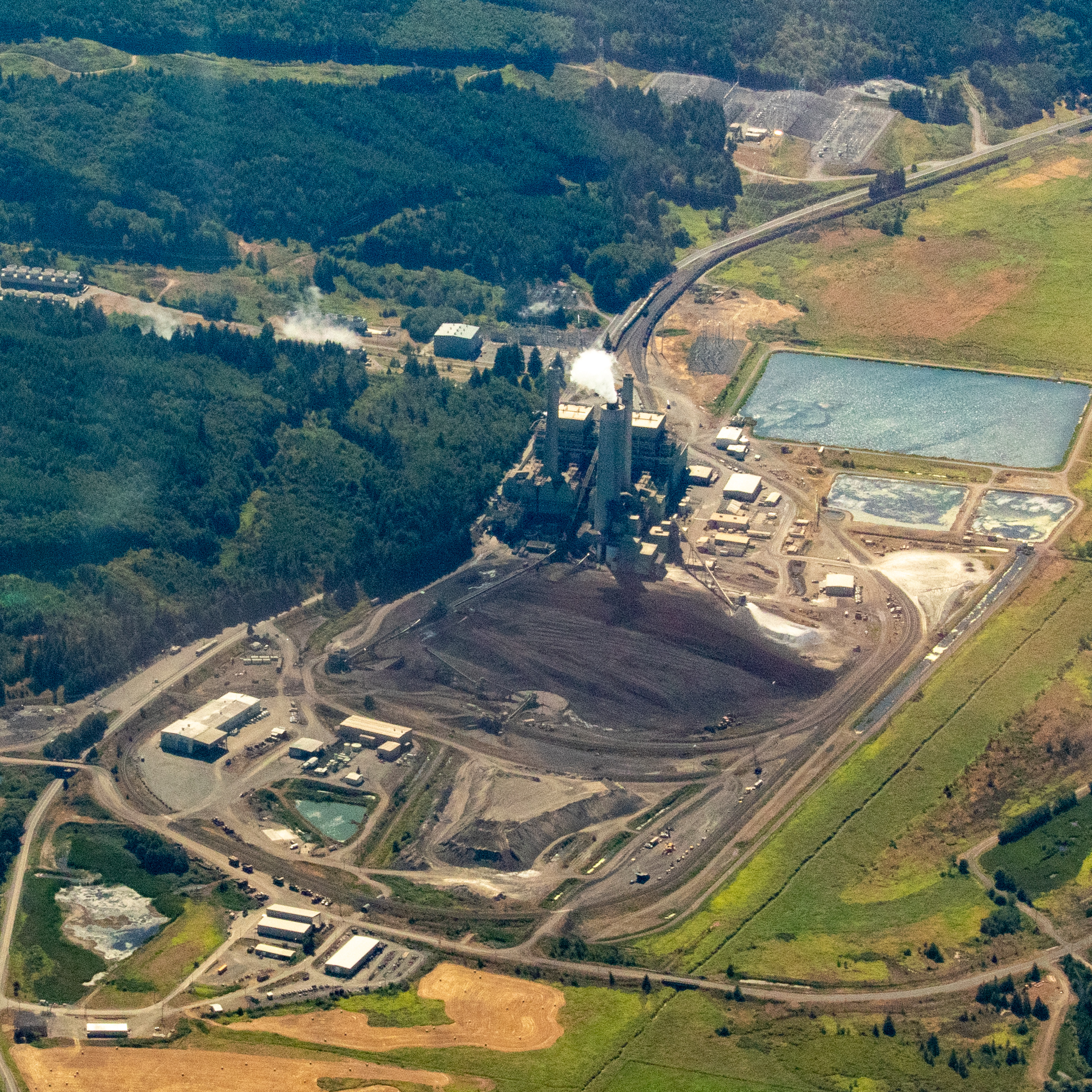
Plant site, 2023

Seventy percent of sub-bituminous coal used by the plant was delivered by truck from the nearby Centralia Coal Mine, which was a strip mine and the largest coal mine in the state of Washington, until it closed down on November 27, 2006. Additional loads were delivered directly from the mine via a 2-mile-long (3.2 km) conveyor-belt system.

By the 1990s, the plant has imported coal from other sites when needed. In 1994, approximately 1.2 million metric tons (1,200,000 t) of coal shipped from other mines other than the Centralia Coal Mine. In 1999, the plant was recorded to burn through 5 million metric tons (5,000,000 t) of coal; approximately 80% was delivered from the nearby mine.

Coal from the Powder River Basin in Montana and Wyoming has been transported by rail to be burned at the plant since 1989, but was only used to supplement Centralia Coal Mine coal until 2006. By 2008, the plant was burning 100% Powder River Basin coal. Rail upgrades and SO_{2} scrubber upgrades to ensure the plant releases less pollution would have ensured the operation ran for at least another 15–20 years. Before the closure of unit 1, Centralia burned coal from about nine 110-car coal trains each week (i.e. 990 full coal cars).

== Environmental and public impacts ==
=== 20th century ===
Air pollution scientists from the Washington State University College of Agricultural, Human, and Natural Resource Sciences began a 3-year study in January 1968 focusing on air quality levels and to record various meteorological data, using the information to compare against pollution levels after the coal plant was operational. The survey was done under order from both Pacific Power and Light and Washington Water Power Company. The seasonal growing patterns of native plant life around the site was also studied.

The open pits of the mine were proposed as a landfill site by Governor Evans in 1971 with environmental and geologic studies immediately undertaken. Solid waste was to be gathered from as far north as Everett and perhaps as far south as Portland.

A hill was excavated in 1968 to provide the location of the steam plant, and the existing Hanaford Valley Road was moved immediately next to the site. By the late 1970s, the coal plant had twice been outfitted with electrostatic precipitators. The first system, costing $12 million, reduced dust particles by 95%. The $43 million second precipitator further lowered dust contamination with an efficiency of up to 99.8%.

The Centralia Steam-Electric Plant, in 1992 and 1993, reported emissions of 1.39 pounds of sulfur dioxide per one British thermal unit and was expected in 1996 to produce 84,000 metric tons (84,000 t) of the gas. (Note: Actual sulfur dioxide emissions for 1996 was listed at over 78,000 metric tons (78,000 t).) The high emission numbers were found during a required review of the plant under the Clean Air Act of 1990. The review was undertaken by the Southwest Air Pollution Control (Agency) Authority (SWAPCA). The agency, in February 1995, published recommended upgrades and pollution-control methods at the site. By August, the authority ordered the plant to reduce emissions by half.

In December 1996, an agreement with federal and state agencies authored in plans to build or add pollution controlling systems at the plant. An additional smokestack was to be constructed and scrubbers installed. The upgraded emission-control systems, estimated to cost more than $250 million, were projected to lower the release of sulfur dioxide pollutants to as low as 7,000 metric tons (7,000 t) annually. The plant, known at the time as the second-leading polluting coal plant in the state, received tax breaks in 1997 to offset the project, estimated at $130 million over three decades. (Note: The 1997 state legislative package that helped to authorize the tax break was known as House Bill 1257. It passed 96-0. The primary sponsor of the bill was Richard DeBolt, a representative from Chehalis who three years later was hired by TransAlta as an "external relations director".) The coal plant was expected to close if the agreement failed to be authorized.

The tax subsidies were not well-received, and competing bills to fund the emission upgrade project were introduced in both the state senate and house. Debate over the bills usually included Centralia residents, as well as plant and mine employees, supporting the tax breaks, voicing concerns over job losses; opponents were concerned over environmental factors and the use of taxpayer money to fund a corporate project. A following order in February 1998 by the SWAPCA to again lower emissions was originally agreed to by PacifiCorp. The company asked for a nine-month delay to implement their efforts after a single individual, concerned the agreement did not go far enough in regards to environmental protections, appealed the order; PacifiCorp cited the delay's purpose due to a lack of compliance and contractual obligations, as well as protecting its investment already spent on the emissions project. The decision on the delay was also delayed, not heard by the SWAPCA committee until January 1999 and not formally voted on until April that year.

=== 21st century ===
TransAlta was fined $3,500 by the Southwest Clean Air Agency for exceeding air-pollution standards for one hour; the company self-reported the incident. In April 2002, TransAlta was fined $24,000 by the Washington State Department of Ecology (WSDOE) due to clay- and mud-contaminated stormwater runoff from collection ponds into nearby Hanaford Creek. The silt was considered hazardous to the local aquatic habitat, particularly to salmon spawning grounds. The company immediately announced projects to prevent further incidents from occurring, constructing booms and screens and removing a hillside to prevent additional soil particles from entering the pools.

The Centralia Power Plant had been considered to be a leading cause of air pollution at Mount Rainier National Park. When TransAlta bought the plant in 2000, it agreed to reduce emissions. It installed $200 million worth of scrubbers on the plant, which were purchased from ABB Environmental Systems. The project was completed by September 2002; an open house at the plant, attended by approximately 2,500 people, was held to dedicate the scrubbers as well as to celebrate the start-up of the Big Hanaford addition. TransAlta also received an ISO 14001 certification recognizing the company's two-year achievement in developing an environmental management system at the plant.

The scrubbers, using a daily application of a wet-ground limestone slurry, absorbed sulfur oxide particulates, reducing airborne levels by 90 percent. The chemical process, along with additional oxidation, created calcium sulfite, also known as gypsum. The gypsum was removed and used in the production of sheetrock at the Georgia Pacific plant in Tacoma. The addition of the pollution controls allowed the Centralia plant to be considered one of the cleanest coal plants in North America. Sulfur emissions of the natural-gas facility were considered low; specifically designed turbines, along with a catalytic conversion system, helped to minimize nitrogen oxide pollution.

Between 2010 and 2012, the Centralia Power Plant was offline for an average of 4 months of each year. In March 2009, a proposed agreement between TransAlta and the WSDOE was announced, regarding a significant step forward in improving air quality in Washington. Key to the agreement is TransAlta's willingness to voluntarily reduce mercury emissions by at least 50 percent by 2012 to address air-quality concerns in the region. Capture testing took place in 2009, and an activated injection product was selected. The process was expected to cost US$20–30 million over several years. Additionally, continuous emissions-monitoring systems (CEMS) for mercury measurement were certified by the Energy & Environmental Research Center (EERC). As part of the same agreement between TransAlta and the Washington Department of Ecology, TransAlta agreed to reduce emissions of nitrogen oxide (NO_{x}) by 20 percent beginning in 2009. In 2012, Selective Non Catalytic Reduction (SNCR) system was installed to further reduce NO_{x} at a cost of almost $20M.

Annually, the Centralia Power Plant emitted 350 pounds of mercury pollution, making it the state's largest single source of mercury pollution. Mercury pollution is a bio-cumulative neurotoxin which causes brain damage in humans and is especially dangerous for children and pregnant or nursing mothers. The National Park Service (NPS) in 2014 reported on high mercury levels in Olympic National Park, particularly at Hoh Lake. Although mercury pollution was also known to travel into the state from as far away as China, the NPS placed blame for the high recordings, as well as haze in the park, on the Big Hanaford facility.

Between 2001 and 2009, the facility produced an estimated 9,850,000 metric tons (9,850,000 t) of carbon dioxide per year. Among the top five polluting plants in the state, the Centralia site was recorded in 2013 to generate 13% of carbon emissions in the state and 81% of all combined emissions, amounting to 5,360,000 metric tons (5,360,000 t) annually. By 2019, the plant was recorded to emit 979,557 t CO_{2} emissions.

In December 2025, at the planned closure of the coal plant's operations, the WSDOE listed excess levels of arsenic, iron, and mercury measured in the air, soil, and groundwater at the site. A build-up of potential toxic chemicals from smoke, as well as long-term use of diesel fuel usage at the plant, were also noted. TransAlta was required to begin an environmental assessment and cleanup at the plant and surrounding area in early 2026.

== Ownership ==
A split-ownership contract was signed on October 30, 1970 and lasted until 2000. The plant was owned by eight utilities: PacifiCorp (47.5%), Washington Water Power (Avista Energy) (15%), Seattle City Light (8%), Snohomish County PUD (8%), Tacoma Power (8%), Puget Sound Energy (7%), Grays Harbor County PUD (4%), and Portland General Electric (2.5%).

PacifiCorp began to struggle financially, posting losses of $92 million in the third quarter of 1998 despite an attempt to purchase a holding company of British Energy early that year. In December 1998, ScottishPower announced their purchase of PacifiCorp for $7.9 billion in stock; the merger pended the approval of various state and federal commissions.

The plant instead was sold to TransAlta Corporation for $554 million, which was approved by the company boards of both Avista Energy and PacifiCorp in May 1999. The Grays Harbor and Snohomish utilities approved the purchase later that same month, with Seattle City Light and Tacoma Power following into June. In early 2000, Portland General Electric sold its 2.5% share to Avista Energy. The merger was officially approved by federal regulators in January 2000 and accepted by the Washington Utilities and Transportation Commission on March 6, 2000; Tacoma Power's share was officially sold in May. Utility regulators and state commissions in other states, including California, Oregon, and Wyoming, followed suit in approving the sale, allowing TransAlta to take full control of the plant.

Proceeds and profits from the sale were required by law to be given to customers and shareholders; the amount rebated back to customers was estimated to be a combined $13.3 million, while the three private owners, Avista, PacifiCorp, and Puget Sound Energy, were to receive a combined $47.4 million. Rate increases had been pending prior to the sale by both Avista, at 10.4%, and PacifiCorp, at 14.3%, and rebates from the sale of the Centralia Electric-Steam Plant to their customers were to be factored into the requests.

== Proposed projects ==
Proposals for the site include the operating of several green-energy facilities, including generating power via hydrogen and nuclear fusion, and the decommissioning of the Centralia Coal Mine is expected to incorporate renewable-energy machinery as the coal plant closes. The company created a $20 million fund for training and educational work programs for remaining employees of the plant.

A 1,000-acre (400 ha) solar farm, to be located immediately north of the Lewis and Thurston county border, was proposed in 2018. At the time of the announcement, it was to be the largest such type in the United States. Capable of providing up to 180 MW, nearly 200 megawatts short of the steam plant's production, it was to open in 2020.

== See also ==
- Coal power in the United States
