= Bucoda, Washington =

Town in Thurston County, Washington

- Town
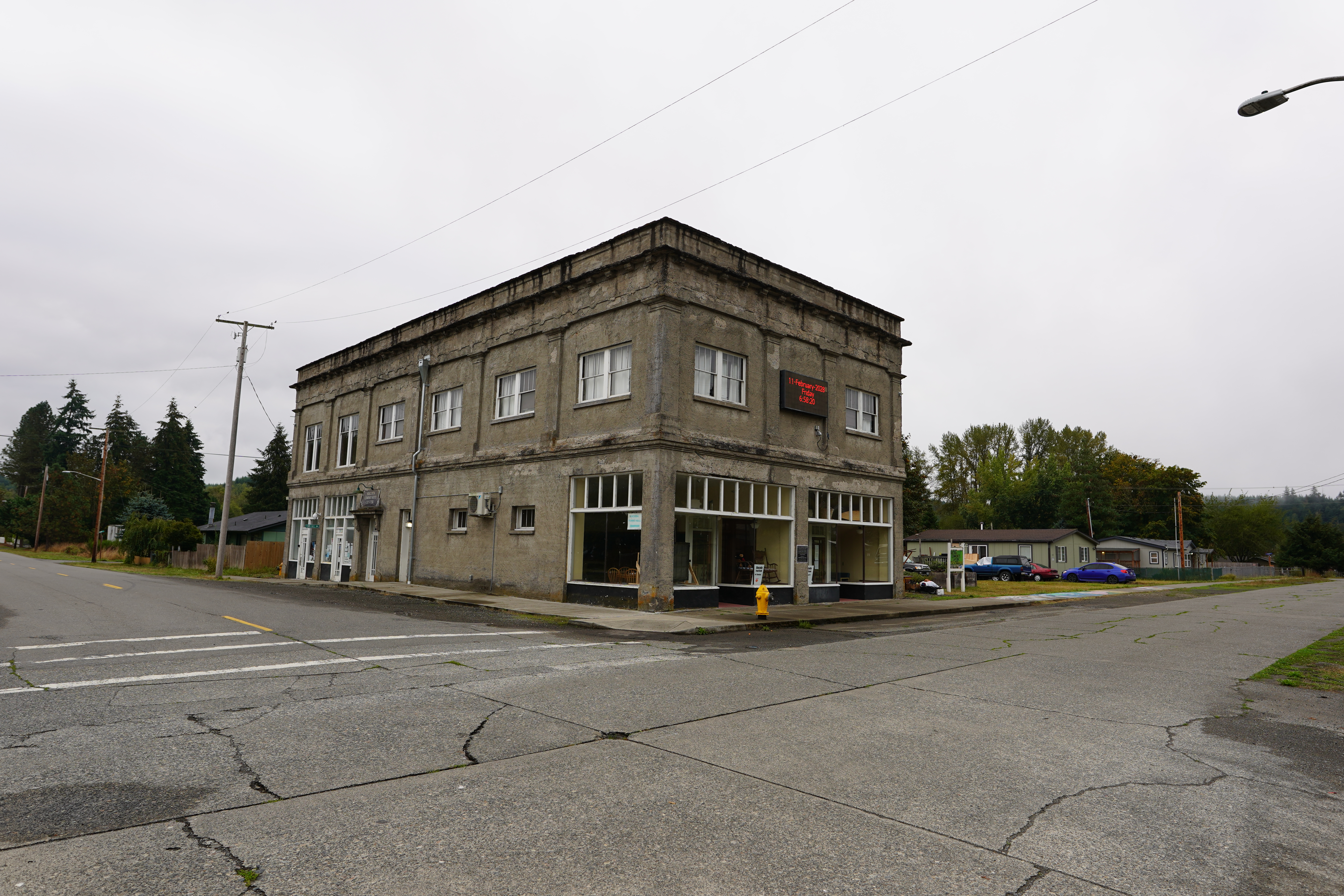
- Town hall
- Nickname(s): World's Tiniest Town with the Biggest Halloween Spirit, The Little Town with the Million Dollar Payroll
- Interactive map of Bucoda, Washington
- Coordinates: 46°47′49″N 122°52′18″W
- Country: United States
- State: Washington
- County: Thurston

Area
  - Total: 0.60 sq mi (1.56 km^{2})
  - Land: 0.58 sq mi (1.51 km^{2})
  - Water: 0.019 sq mi (0.05 km^{2})
- Elevation: 246 ft (75 m)

Population (2020)
  - Total: 600
  - Estimate (2024): 615
  - Density: 1,016/sq mi (392.4/km^{2})
- Time zone: UTC-8 (PST)
  - Summer (DST): UTC-7 (PDT)
- ZIP Code: 98530
- Area code: 360, 564
- FIPS code: 53-08605
- GNIS feature ID: 2411738
- Website: bucoda.us

Bucoda (/bjuːˈkoʊdə/) is a town in Thurston County, Washington, United States. The population was 600 at the 2020 census. The community refers to itself as the "World's Tiniest Town with the Biggest Halloween Spirit".

== Etymology ==
The land was first known as Seatco, an indigenous moniker to the area possibly meaning evil spirit, ghost, or devil; original native inhabitants were referred to as "Siatco". The town name became officially Seatco in 1887 when the community was platted by an early founder, Oliver Shead (Shed).

People in the town voiced a dislike of the name and the community was noted to have been renamed to Bucoda by Northern Pacific Railway in 1887; the name change was made official in either December 1899 or in 1890 by act of the state legislature. An accepted theory of the origination of the moniker of Bucoda comes from the taking of the first two letters of the last name of three prominent members of the early town, William Buckley (Buckner), a man recorded with the last name of Coulter, and J.E. (J.B.) Davis (David).

== History ==
=== 19th century ===
The first American settler at what is now Bucoda was Aaron Webster who arrived in 1854 or 1856. Webster purchased or obtained acres of land in the area, beginning a sawmill on the Skookumchuck River in 1857. In the 1860s, Webster and his wife, Sarah (Yantis), sold his land claim to Oliver and Celphraur Shead, homesteaders from Grand Mound; Oliver later purchased the Webster sawmill. Shead opened the Seatco post office in 1870; the office closed in 1873 but was re-established in 1883.

The Northern Pacific Railroad located a station at Seatco in 1872. On the Kalama-Tacoma line, several businesses were quickly established. In the 1880s, investors began operations to mine coal in the area, but the coal was of poor quality and operations were sporadic.

A major flood affecting communities in the Skookumchuck and Chehalis river watersheds occurred in December 1887; two Chehalis residents lost their lives while near the town.

Bucoda was recorded to have a population of 945 in the 1890 United States census and several manufacturing companies were established. Two major fires to the downtown core occurred in 1890 and 1898.

==== Seatco prison ====
In the late 1870s, Oliver Shead and sheriffs of Pierce and Thurston counties proposed Seatco to be a site of a Washington Territory prison. The institution was to be privately operated and constructed by prisoners; sheriffs at the time received additional wages if prisoners under their watch were engaged in labor. Accepted by the territorial legislature in 1877, the facility was Washington's first prison. The jail opened in mid-1878 and was a wooden, two-story structure with a basement, measuring 40 ft × 100 ft (12 m × 30 m). Cells were located on the first floor and female prisoners were kept separately from the general population; solitary confinement was located in the basement.

The jail garnered a reputation as a harsh institution as the inmates, some shackled for years, were used for dangerous and brutal manual labor in local industry. After the Washington State Penitentiary prison was built in Walla Walla, prisoners began to be transferred out of Seatco Prison in 1887. The jail was supposed to close in 1888 but was last used for inmates in 1890. Over 300 prisoners are recorded to have been incarcerated at Seatco prison.

The structure burned down in 1907; a dock was built on the site by a lumber company. The grounds burned again in the 1940s and remnants of the prison were rediscovered in 1974. The Seatco Prison Site was listed to the National Register of Historic Places in 1975.

=== 20th century ===
After two prior attempts were unsuccessful, Bucoda was officially incorporated on June 7, 1910. The first mayor was Emil Krupp. Boundary and signature concerns led to the failed efforts, but the issue of Thurston County becoming a dry county in 1909 is considered to be a reason for the early failures. Bucoda at the time had four saloon establishments and residents were more inclined to a "controlled approach to prohibition". Lumber production in the town, led by the Mutual Lumber Mill, was so productive that Bucoda was once billed as "The Little Town with the Million Dollar Payroll".

The Mutual Mill burned down in 1912 and was rebuilt in 1919; demand waned and production ceased in the 1930s, with a brief reopening into the 1940s. Another mill was begun and lasted into the mid-1950s when it was lost to another fire. The Mutual Mill water tower remained until the early 1980s.

=== 21st century ===
A federal bill signed in January 2025 authorized the renaming of the town's post office to the Mayor Rob Gordon Post Office. Gordon, who died of cancer the prior summer, had long been a resident and public servant in Bucoda, working in the fire department and on the town council. A dedication ceremony, and the unveiling of a plaque, was held in August 2025, attended by U.S. Rep. Marie Gluesenkamp Perez.

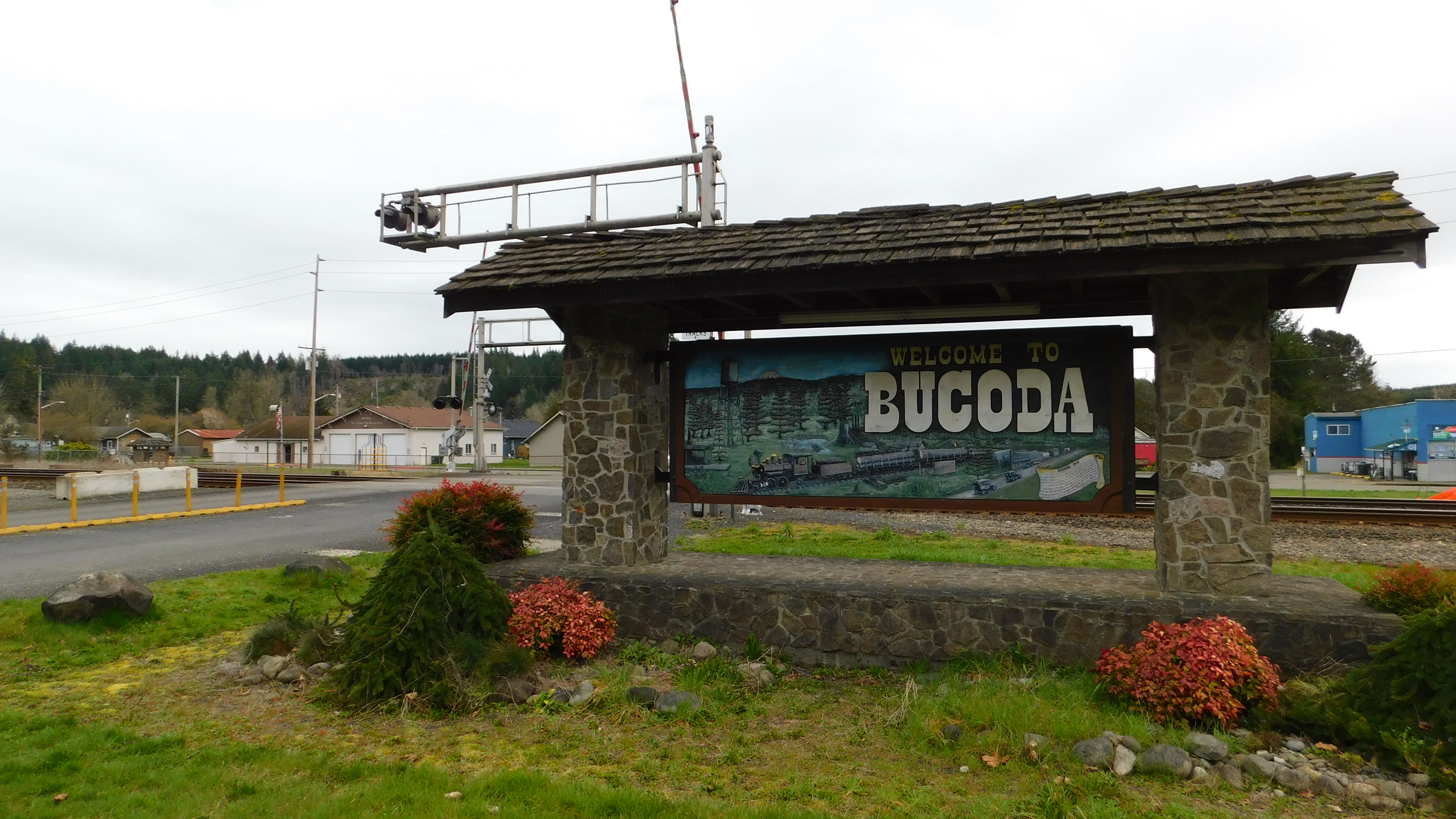
Town entrance, 2025

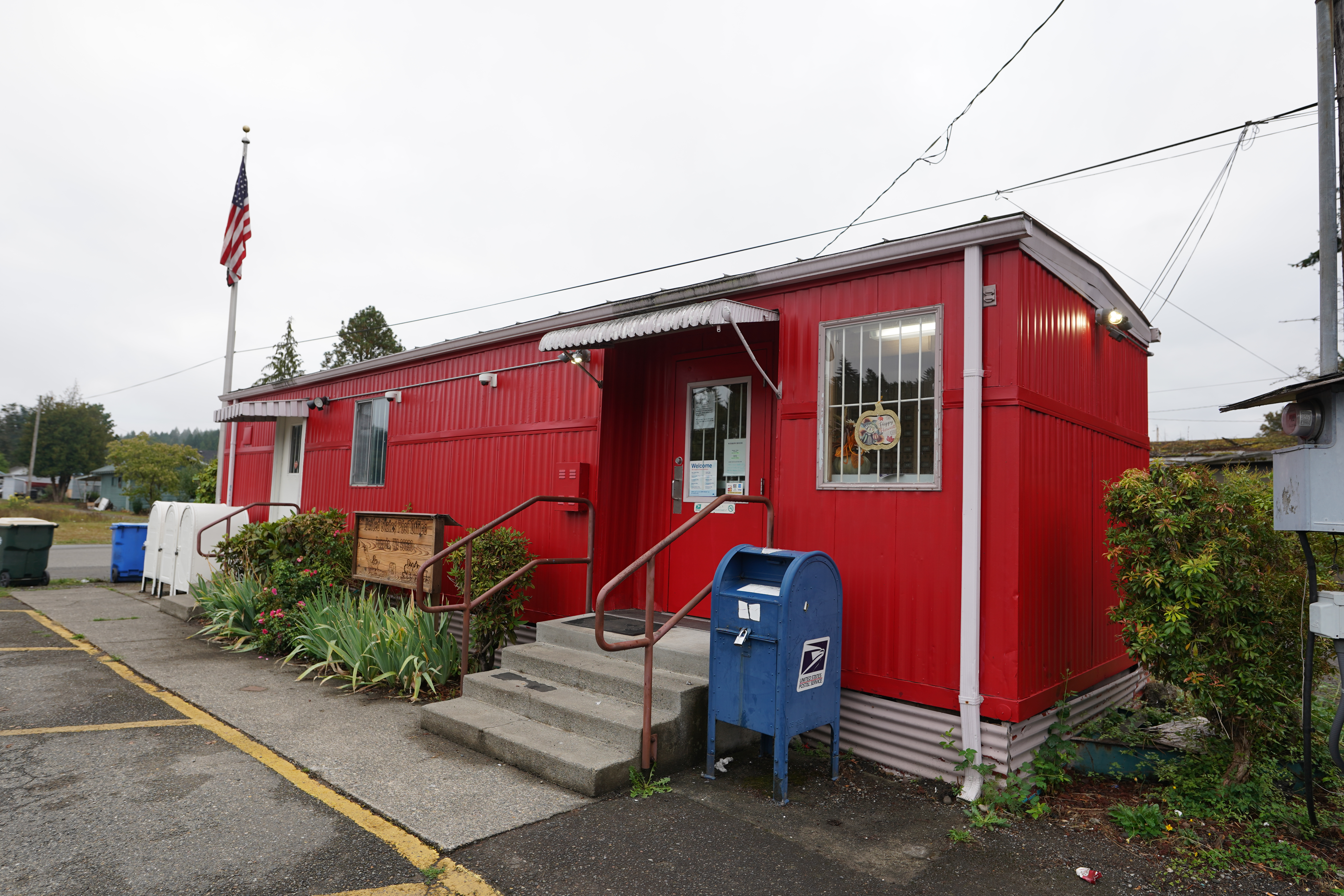
Mayor Rob Gordon Post Office, 2020

== Geography ==
According to the United States Census Bureau, the town has a total area of 0.59 square miles (1.53 km^{2}), of which, 0.57 square miles (1.48 km^{2}) is land and 0.02 square miles (0.05 km^{2}) is water.

== Demographics ==
Historical population
Census	Pop.	Note	%±
1890	945		—
1920	442		—
1930	703		59.0%
1940	541		−23.0%
1950	473		−12.6%
1960	390		−17.5%
1970	421		7.9%
1980	519		23.3%
1990	536		3.3%
2000	628		17.2%
2010	562		−10.5%
2020	600		6.8%
2024 (est.)	615	▲	2.5%
U.S. Decennial Census; 2020 Census

=== 2010 census ===
As of the 2010 census, there were 562 people, 222 households, and 148 families living in the town. The population density was 986.0 inhabitants per square mile (380.7/km^{2}). There were 243 housing units at an average density of 426.3 per square mile (164.6/km^{2}). The racial makeup of the town was 91.6% White, 1.2% African American, 0.9% Native American, 0.5% Asian, 0.2% Pacific Islander, 1.8% from other races, and 3.7% from two or more races. Hispanic or Latino of any race were 5.7% of the population.

There were 222 households, of which 30.2% had children under the age of 18 living with them, 41.9% were married couples living together, 18.5% had a female householder with no husband present, 6.3% had a male householder with no wife present, and 33.3% were non-families. 22.5% of all households were made up of individuals, and 7.2% had someone living alone who was 65 years of age or older. The average household size was 2.53 and the average family size was 2.92.

The median age in the town was 40.3 years. 20.1% of residents were under the age of 18; 9.5% were between the ages of 18 and 24; 26.3% were from 25 to 44; 31.1% were from 45 to 64; and 12.8% were 65 years of age or older. The gender makeup of the town was 51.1% male and 48.9% female.

=== 2000 census ===
As of the 2000 census, there were 628 people, 219 households, and 169 families living in the town. The population density was 1,419.7 people per square mile (551.1/km^{2}). There were 236 housing units at an average density of 533.5 per square mile (207.1/km^{2}). The racial makeup of the town was 92.04% White, 0.80% Native American, 2.23% Asian, 0.32% Pacific Islander, 1.27% from other races, and 3.34% from two or more races. Hispanic or Latino of any race were 2.07% of the population.

There were 219 households, out of which 37.0% had children under the age of 18 living with them, 56.6% were married couples living together, 15.1% had a female householder with no husband present, and 22.8% were non-families. 13.7% of all households were made up of individuals, and 4.1% had someone living alone who was 65 years of age or older. The average household size was 2.87 and the average family size was 3.18.

In the town, the age distribution of the population shows 29.8% under the age of 18, 8.8% from 18 to 24, 29.6% from 25 to 44, 23.4% from 45 to 64, and 8.4% who were 65 years of age or older. The median age was 34 years. For every 100 females, there were 109.3 males. For every 100 females age 18 and over, there were 117.2 males.

The median income for a household in the town was $34,286, and the median income for a family was $32,708. Males had a median income of $36,071 versus $22,321 for females. The per capita income for the town was $16,613. About 18.5% of families and 25.1% of the population were below the poverty line, including 41.2% of those under age 18 and 2.7% of those age 65 or over.

== Arts and culture ==
=== Festivals and events ===
Since 2009, the community has annually become known as "Boo-coda" every October, a moniker to represent its annual month-long Halloween festivities. The event is known for its Scary Nights Haunted House and hearse processions. The event has given Bucoda the nickname, "World's Tiniest Town with the Biggest Halloween Spirit".

=== Historical buildings and sites ===
Few buildings from Bucoda's early history survived due to several fires in the town. Remaining in Bucoda is "Joe's Place" saloon, an establishment that succeeded a saloon from the 1890s; the building was rebuilt after a blaze in the 1920s. The town is home to the Seatco Prison Site, listed on the National Register of Historic Places. The 1920s Odd Fellows Hall was restored in time for the town's centennial in 2010 and is home to the community's town hall.

=== Sports ===
Bucoda, from the 1880s into the 1960s, hosted a baseball team under sponsorship of the Mutual Mill company. The team competed in the Sawdust League and once played an exhibition game against the Hollywood Stars minor-league team in 1939.

== Parks and recreation ==
Bucoda's Volunteer Park was created in 1959. The South Sound Speedway, a Figure 8 racetrack, is northwest of the downtown area.

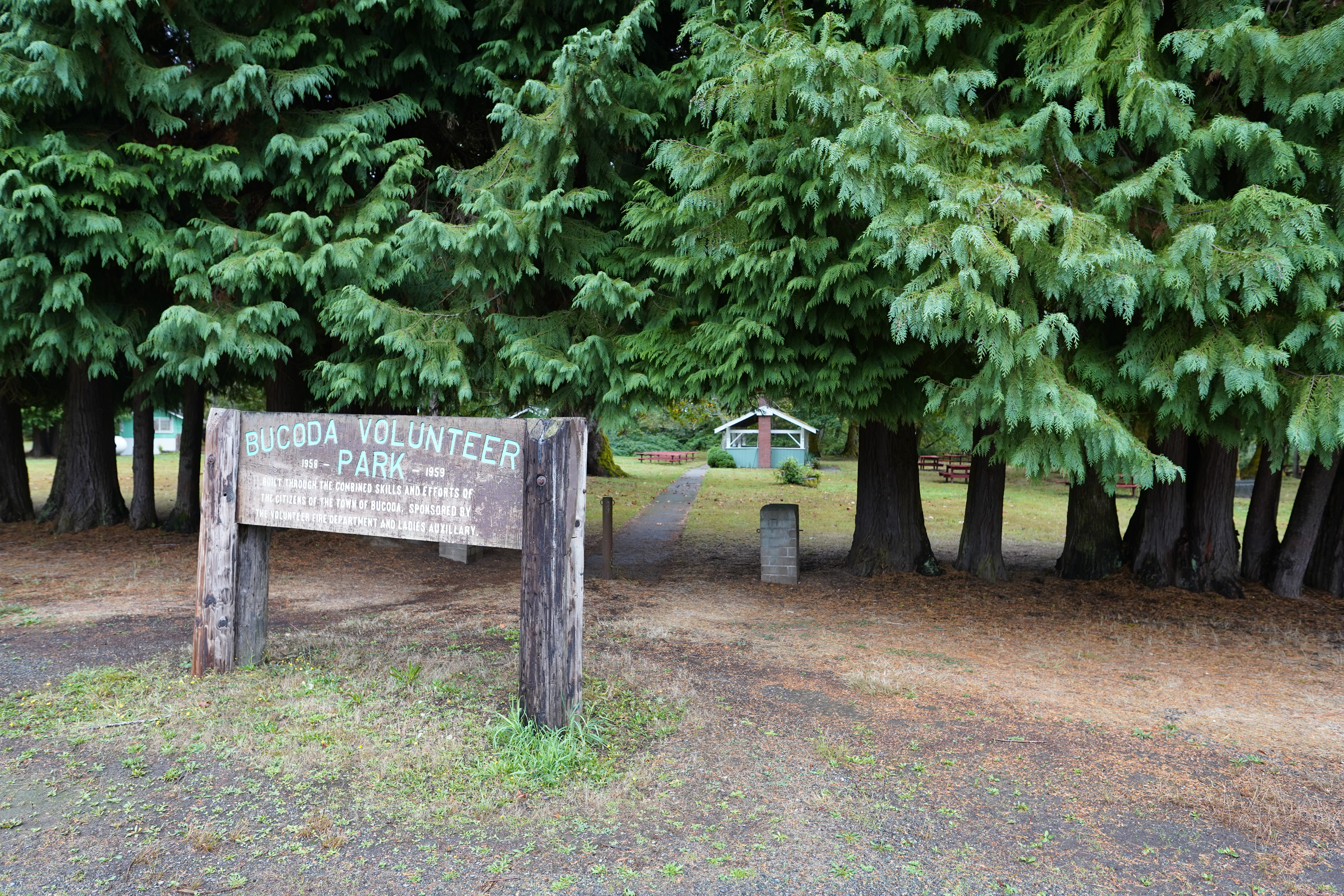
Bucoda Volunteer Park

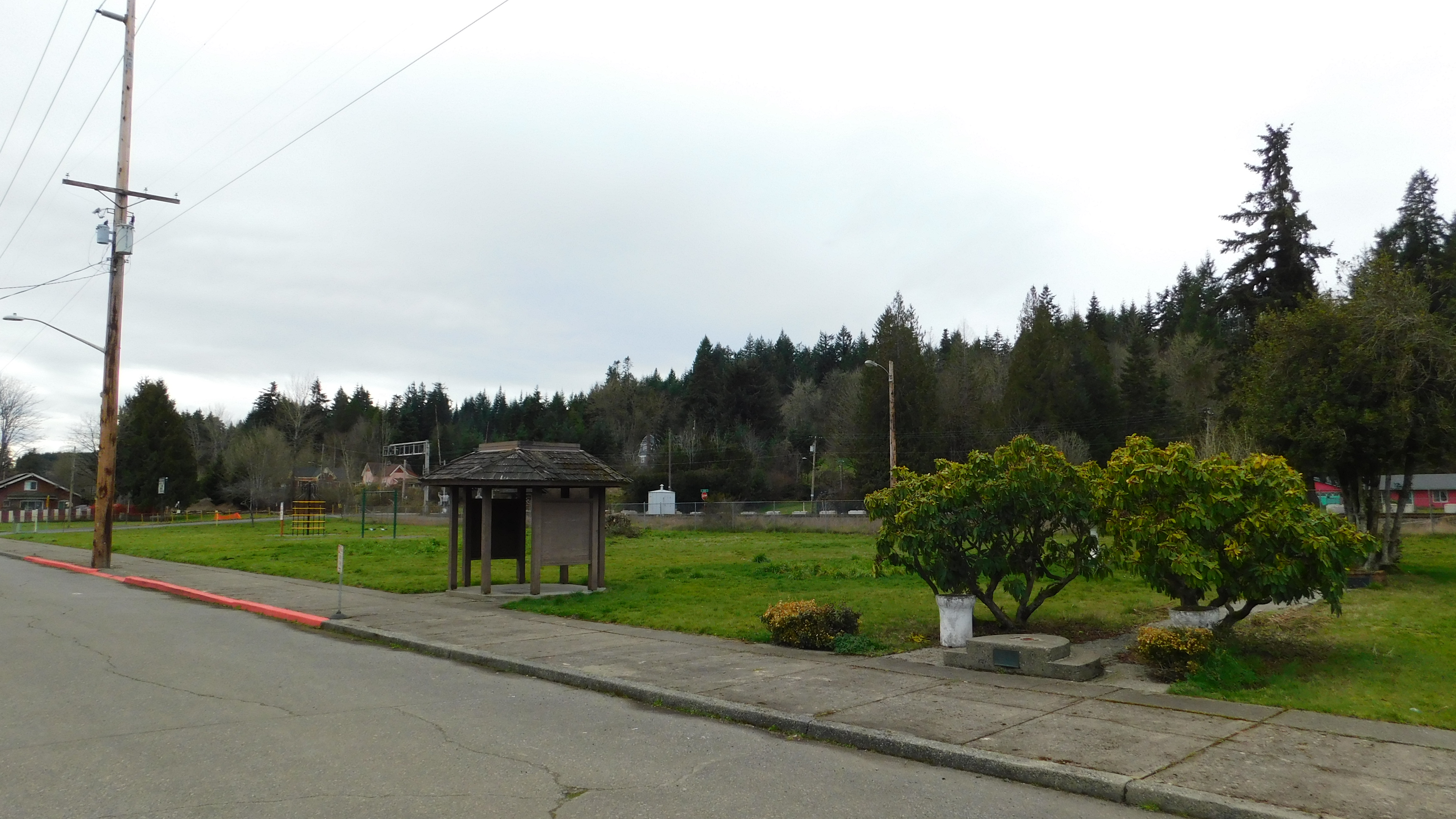
Bucoda Memorial Park, 2025

== Media ==
Bucoda is the setting of episode 97 "We All Ignore the Pit" of the horror podcast The Magnus Archives. A small scene for the independent movie, The Mountain, with Jeff Goldblum, was filmed at a restaurant in the town.

== Infrastructure ==
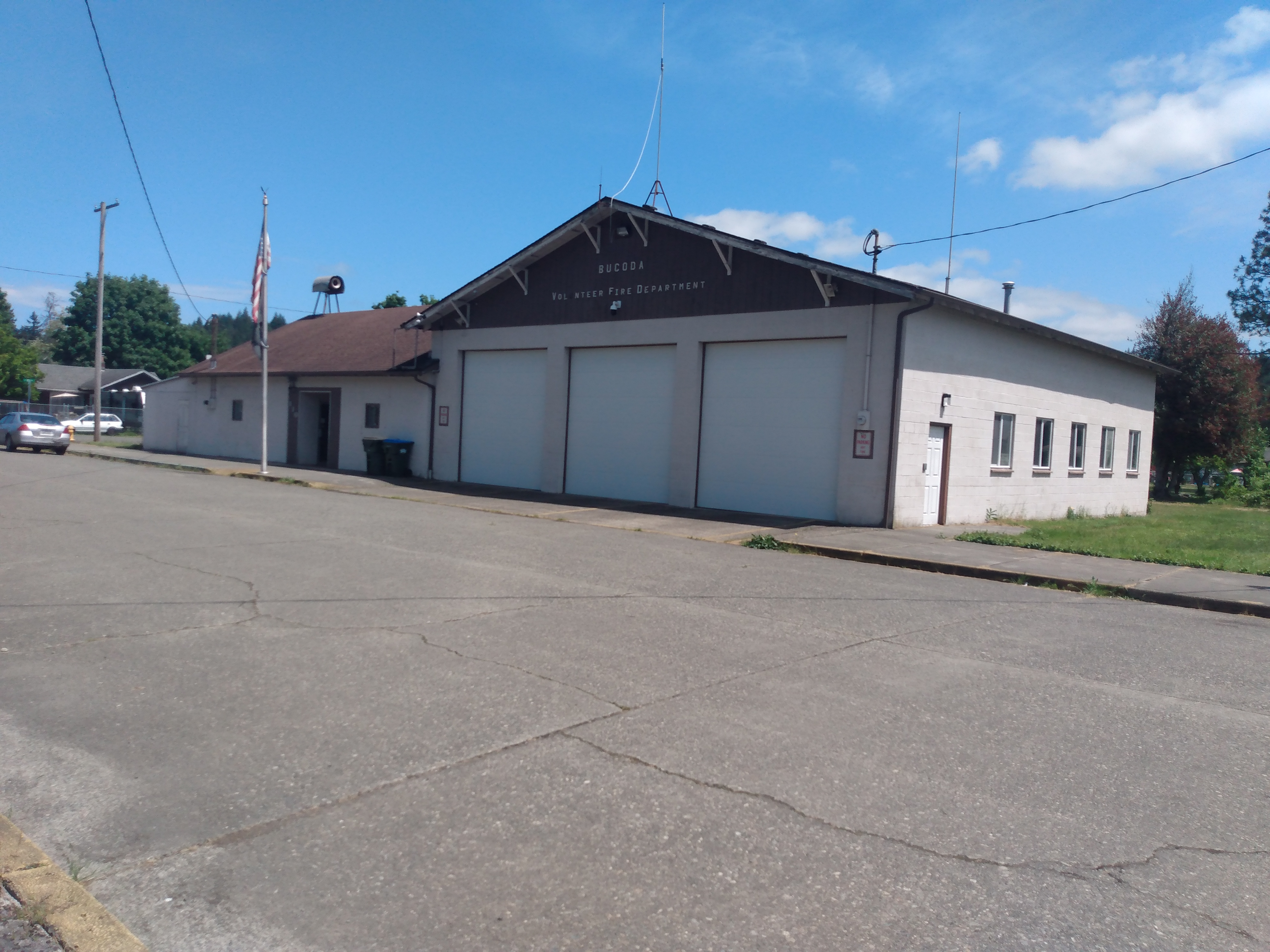
Bucoda Fire Station

Bucoda is served by ruralTRANSIT, a free bus service provided by the Thurston Regional Planning Council. The transportation system into South Thurston County has been in place since the mid-2000s and provides access to other transit operations, including Intercity Transit and Lewis County Transit.

== See also ==
- List of cities and towns in Washington
