= 6th Avenue (Tacoma) =

Street in Tacoma, Washington

- Owner: City of Tacoma Department of Public Works
- Length: 5.7 mi (9.2 km)
- Location: Tacoma, Washington, U.S.
- West end: South Wilton Road
- Major junctions: SR 16 / SR 163; Union Avenue; Division Avenue
- East end: Broadway

6th Avenue is a major east–west street in Tacoma, Washington, United States. It runs for 5.7 miles (9.2 km) across the city, connecting Tacoma Community College to the North End and downtown. 6th Avenue defines the directional north/south prefixes for streets.

State Route 16 and its predecessors followed 6th Avenue between the Tacoma Narrows Bridge and downtown until the construction of a freeway in the 1980s. The historic business district of 6th Avenue from approximately State to Alder remains one of the most active business districts in the city. An elected chamber of commerce called the 6th Ave Business District manages activities in the neighborhood.

== Street description ==
Going from west to east, 6th Avenue begins as a continuation of South Wilton Road on the south side of the Tacoma Narrows near Titlow Park and Day Island. The street crosses over a double-tracked railroad and briefly turns north around the park while climbing a hill. After another brief curve at Jackson Avenue, 6th Avenue turns due east and runs through a commercial area north of Tacoma Community College and south of State Route 16 (SR 16). The street reaches an interchange with SR 16 at Pearl Street (part of SR 163), which travels north to Point Defiance. 6th Avenue continues east across northern Tacoma, passing the University of Puget Sound campus and a linear business district named for the street. At Sprague Avenue, it turns northeasterly and splits away from Division Avenue, passing south of the city's hospitals and Wright Park. 6th Avenue then enters downtown Tacoma and terminates at Broadway, which overlooks Commencement Bay.
