= Washington State Route 16 =

State highway in the U.S. state of Washington

State Route 16
- SR 16 highlighted in red

Route information
- Maintained by WSDOT
- Length: 27.16 mi (43.71 km)
- Existed: 1964–present

Major junctions
- East end: I-5 in Tacoma
- SR 302 in Purdy; SR 160 in Port Orchard
- West end: SR 3 in Gorst

Location
- Country: United States
- State: Washington
- Counties: Pierce, Kitsap

Highway system
- State highways in Washington; Interstate; US; State; Scenic; Pre-1964; 1964 renumbering; Former
← SR 14	→ SR 17

State Route 16 (SR 16) is a 27.16-mile-long (43.71 km) state highway in the U.S. state of Washington, connecting Pierce and Kitsap counties. The highway, signed as east–west, begins at an interchange with Interstate 5 (I-5) in Tacoma and travels through the city as a freeway towards the Tacoma Narrows. SR 16 crosses the narrows onto the Kitsap Peninsula on the partially tolled Tacoma Narrows Bridge and continues through Gig Harbor and Port Orchard before the freeway ends in Gorst. The designation ends at an intersection with SR 3 southwest of the beginning of its freeway through Bremerton and Poulsbo. SR 16 is designated as a Strategic Highway Network (STRAHNET) corridor within the National Highway System as the main thoroughfare connecting Tacoma to Naval Base Kitsap and a part of the Highways of Statewide Significance program.

SR 16 was created during the 1964 state highway renumbering as the successor to Primary State Highway 14 (PSH 14). PSH 14, which had itself been the successor to State Road 14, traveled northeast from Shelton to Gorst and south to Gig Harbor. PSH 14 was extended over the Tacoma Narrows in 1939 on the unfinished Tacoma Narrows Bridge, which would later collapse months after opening in 1940, into Tacoma over Secondary State Highway 14C (SSH 14C). SR 16 has been expanded into a freeway in stages beginning with the original Nalley Valley Viaduct in Tacoma in 1971, and ending with the opening of an interchange near Port Orchard in 2009. Later improvements to the corridor include the installation of high-occupancy vehicle lanes that connect to I-5 and the rest of the freeway network in Pierce County, which were completed in 2019.

== Route description ==
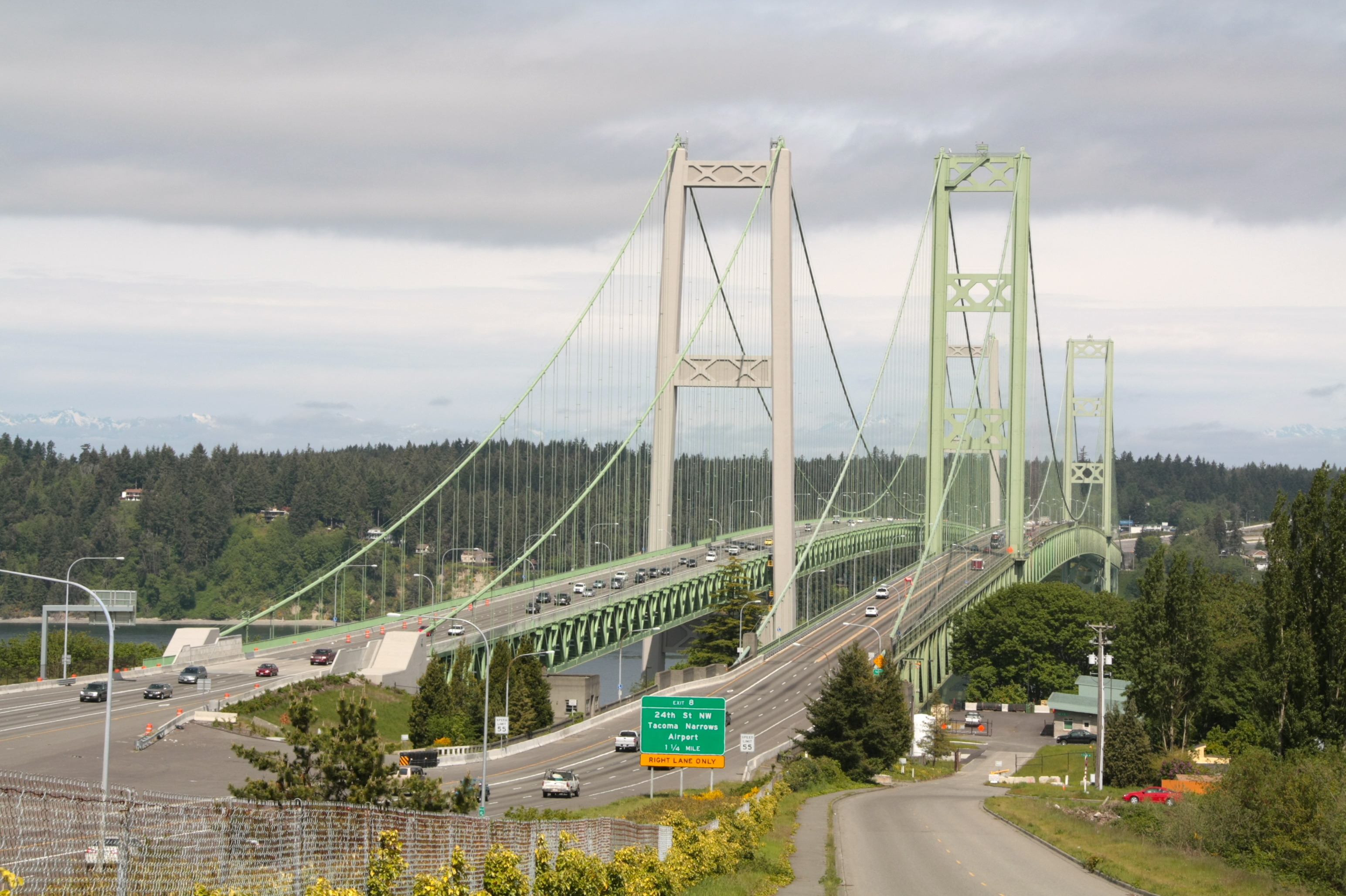
The twinned Tacoma Narrows Bridge carries SR 16 between Tacoma and the Kitsap Peninsula

SR 16 begins as an elevated freeway at an interchange with I-5 in Tacoma southwest of downtown. The interchange includes direct ramps for a set of high-occupancy vehicle lanes (HOV lanes) and collector–distributor lanes as it travels over South Tacoma Way and a railroad that carries Sound Transit's Sounder commuter train. SR 16 intersects Sprague Avenue at an interchange and turns west, passing a golf course and Cheney Stadium. A parallel pedestrian and cycling path, the Scott Pierson Trail, runs along the north side of the freeway. At a partial interchange with Center Street near Fircrest, SR 16 turns northwest and travels around the Tacoma Community College campus to an interchange with North Pearl Street (SR 163), which provides access to Ruston and the Vashon Island ferry.

SR 16 continues west past a partial cloverleaf interchange with Jackson Avenue and towards the Tacoma Narrows on the twin-suspension Tacoma Narrows Bridges. The 5,979-foot-long (1,822 m) westbound span and the tolled 5,400-foot-long (1,600 m) eastbound span combine to carry six lanes of SR 16 onto the Kitsap Peninsula. The eastbound span is tolled via electronic toll collection through the "Good to Go" program on the Kitsap Peninsula side of the bridge. Tolls for two axle vehicles and motorcycles are set at $4.50 for Good to Go accounts, $5.50 collected at the toll plaza, and $6.50 for Pay by Mail, with prices increasing for each additional axle by $2.25 for Good to Go accounts, $2.75 for toll plaza users, and $3.25 for Pay by Mail users.

SR 16 continues onto the Kitsap Peninsula and intersects 24th Street in a partial diamond interchange east of the Tacoma Narrows Airport as it passes the toll plaza for the eastbound Tacoma Narrows Bridge. The freeway travels northwest through Gig Harbor past interchanges with Olympic Drive and Wollochet Drive near Gig Harbor High School before it reaches Henderson Bay. SR 16 continues through an interchange with Burnham Drive and past the Washington Corrections Center for Women and St. Anthony Hospital towards Purdy, intersecting the southern terminus of SR 302. The freeway bypasses Purdy and Peninsula High School to the east before intersecting SR 302 Spur and entering Kitsap County. SR 16 passes the community of Burley and intersects its main access highway, Burley-Olalla Road, in an interchange before entering the city of Port Orchard. The freeway ends after serving as the western terminus of SR 160 and SR 166 on the west side of the city. The four-lane highway continues west along the Sinclair Inlet into Gorst, intersecting its spur route and ending at an intersection with SR 3.

Every year, the Washington State Department of Transportation (WSDOT) conducts a series of surveys on its highways in the state to measure traffic volume. This is expressed in terms of annual average daily traffic (AADT), which is a measure of traffic volume for any average day of the year. In 2012, WSDOT calculated that the busiest section of SR 16 was west of its interchange with Union Avenue in downtown Tacoma, serving 112,000 vehicles, while the least busiest section is after the SR 160 interchange west of Port Orchard, serving 32,000 vehicles. SR 16 is designated as a Strategic Highway Network corridor, connecting Naval Base Kitsap to the state highway system along with SR 3, within the National Highway System that classifies it as important to the national economy, defense, and mobility. WSDOT designates the entire route of SR 16 as a Highway of Statewide Significance, which includes highways that connect major communities in the state of Washington.

== History ==
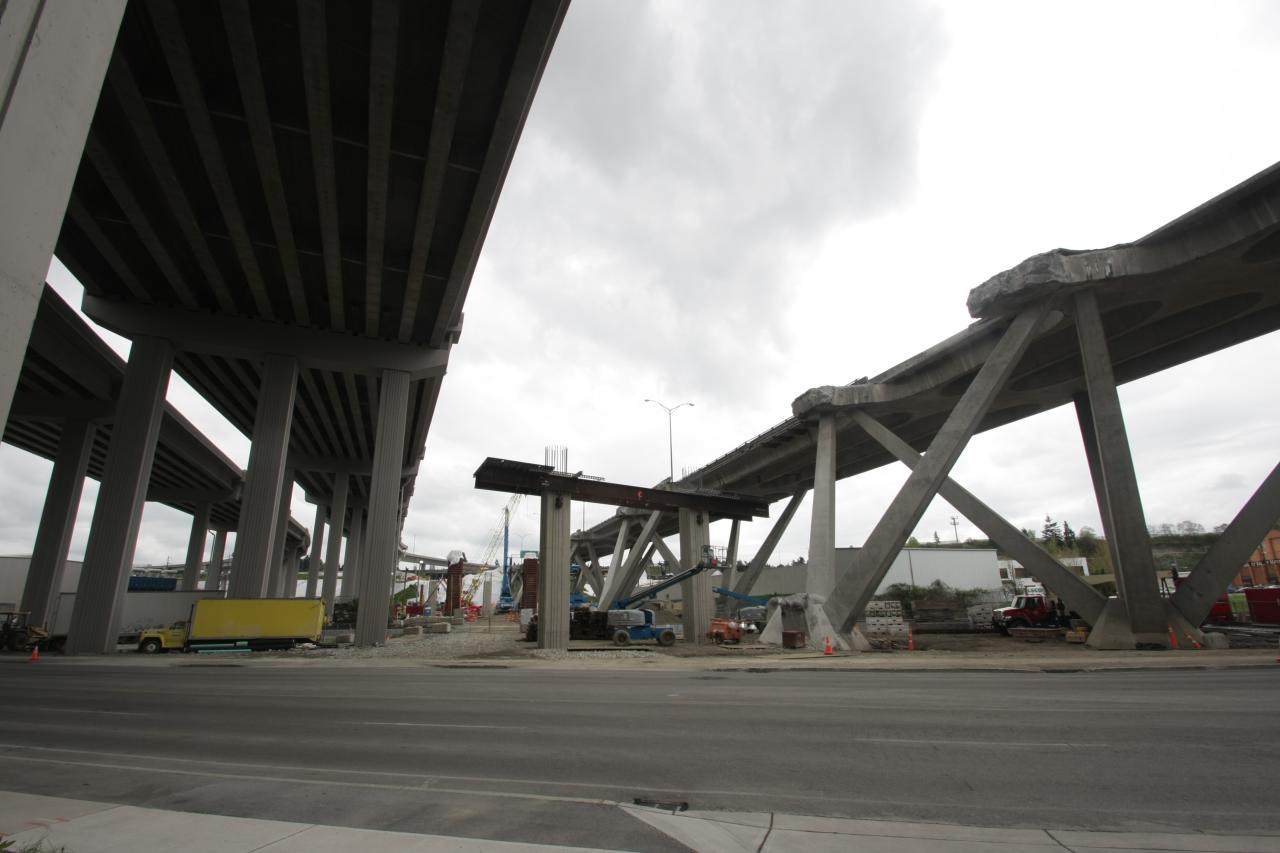
The current westbound (left) and now-demolished eastbound (right) portions of the Nalley Valley Viaduct, carrying SR 16 through Tacoma.

The present route of SR 16 roughly follows the route of several state highways signed during the 20th century, the first of which was State Road 14. State Road 14 traveled north from Shelton to Gorst and south into Gig Harbor as the primary connector between the Olympic and Kitsap peninsulas. Its construction had been proposed by Pierce County in the 1910s to connect Gig Harbor to the Navy Yard Highway, which was under construction at the time. State Road 14 was re-designated in 1937 as PSH 14 and included a secondary highway named SSH 14C that traveled from Gig Harbor to the Tacoma Narrows, site of an under-construction suspension bridge to open in 1940. PSH 14 was extended southeast over SSH 14C and the unfinished Tacoma Narrows Bridge into the city of Tacoma as part of a transfer of bridge ownership to the state of Washington in 1939. After the collapse of the original bridge on November 7, 1940, PSH 14 was truncated to Gig Harbor and traffic was redirected to a ferry landing in Manchester. The second Tacoma Narrows Bridge was opened on October 14, 1950, and PSH 14 was extended the following year to an intersection with U.S. Route 99 (US 99) in Downtown Tacoma.

PSH 14 was replaced by SR 16 under the sign route system created during the 1964 state highway renumbering, traveling from US 99 in Tacoma to SR 3 in Gorst. WSDOT began converting the SR 16 corridor to a controlled-access freeway with the construction of the Nalley Valley Viaduct in 1969, designed with tetrapod columns at a cost of $3.67 million. The viaduct opened on October 29, 1971, and connected SR 16 to I-5 in Tacoma, part of a new freeway replacing Bantz Boulevard between I-5 and the Tacoma Narrows Bridge. A bypass of Purdy on the Pierce–Kitsap county line was opened in November 1978 and the former route of SR 16 was divided between SR 302 and its spur route. The remainder of SR 16 in Port Orchard was upgraded to a freeway during the 1980s; however, at-grade intersections remained at Mullenix Road until 1993 and Burley-Olalla Road until 2009. Two at-grade intersection remain to access businesses and a cemetery from the westbound lanes north of the Wollochet Drive interchange.

WSDOT began installation of high-occupancy vehicle lanes (HOV lanes) on SR 16 as part of a Pierce County HOV system, which was constructed from 2000 to 2022 across several freeways. Beginning in the early 2000s, frontage roads and the Scott Pierson Trail were built along the freeway and sound walls were erected near residential areas in Tacoma. From Tacoma to Gig Harbor, WSDOT began installing exit numbers to interchanges with SR 16 that correspond to its milepost. The Nalley Valley Viaduct was replaced by a new westbound structure in 2011, carrying all four lanes of SR 16 towards I-5 in Tacoma, while the original viaduct was closed and demolished. The eastbound Nalley Valley Viaduct began construction in November 2011 and was completed by WSDOT in January 2014. The third viaduct, carrying HOV lanes, began construction in 2017 and was completed in November 2019.

On February 23, 2016, a ten-mile (16 km) section of SR 16 from the Kitsap–Pierce county line to Gorst was dedicated as the Tony Radulescu Memorial Highway, in honor of a Washington State Patrol trooper who was killed on that stretch of highway four years earlier.

The northern terminus of SR 16 in Gorst is a major traffic bottleneck and forms a gap between the two main freeways on the Kitsap Peninsula. A proposal to rebuild the intersection into a grade-separated interchange was considered in 2019 but did not move forward in a legislative session. A rebuilt interchange, estimated to cost around $500 million, has been sought to improve access to Bremerton National Airport and local military installations.

=== Tacoma Narrows Bridge ===
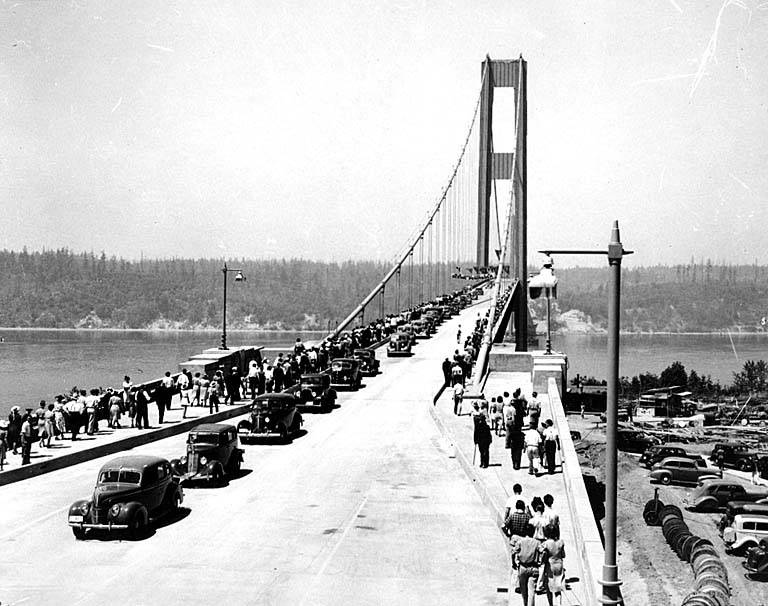
The original Tacoma Narrows Bridge, also known by its nickname of "Galloping Gertie", during its opening on July 1, 1940.

The Tacoma Narrows Bridge, which carries SR 16 across the Tacoma Narrows between Tacoma and the Kitsap Peninsula, was first proposed by locals during the late 19th century—the earliest being local rancher John G. Shindler while traveling through the Narrows by steamboat in 1888. The Northern Pacific Railway planned to build a trestle bridge over the Narrows to connect its western terminus in Tacoma to the proposed Puget Sound Naval Shipyard in Port Orchard. The Washington State Legislature, after extensive lobbying by local auto groups and businesses, authorized the construction of a road bridge over the Narrows in February 1929. The Washington Toll Bridge Authority was created in March 1937 to construct and maintain toll bridges throughout the state, beginning with the Tacoma Narrows Bridge from Tacoma to Gig Harbor and the Lake Washington Floating Bridge from Seattle to Mercer Island.

The bridge, designed by American suspension bridge engineer Leon Moisseiff, began construction on November 23, 1938, by the Pacific-General-Columbia Company, a partnership between three companies that received a $2.88 million grant from the Public Works Administration and a $3.52 million loan from the Reconstruction Finance Corporation, to be repaid through tolls. The Tacoma Narrows Bridge opened on July 1, 1940, and included ceremonies attended by an estimated 10,000 people, including Governor of Washington Clarence D. Martin. The 2,800-foot-long (850 m) bridge, christened the name "Galloping Gertie" by its construction workers, cost $6.4 million to build and became the third longest suspension span in the world after its completion. The following day, the art deco MV Kalakala was chosen to make the commemorative final ferry crossing of the Tacoma Narrows. The original toll for the bridge cost 55 cents per car, 15 cents per extra passenger, and 15 cents for pedestrians. The bridge, which was prone to movement during windstorms, collapsed at approximately 11:00 am on November 7, 1940, because of winds in excess of 42 miles per hour (68 km/h). The only fatality during the collapse was a dog trapped in a car belonging to local reporter Leonard Coatsworth of Tacoma.

A second, 5,979-foot-long (1,822 m) Tacoma Narrows Bridge was constructed between 1948 and 1951, officially opening to traffic on October 14, 1950. The bridge was designed to let wind pass through the structure with perforated girders and open grating in the deck. Traffic on the four-lane bridge began increasing from 6,000 vehicles in 1960 to nearly 67,000 vehicles by 1990, according to WSDOT AADT data. The increased traffic prompted the Washington State Legislature to approve the construction of a tolled eastbound bridge in 1999, to be finished during the early 2000s. The 5,400-foot-long (1,600 m) eastbound bridge was constructed between 2002 and 2007, opening on July 15, 2007, during ceremonies attended by 60,000 people, including Governor Christine Gregoire. The newer eastbound bridge provided the debut for the Good to Go RFID pass from WSDOT, which allows frequent users to bypass the toll booths by way of a prepaid transponder placed on the inside of the windshield and reducing the toll.

== Special routes ==
=== Spur route ===
State Route 16 Spur
- Location: Gorst, Washington
- Length: 0.39 mi (630 m)
- Existed: 1988–present

SR 16 has a 0.39-mile-long (0.63 km) spur route located in Gorst that travels west from SR 16 to southbound SR 3. The spur route was added to the state highway system in 1988 after SR 16 was re-aligned to avoid traffic signals in Gorst. WSDOT included the road in its annual AADT survey in 2012 and calculated that between 4,100 and 8,600 vehicles used the spur route.

=== Alternate route ===
State Route 16 AR
- Location: Tacoma Narrows Bridge
- Length: 0.68 mi (1,090 m)
- Existed: 2007–present

SR 16 AR is an unsigned 0.68-mile-long (1.09 km) alternate route serving traffic passing through the eastbound toll plaza (rather than using electronic toll collection) approaching the Tacoma Narrows Bridge in Pierce County. The route was added to the state highway system in 2007 after the completion of the eastbound Tacoma Narrows Bridge on July 15. WSDOT included the road in its annual AADT survey in 2012 and calculated that 9,100 vehicles used the alternate route.

== Exit list ==
County	Location	mi	km	Exit	Destinations	Notes
Pierce	Tacoma	0.00	0.00		I-5 to I-705 – Seattle, Portland, City Center	Southern terminus
Pierce	Tacoma	0.56	0.90	1A	Sprague Avenue	
Pierce	Tacoma	1.31	2.11	1B	Union Avenue	
Pierce	Tacoma	2.10	3.38	1C	Center Street – Fircrest	Westbound exit and eastbound entrance
Pierce	Tacoma	2.66	4.28	2A	South 19th Street west	Signed as eastbound exit 2B with access to Orchard Street
Pierce	Tacoma	2.66	4.28	2B	South 19th Street east, North Orchard Street	Signed as eastbound exit 2A with access to westbound South 19th Street only
Pierce	Tacoma	3.80	6.12	3	SR 163 north (Pearl Street) / 6th Avenue – Ruston	Southern terminus of SR 163
Pierce	Tacoma	4.82	7.76	4	Jackson Avenue, 6th Avenue – University Place	
Pierce	Tacoma Narrows	5.20– 6.33	8.37– 10.19	Tacoma Narrows Bridge		
Pierce		6.69	10.77	8	24th Street – Tacoma Narrows Airport	No eastbound exit
Pierce		6.74	10.85	8	Toll plaza (SR 16 AR)	Eastbound only
Pierce		7.57	12.18	9	36th Street – Tacoma Narrows Airport	Eastbound exit and entrance only
Pierce	Gig Harbor	8.66	13.94	10	Olympic Drive	
Pierce	Gig Harbor	9.93	15.98	11	Wollochet Drive Northwest – City Center	
Pierce	Gig Harbor	12.78	20.57	14	Burnham Drive	
Pierce	Gig Harbor	13.68	22.02	15	SR 302 west – Purdy, Key Center	Westbound exit and eastbound entrance only; eastern terminus of SR 302
Kitsap		15.96	25.69	17	SR 302 Spur south to SR 302 west – Purdy, Key Center, Shelton	Westbound entrance and eastbound exit only; northern terminus of SR 302 Spur
Kitsap		18.03	29.02	20	Burley-Olalla Road	
Kitsap		20.54	33.06		Mullenix Road	
Kitsap	Port Orchard	23.06	37.11		SR 160 east (Sedgwick Road) – Southworth Ferry	Western terminus of SR 160
Kitsap	Port Orchard	24.62	39.62	26	Old Clifton Road, Tremont Street	
Kitsap		26.13	42.05		SR 166 east – Port Orchard	Westbound entrance and eastbound exit; western terminus of SR 166
Kitsap				Western end of freeway		
Kitsap	Gorst	26.71	42.99	28	SR 16 Spur to SR 3 south – Belfair, Shelton	Eastern terminus of SR 16 Spur
Kitsap	Gorst	27.16	43.71		SR 3 north – Bremerton, Poulsbo	Northern terminus
1.000 mi = 1.609 km; 1.000 km = 0.621 mi: Incomplete access; Tolled
