= Gig Harbor, Washington =

Gig Harbor, Washington txʷaalqəɬ
- City
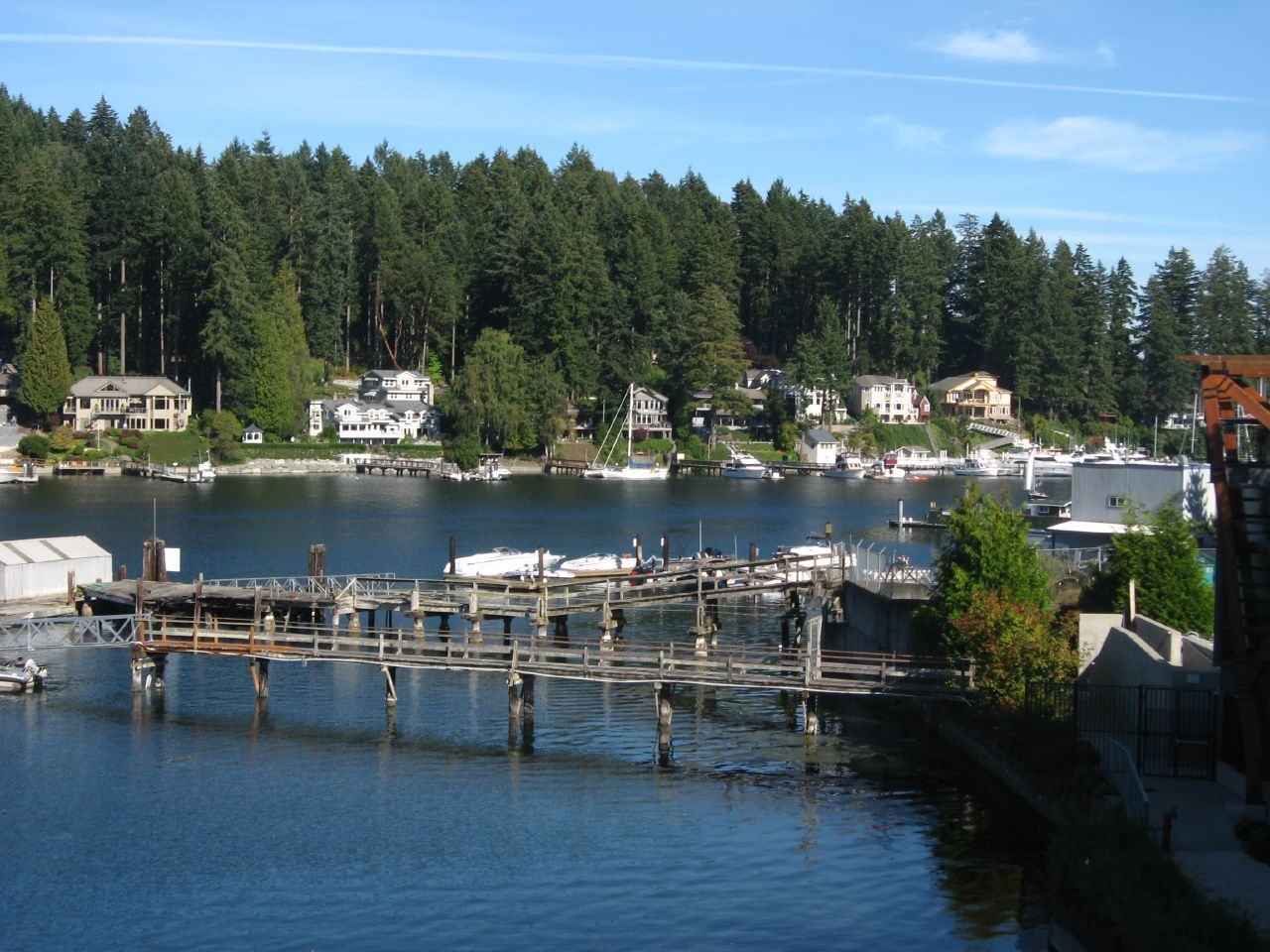
- Nicknames: The Maritime City, The Harbor
- Location of Gig Harbor, Washington
- Coordinates: 47°20′45″N 122°36′31″W
- Country: United States
- State: Washington
- County: Pierce

Government
  - Type: Strong Mayor
  - Mayor: Mary Barber

Area
  - Total: 6.12 sq mi (15.85 km^{2})
  - Land: 5.90 sq mi (15.29 km^{2})
  - Water: 0.22 sq mi (0.56 km^{2})
- Elevation: 108 ft (33 m)

Population (2020)
  - Total: 12,029
  - Density: 1,815.7/sq mi (701.05/km^{2})
- Time zone: UTC−8 (Pacific (PST))
  - Summer (DST): UTC−7 (PDT)
- ZIP Codes: 98329, 98332, 98335
- Area code: 253
- FIPS code: 53-26735
- GNIS feature ID: 2410588
- Website: cityofgigharbor.net

Gig Harbor (Lushootseed: txʷaalqəɬ) is the name of both a bay on Puget Sound and a city on its shore in Pierce County, Washington. The population was 12,029 at the 2020 census.

Gig Harbor bills itself as "the Maritime City" and maintains a strong connection to its maritime heritage. Due to its close access to several state and city parks, and historic waterfront that includes boutiques and fine dining, it has become a popular tourist destination. Gig Harbor is located along State Route 16, about 6 mi (9.7 km) from its origin at Interstate 5, over the Tacoma Narrows Bridge.

== History ==
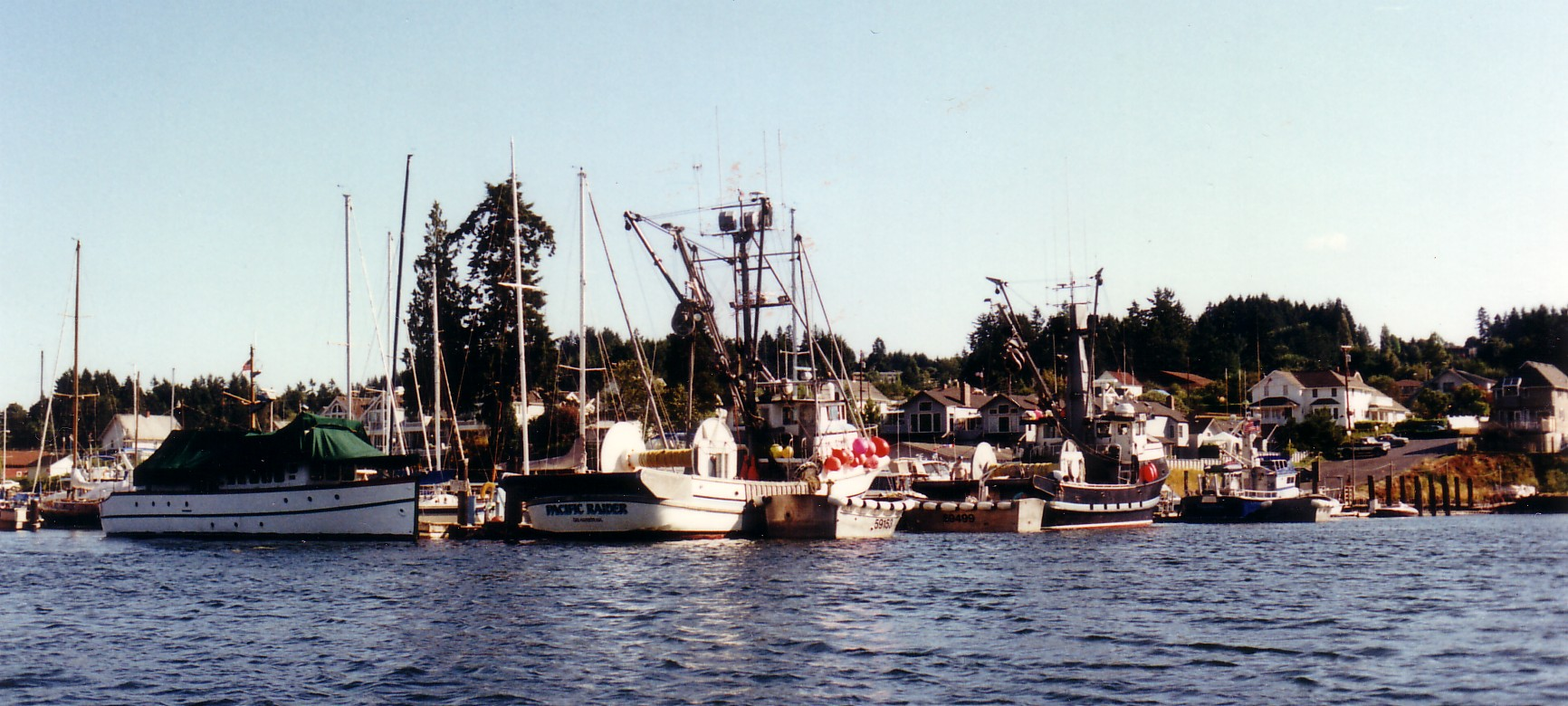
Boats in Gig Harbor

The Gig Harbor is the traditional homeland of S'Homamish or Homamish (Lushootseed: sxʷəbabš), an ancestral band of the modern-day Puyallup people. The area is known in their Lushootseed language as txʷaalqəɬ, meaning "place where game exists". There was a Puyallup settlement at the mouth of the harbor that included six houses, and a large longhouse. This village existed until the late 19th century, with the longhouse finally being torn down by settlers in 1915. The band was later relocated to the Puyallup Indian Reservation.

During a heavy storm in 1840, Captain Charles Wilkes brought the captain's gig (small boat) into the harbor for protection. Later, with the publication of Wilkes' 1841 map of the Oregon Territory, the sheltered bay was named in English as Gig Harbor by George Sinclair for his boat.

In 1867, fisherman Samuel Jerisich came to the Gig Harbor area, along with many other immigrants from Sweden, Norway, and Croatia. The town was platted in 1888 by Alfred M. Burnham, the owner of a local general store and native of Albert Lea, Minnesota, where he advertised opportunities in Gig Harbor.

Commercial fishing, boat building, and logging dominated the economy of the Gig Harbor area, which developed two business districts in the 1920s on opposite sides of the harbor. Transportation between Gig Harbor and Tacoma was primarily handled by the "Mosquito fleet", a network of mostly-passenger steamships that traversed various points on Puget Sound. Automobiles were required to drive 107 miles (172 km) through Olympia to reach Tacoma; the Washington Navigation Company later launched a Point Defiance–Gig Harbor ferry service in 1927 that could carry 80 vehicles. The first Tacoma Narrows Bridge was completed in July 1940 to replace the ferry crossing, but collapsed a few months later. The ferry service was restored until the modern-day westbound bridge was completed in 1950. A third bridge opened in 2007 to carry eastbound traffic on the expanded State Route 16 freeway.

Gig Harbor was officially incorporated as a town on July 12, 1946, after a previous attempt in September 1945 was rejected by 13 votes. The town had 803 residents in 1950, but soon grew due to the ease of access afforded by the replacement bridge that turned Gig Harbor into a bedroom community for Tacoma workers. Gig Harbor was re-incorporated as a city in 1981. By the 1980s and 1990s, substantial residential and retail development had pushed the city's boundaries west to State Route 16, which had been upgraded to a partial freeway. The downtown area shifted towards tourism to compensate for lost business and attract new development. The city's historic boat building industry declined, but its facilities remain preserved as historic landmarks. A fleet of commercial fishing boats is based in Gig Harbor and make annual trips to Alaska for the summer season to harvest salmon.

=== Skansie shipyard ===
In 1905, the Skansie brothers were the first in the area to build a gasoline-powered fishing boat. They did so at first by refitting boats with a gasoline-powered engine. Usually the motors were quite small, between 6 and 8 horsepower; the Skansie brothers originally used a 7-horsepower engine. Although these were powerboats, neither masts nor a turntable to hoist in the nets were used. This work was all done by hand. However, with the introduction of a motor, the boats were not able to go as far as Alaska. Skansie shipyards built fishing vessels from the late 1910s to the early 1950s.

== Geography ==
According to the U.S. Census Bureau, the city has a total area of 5.96 square miles (15.44 km^{2}), of which 5.95 square miles (15.41 km^{2}) are land and 0.01 square miles (0.03 km^{2}) is water. It is located on the Gig Harbor Peninsula, a sub-peninsula of the Kitsap Peninsula.

=== Climate ===
Gig Harbor

Climate chart (precipitation, max. and min. temperature)
J	F	M	A	M	J	J	A	S	O	N	D
5.4 47 35	4.4 50 36	4.2 55 39	2.9 60 42	2 66 47	1.6 71 52	0.9 76 55	0.8 77 55	1.4 71 51	3.4 61 45	6.1 52 40	5.9 47 35
- █ Average max. and min. temperatures in °F
- █ Precipitation totals in inches
Metric conversion
J	F	M	A	M	J	J	A	S	O	N	D
137 8 2	113 10 2	106 13 4	73 16 6	51 19 8	40 22 11	22 24 13	21 25 13	36 22 11	86 16 7	155 11 4	150 8 2
- █ Average max. and min. temperatures in °C
- █ Precipitation totals in mm

Gig Harbor has a marine west coast climate: Warm and dry summers, transitional springs and autumns, and cool and wet winters, with occasional snow. The annual high and low temperatures of Gig Harbor are 59.3 and 44.8 °F (15.2 and 7.1 °C), respectively, making for an average of 52.05 °F (11.14 °C).

== Demographics ==
Historical population
Census	Pop.	Note	%±
1890	321		—
1950	803		—
1960	1,094		36.2%
1970	1,657		51.5%
1980	2,429		46.6%
1990	3,236		33.2%
2000	6,465		99.8%
2010	7,126		10.2%
2020	12,029		68.8%
U.S. Decennial Census; 2020 Census

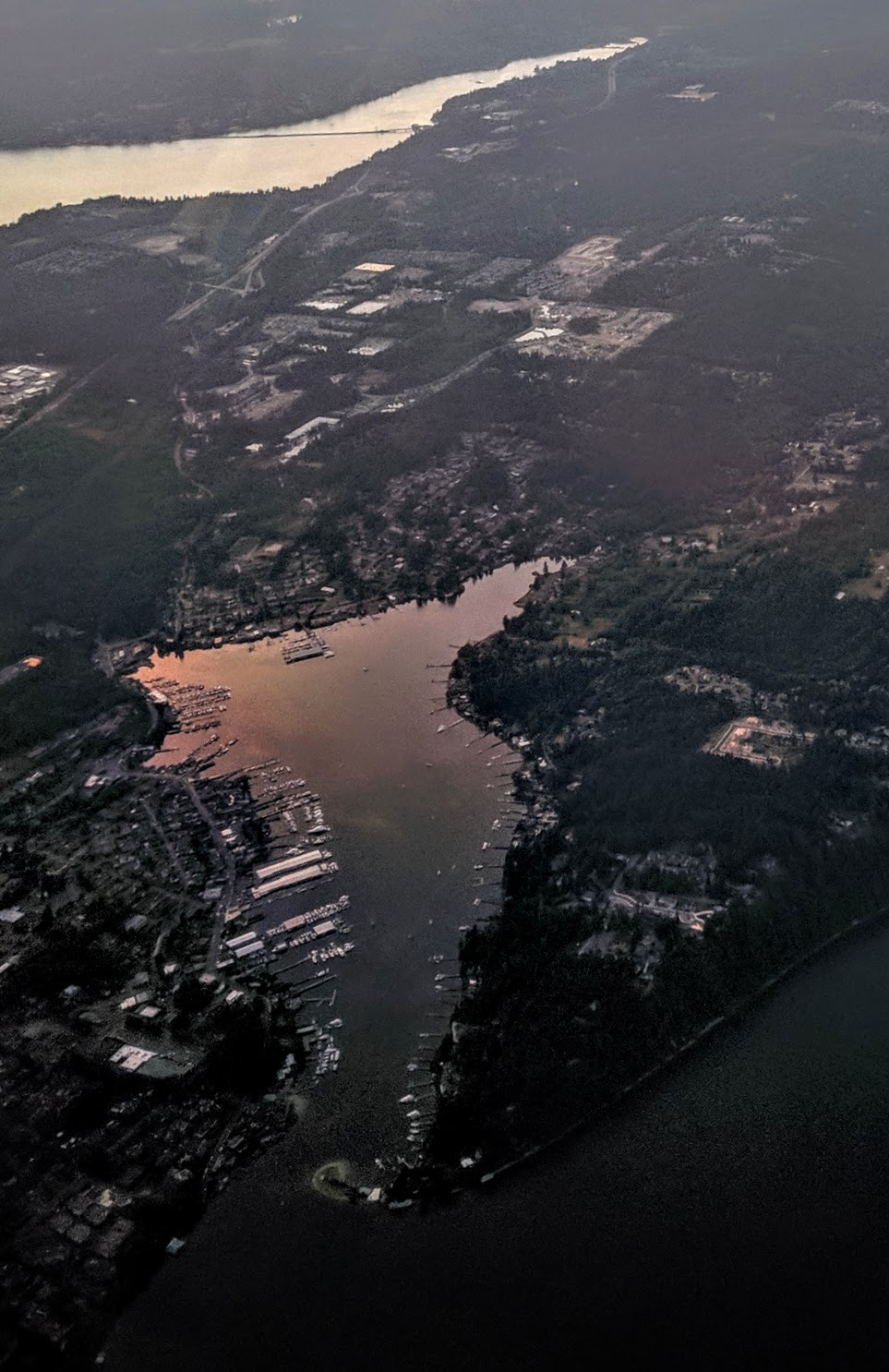
Aerial view, looking northwest, of the harbor and town of Gig Harbor, with Henderson Bay in background

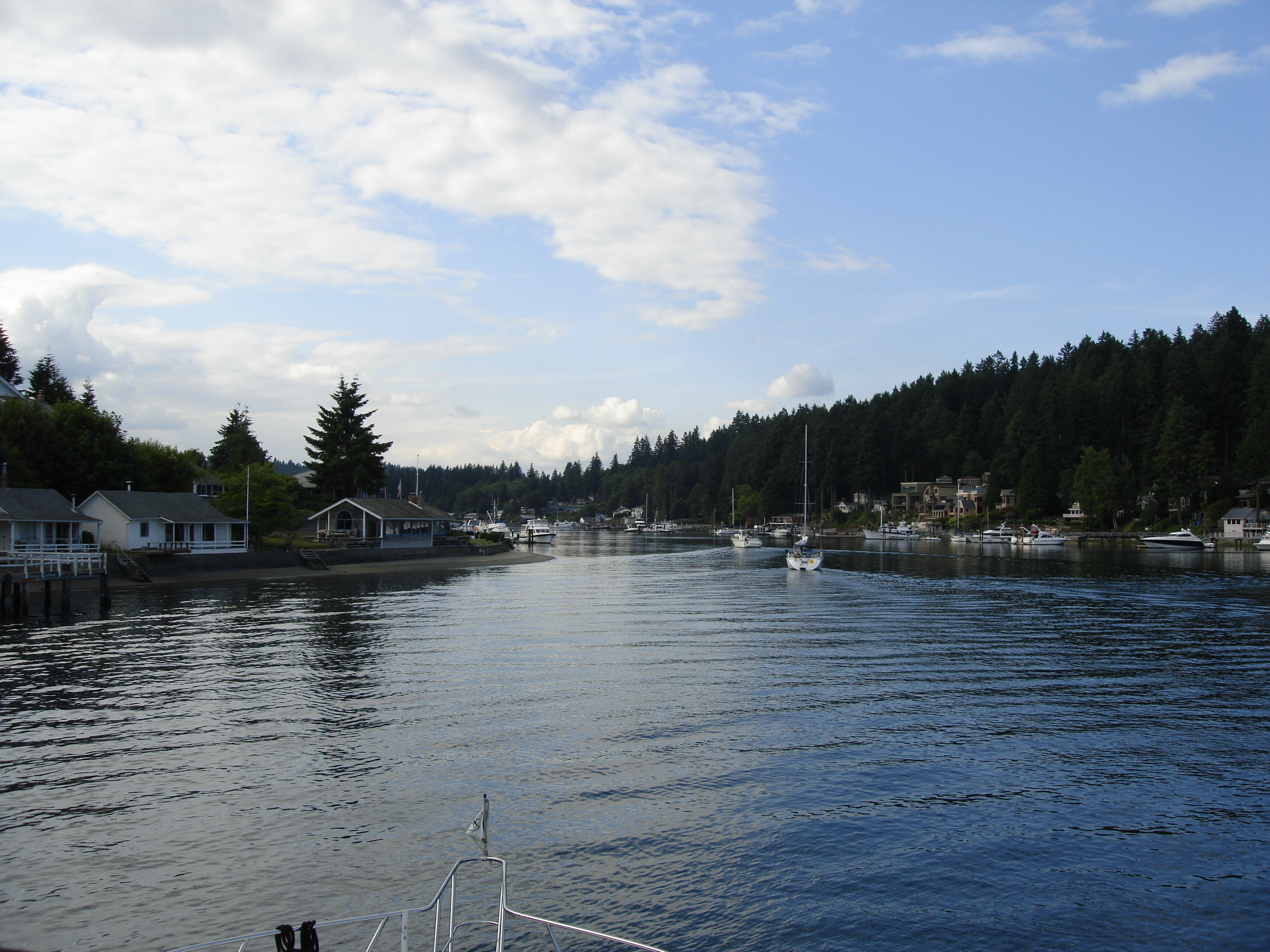
Entering Gig Harbor

=== 2020 census ===
As of the 2020 census, Gig Harbor had a population of 12,029. The median age was 48.2 years. 19.8% of residents were under the age of 18 and 30.0% of residents were 65 years of age or older. For every 100 females there were 86.0 males, and for every 100 females age 18 and over there were 83.3 males age 18 and over.

100.0% of residents lived in urban areas, while 0.0% lived in rural areas.

There were 5,171 households in Gig Harbor, of which 25.9% had children under the age of 18 living in them. Of all households, 51.9% were married-couple households, 13.9% were households with a male householder and no spouse or partner present, and 29.1% were households with a female householder and no spouse or partner present. About 30.5% of all households were made up of individuals and 18.1% had someone living alone who was 65 years of age or older.

There were 5,642 housing units, of which 8.3% were vacant. The homeowner vacancy rate was 1.0% and the rental vacancy rate was 9.8%.

Racial composition as of the 2020 census
Race	Number	Percent
White	9,845	81.8%
Black or African American	171	1.4%
American Indian and Alaska Native	46	0.4%
Asian	596	5.0%
Native Hawaiian and Other Pacific Islander	42	0.3%
Some other race	221	1.8%
Two or more races	1,108	9.2%
Hispanic or Latino (of any race)	896	7.4%

=== 2010 census ===
As of the 2010 census, 7,126 people, 3,291 households, and 1,937 families resided in the city. The population density was 1,197.6 inhabitants per square mile (462.4/km^{2}). The 3,560 housing units averaged 598.3 units per square mile (231.0 units/km^{2}). The racial makeup of the city was 90.2% White, 1.2% African American, 0.6% Native American, 2.4% Asian, 0.5% Pacific Islander, 1.4% from other races, and 3.6% from two or more races. Hispanics or Latinos of any race were 5.8% of the population.

Of the 3,291 households, 22.2% had children under the age of 18 living with them, 46.7% were married couples living together, 9.0% had a female householder with no husband present, 3.1% had a male householder with no wife present, and 41.1% were not families. About 34.2% of all households were made up of individuals, and 17.1% had someone living alone who was 65 years of age or older. The average household size was 2.12 and the average family size was 2.69.

The median age in the city was 48.1 years; 18% of residents were under the age of 18; 7% were 18 to 24; 21% were 25 to 44; 29% were 45 to 64; and 25% were 65 years of age or older. The gender makeup of the city was 46% male and 54% female.

== Parks and recreation ==
The 8.5-acre (3.4 ha) Tubby's Trail Dog Park in Gig Harbor near the Tacoma Narrows Bridge was opened in October 2014. The site is named in memory of a three-legged Black Cocker Spaniel who died during the bridge collapse of "Galloping Gertie" in 1940.

== Government ==
At the state level, Gig Harbor is part of the 26th legislative district, which encompasses all of peninsular Pierce County and southeastern Kitsap County, including Bremerton and Port Orchard. It is represented in the Washington State Legislature by senator Deborah Krishnadasan and representatives Adison Richards and Michelle Caldier. At the federal level, Gig Harbor is part of the 6th congressional district and is represented by representative Emily Randall.

== Education ==
The Peninsula School District is the district covering the city of Gig Harbor and the peninsula. It has three high schools: Gig Harbor High School, Peninsula High School, and Henderson Bay Alternative High School. Tacoma Community College opened a satellite campus in Gig Harbor in 1992, and operates a branch serving Washington Corrections Center for Women, also in Gig Harbor.

== Media ==
The Peninsula Gateway is a weekly newspaper published in Gig Harbor since 1917. It has been owned by McClatchy, publisher of the News Tribune and co-owner of The Seattle Times, since 1995.

== Infrastructure ==
=== Transportation ===
The Tacoma Narrows Bridge, which carries State Route 16, looking towards Gig Harbor

Gig Harbor is located along State Route 16, a regional freeway that connects the Key Peninsula to Kitsap County and Tacoma. The freeway crosses the Tacoma Narrows Bridge, a set of twin suspension bridges that opened in 1950 and 2007. The city is served by Pierce Transit, which operates buses and paratransit across most of the county. The agency also operates a seasonal replica trolley bus around Downtown Gig Harbor in the summer months and a microtransit zone that covers most of the city. The county government funds a Sound Transit Express route that serves stops in Gig Harbor and continues to Downtown Seattle during peak periods on weekdays.

Tacoma Narrows Airport, owned by the Pierce County government, is located southwest of Gig Harbor and primarily used for general aviation.

== Notable people ==
- Christophe Bisciglia, founder of Cloudera
- Marian Call, singer-songwriter
- Jini Dellaccio, photographer
- Jay Faerber, illustrated book writer
- Freddie Goodwin, former Manchester United soccer player and alumnus of the Busby Babes
- Tally Hall, soccer goalie
- Nevin Harrison, American sprint canoeist
- Scott Hatteberg, baseball player, played by Chris Pratt in Moneyball
- Doris Brown Heritage, athlete
- Charles W. Johnson, Associate Chief Justice of the Washington Supreme Court
- Kevin Johnson, former chief executive officer (CEO) of Starbucks
- Casey Kasem, actor, television and radio voiceover
- Derek Kilmer, U.S. representative, former Washington state senator and Washington state representative
- Dave Krusen, drummer, Rock Hall of Fame member
- Josh Lucas, actor
- Howard McLeod, medical scientist
- Bob Mortimer, evangelist
- Onision, YouTuber, lived in Gig Harbor
- Kenneth Pinyan, former Boeing engineer and bestiality practitioner
- Cory Procter, former NFL football player
- Christopher Rufo, conservative activist, senior fellow at the Manhattan Institute
- Austin Seferian-Jenkins, NFL football player
- Paul Skansi, NFL football player
- Kyle Stanley, professional golfer
- Keith Weller, former soccer player
- Matt Dinniman, author
