= Tacoma Airport =

Tacoma Airport may refer to:

- Seattle–Tacoma International Airport, international airport
- Tacoma Narrows Airport, public use airport
