= Washington State Route 166 =

State highway in Kitsap County, Washington, US

State Route 166

- SR 166 highlighted in red

Route information
- Auxiliary route of SR 16
- Maintained by WSDOT
- Length: 5.13 mi (8.26 km)
- Existed: 1993–present

Major junctions
- West end: SR 16 near Port Orchard
- East end: Whitter Avenue in Port Orchard

Location
- Country: United States
- State: Washington
- Counties: Kitsap

Highway system
- State highways in Washington; Interstate; US; State; Scenic; Pre-1964; 1964 renumbering; Former
← SR 165	→ SR 167

State Route 166 (SR 166) is a 5.13-mile (8.26 km) long state highway serving the city of Port Orchard within Kitsap County in the U.S. state of Washington. The highway begins at an interchange with SR 16 west of Port Orchard and travels along the Sinclair Inlet to Downtown Port Orchard and ends as Mile Hill Drive at Whitter Avenue near the eastern city limits. SR 166 was originally a branch of State Road 14 and later Primary State Highway 14 (PSH 14) before being designated as SR 160 after the 1964 highway renumbering. SR 160 was moved south in 1993 and the old alignment through Port Orchard became SR 166, which was extended in 2010 to the eastern city limits.

== Route description ==
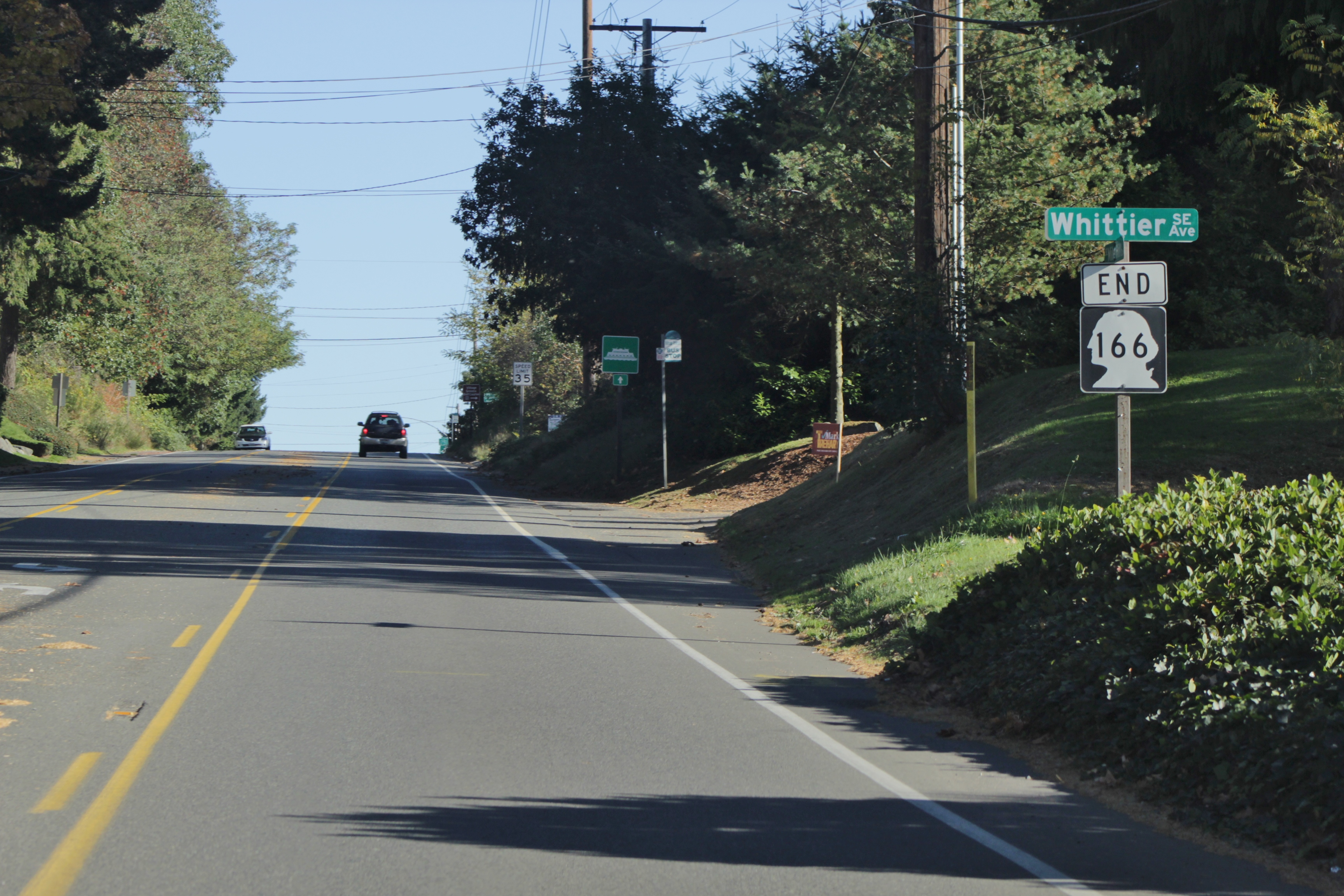
SR 166 at its eastern terminus

SR 166 begins as Bay Street in a partial interchange with SR 16 west of Port Orchard at the mouth of Anderson Creek, where it empties into the Sinclair Inlet. Bay Street travels northeast along the south shore of the Sinclair Inlet into Downtown Port Orchard, passing a foot ferry to Bremerton and the Port Orchard Library. The highway crosses over Blackjack Creek and turns south onto Bethel Avenue, passing between Sunset Lane Cemetery and South Kitsap Discovery Alternative High School before a roundabout, where SR 166 turns east onto Mile Hill Drive. The highway ends as Mile Hill Drive at an intersection with Whittier Avenue near the eastern city limits of Port Orchard.

Every year the Washington State Department of Transportation (WSDOT) conducts a series of surveys on its highways in the state to measure traffic volume. This is expressed in terms of annual average daily traffic (AADT), which is a measure of traffic volume for any average day of the year. In 2011, WSDOT calculated that between 14,000 and 18,000 vehicles per day used the highway on the Kitsap Peninsula, mostly in Downtown Port Orchard.

== History ==
SR 166 was established in 1964 as SR 160, beginning at SR 16 west of Port Orchard to Southworth. The highway was originally created in 1923 as a branch of the Navy Yard Highway, signed as State Road 14 from Port Orchard to Harper, and replaced a county road designated in 1916. The branch was included as part of PSH 14 during the creation of the Primary and secondary state highways in 1937. The PSH 14 branch was extended to Southworth in 1957, and became signed as SR 160 in the 1964 highway renumbering. SR 160 was re-aligned south in 1991 to better serve the Southworth–Fauntleroy ferry, but the new alignment was temporarily repealed until the creation of SR 166 in 1993. The highway between SR 16 and Port Orchard is located north of unstable slopes that cause mudslides after heavy rainfall. SR 166 was extended 0.15 miles (0.24 km) east on Mile Hill Drive in Port Orchard from Payseno Lane to Whittier Avenue in 2010, because Kitsap County refused to maintain the road within Port Orchard city limits. No major revisions to the highway have occurred since 2010.

== Major intersections ==
The entire highway is in Kitsap County.

Location	mi	km	Destinations	Notes
	0.00	0.00	SR 16 west to SR 3 – Bremerton, Poulsbo	Western terminus; interchange; westbound exit and eastbound entrance
Port Orchard	5.13	8.26	Whittier Avenue	Eastern terminus; continues as Mile Hill Drive
1.000 mi = 1.609 km; 1.000 km = 0.621 mi: Incomplete access
