= Washington State Route 160 =

State highway in Kitsap and King Counties, Washington, US

State Route 160

- SR 160 highlighted in red

Route information
- Auxiliary route of SR 16
- Maintained by WSDOT
- Length: 7.47 mi (12.02 km) Mileage does not include ferry route
- Existed: 1964–present

Major junctions
- West end: SR 16 in Port Orchard
- Vashon Heights ferry terminal; Fauntleroy ferry terminal in Seattle
- East end: Fauntleroy Way in Seattle

Location
- Country: United States
- State: Washington
- Counties: Kitsap, King

Highway system
- State highways in Washington; Interstate; US; State; Scenic; Pre-1964; 1964 renumbering; Former
← SR 155	→ SR 161

State Route 160 (SR 160) is a 7.47-mile-long (12.02 km) long state highway serving Kitsap and King counties in the U.S. state of Washington. The highway begins at an interchange with SR 16 in Port Orchard and travels east to the Southworth ferry terminal, where the route continues onto a ferry to Vashon Heights, the former southern terminus of SR 339, and further east to end at the Fauntleroy ferry terminal in Seattle.

SR 160 was established during the 1964 highway renumbering beginning at SR 16 west of Port Orchard traveling east to Southworth along the Carr Inlet. The corridor was previously a branch of Primary State Highway 14 (PSH 14), established in 1937. The highway was moved south in 1991 and the Southworth–Vashon–Fauntleroy ferry was added in 1994.

== Route description ==
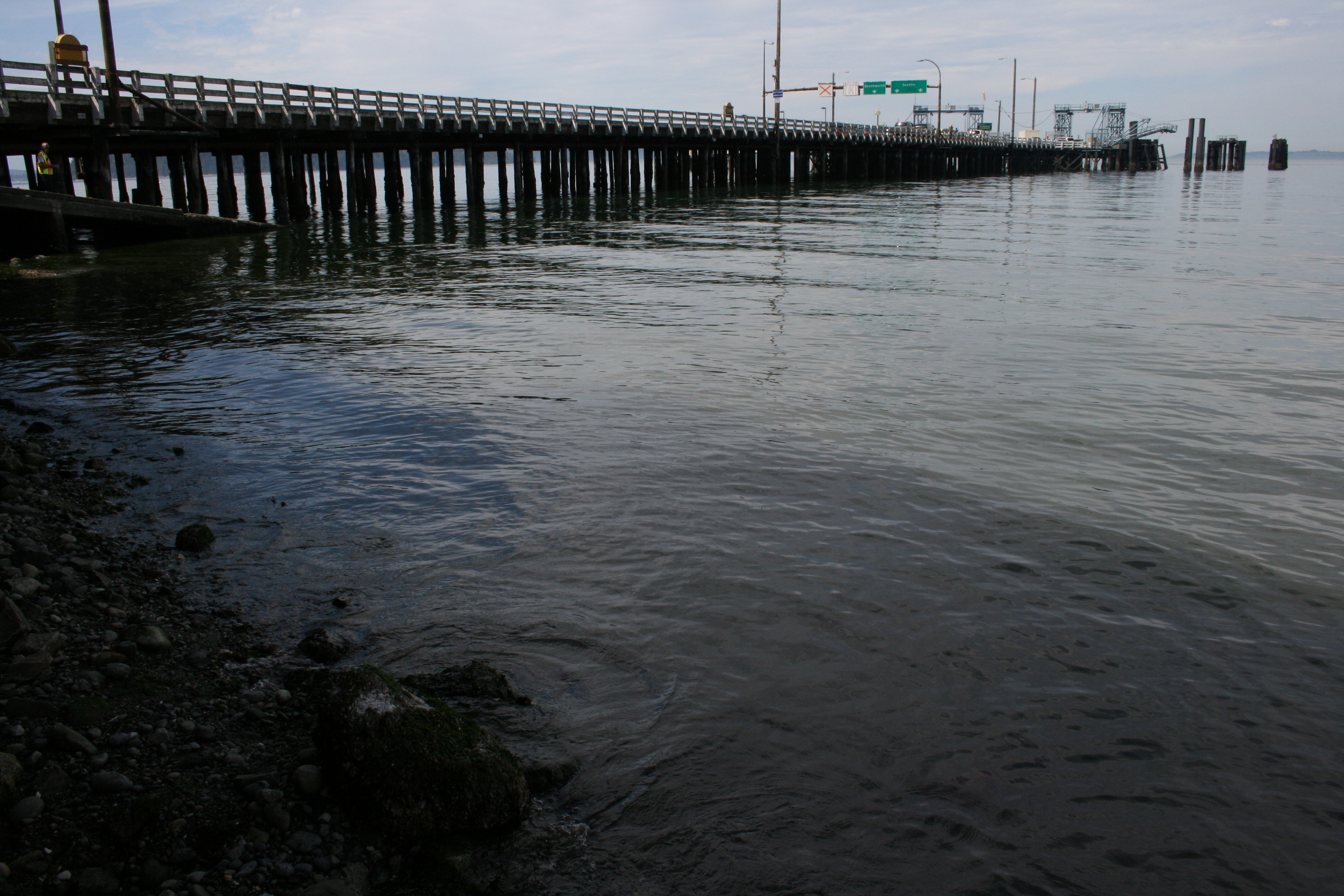
The Vashon Heights ferry terminal, served by SR 160 between the Southworth and Fauntleroy terminals

SR 160 begins as Sedgewick Road at a diamond interchange with parent route SR 16 south of Port Orchard in Kitsap County. The highway briefly travels northeast before turning east and entering East Port Orchard, serving a suburban area north of Long Lake. The roadway continues east and passes John Sedgwick Junior High School before turning north into Southworth, Within Southworth, Sedgewick Road ends as SR 160 travels onto a ferry route owned and operated by Washington State Ferries (WSF).

The Evergreen State class ferries MV Klahowya and MV Tillikum, as well as Issaquah 130 class ferry MV Issaquah serve the route, which travels east from Southworth into King County. The ferries stop at the Vashon Heights terminal, intersecting SR 339 (the designation for the former Vashon–Downtown Seattle run), before continuing east to the Fauntleroy ferry terminal in West Seattle.

The ferry route is 45 minutes long, as the MV Klahowya and MV Tillikum travel at a speed of 13 knots (15 mph), and the MV Issaquah travels at 16 knots (18 mph). WSF operates the ferry every weekday with 33 crossings and weekends with 26 crossings, as a $5 toll for adult passengers is charged with prepaid Wave2Go cards being accepted.

Every year the Washington State Department of Transportation (WSDOT) conducts a series of surveys on its highways in the state to measure traffic volume. This is expressed in terms of annual average daily traffic (AADT), which is a measure of traffic volume for any average day of the year. In 2011, WSDOT calculated that between 1,500 and 24,000 vehicles per day used the highway on the Kitsap Peninsula, mostly at the SR 16 interchange in Port Orchard. The Southworth–Vashon–Fauntleroy ferry carried 2.886 million passengers and 1.674 million vehicles in 2012, according to WSF statistics.

== History ==
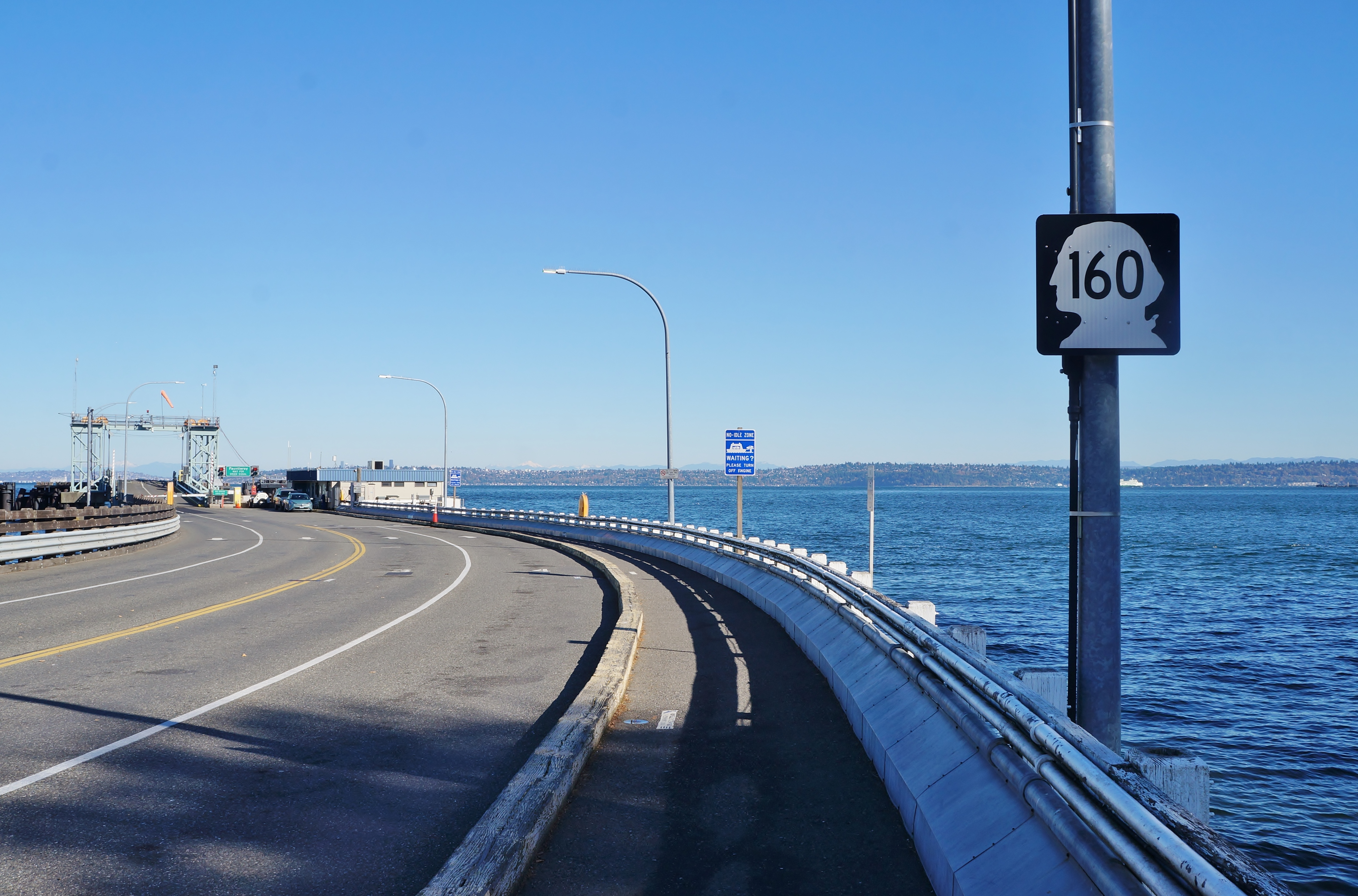
The Southworth ferry terminal, which served as the terminus of SR 160 until 1994

SR 160 was established in 1964 as a highway beginning at SR 16 west of Port Orchard to Southworth. This highway was originally created in 1923 as a branch of the Navy Yard Highway, signed as State Road 14 from Port Orchard to Harper. The highway was to terminate at a ferry dock in Harper, which was constructed by Kitsap County following an agreement with King County to begin ferry service from there to Vashon Island and Seattle. The general routing of the "water level" highway was established in 1919 and it was completed by 1921.

The branch was included as part of PSH 14 during the creation of the Primary and secondary state highways in 1937. The PSH 14 branch was extended to Southworth in 1957, and became signed as SR 160 in the 1964 highway renumbering. SR 160 was re-aligned south onto Sedgewick Road in 1991 to better serve the Southworth–Fauntleroy ferry.

The realignment of SR 160 was set to take effect on April 1, 1992, but was temporarily repealed by the legislature due to a mudslide on February 14 that closed the highway west of Port Orchard. The state government retained ownership of the highway through Port Orchard during cleanup operations, which allowed a partial reopening on April 17 but necessitated later closures for further inspection of unstable slopes. Through traffic reopened on August 28, 1992. In 1993, SR 160 was moved to Sedgewick Road as planned and a portion of its old route was designated as SR 166. The Southworth–Fauntleroy ferry was added to SR 160 in 1994 along with the rest of the Washington State Ferries system. No major revisions to the route of the highway have occurred since 1994.

== Major intersections ==
County	Location	mi	km	Destinations	Notes
Kitsap	Port Orchard	0.00– 0.09	0.00– 0.14	SR 16 – Bremerton, Tacoma	Interchange
Kitsap	Southworth	7.47	12.02	Southworth Ferry Terminal – Vashon, Fauntleroy	
Puget Sound		7.47– 9.40	12.02– 15.13	Southworth–Vashon Ferry	
King	Vashon	9.40	15.13	SR 339 (Vashon Highway) – Vashon Heights Ferry Terminal	
Puget Sound		9.40– 12.80	15.13– 20.60	Vashon–Fauntleroy Ferry	
1.000 mi = 1.609 km; 1.000 km = 0.621 mi
