= Peninsula Gateway =

- Type: Weekly newspaper
- Owner: McClatchy
- Founder: Ira Case
- Founded: 1917 (as Bay Island News)
- Language: English
- City: Gig Harbor, Washington
- Circulation: 4,993 (as of 2022)
- ISSN: 1066-2065
- OCLC number: 17331527
- Website: gateline.com

The Peninsula Gateway is a newspaper based out of Gig Harbor, Washington, founded in 1917. The newspaper covers the local news of Gig Harbor and Key Peninsula. The Peninsula Gateway is published once a week on Wednesdays. Its online content can be found via the websites News Tribune and the Seattle Times.

== History ==
The Bay Island News was started in May 1917 by Ira Case. A few years later the paper was purchased in August 1923 from F. S. Drummond by Charles Edward Trombley, former editor of the Tillamook Herald. He then changed the name to The Peninsula Gateway. Trombley published the paper for 30 years until his death in 1953.

His widow sold the paper in January 1955 to Robert H. Platt Sr. Years later he sold Gateway to his sons Robert H. Platt Jr. and John Platt in 1969. Thomas C. Taylor, former publisher of the Newport News Times and Lincoln County Leader, purchased a half-interest in the paper with his father Walt Taylor in May 1981. John Platt sold the Taylor family the remaining shares in 1987.

Walt and Betty Taylor ran the paper with their son and daughter-in-law Tom and Darlene Taylor until 1995, when the newspaper was purchased by McClatchy, which also owns the News Tribune. At the time, the Gateway had 11,000 subscribers.
