= Good to Go (toll collection system) =

Electronic toll collection system in Washington state

- An example of a Good to Go! sticker pass
- Industry: Electronic toll collection
- Founded: July 2007
- Area served: Washington (state)
- Website: wsdot.wa.gov/goodtogo mygoodtogo.com

Good to Go, stylized as GoodToGo!, is the electronic toll collection program managed by the Washington State Department of Transportation on all current toll and future projects in the U.S. state of Washington. Regular Good to Go customers may set up an account from which tolls are automically deducted. Vehicles that are not linked to an account are photographed and a toll bill is sent to the registered owner by U.S. mail (at a higher toll rate).

The system debuted in July 2007 on the eastbound span of the Tacoma Narrows Bridge and has since expanded to include high-occupancy toll (HOT) lanes on State Route 167 and Interstate 405, as well as the Evergreen Point Floating Bridge on State Route 520, and the State Route 99 tunnel in Seattle. The Good to Go program is similar to other electronic tolling around the country such as FasTrak in California and E-ZPass in the eastern United States.

== Fares ==
Drivers may set up a pre-paid, or pay as you go Good to Go account. The pre-paid account requires a starting balance of $30. Other types of accounts exist for fleet management or for paying with cash, but those must be set up manually. The account setup also requires either purchasing and activating a Good to Go Pass that is affixed to a vehicle, or by registering the license plate. Drivers may select from multiple pass types such as sticker, declarable occupancy (Flex), motorcycle, or license plate passes. For pre-paid accounts charges are made to the account balance, and when the balance is low or insufficient, the account is replenished. For pay as you go accounts deductions occur in batches.

Good to Go is available for use on the following highways and facilities:

- Tacoma Narrows Bridge on SR 16 (eastbound only)
- High-occupancy toll lanes on SR 167 from Auburn to Renton
- Evergreen Point Floating Bridge on SR 520
- High-occupancy toll lanes on I-405 from Bellevue to Lynnwood
- State Route 99 tunnel on SR 99 in Seattle
- SR 509 Expressway in Seattle
- SR 167 Expressway in Tacoma

Tolls on all highways except the Tacoma Narrows Bridge are variable, depending on the time of day. For HOT lane systems (also known as express toll lanes), tolls are set within a minimum and maximum value, and vary based on current traffic conditions.

A discounted fare for low-income households was authorized in 2025 and began taking applications in late 2026. It applies a 50 percent discount for use of the SR 509 and SR 167 expressways in King and Pierce counties.

== Operations ==
ETAN Tolling operates the Good to Go! customer service systems, and Shimmick staffs the call centers with personnel.

WSDOT completed a major overhaul of the system in July 2021. Some of the changes included the elimination of a required $30 pre-paid account, and the ability to pay a negative balance online. The changeover, which included a two-week system blackout, was scheduled to take place in June but was postponed by a month due to errors found in final tests.

Some of the system's cameras are unable to handle long stretches of sub-freezing temperatures. In January 2024, the HOT lanes on I-405 and SR 167 were temporarily converted into HOV-only lanes while their cameras and sensors were turned off.

== History ==
=== Tacoma Narrows Bridge ===
The toll collection system in place for the Tacoma Narrows Bridge, which carries State Route 16 between the Kitsap Peninsula and Tacoma, has standard toll booth collection lanes as well as three electronic toll lanes that allow for tolls to be deducted from a prepaid account. Vehicles in this lane must have a Good to Go account when crossing the toll plaza through the electronic toll lanes, or they will receive a bill in the mail. Only the eastbound span, built in 2007, is tolled; westbound traffic on the older bridge is not tolled.

Every car that travels through the Good to Go electronic toll lanes is automatically photographed. If a vehicle passes through the electronic toll lanes without a transponder or Good to Go account, the "Pay by Mail" toll will be charged to the registered owner of the vehicle via the license plate information per the Washington State Department of Licensing. In the case of a malfunctioning transponder, the toll charge will be posted to the account associated with that license plate number.

The Tacoma Narrows Bridge is the only facility with physical toll booths.

=== SR 520 floating bridge ===
On December 29, 2011, tolling started on the original SR 520 floating bridge, which ran between Seattle and the Eastside suburbs. The revenue generated from the tolls is used to help pay for the replacement bridge, also tolled, which opened in 2016. All tolling is electronic with no tollbooths. Tolling for people without Good to Go passes is done by license plate, and customer are sent the "Pay by Mail" toll rate, which includes a processing and mail fee.

=== SR 167 HOT (High Occupancy Toll) Lanes ===
The pilot project on State Route 167 was launched in 2008 to test a new congestion management tool in Washington, allowing solo drivers to pay an electronic toll for use of existing high-occupancy vehicle lanes, without having to stop. It consists of a single HOT lane in each direction running along State Route 167 between Renton and Auburn in King County. Carpools of two people or more, transit, vanpools and motorcycles may still use the HOT as a regular HOV lane, free of charge but will need the transponder as it is the only way to communicate that you are an HOV vehicle: all vehicles without a transponder are tolled even with multiple people in the car. If vehicles have two or more occupants and do not have a declarable occupancy (Flex) pass, the transponder must be covered by a metallic object or they will be charged a toll. The pilot project was extended through June 2013 by the state legislature in 2011. In 2016 the HOT lane was extended 3.5 miles (5.6 km) south to Algona.

The intent of the project was to utilize and manage the excess capacity in the HOV lane to improve traffic throughput in adjacent lanes. Toll rates vary based on the level of congestion to ensure that traffic in the HOT lane speed are at least 45 mph, even when the regular lanes are congested.

=== I-405 HOT Lanes ===
WSDOT operates high occupancy toll lanes (HOT lanes) on Interstate 405, the main bypass around Seattle. The HOT lanes between Bellevue and Lynnwood opened on September 27, 2015, and included the construction of an auxiliary lane between Bothell and Bellevue. WSDOT is in development of a 40-mile (64 km) system of HOT lanes on the entire length of I-405 and nearby SR 167, with the southern half from Bellevue to Renton scheduled to be completed in 2024. A direct flyover ramp in Renton between the HOT lanes on I-405 and SR 167 began construction in 2016 and was opened four months ahead of schedule on February 21, 2019.

=== SR 99 Tunnel ===
The State Route 99 Tunnel, like the State Route 520 floating bridge, operates exclusively with open road tolling; those without a Good to Go transponder and account are charged a higher rate via license plate tolling.

Tolling commenced for the State Route 99 tunnel on November 9, 2019.

=== SR 509 Expressway ===
The SR 509 Expressway, operates with open road tolling, like the SR 99 Tunnel and the SR 520 floating bridge, with those without a Good to Go pass being charged $2 dollars extra than those with a Good to Go pass. There was initially no tolling on the expressway, until tolling commenced on September 29, 2025.

== Performance ==
WSDOT's toll collection system replacement project was delayed by more than two years due to missed deadlines and other issues with a vendor, according to an audit conducted by the state auditor. According to the audit, the project had exceeded its budget by $13 million and was pushed back several times due to issues adjusting to state requirements and software systems.
