= Blackjack Creek =

Stream in the American state of Missouri

Coordinates: 38°52′30″N 93°37′04″W

Blackjack Creek (also known as Black Jack Branch) is a stream in Johnson County in the U.S. state of Missouri. It is a tributary of the Blackwater River.

Blackjack Creek was named for the blackjack oak trees lining its course.

== See also ==
- List of rivers of Missouri
