= Key Center, Washington =

- CDP
- Interactive map of Key Center, Washington
- Coordinates: 47°21′45″N 122°44′15″W
- Country: United States
- State: Washington
- County: Pierce
- Elevation: 200 ft (61 m)

Population (2010)
  - Total: 3,692
- Time zone: UTC-8 (Pacific (PST))
  - Summer (DST): UTC-7 (PDT)
- ZIP code: 98335
- Area code: 253
- GNIS feature ID: 2584989

Key Center is a census-designated place (CDP) in Pierce County, Washington, United States. As of the 2020 census, Key Center had a population of 3,863. The community is located on Key Peninsula.

== Demographics ==
Historical population
Census	Pop.	Note	%±
2010	3,692		—
2020	3,863		4.6%
U.S. Decennial Census; 2000 2010

Key Center first appeared as a census designated place in the 2010 U.S. census.

=== Racial and ethnic composition ===
Key Center CDP, Washington – Racial and ethnic composition Note: the US Census treats Hispanic/Latino as an ethnic category. This table excludes Latinos from the racial categories and assigns them to a separate category. Hispanics/Latinos may be of any race.
Race / Ethnicity (NH = Non-Hispanic)	Pop 2010	Pop 2020	% 2010	% 2020
White alone (NH)	3,246	3,192	87.92%	82.63%
Black or African American alone (NH)	22	28	0.60%	0.72%
Native American or Alaska Native alone (NH)	29	29	0.79%	0.75%
Asian alone (NH)	50	46	1.35%	1.19%
Native Hawaiian or Pacific Islander alone (NH)	18	25	0.49%	0.65%
Other race alone (NH)	7	34	0.19%	0.88%
Mixed race or Multiracial (NH)	154	304	4.17%	7.87%
Hispanic or Latino (any race)	166	205	4.50%	5.31%
Total	3,692	3,863	100.00%	100.00%
