= Tacoma Narrows Airport =

Airport in Gig Harbor, Washington, United States of America

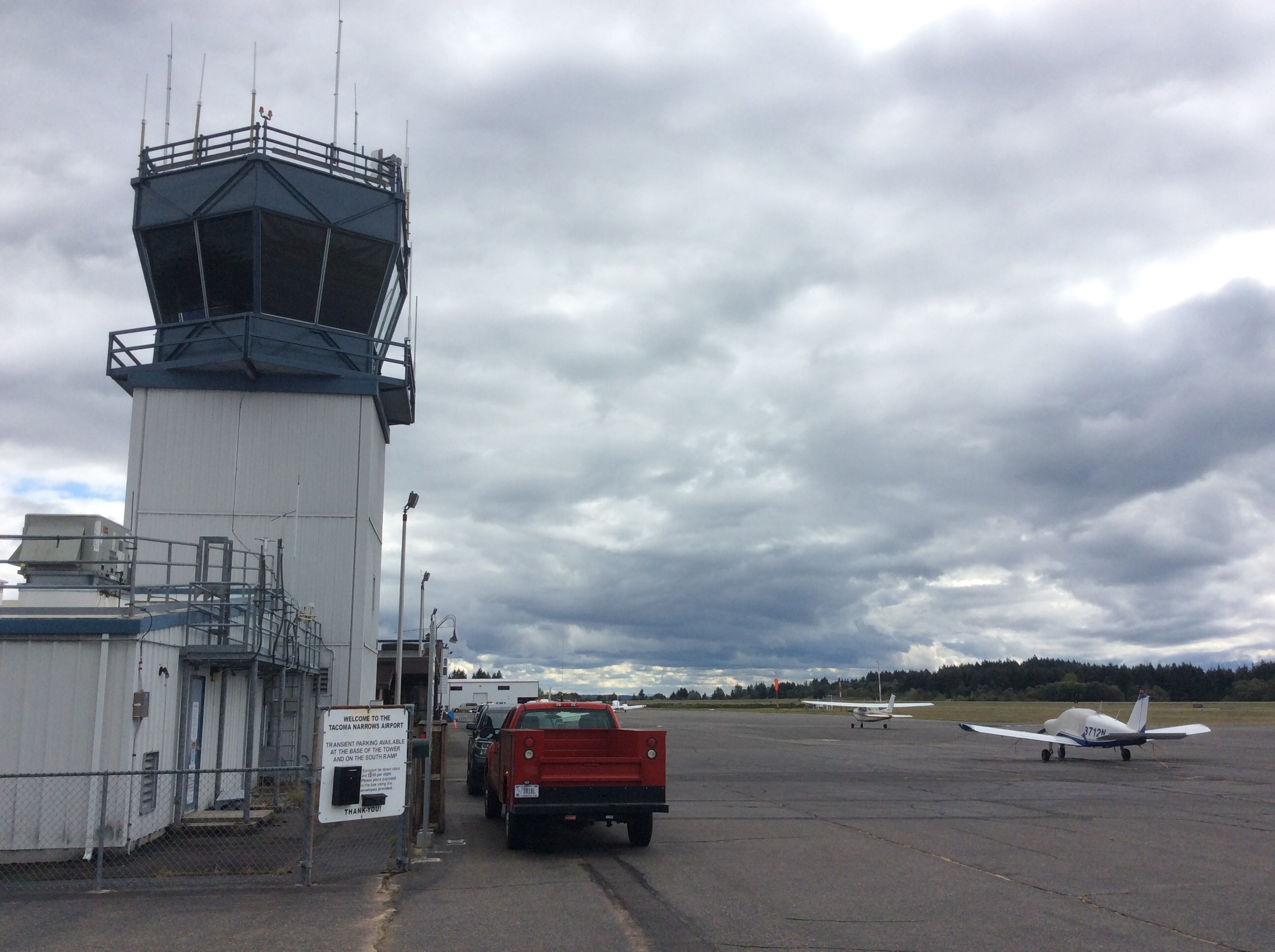
- IATA: TIW; ICAO: KTIW; FAA LID: TIW

Summary
- Airport type: Public
- Owner: Pierce County Public Works & Utilities
- Serves: Tacoma, Washington
- Location: Gig Harbor, Washington
- Elevation AMSL: 295 ft / 90 m
- Coordinates: 47°16′05″N 122°34′41″W
- Interactive map of Tacoma Narrows Airport

Runways
Direction	Length		Surface
Direction	ft	m	Surface
17/35	5,002	1,525	Asphalt

Statistics
- Aircraft operations (2019): 53,276
- Based aircraft (2019): 130
- Source: Federal Aviation Administration

Tacoma Narrows Airport (IATA: TIW, ICAO: KTIW, FAA LID: TIW) is a county-owned, public-use airport located 5 mi (8.0 km) west of the central business district of Tacoma, a city in Pierce County, Washington, United States. It is situated south of Gig Harbor, Washington, one mile southwest of the Tacoma Narrows Bridge. The airport was owned by the city of Tacoma until 2008, when it was purchased by Pierce County.

It is included in the Federal Aviation Administration (FAA) National Plan of Integrated Airport Systems for 2019–2023, in which it is categorized as a local general aviation facility. There is no commercial airline at this airport; the closest airport with commercial airline service is Seattle–Tacoma International Airport, about 18 miles (29 km) to the northeast.

== Facilities and aircraft ==
FAA diagram

Tacoma Narrows Airport covers an area of 644 acres (261 ha) at an elevation of 295 feet (90 m) above mean sea level. It has one runway designated 17/35 with an asphalt surface measuring 5,002 by 100 feet (1,525 x 46 m).

For the 12-month period ending December 31, 2019, the airport had 53,276 aircraft operations, an average of 146 per day: 97% general aviation, 2% air taxi, and 1% military. At that time, there were 130 aircraft based at this airport: 109 single-engine, 11 multi-engine, 6 jet and 4 helicopters.

== Cargo airlines ==
Airlines	Destinations
Ameriflight	Portland (OR), Seattle–Boeing

== Commercial airlines ==
Tacoma Narrows Airport is not served by any scheduled commercial carriers. Currently PerryCook Flight Services provides non-scheduled commercial air taxi charter service from TIW.

During the 1960s it was served by West Coast Airlines. During the late 1960s and early 1970s, it was served by Hughes Airwest. An excerpt from the July 1, 1972, timetable shows nonstop routes to Seattle and Olympia—the latter continuing on to Hoquiam/Aberdeen, Astoria, and Portland.

The airport’s runway length and surrounding land use limit its suitability for regular airline service, and local government officials have consistently indicated that expansion to accommodate larger commercial aircraft is not supported by the airport or by airlines.

== General aviation ==
- FBOs:
  - Narrows Aviation Air Center
  - Pavco Flight Center
- Aircraft charter:
  - Clay Lacy Aviation
  - PerryCook Flight Services

== History ==
The Tacoma Narrows Airport was first known as the Tacoma Industrial Airport as early as 1958 but was not officially named as such until 1961. One of the first published uses of the airport's current name appeared in a letter to the editor to The News Tribune, wherein a Gig Harbor resident suggested changing the airport to its current name in 1980. The name was changed in 1982 in an attempt to quell residents' concerns over the nominally industrial nature of the airport and its impact on the area.

The Tacoma Narrows Airport has had a tumultuous history, consisting of legal issues involving the land usage, securing funding, and resident concerns among others. The land was obtained through condemnation proceedings in 1961, when the City Council authorized an application to submit to the FAA in a 7-2 vote. City Council approval, however, did not reflect the approval of the residents. In an initiative headed by Stanford Pulliam, residents sought to put the airport (often referred to as the “Peninsula Airport”) to a public vote. If this initiative was approved, it would also prohibit the city spending any money on the airport unless voted on by the electorate. The initiative was stopped when Judge Bertil E. Johnson found that the initiative was a referendum and did not abide by the proper city ordinances. This ruling allowed the city to proceed with hearings regarding the value and further steps of action regarding the court-reinforced condemnations.

Funding remained an issue, as the city estimated that the cost of the airport and the clearing of land, grading of ground, and paving would amount to about one million dollars. However, in January of 1968, there were only enough funds to provide for the construction of the north taxiway. This would mean that if a plane did not land in a short enough distance, they would be required to taxi-back on the runway to the closest taxiway exit. This presented a significant safety hazard, as it prevented aircraft from exiting the runway in a timely manner. In order to secure the funds for the remaining taxiway, an ordinance was created and presented to the City Council in May of 1968 which would take the required $500,000 from the city's LID guaranty fund and allocate it into the airport construction fund. This $500,000 would also be matched by the FAA to allow for significant construction to occur.

== See also ==
- List of airports in Washington
