= Tacoma Narrows =

Waterway between the Kitsap Peninsula and Tacoma in Puget Sound, Washington, US

Coordinates: 47.28°N 122.54°W

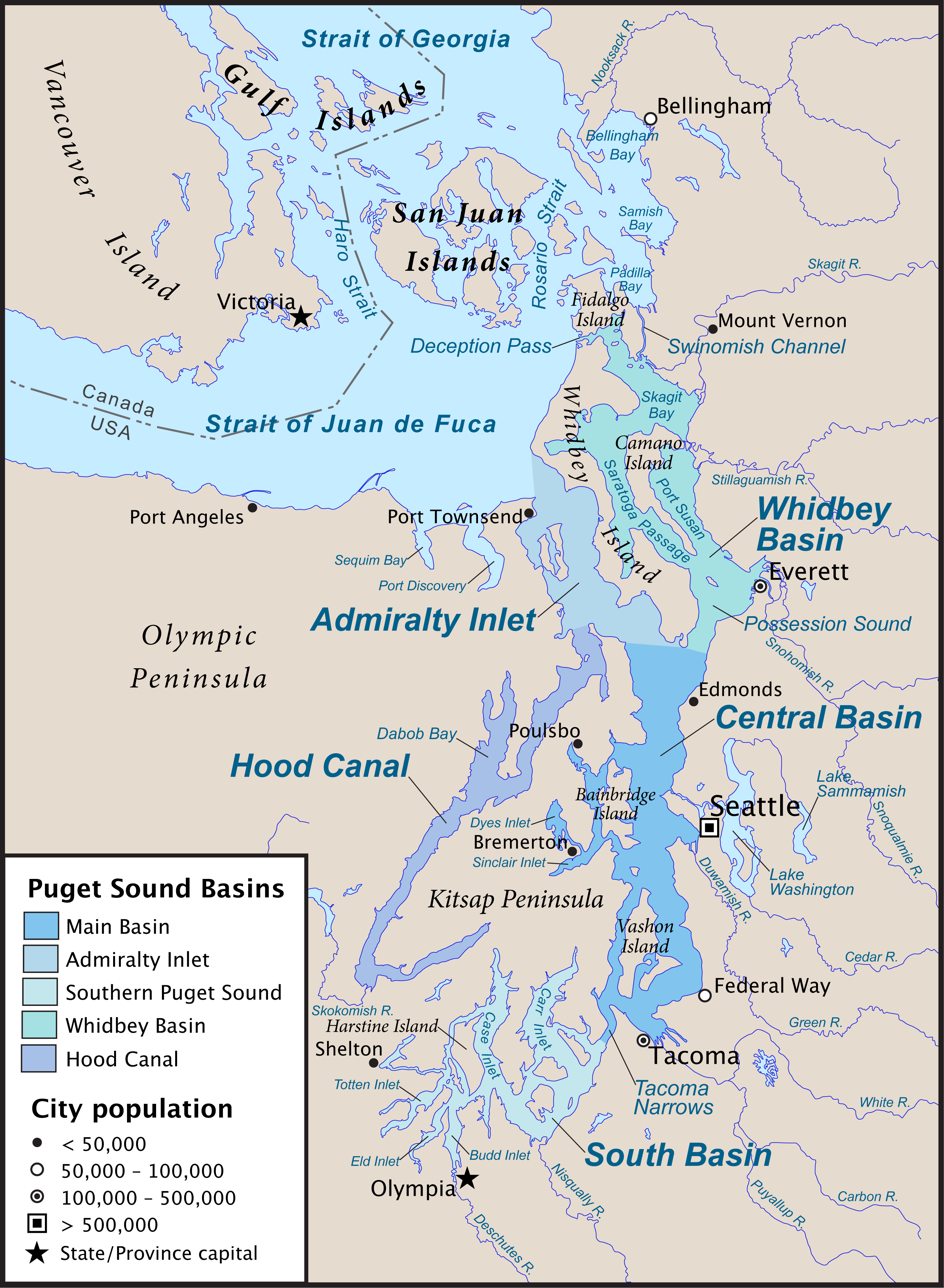
The Tacoma Narrows separate the South Basin of Puget Sound from the Central Basin.

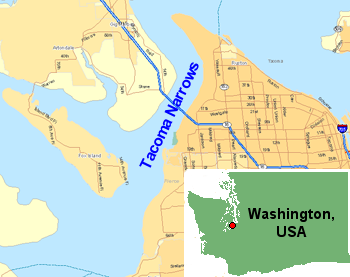
Map of the Tacoma Narrows

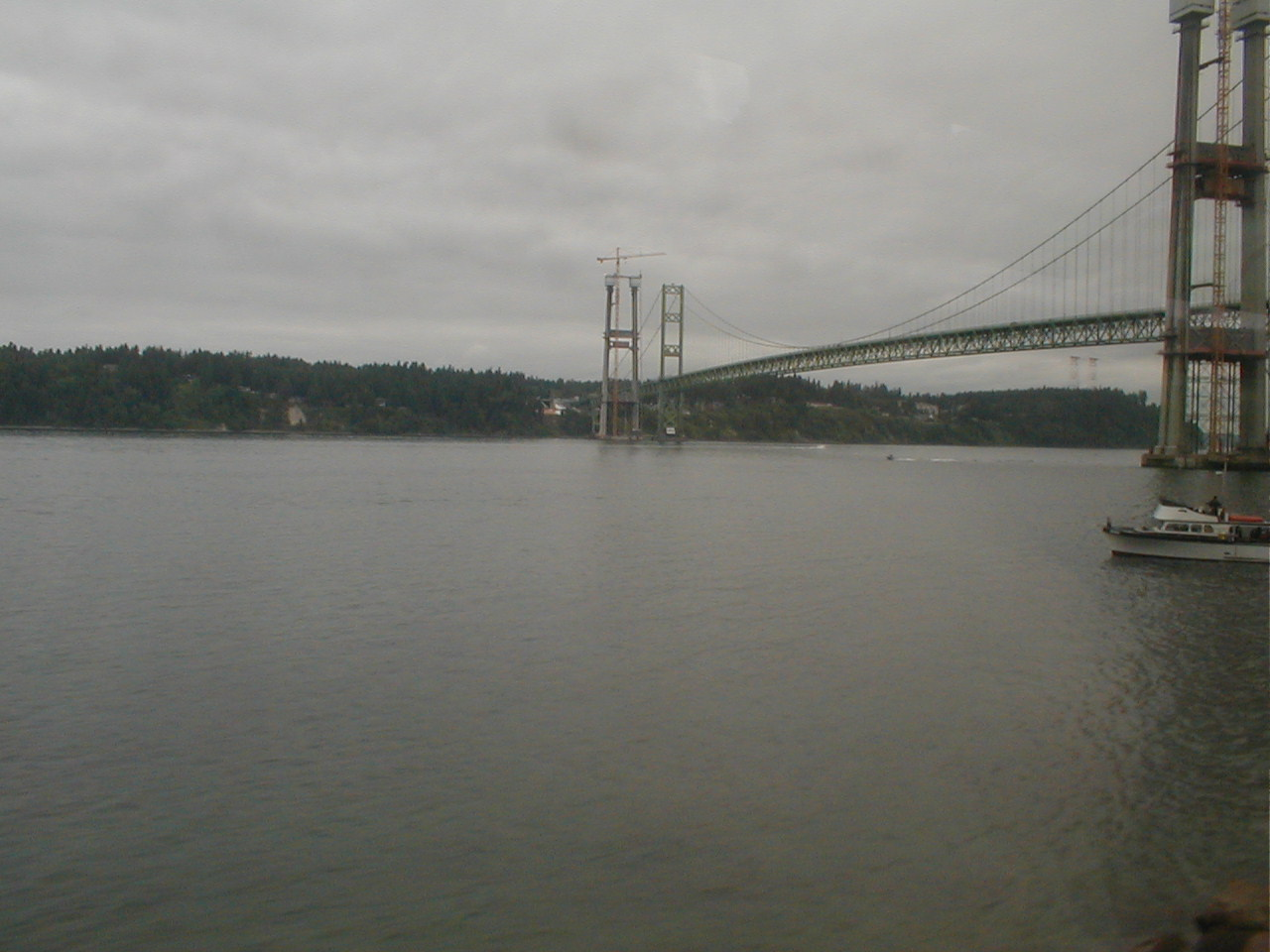
The Tacoma Narrows as viewed from Tacoma, facing northwest towards the Kitsap Peninsula. The towers for the 2007 Tacoma Narrows Bridge are under construction in this photograph; the 1950 Tacoma Narrows Bridge is to the right of the new bridge construction. (2005)

The Tacoma Narrows (or the Narrows) is a strait which is part of Puget Sound in the U.S. state of Washington. A navigable maritime waterway between glacial landforms, the Narrows separates the Kitsap Peninsula from the city of Tacoma.

The Narrows is spanned by the twin Tacoma Narrows Bridges (State Route 16). An earlier bridge collapsed shortly after it opened.

In 1841 Charles Wilkes, during the United States Exploring Expedition, named the strait simply Narrows. Its name was formally set as The Narrows by Henry Kellett during the British Admiralty chart reorganization of 1847.
