= Tacoma Narrows Bridge =

Twin suspension bridges spanning the Tacoma Narrows strait in Washington

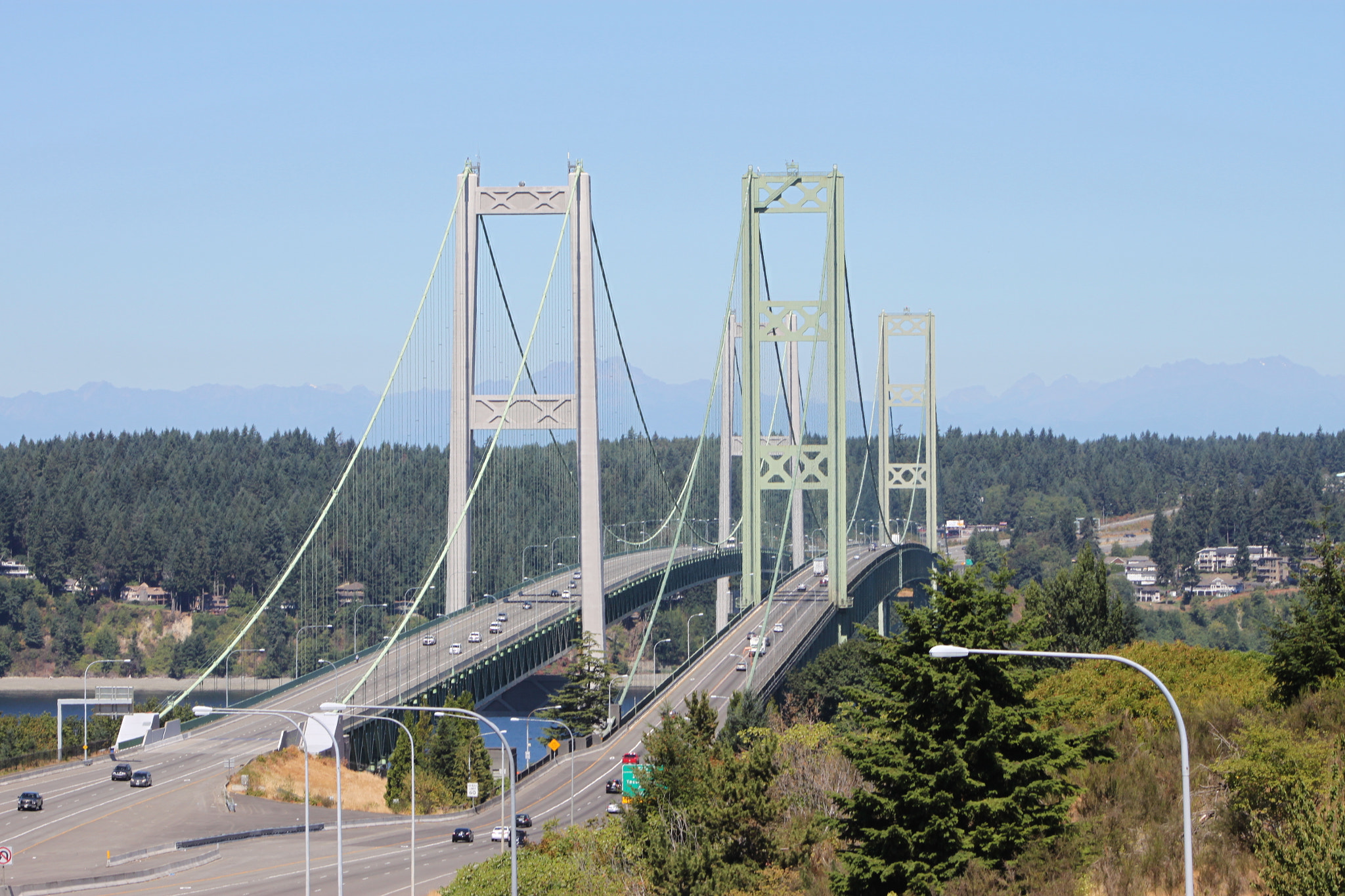
- The bridges in 2015, as seen from the Tacoma side. 1950 bridge on the right, 2007 bridge on the left.
- Coordinates: 47°16′5″N 122°33′2″W
- Carries: 8 lanes of SR 16, cyclists and pedestrians
- Crosses: Tacoma Narrows
- Locale: Tacoma to the Kitsap Peninsula United States
- Maintained by: Washington State Department of Transportation

Characteristics
- Design: Twin suspension
- Total length: 5,400 ft (1,645.92 m)
- Longest span: 2,800 ft (853.44 m)
- Clearance below: 187.5 ft (57.15 m)

History
- Construction start: April 12, 1948 (westbound); October 4, 2002 (eastbound)
- Opened: October 14, 1950 (westbound); July 15, 2007 (eastbound)

Statistics
- Toll: Eastbound only (passenger car): $5.50 (cash/credit price) $4.50 (transponder price) $6.50 (pay by mail)

Location
- Interactive map of Tacoma Narrows Bridge

The Tacoma Narrows Bridge is a pair of twin suspension bridges that span the Tacoma Narrows strait of Puget Sound in Pierce County, Washington. The bridges connect the city of Tacoma with the Kitsap Peninsula and carry State Route 16 (known as Primary State Highway 14 until 1964) over the strait. Historically, the name "Tacoma Narrows Bridge" has applied to the original bridge, nicknamed "Galloping Gertie", which opened in July 1940 but collapsed possibly because of aeroelastic flutter four months later, as well as to the successor of that bridge, which opened in 1950 and still stands today as the westbound lanes of the present-day two-bridge complex.

The original Tacoma Narrows Bridge opened on July 1, 1940. The original bridge received its nickname "Galloping Gertie" for the vertical movement of the deck observed by construction workers during windy conditions. While engineers and engineering professor F. B. Farquharson were hired to seek ways to stop the odd movements, months' experiments were unsuccessful. The bridge became known for its pitching deck, and collapsed into Puget Sound the morning of November 7, 1940, under high wind conditions. Engineering issues, as well as the United States' involvement in World War II, postponed plans to replace the bridge for several years; the new bridge was opened on October 14, 1950.

By 1990, population growth and development on the Kitsap Peninsula had caused traffic on the bridge to exceed its design capacity; as a result, in 1998 Washington voters approved a measure to support building a parallel bridge. After a series of protests and court battles, construction began in 2002 and the new bridge opened to carry eastbound traffic on July 16, 2007, while the 1950 bridge was reconfigured to carry westbound traffic.

At the time of their construction, both the 1940 and 1950 bridges were the third-longest suspension bridges in the world in terms of main span length, behind the Golden Gate Bridge and George Washington Bridge. The 1950 and 2007 bridges are as of 2017 the fifth-longest suspension bridge spans in the United States and the 43rd-longest in the world.

Tolls were charged on the bridge for the entire four-month service life of the original span, as well as the first 15 years of the 1950 bridge. In 1965, the bridge's construction bonds plus interest were paid off, and the state ceased toll collection on the bridge. Over 40 years later, tolls were reinstated as part of the financing of the twin span, and are at present collected only from vehicles traveling eastbound.

== Original bridge (1940) ==
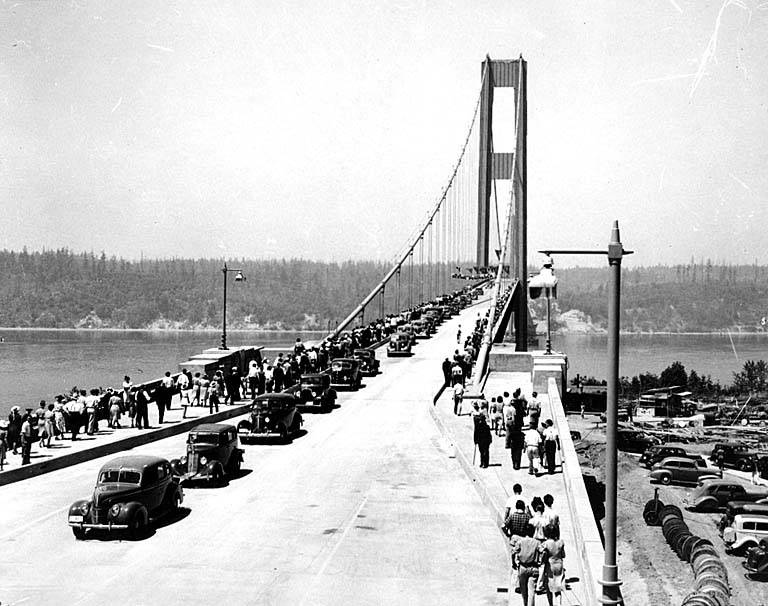
Opening day, July 1, 1940

The desire for the construction of a bridge in this location dates back to 1889 with a Northern Pacific Railway proposal for a trestle bridge; however, it was only in the late 1920s that interest in this project was revived. In 1937, the Washington State legislature created the Washington State Toll Bridge Authority and appropriated $5,000 to study the request by Tacoma and Pierce County for a bridge over the Narrows. The bridge was designed by Leon Moisseiff and cost $6.4 million.

The collapse of the original bridge.

The first Tacoma Narrows Bridge opened to traffic on July 1, 1940. Its main span collapsed into the Tacoma Narrows four months later on November 7, 1940, at 11:00 a.m. (Pacific time) possibly as a result of aeroelastic flutter caused by a 42 mph (68 km/h) wind. The bridge collapse had lasting effects on science and engineering. In many undergraduate physics texts, the event is presented as an example of elementary forced resonance, with the wind providing an external periodic frequency that matched the natural structural frequency; the cause is still debated by engineers today. A contributing factor was its solid sides which did not allow wind to pass through the bridge's deck. Thus, its design allowed the bridge to catch the wind and sway, which ultimately took it down. It was the first suspension bridge to utilize these solid I-beams as a form of support for the road deck, as other bridges would incorporate trusses in their designs in order to catch the wind. Its failure also boosted research in the field of bridge aerodynamics and aeroelastic fields which have influenced the designs of all the world's great long-span bridges built since 1940.

There were no human deaths in the collapse of the bridge. The only fatality was a Cocker Spaniel named Tubby, who perished after he was abandoned in a car on the bridge by his owner, Leonard Coatsworth. Professor Frederick Burt Farquharson, an engineer from the University of Washington who had been involved in the design of the bridge, tried to rescue Tubby but was bitten by the terrified dog when he attempted to remove him. The collapse of the bridge was recorded on Kodachrome 16 mm film by Barney Elliott and Harbine Monroe, owners of The Camera Shop in Tacoma, and shows Farquharson leaving the bridge after trying to rescue Tubby and making observations in the middle of the bridge. The film was subsequently sold to Paramount Studios, who then duplicated the footage for newsreels in black-and-white and distributed the film worldwide to movie theaters. Castle Films also received distribution rights for 8 mm home video.

Elliott and Monroe's original films of the construction and collapse of the bridge were shot on 16 mm Kodachrome color film, but most copies in circulation are in black and white because newsreels of the day copied the film onto 35 mm black-and-white stock. There were also film speed discrepancies between Monroe and Elliot's footage, with Monroe filming his footage in 24 fps while Elliott had filmed his footage at 16 fps. As a result, most copies in circulation also show the bridge oscillating approximately 50% faster than real time, due to an assumption during conversion that the film was shot at 24 frames per second rather than the actual 16 fps. In 1998, The Tacoma Narrows Bridge Collapse was selected for preservation in the United States National Film Registry by the Library of Congress as being "culturally, historically, or aesthetically significant". This footage is commonly shown to engineering, architecture, and physics students as a means to teach about engineering disaster.

The dismantling of the towers and side spans — having survived the collapse of the main span, but being damaged beyond repair — began shortly after the collapse and continued into May 1943. The United States' participation in World War II, as well as engineering and finance issues, delayed plans to replace the bridge.

== Westbound bridge (1950) ==
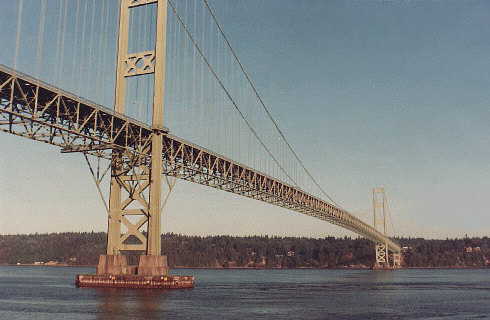
The westbound span in 1988.

After the infamous fall of the original bridge, Professor Farquharson was commissioned again to test new designs for the bridge at the University of Washington, the home of these models. Tests ensured the new design would have a different outcome in high wind conditions than the first and construction began on April 12, 1948, following the completion of a financing and insurance plan. A major earthquake struck the construction site on April 13, 1949, but the only damage was to a cable that fell into the water and was recovered; a fire two months later on the west tower damaged equipment and tools but did not cause permanent damage. The 502-foot (153 m) towers were complete in July 1949 and the cables for the new bridge were finished on January 16, 1950. The current westbound bridge was designed and rebuilt with open trusses, stiffening struts and openings in the roadway to let wind through. It opened on October 14, 1950, and is 5,979 feet (1822 m) long—40 feet (12 m) longer than the first bridge. The new bridge cost $18 million to construct. Local residents nicknamed the new bridge Sturdy Gertie, as the oscillations that plagued the previous design had been eliminated. This bridge and its new parallel eastbound bridge are currently the fifth-longest suspension bridges in the United States.

When built, the westbound bridge was the third longest suspension bridge span in the world. Like other modern suspension bridges, the westbound bridge was built with steel plates that feature sharp entry edges rather than the flat plate sides used in the original Tacoma Narrows Bridge (see the suspension bridge article for an example).

The bridge was designed to handle 60,000 vehicles a day. It carried both westbound and eastbound traffic until the eastbound bridge opened on July 15, 2007. During the Hanukkah Eve windstorm of 2006, the bridge was closed for the first time in its operating existence due to heavy winds but reopened approximately 6 hours later.

== Eastbound bridge (2007) ==
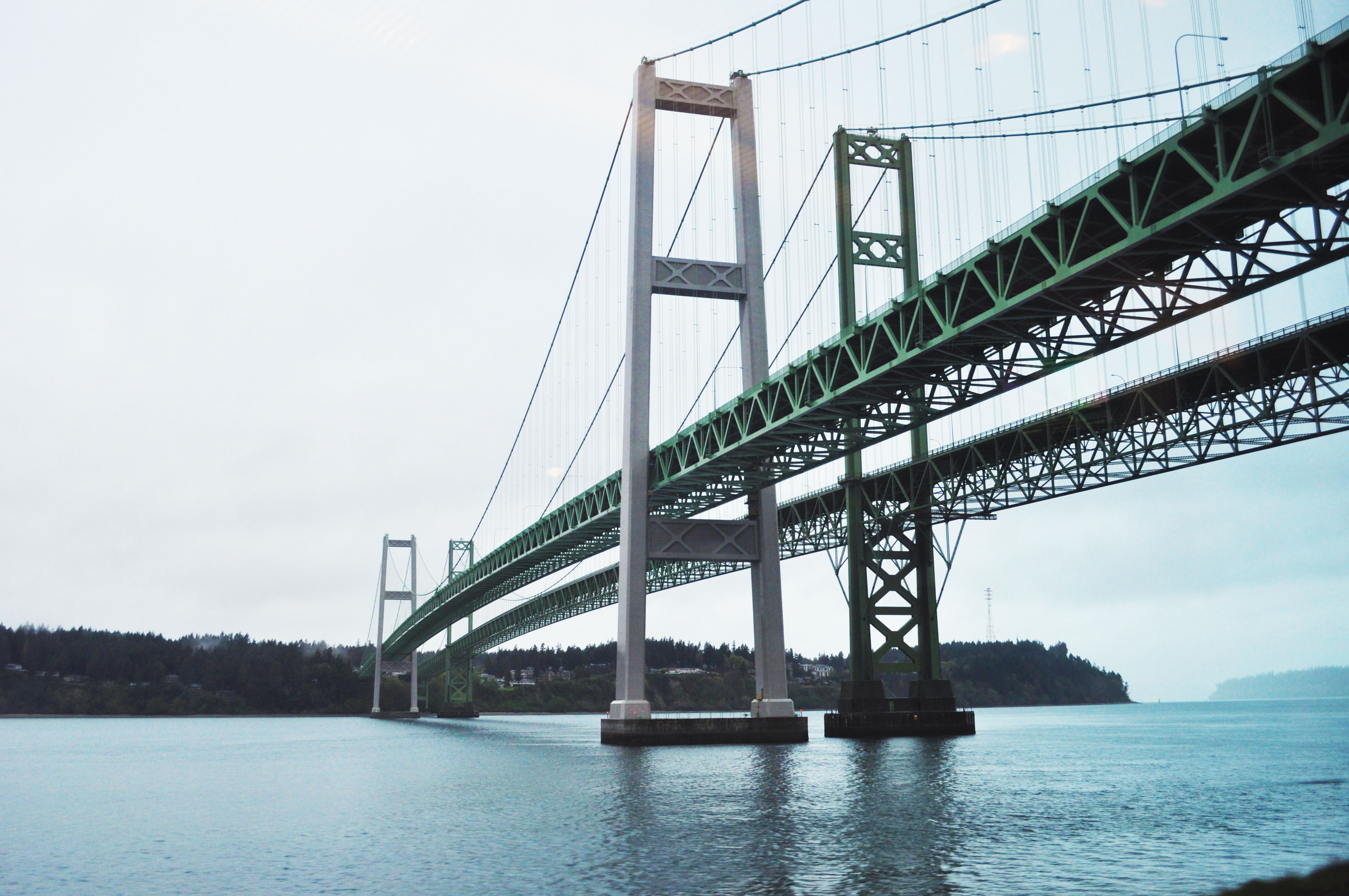
The eastbound span in 2013.

In 1998, voters in several Washington counties approved an advisory measure to create a second Narrows span. Construction of the new span, which carries eastbound traffic parallel to the current bridge, began on October 4, 2002, and was completed in July 2007. The Washington State Department of Transportation (WSDOT) signed a design-and-construction agreement with Bechtel and Kiewit Pacific Co., who then engaged in a joint venture to construct eastbound. It was estimated by WSDOT that the project would cost $849 million to complete, but ultimately finished under budget at $786 million due to not using the funds allocated to emergency scenarios.

On July 15, 2007, the eastbound section opened to a ceremonial 5K run across the newly constructed bridge. About 10,000 people participated in the event. After the run finished, a ceremonial ribbon cutting event took place on eastbound. WSDOT estimated 40,000 people would be in attendance for the opening, but 60,000 ultimately attended. A select few Washington State government officials partook in the ribbon cutting, such as Washington State Treasurer Michael Murphy, State Representative Pat Lantz, Chief of the Washington State Patrol John Batiste, and State Speaker of the House Frank Chopp. The bridge was dedicated in honor of State Representative Ruth Fisher and State Senator Robert "Bob" Oke, a South Kitsap resident, one of the main proponents of building the second span across Puget Sound between the Kitsap Peninsula and Tacoma.

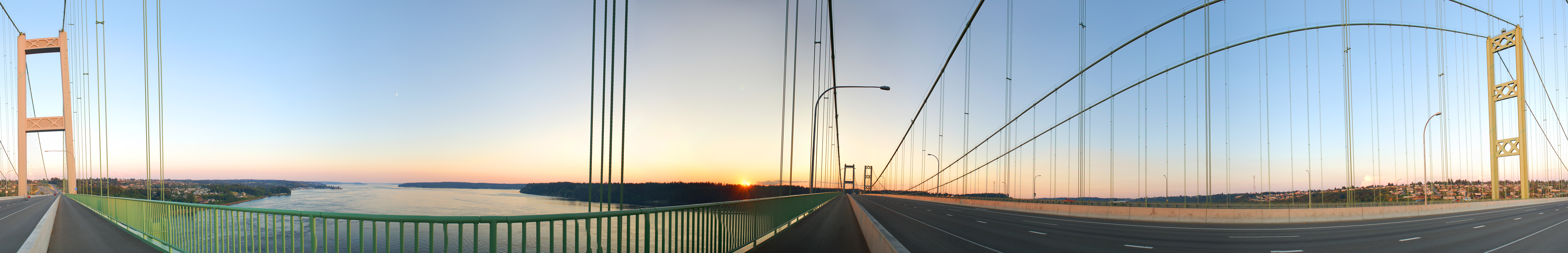
~360° panorama from the deck of the new Tacoma Narrows Bridge at sunset.

The eastbound bridge has an overall length of 5,400 feet (1,646 m), and a main span of 2,799 feet (853 m), making it the fifth largest suspension bridge in the United States. In comparison, the Golden Gate bridge in San Francisco has a total length of 7,782 feet (2,372 m) m or 1.7 miles.

WSDOT collects a toll before entering the eastbound span. Tolls currently are $4.50 for "Good to Go" account holders with in-vehicle transponders, $5.50 for cash/credit card customers, and $6.50 for those who choose Pay-By-Mail. The existing span had been free of tolls since 1965. The new bridge was the first facility to use the new Good To Go electronic toll collection system. Tolls on the bridge are expected to pay off the loans and deferred sales tax by 2033.

== See also ==
- List of longest suspension bridge spans
- List of bridge failures

== Gallery ==
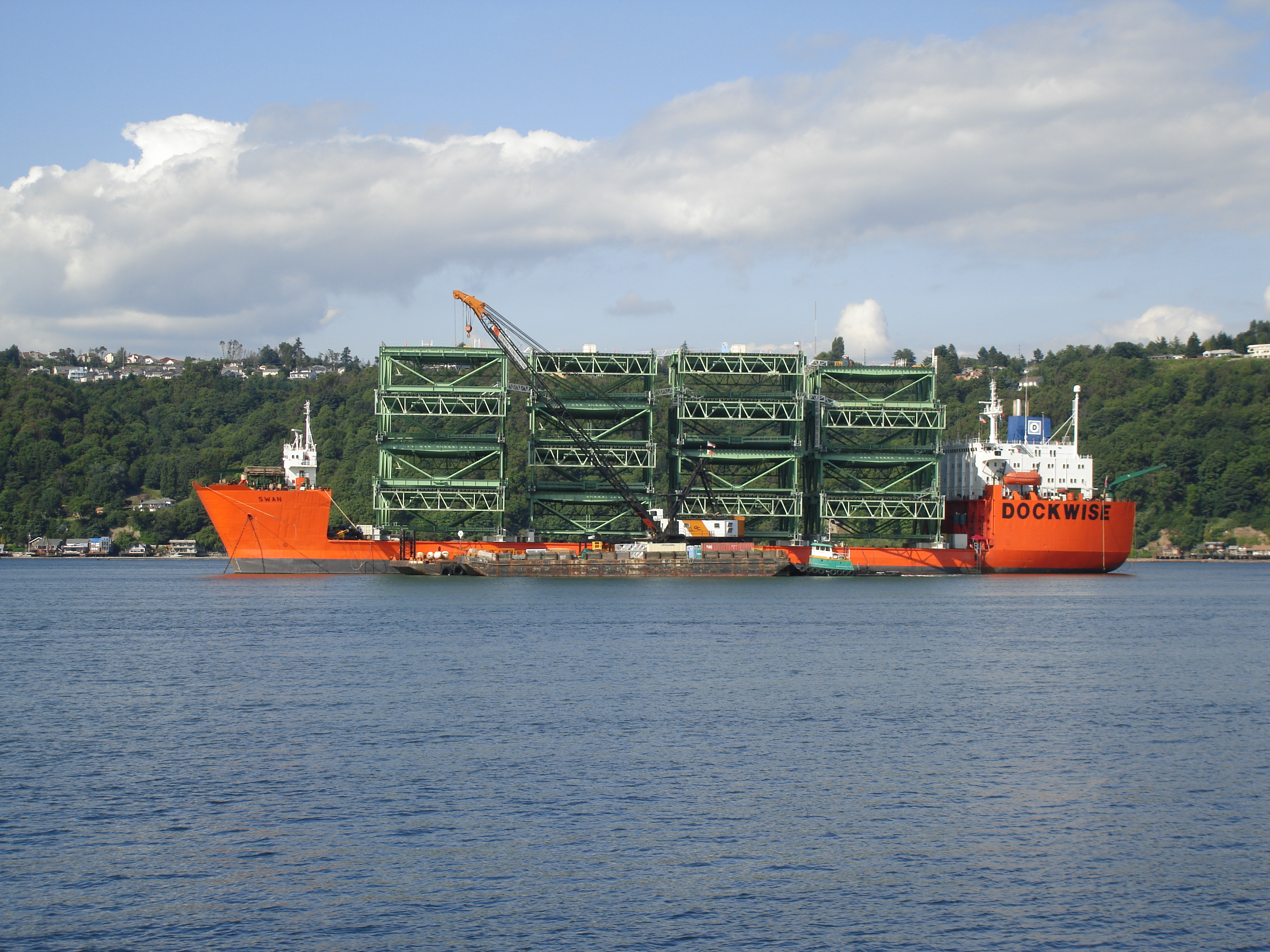
New bridge sections used in construction of the new span.

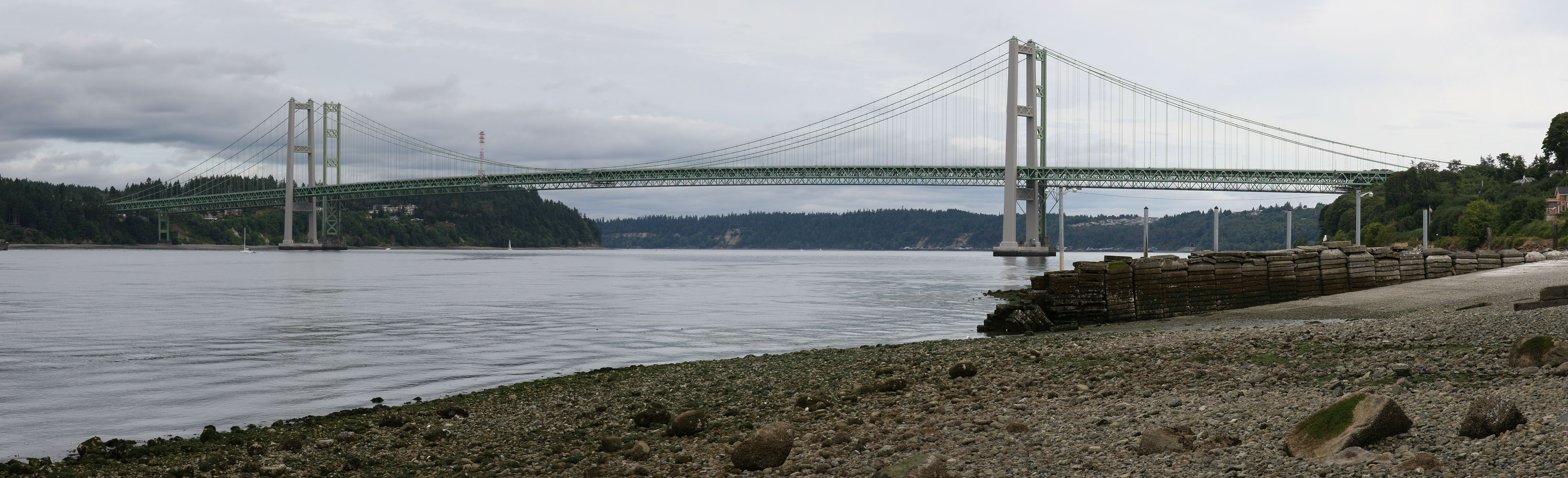
A panorama of Tacoma Narrows Bridge in 2007. This picture was taken at Titlow Hidden Beach.

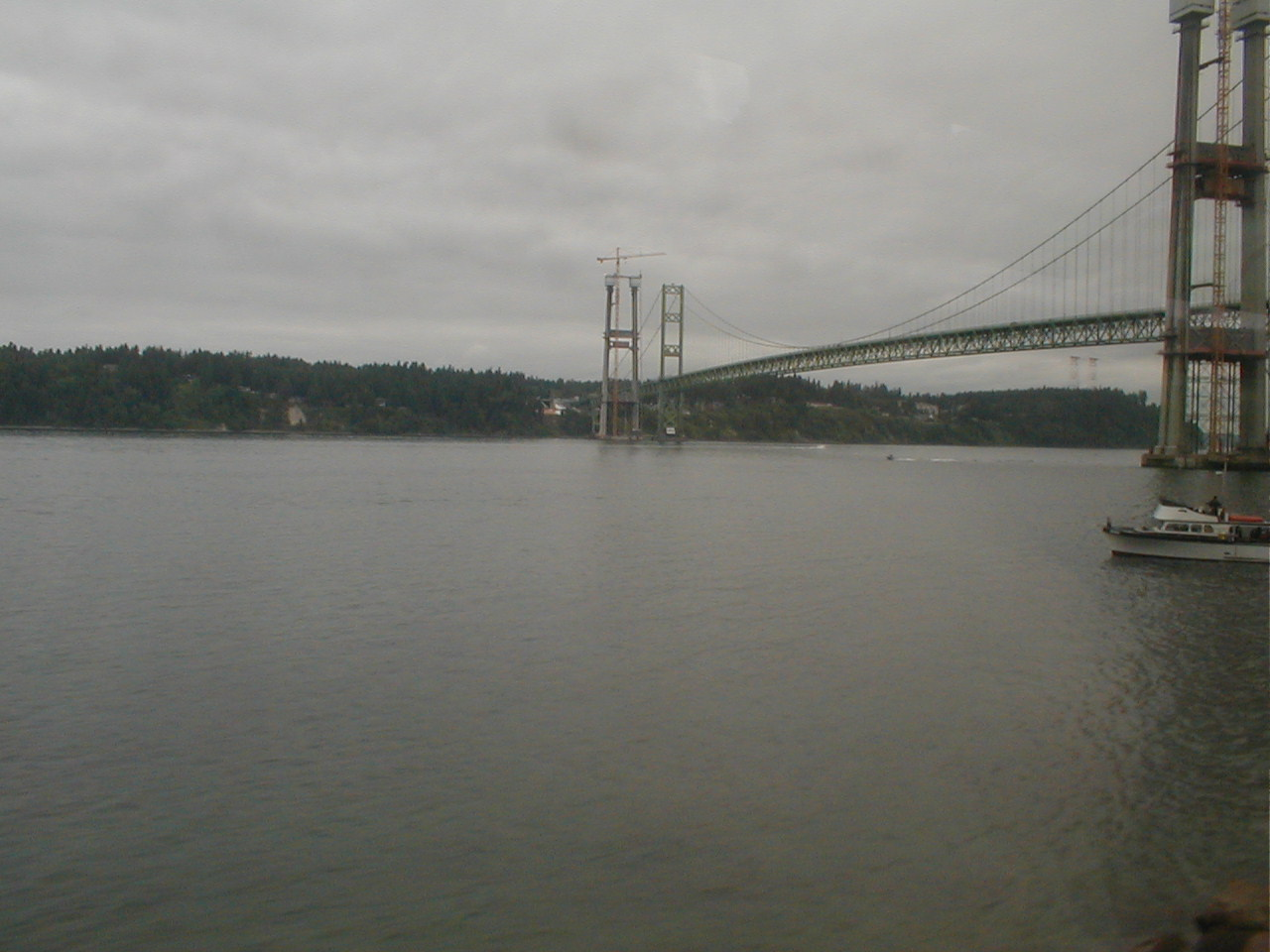
The towers during construction of the new eastbound span, May 2005

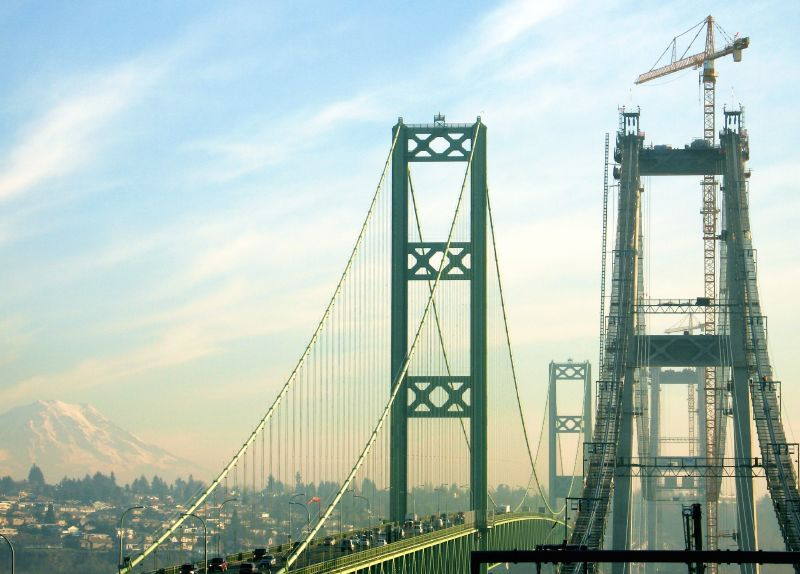
Tacoma Narrows Bridge, during the construction of the eastbound span, as seen from the Kitsap Peninsula in December 2005, with Tacoma and Mount Rainier visible in the background.

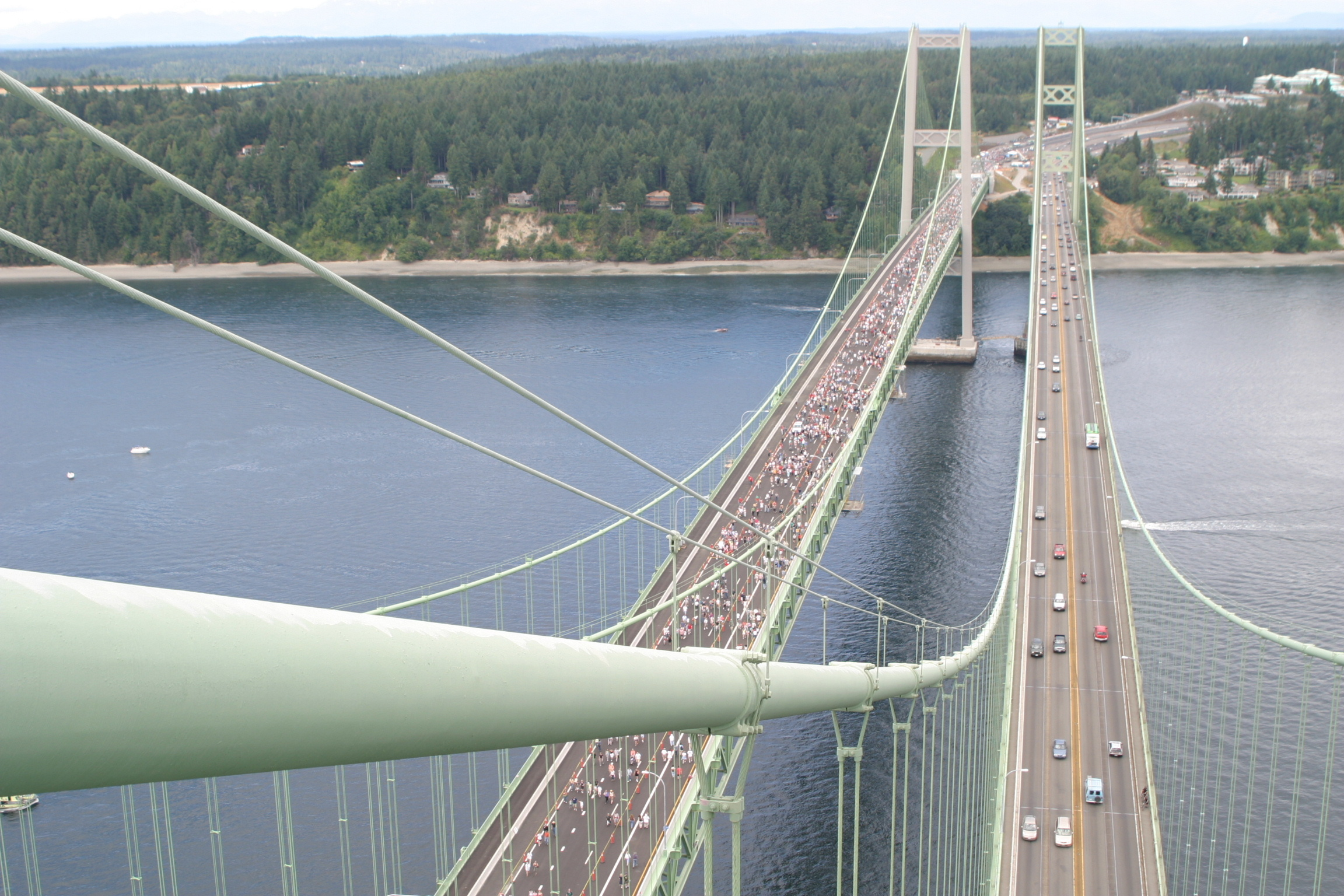
Both bridges during the 2007 bridge's grand opening ceremony, as seen from the top of the westbound bridge.

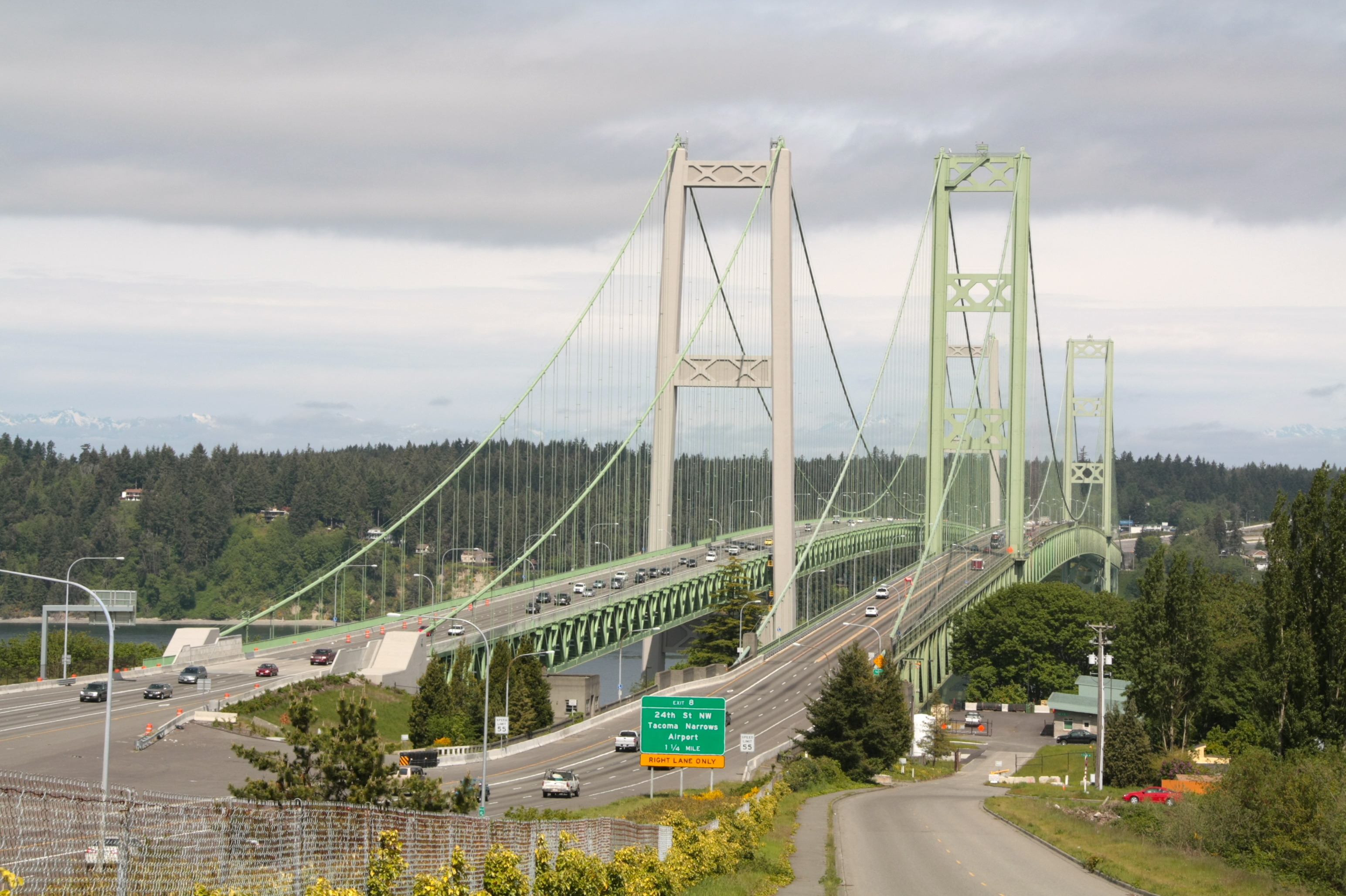
The twin-span bridges seen from the Tacoma side in 2009.

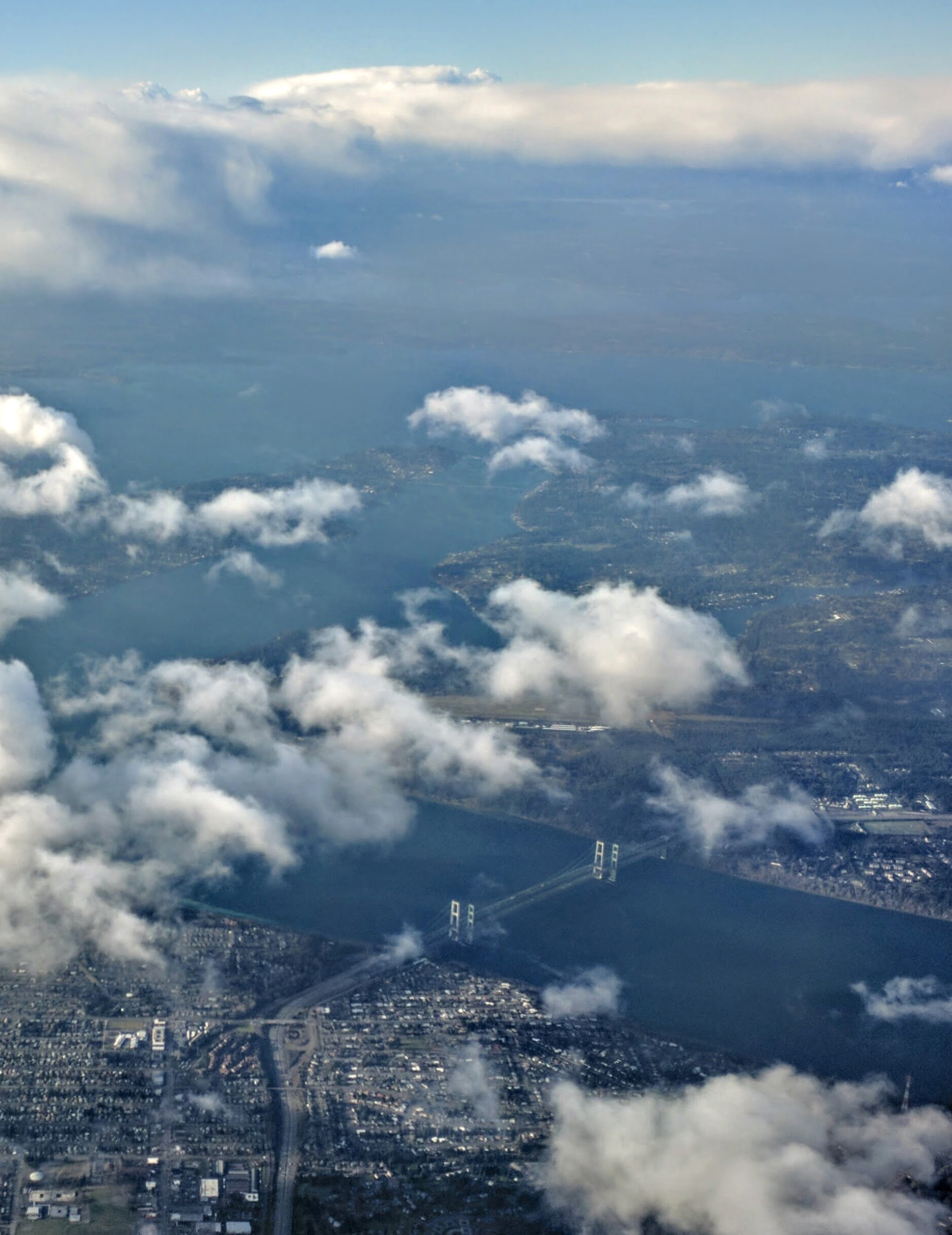
Aerial view, 2016

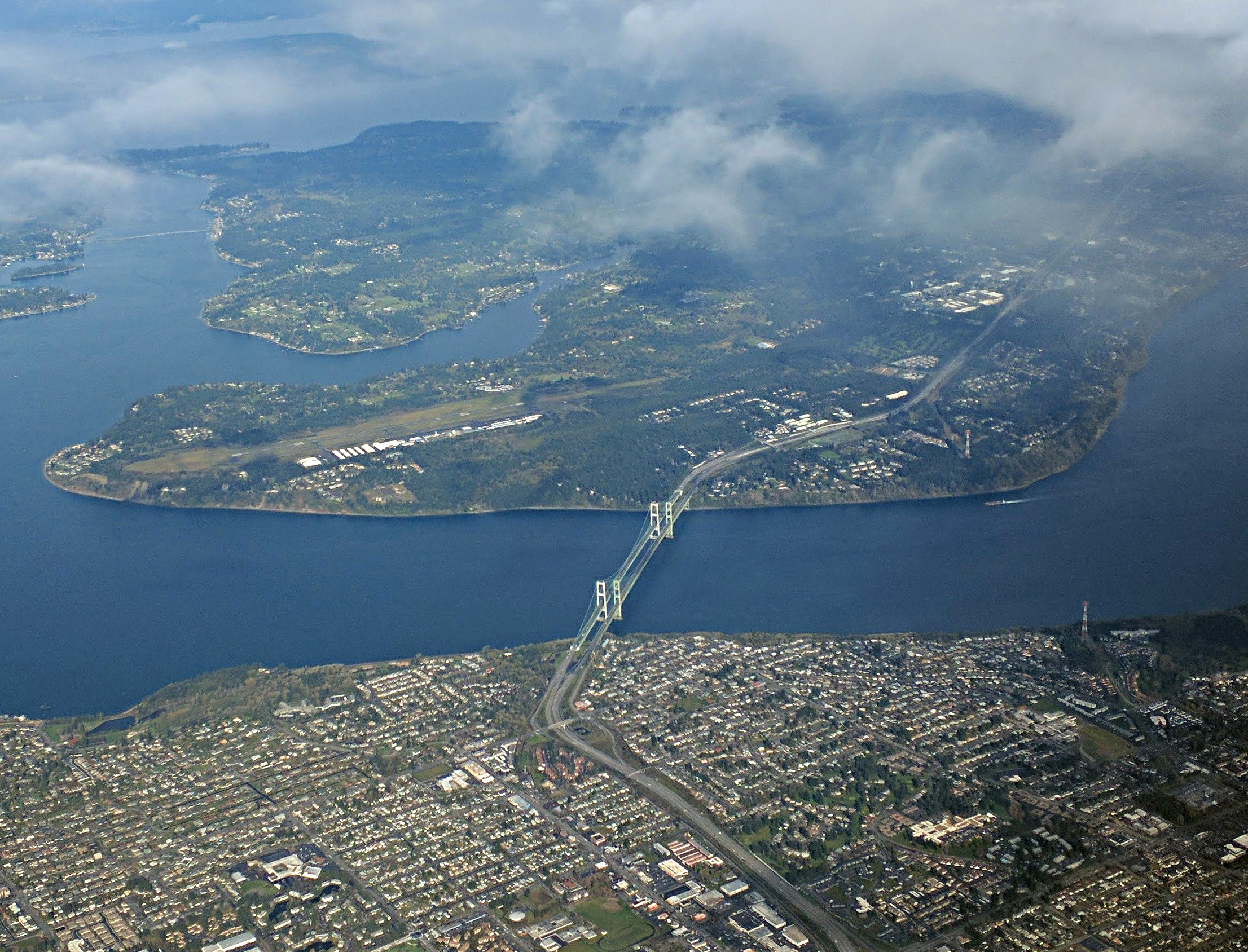
Aerial view, 2017

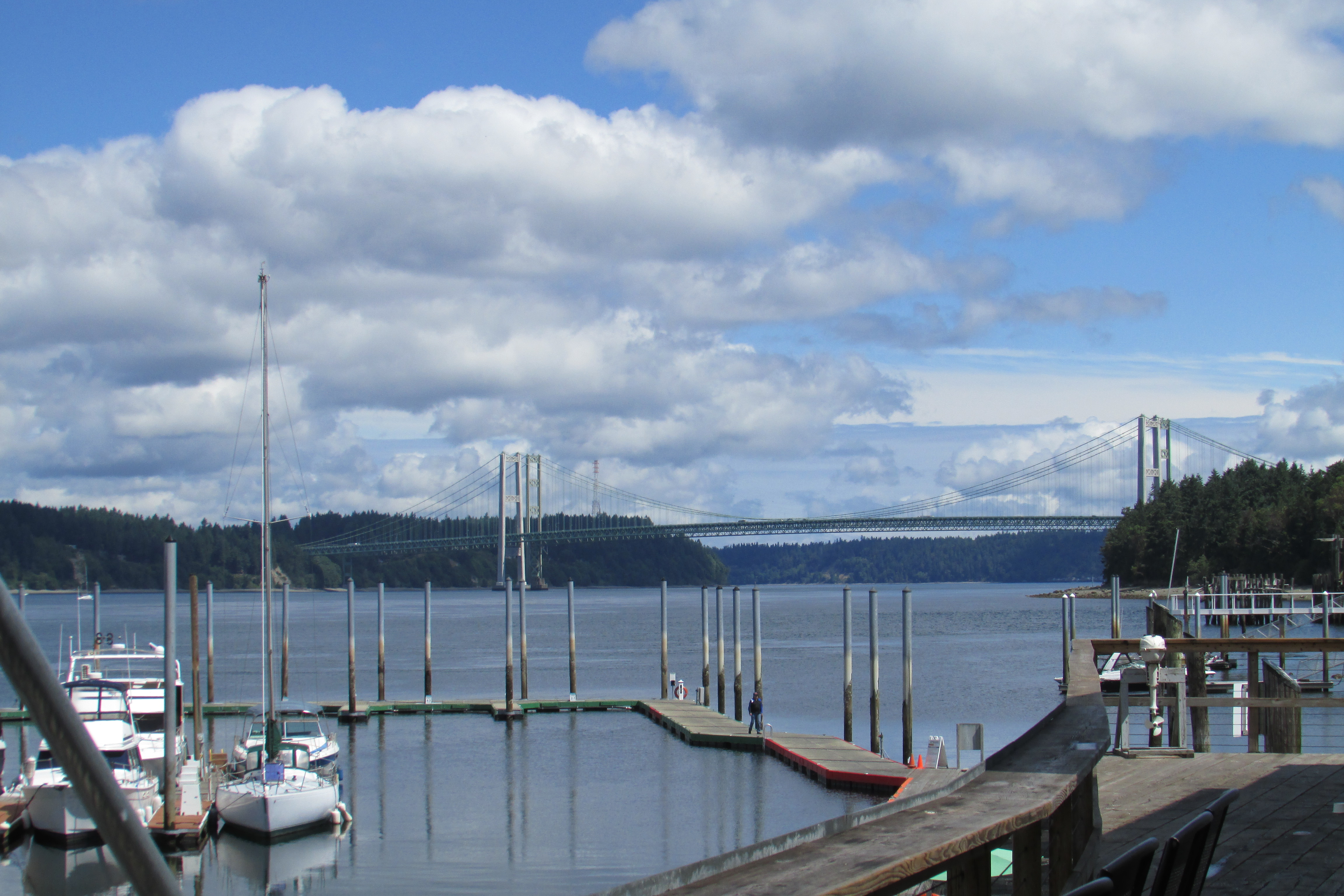
The twin-span complex seen from the boat dock near the Tacoma/University Place city border; 2023
