= Edmund Sylvester =

American pioneer settler

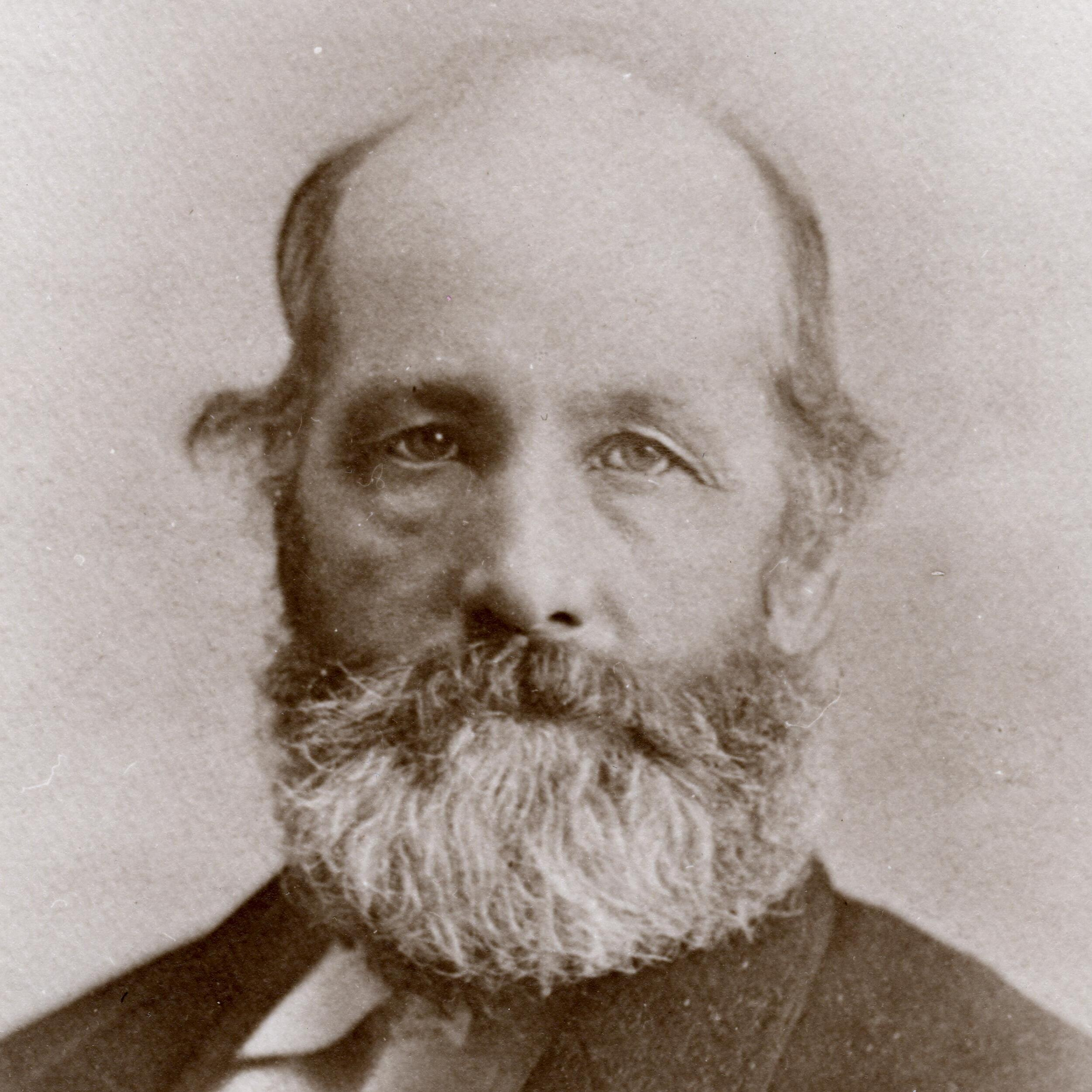
- Sylvester c. 1870 – c. 1886
- Born: March 2, 1821; Deer Isle, Maine
- Died: September 20, 1887 (aged 66); Seattle, Washington
- Burial place: Masonic Memorial Park; Tumwater, Washington
- Occupation: Pioneer
- Known for: Founder of Olympia
- Spouse: Clara E. Pottle (married 1854)
- Children: May

Edmund Sylvester (March 2, 1821 – September 20, 1887) was an emigrant settler in the Oregon and Washington Territories and founder of Olympia, the state capitol of Washington.

== Early life ==
Edmund (or Edmond) Sylvester was born in Deer Isle, Maine on March 2, 1821. His family was Presbyterian and were a long line of fisherman. Edmund loved the sea, but did not love working on it, and therefore pursued farming instead.

== Oregon Territory ==
He traveled to Oregon Territory via Cape Horn in 1843. He came to the area with a group of men, Charles Eaton, A. M. Poe, Daniel T. Kinsey, A. B. Rabbeson and his partner, Levi Lathrop Smith. All six men traveled north of the Columbia River and each took land claims in October 1846.

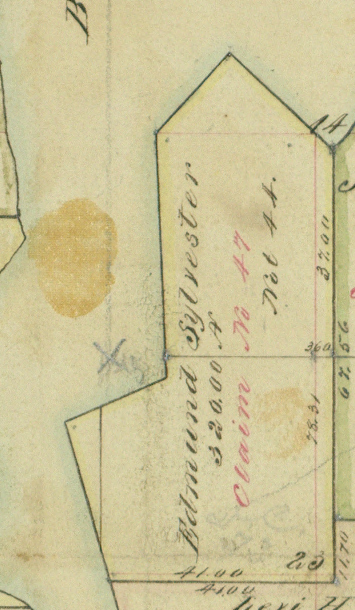
Sylvester's 320 acre land claim survey in 1864

Sylvester took up his 320 acres claim on the edge of Chambers Prairie (which is often called the Dunham Donation Claim) and Smith took up his between Sylvester's claim and Budd Inlet, where the main part of Olympia now resides. The natives called Smith's land Cheetwoot, which means “place of the bear”.

Smith and Sylvester were land claim partners under the partnership clause of the land law of Oregon. They originally named their combined area Smithter or Smithster; it later became Smithfield and eventually became known as Olympia.

In 1848, Levi Smith was the elected delegate to the Oregon Provisional Legislature. In August of that same year, before he could take up his government position, he had a seizure while canoeing to New Market, capsized and drowned. He was the first recorded American pioneer to die in the area Because of the partnership, Smith's land went to Sylvester and Sylvester abandoned his prairie claim for Smith's claim. He also built the first hotel at this time, which was 16 x 24 feet and roughly built of logs.

== Gold rush ==
In 1849, Sylvester traveled to California for the gold rush. He returned to his land claim in 1850, having traveled upon the Orbit. Sylvester had come back from San Francisco with only gold dust, which he used to buy into the Orbit partnership, it being the first vessel owned by Washington Territory residents. The Orbit was a ship that he and other Olympia pioneers bought and used for transporting wares from San Francisco to Puget Sound, which they sold in their shops.

He donated land for the first school, masonic temple, the capital grounds, and Sylvester Park; he sold some of his land for the first shops in Olympia. He built his own store, which sold tobacco, confectionary and fruit; and often preferred to play chess with customers than have them shop.

== Later life ==
In June 1852, when Thurston County became an official county, Sylvester was elected coroner.

There are two different stories as to how his wife, Clara Pottle (1832-1917), came to Washington Territory. The first being, that four years after coming to the territory, he sent for his younger brother, Crowell H. and had Crowell bring Clara Pottle with him. The other possibility, is in 1854 Sylvester returned to Maine, where he married Clara Pottle and then brought her back to the quickly growing Olympia, Washington on October 15.

Crowell H. Sylvester took a land claim in the South Bay area, where he resided until his brother's death in the 1880s, at which point he took on his farm until Crowell's death in the mid 1900s.

Edmond and Clara had one child; a daughter named May, who later became a practicing attorney in Seattle.

Clara was very involved in the women's vote and other women oriented political movements. She would live in Olympia from 1854 until after her husband's death, but eventually moved to San Diego, where she died in 1917.

The Sylvester family was known for their political involvement in women's rights, their generosity and being very social. They were involved in all of the big events of the first decades of Olympia, however they led very few of these events.

=== Sylvester's Mansion ===
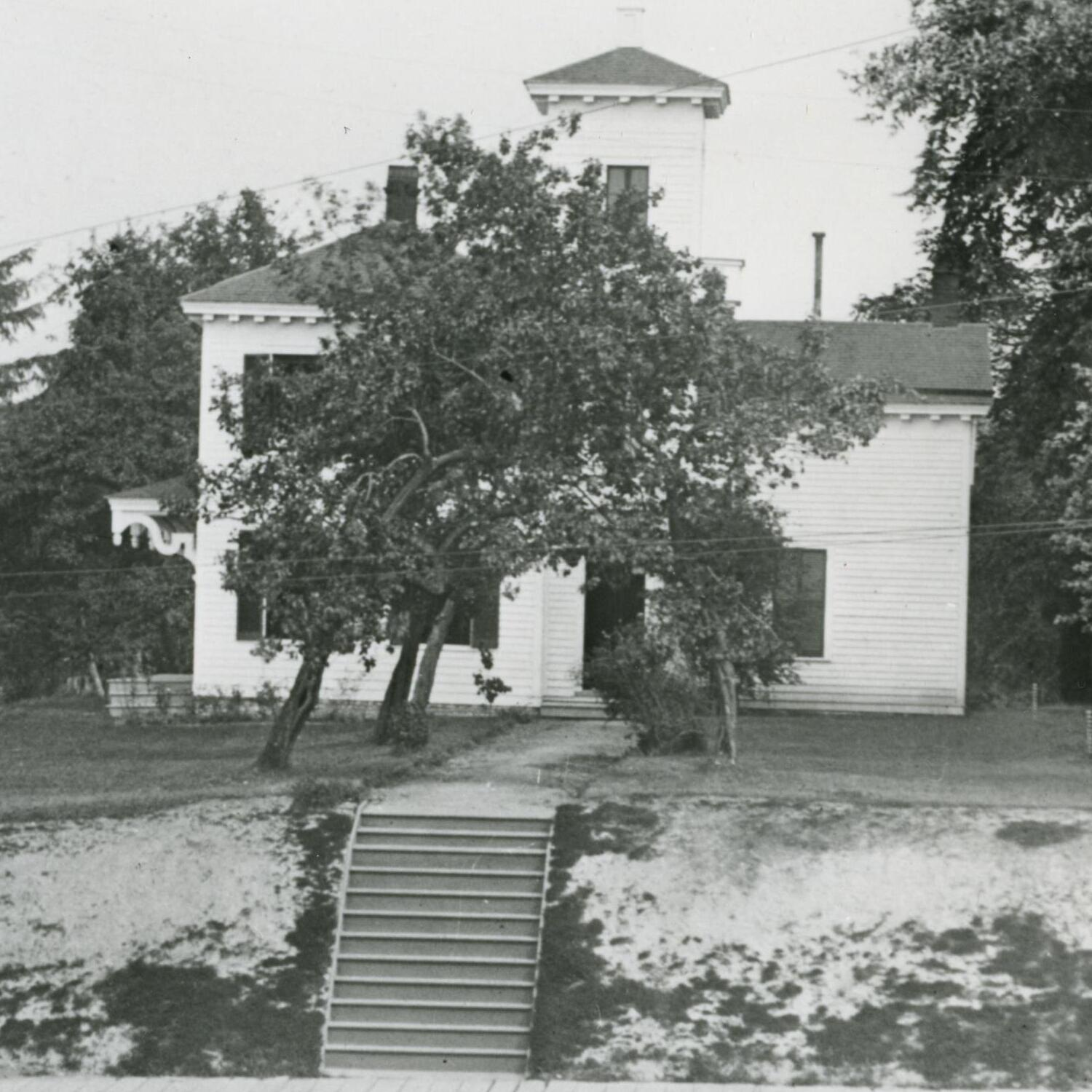
Home of Edmund and his wife Clara, c. 1880 – c. 1911

Sylvester's Mansion was built by Konrad Schneider in 1856–57 and was located between 7th and 8th Avenues. It remained an icon in Olympia until the mid-20th century, when it was moved and attempts to restore it began. The attempts at restoration were never completed, and in 1961, arsonists burned it down.

Sylvester's Window is a painting series, created by educator Lynn Erickson and artist Robert Chamberlain, and is permanently housed in the Olympia Timberland Library; it shows the changing landscape of Olympia from the point of view of the highest window in Sylvester's Mansion.

== Death ==
Edmund Sylvester died in Seattle, on September 20, 1887; his death caused great mourning by their friends and fellow pioneers. He had been married for 33 years. From the first day that Sylvester and Smith came into the Puget Sound area until his death, he believed that Olympia would become an important city with great economic growth; he died without seeing how mighty it would be and often said, that he had come to the area too soon.

== See also ==
- History of Olympia, Washington
