= History of Olympia, Washington =

The history of Olympia, Washington includes long-term habitation by Native Americans, charting by a famous English explorer, settlement of the town in the 1840s, the controversial siting of a state college in the 1960s and the ongoing development of arts and culture from a variety of influences.

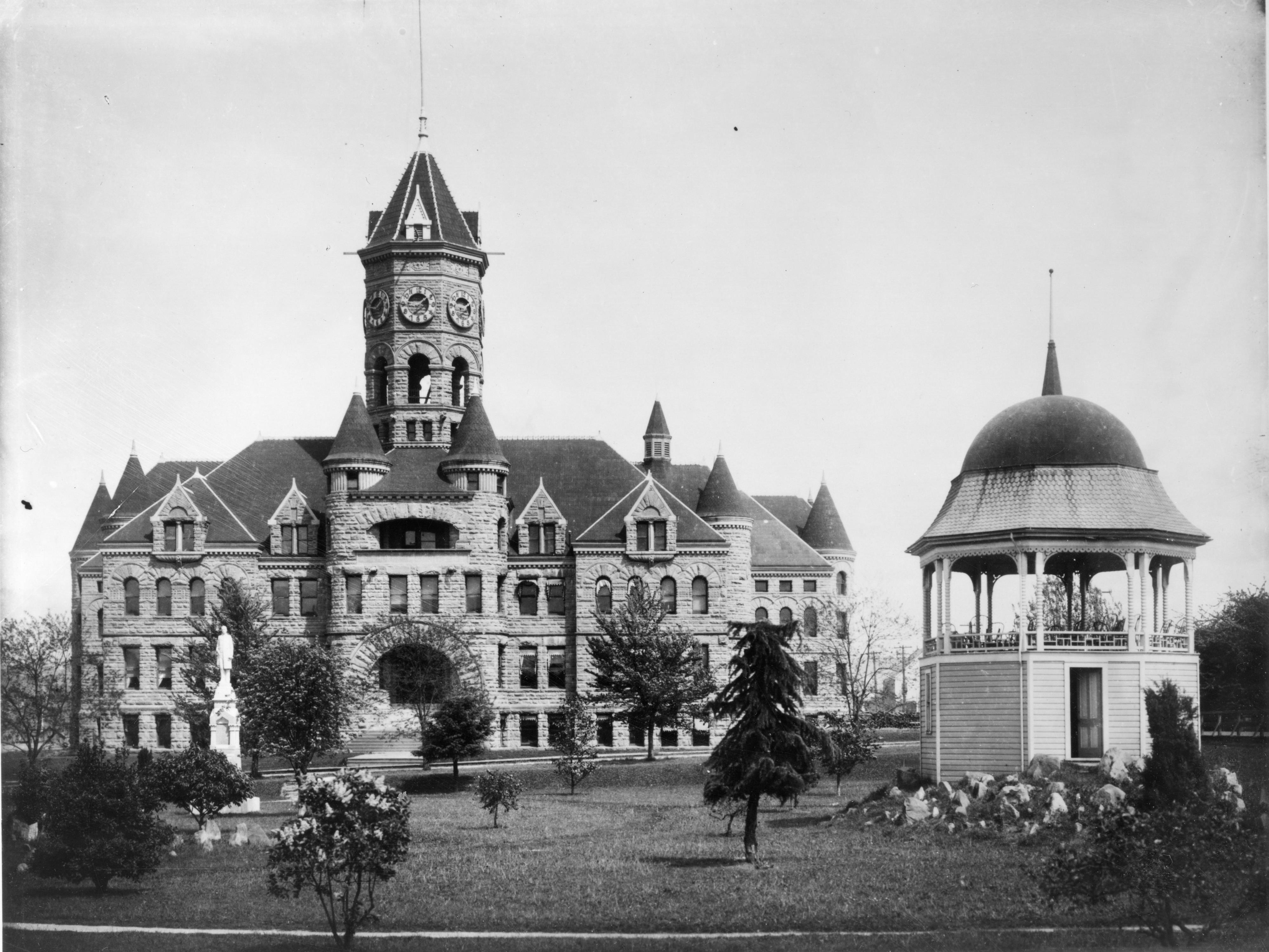
Old Capitol Building and Sylvester Park, c. 1904 – c. 1918

== Pre-European history ==
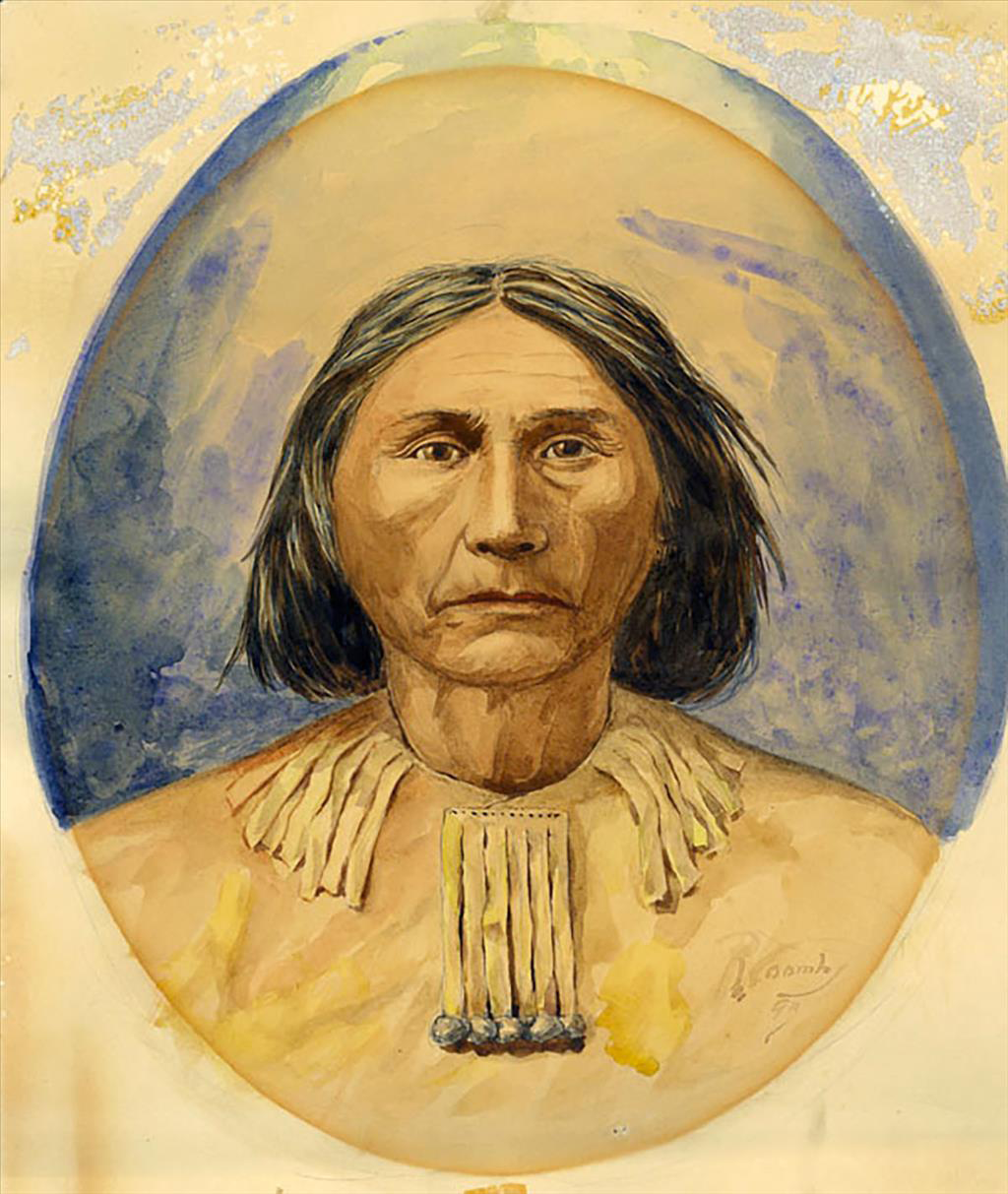
Chief Leschi of the Nisqually.

Olympia is situated at the extreme southern tip of Puget Sound on Budd Inlet. The site of Olympia was home to Lushootseed-speaking peoples for thousands of years. The abundant shellfish in the tideflats and the many salmon-spawning streams entering Puget Sound at this point made it a productive food-gathering area. Many tribes shared access to these resources, including Squaxin, Nisqually, Puyallup, Chehalis, Suquamish, and Duwamish.

According to early settlers' accounts, Nisqually natives called the present site of Olympia Cheet-Woot (a.k.a. Schictwoot), meaning "the place of the bear", named either for a Budd Inlet peninsula which at high tide would resemble the silhouette of a bear, or after actual bears which would forage the area for wild roots.

== European contact ==
The first recorded visit by Europeans was in 1792 when Peter Puget and a crew from the British Vancouver Expedition charted the site. In 1833, the Hudson's Bay Company established Fort Nisqually, a trading post at Sequalitchew Creek near present-day DuPont, Washington. As the fur trade declined, the HBC diversified, forming a subsidiary called Pugets Sound Agricultural Company and converted former trade posts including Fort Nisqually into working farms. The U.S. Exploring Expedition under Lt. Charles Wilkes explored the Puget Sound region in 1841. They camped near Fort Nisqually while they charted the area and named Budd Inlet after expedition member Thomas A. Budd.

== Settlement (pre-1850) ==
The first known European to reside at the future site of Olympia was Thomas K Otchin, an English Hudson Bay Company employee who took up a claim in 1841 but abandoned it by 1842.

American settlers came to the area in the 1840s, drawn by the water-power potential of Tumwater Falls and established nearby "Newmarket," now known as Tumwater, the first American settlement on Puget Sound. The site was the northern end of the "Cowlitz Portage," the overland trail between the Cowlitz River and Puget Sound. In a time when water travel was the easiest form of transportation, Olympia's location on the north end of the main route through the area made it a crossroads for regional trade.

In 1846, Edmund Sylvester and Levi Lathrop Smith jointly claimed the land that now comprises downtown Olympia. Smith built his cabin and enclosed two acres for a garden and livestock near the current intersection of Capitol Way and Olympia Avenue.

In 1848, Smith was elected to the Oregon Provisional Legislature. In the same year, while canoeing to Tumwater, he had a seizure and died by drowning. His untimely death in 1848 left his partner and friend, Sylvester the sole owner of the land on which he platted the future townsite. Early names for the settlement included "Smithfield" and "Smithter" in honor of Levi Smith.

At the request of the Hudson's Bay Company, French Catholic missionaries established Mission St. Joseph of Newmarket and school in 1848 at Priest Point near the future townsite for the conversion of natives to Catholicism.

== 1850–1859 ==
In 1850, the town settled on the name Olympia, at the suggestion of local resident Isaac N. Ebey, due to its view of the Olympic Mountains to the northwest. The town was starting to grow: several homes were being built and a general store offered sugar, coffee, molasses, flour, fabrics, clothes, and various trinkets.

In February 1851, Congress established the Customs District of Puget Sound and Olympia became the official customs port of entry, requiring all ships to call at Olympia first. In July of the same year, the first mail service was established by Antonio B. Rabbeson, which operated a weekly service by horseback and canoe.

In 1852, Olympia became the county seat of the newly organized Thurston County which at the time was still part of Oregon Territory.

The first schoolhouse in Olympia was built in 1852, becoming the first public school north of what is now Toledo, Washington, (Note: The Columbian, Olympia, July 16, 1853 reported by Hubert Howe Bancroft in 1890) and predating Seattle's first school by almost 20 years.

On September 11, 1852, the Columbian was published in Olympia, becoming the first newspaper published in the Washington Territory, with the assistance of Thomas J. Dryer.

In about 1853, Ezra Meeker says that Olympia contained about 100 inhabitants; it had 3 stores, a hotel, a livery stable, a saloon, and a weekly newspaper called The Columbian (later renamed Pioneer and Democrat), which was in its 30th publish.

By the early 1850s, American settlers began agitating to separate the area north of the Columbia River from Oregon Territory. The agitation resulted in Congress creating Washington Territory.

Isaac I. Stevens served as its first governor; on November 28, 1853, Stevens proclaimed Olympia as the capital of the new territory.

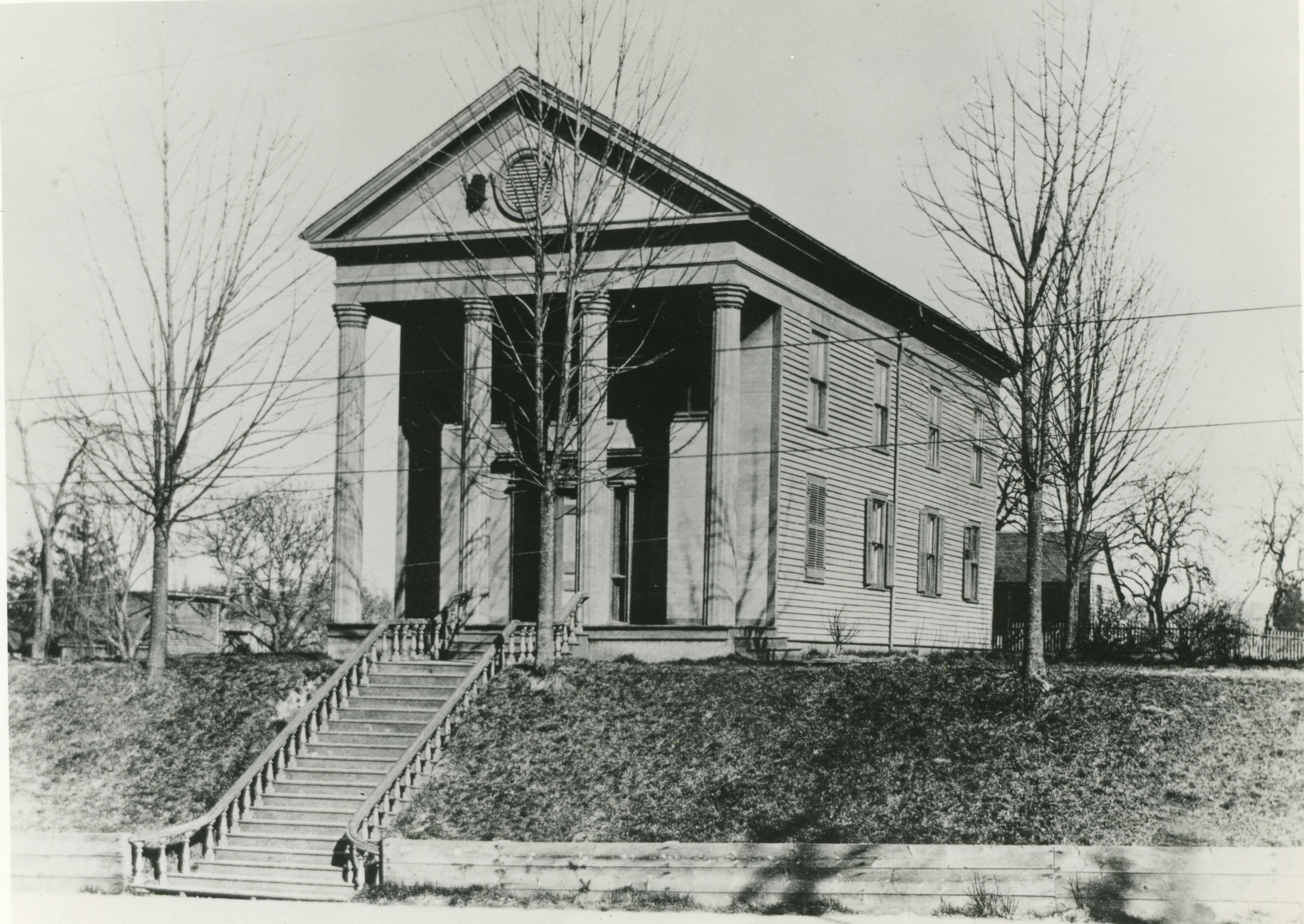
Masonic Temple, built in 1854.

The first Washington Territorial Legislature convened early on February 27, 1854, at the Parker-Coulter Dry Goods store (a.k.a. the Gold Bar Restaurant) on Main Street (now Capital Way) between State Street and Olympia Ave. As the capitol building was still under construction, the second and following sessions met in the Masonic Temple until 1856.

Olympia's Daniel Bigelow represented Thurston County in the first three legislatures. His family home still stands, now known as Bigelow House Museum, Olympia's oldest surviving home.

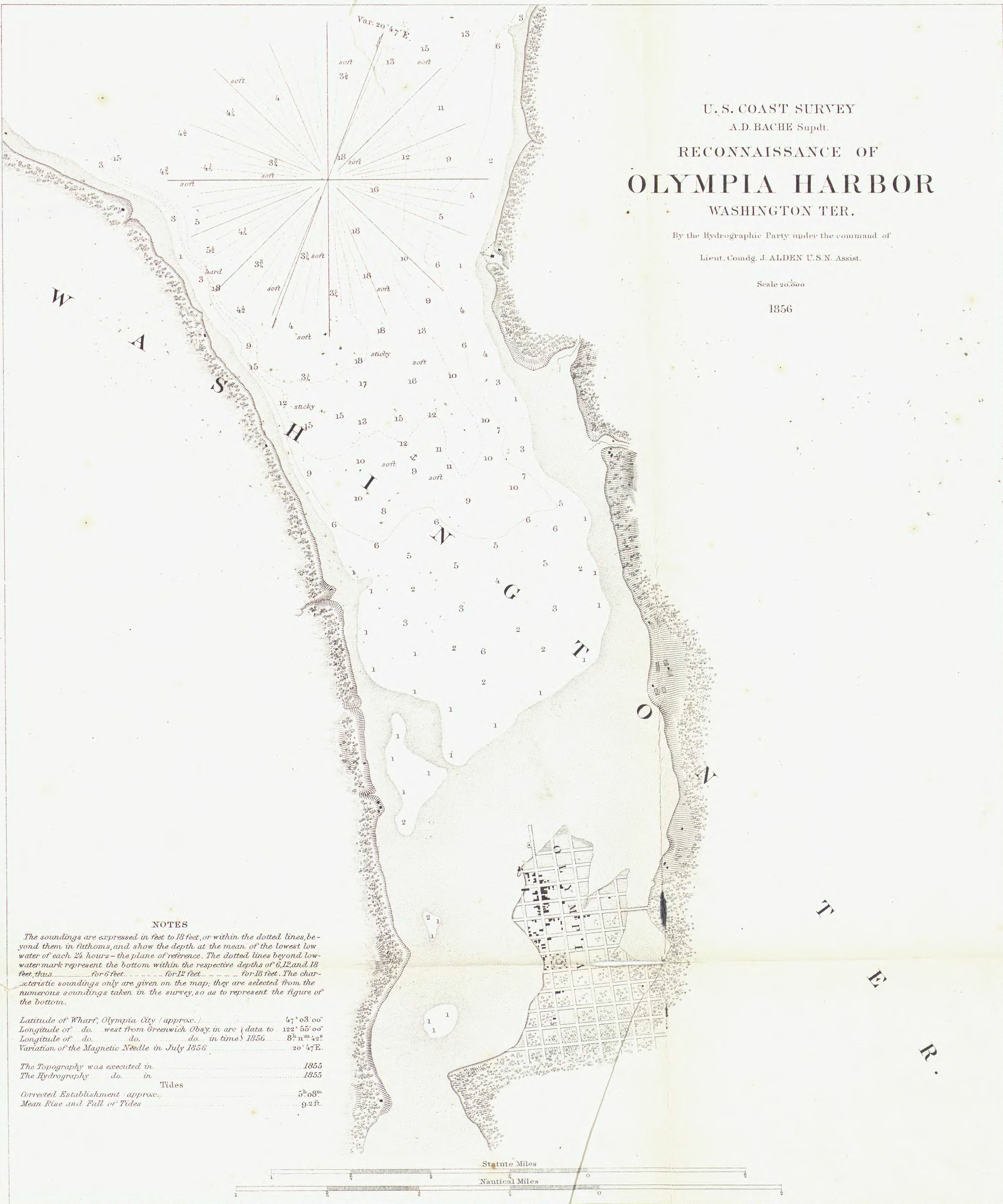
Survey of Olympia Harbor, 1856

In 1855–1856, during the Puget Sound War, Olympia residents took shelter at Sylvester Park, and constructed a 15 feet (4.6 m) high blockade along 4th Avenue (now Legion Way SE), bay-to-bay with a gate at Main Street. A cannon was mounted and nightly armed patrols took place in town. The November 9, 1855 edition of Pioneer and Democrat acknowledged having missed the previous week's issue on account of the hostilities, as staff were constructing fortifications or off fighting.

Olympia was incorporated as a town on January 28, 1859.

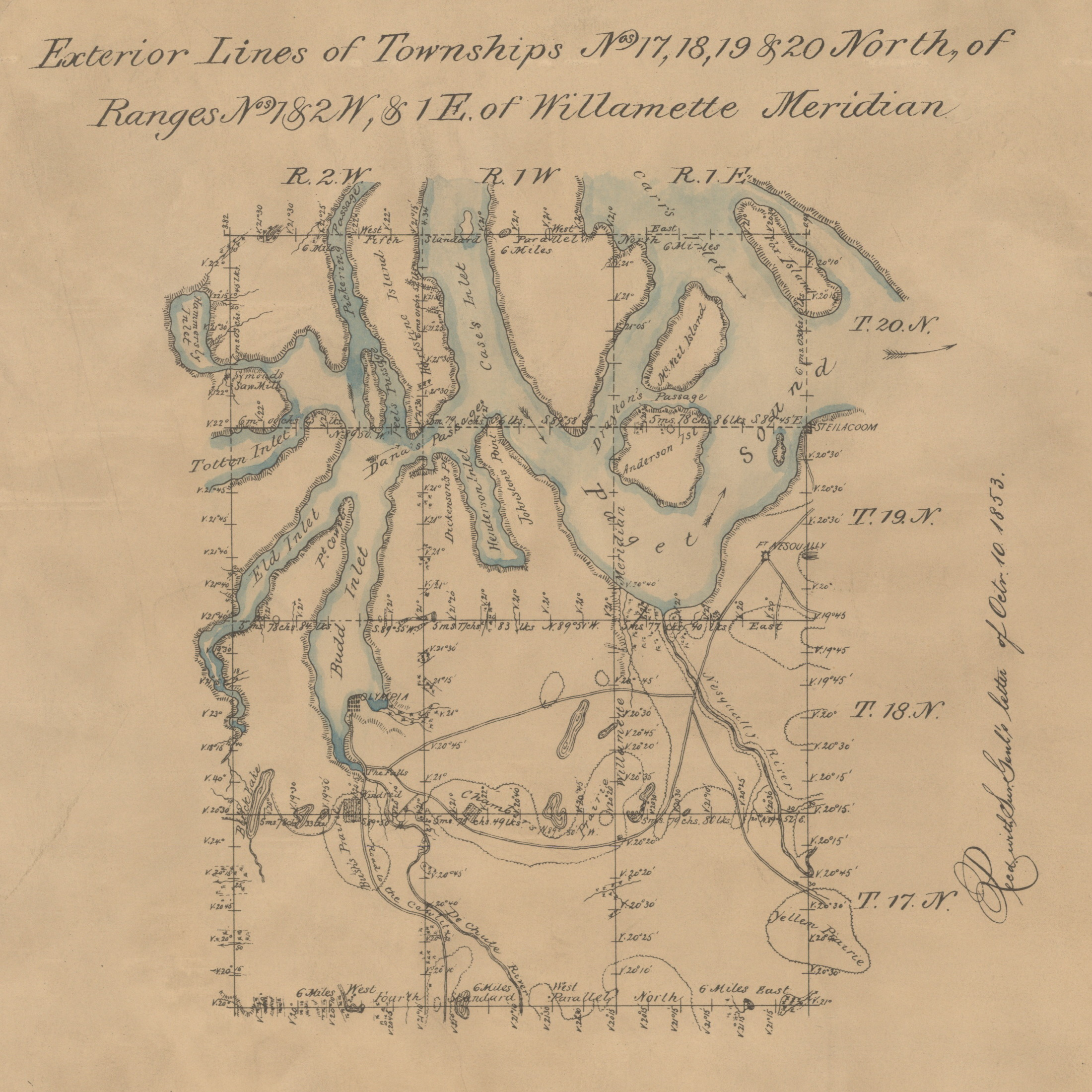
Survey of Olympia and surrounding area, September 9, 1853

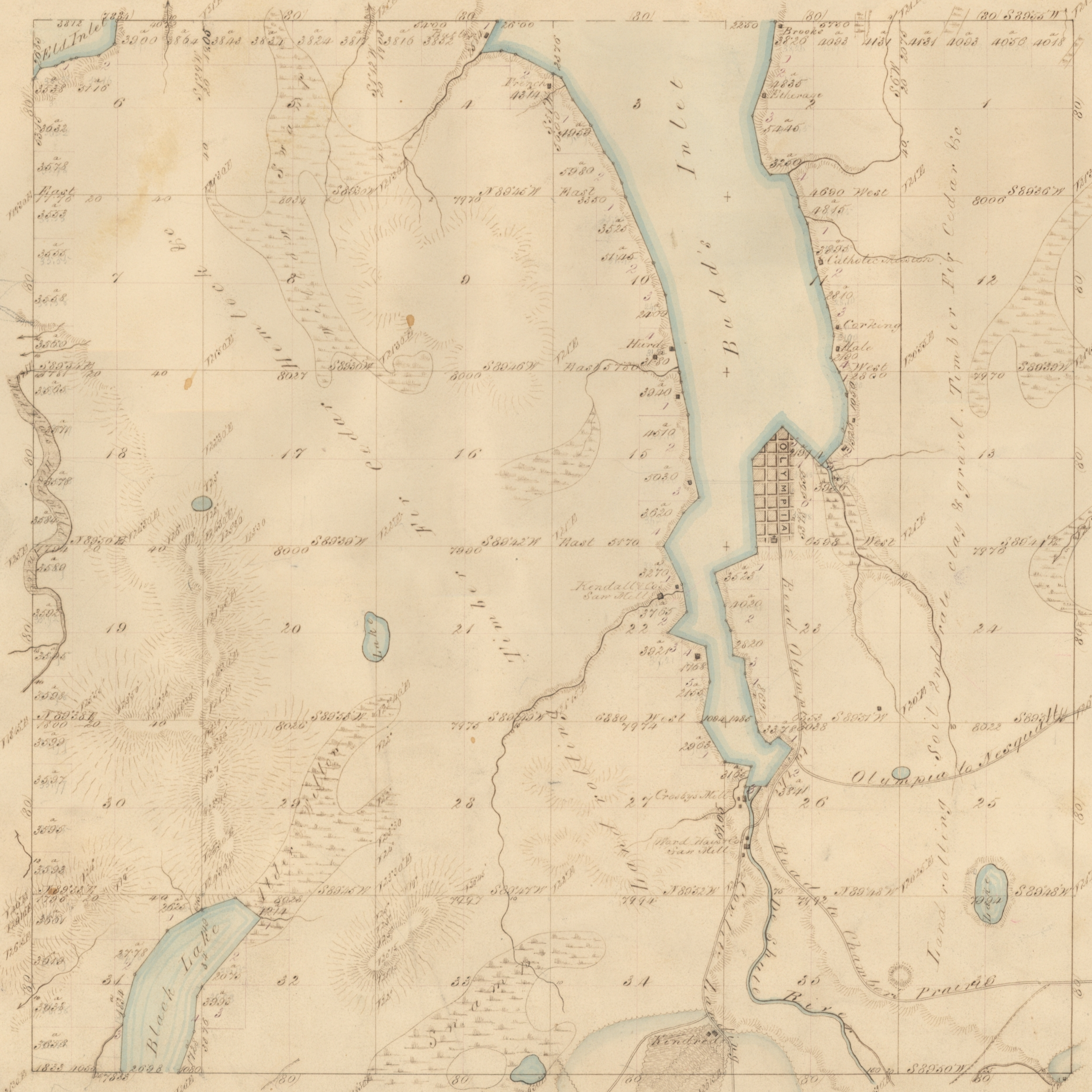
Cadastral survey of Olympia region, February 11, 1854

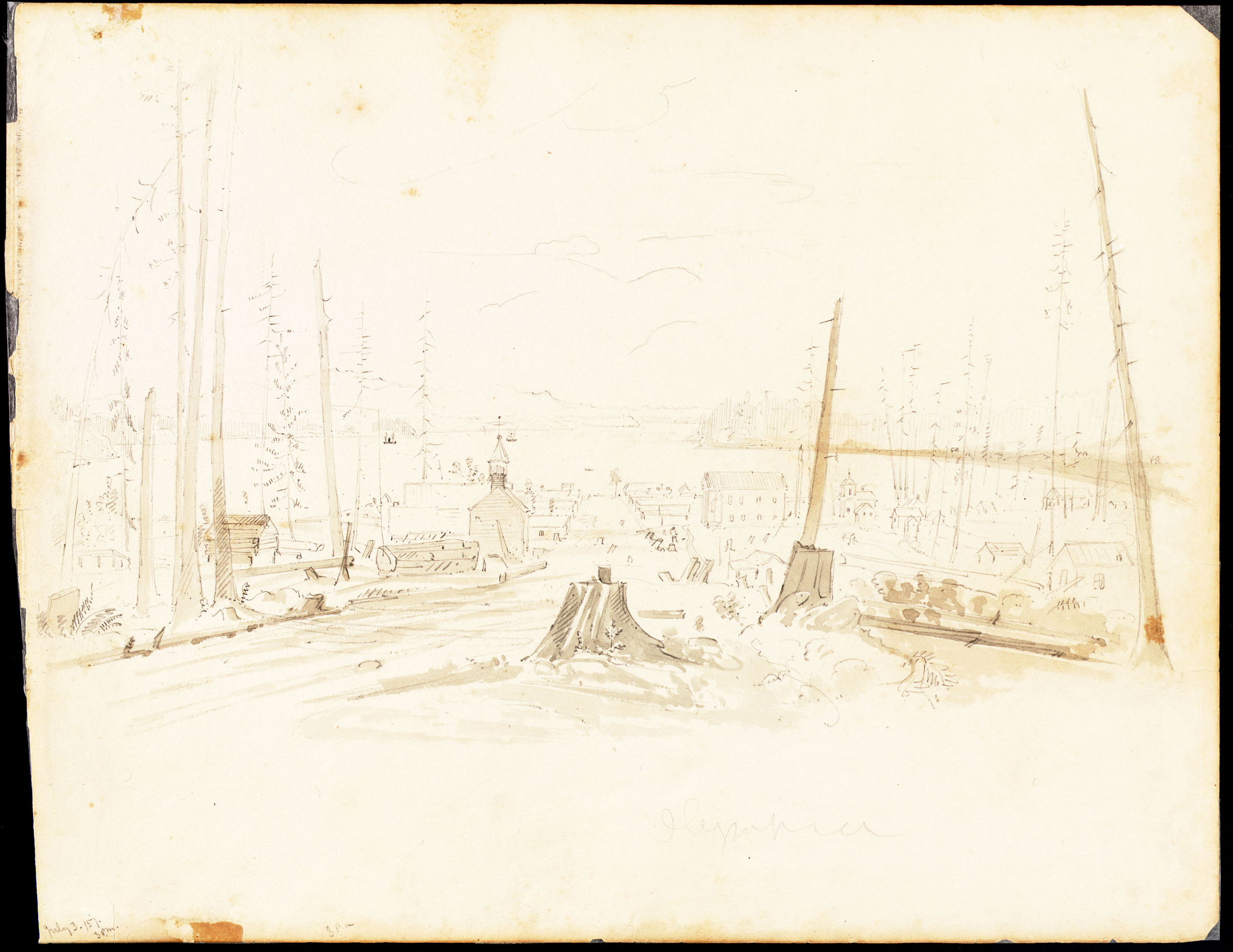
Looking north to Budd Inlet, sketch by James Madison Alden, 1857. The Masonic Temple and the Sylvester's Mansion are seen center-right.

== 1860-1889 ==
=== First telegraph ===
On Sunday, September 4, 1864, telegraph lines from south of the Columbia River reached Olympia and Governor William Pickering sent a message to Abraham Lincoln. The president responded the same day.

To His Excellency, Abraham Lincoln, President of the United States
Washington Territory this day sends her first Telegraphic Dispatch greeting yourself, Washington City, and the whole United States, with our sincere prayers to Almighty God, that his richest blessings, both spiritual and temporal may rest upon and perpetuate the union of our beloved country: that His omnipotent power may bless, protect, and defend the President of the United States, our brave army, our gallant navy, our congress & every Department of our National Government. For & on behalf of Washington Territory

— William Pickering, Gov. Washington Territory,
Telegram, September 4, 1864

=== 1872 earthquake ===
On December 14, 1872, at approximately 9:50 p.m., the Puget Sound region experienced the effects of the 1872 North Cascades earthquake. Shaking continued throughout the night, causing some residents to flee to ships and steamers at the wharves.

=== Northern Pacific Railroad ===
The city grew steadily until 1873, when the Northern Pacific Railroad building a line toward Puget Sound unexpectedly bypassed Olympia, choosing Tacoma as its west coast terminus. Alarmed by the loss of the railroad, Olympia residents set to work building their own rail connection to the main line at Tenino. Citizens formed a private corporation to raise money and build a connection.

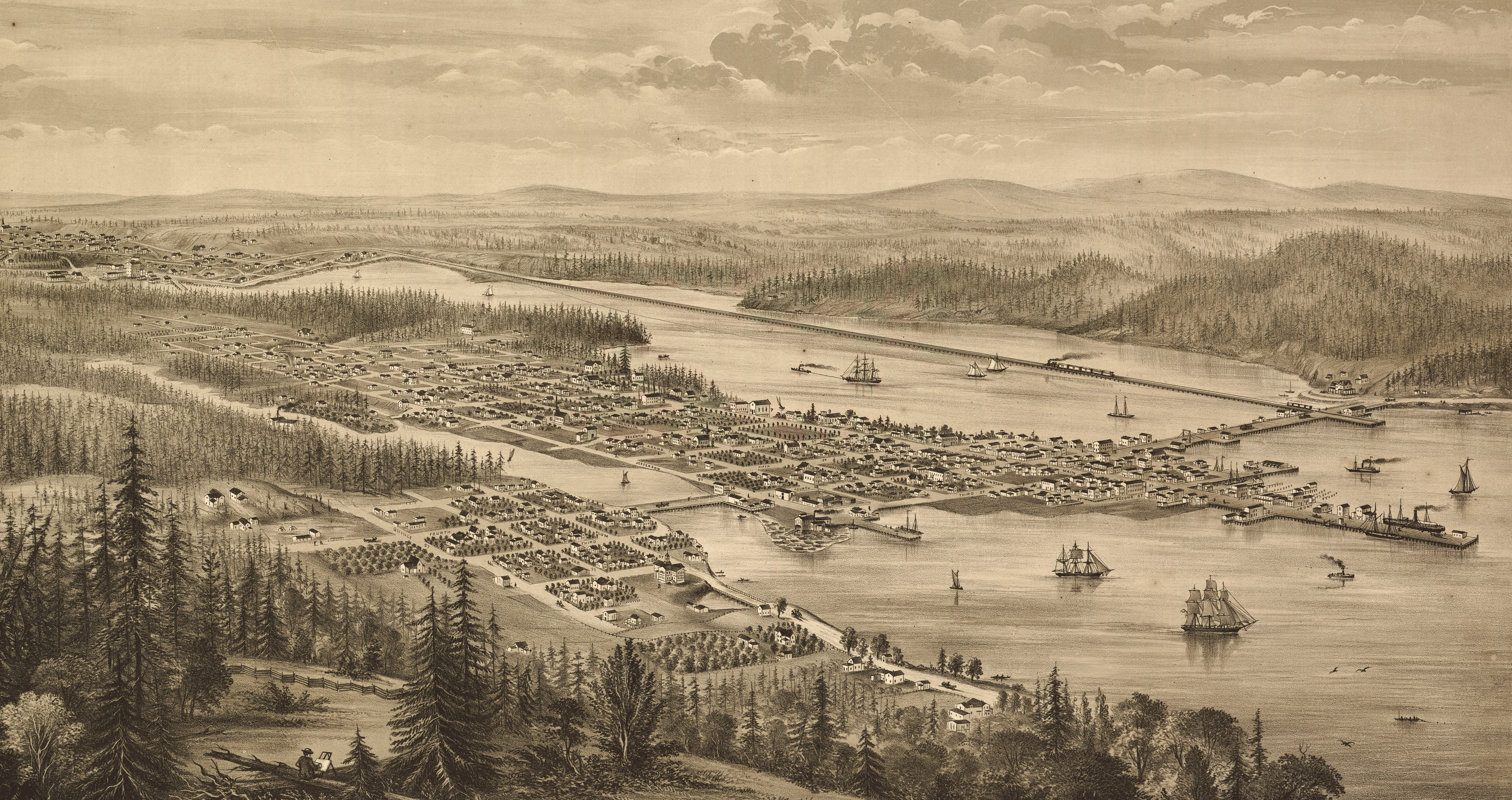
Olympia and Tumwater, c. 1879

One of the early contributors was black businesswoman, Rebecca G. Howard, whose contribution of 80 acres of land was used by the committee to encourage like contributions. The corporation used both volunteer labor and contract Chinese workers to complete a narrow gauge line by 1878. The little railroad served as Olympia's only railroad connection until the Northern Pacific built a spur to Olympia in 1891.

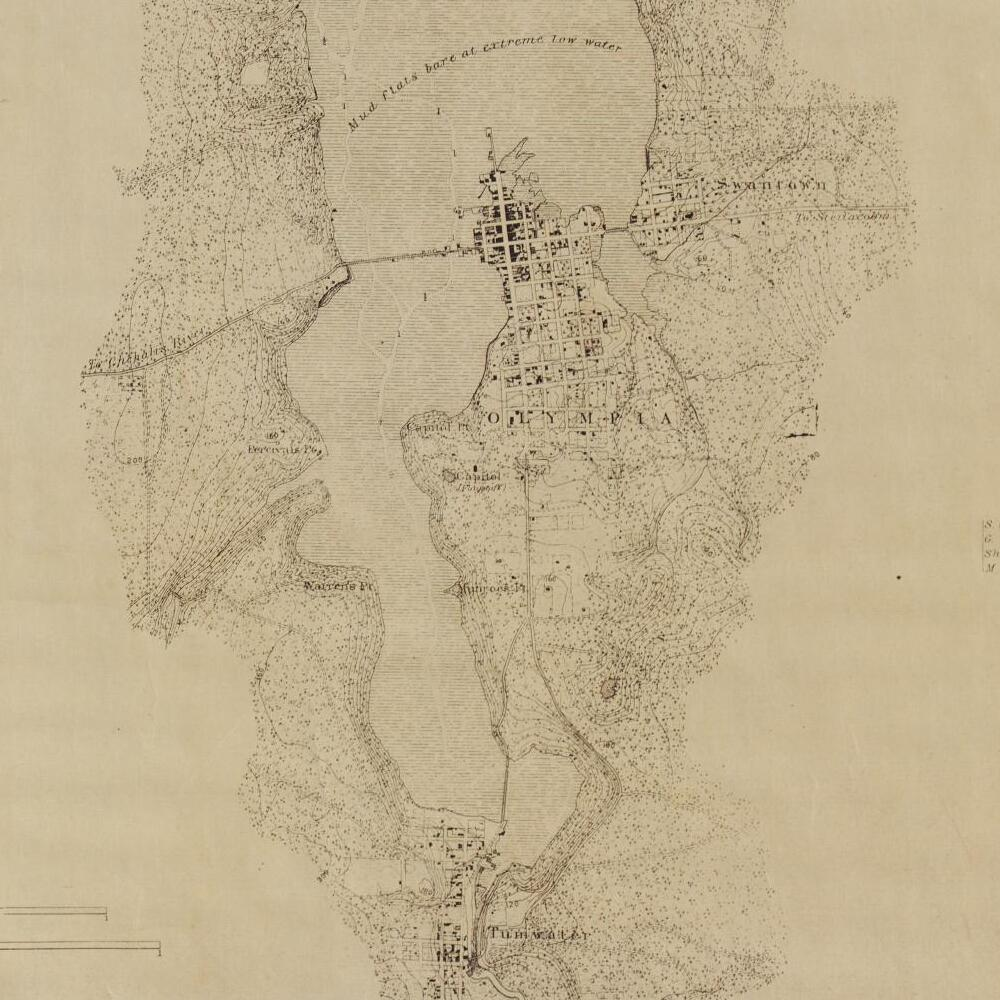
Survey of Budd Inlet, c. 1882

=== Dock construction ===
In 1885, a 4,798 feet (1,462 m) wharf was constructed North from Main Street (now Capitol Way) and remained in use for 10 years until the U.S. Army Corps of Engineers dredged the harbor in 1895.

=== Statehood ===
Washington was admitted as the 42nd state of the United States on November 11, 1889; Olympia remained the state's capital city. A week later, the new state government was installed and an elaborate celebration of statehood took place on November 18.

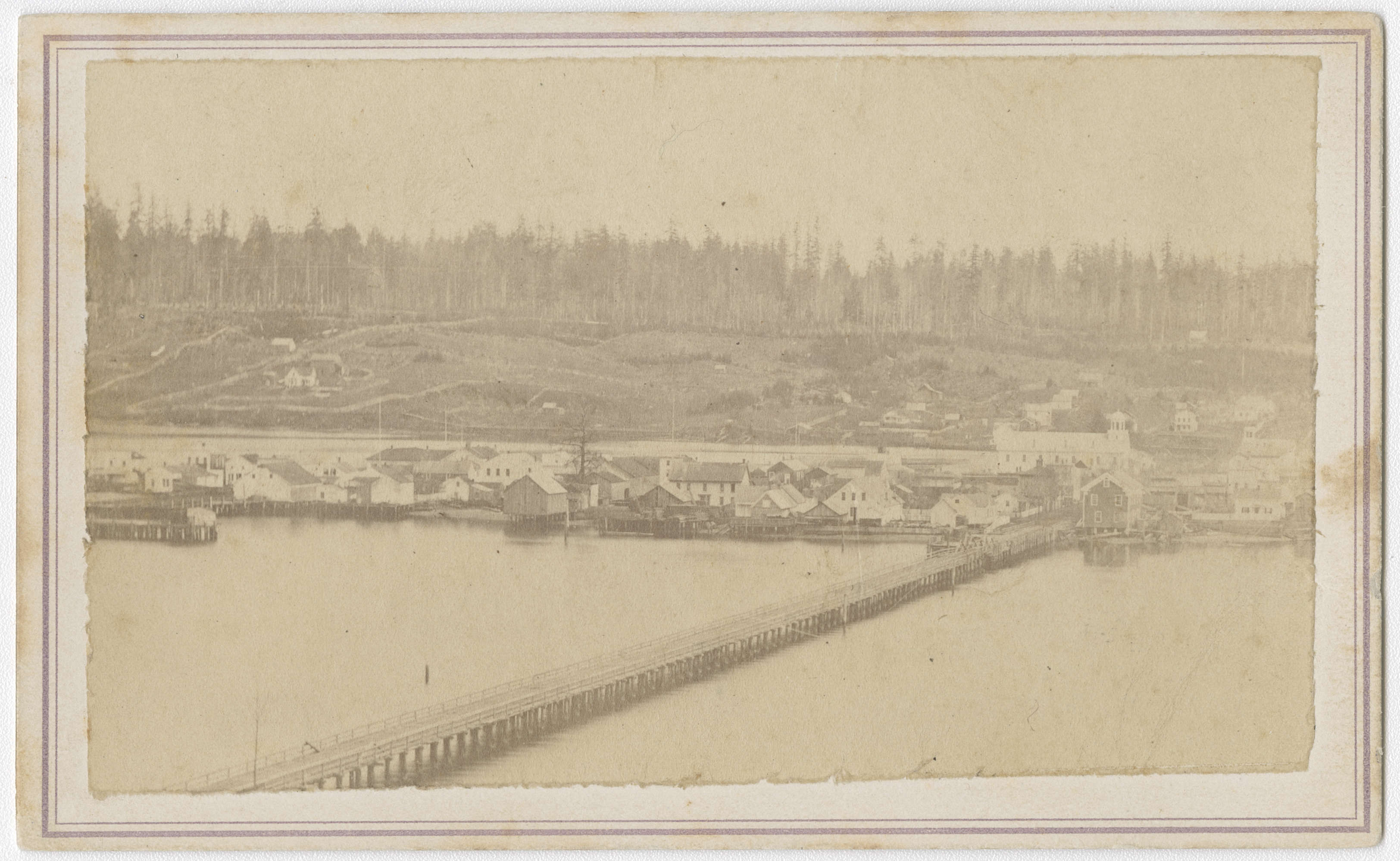
Swantown Bridge, early 1860s

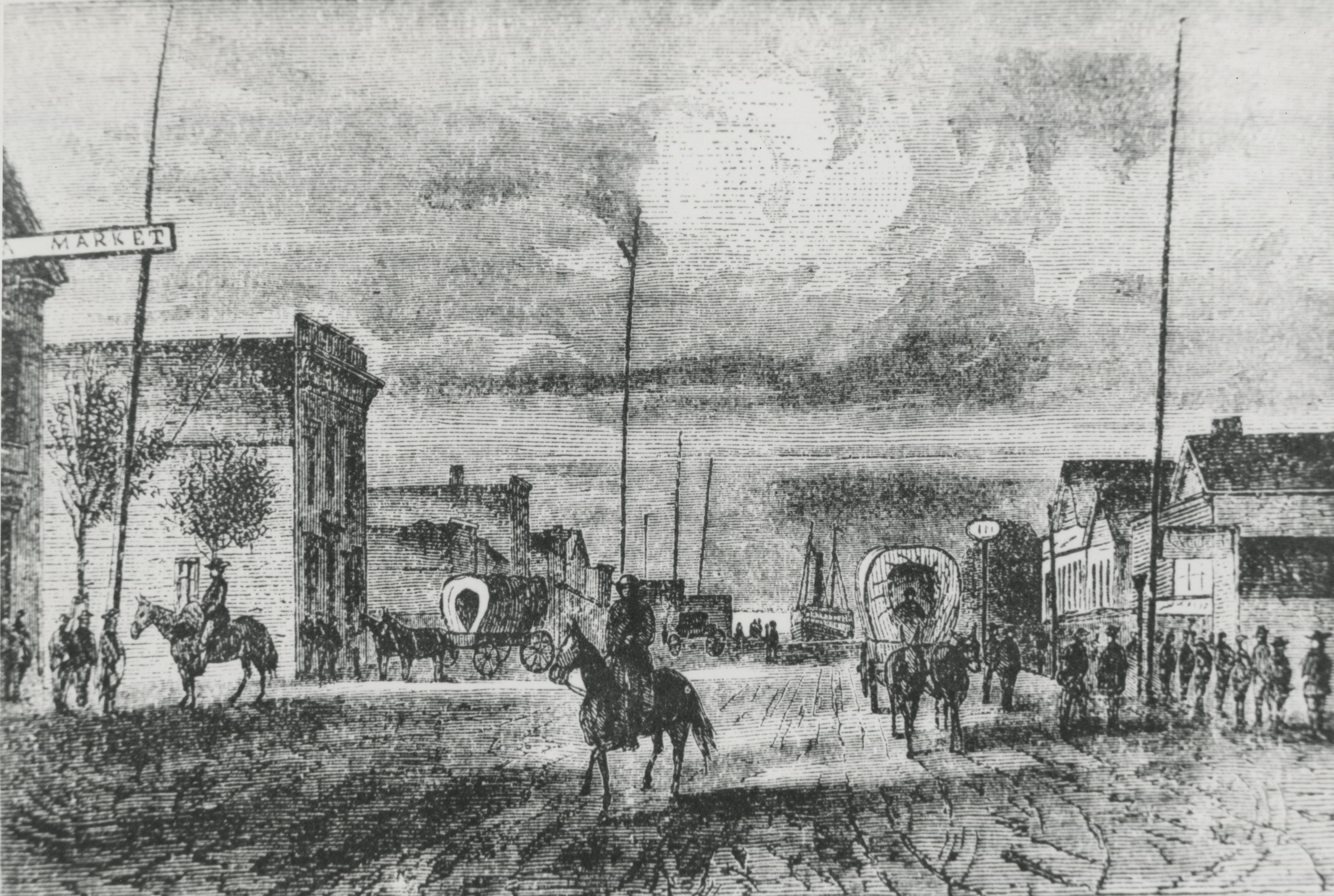
Engraving of street scene, c. 1860

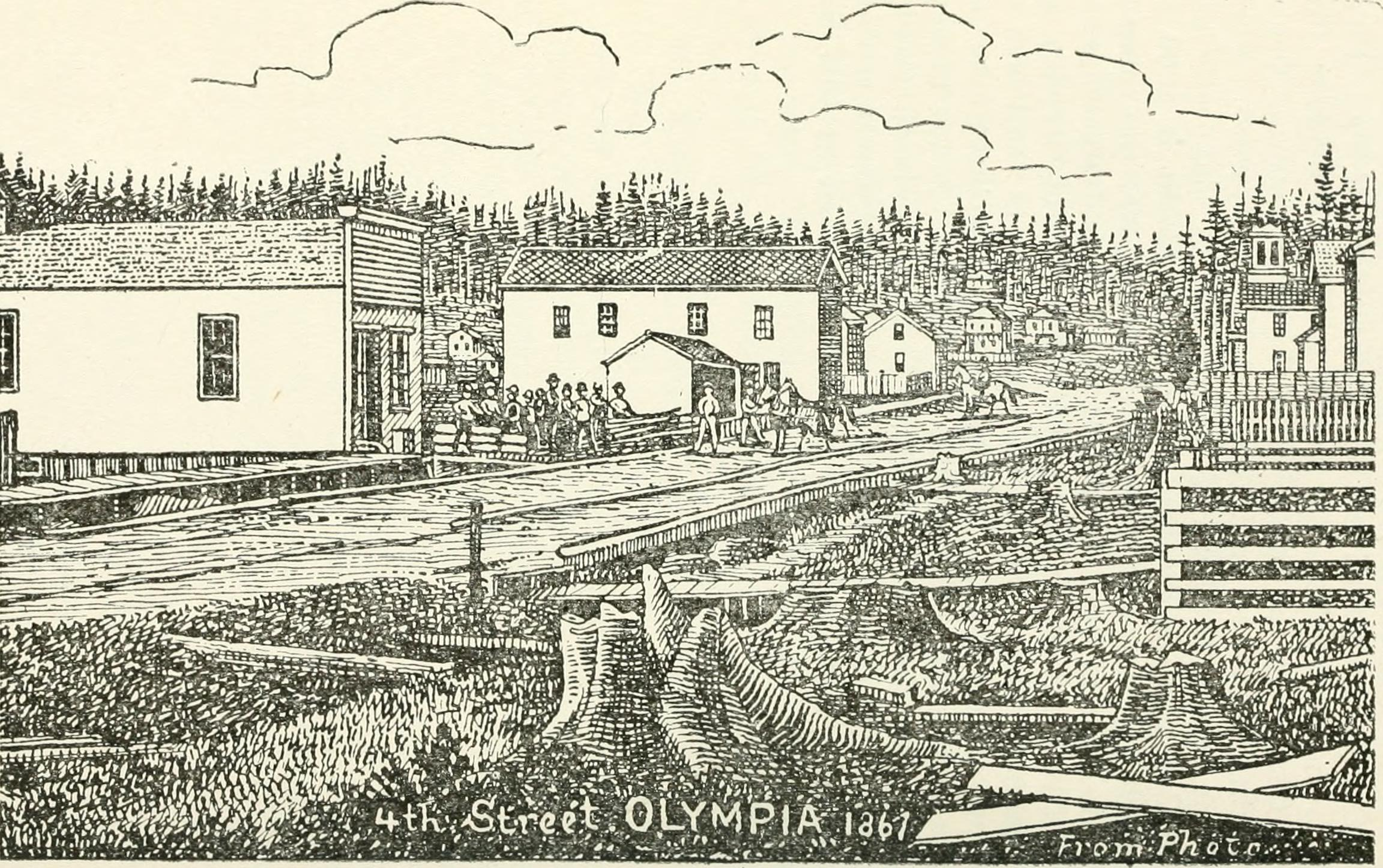
4th Street, c. 1867

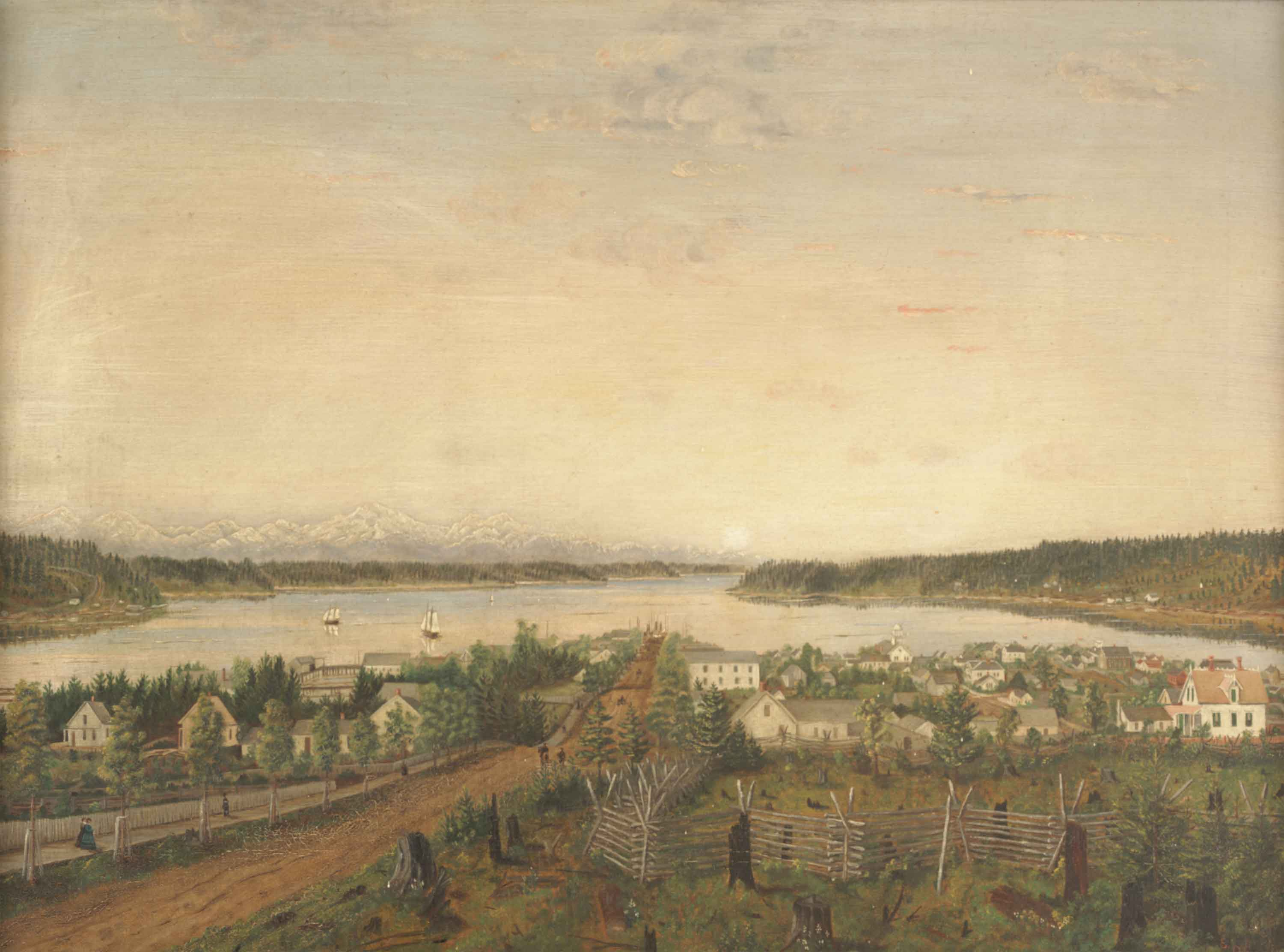
Looking North to Budd Inlet, c. 1872

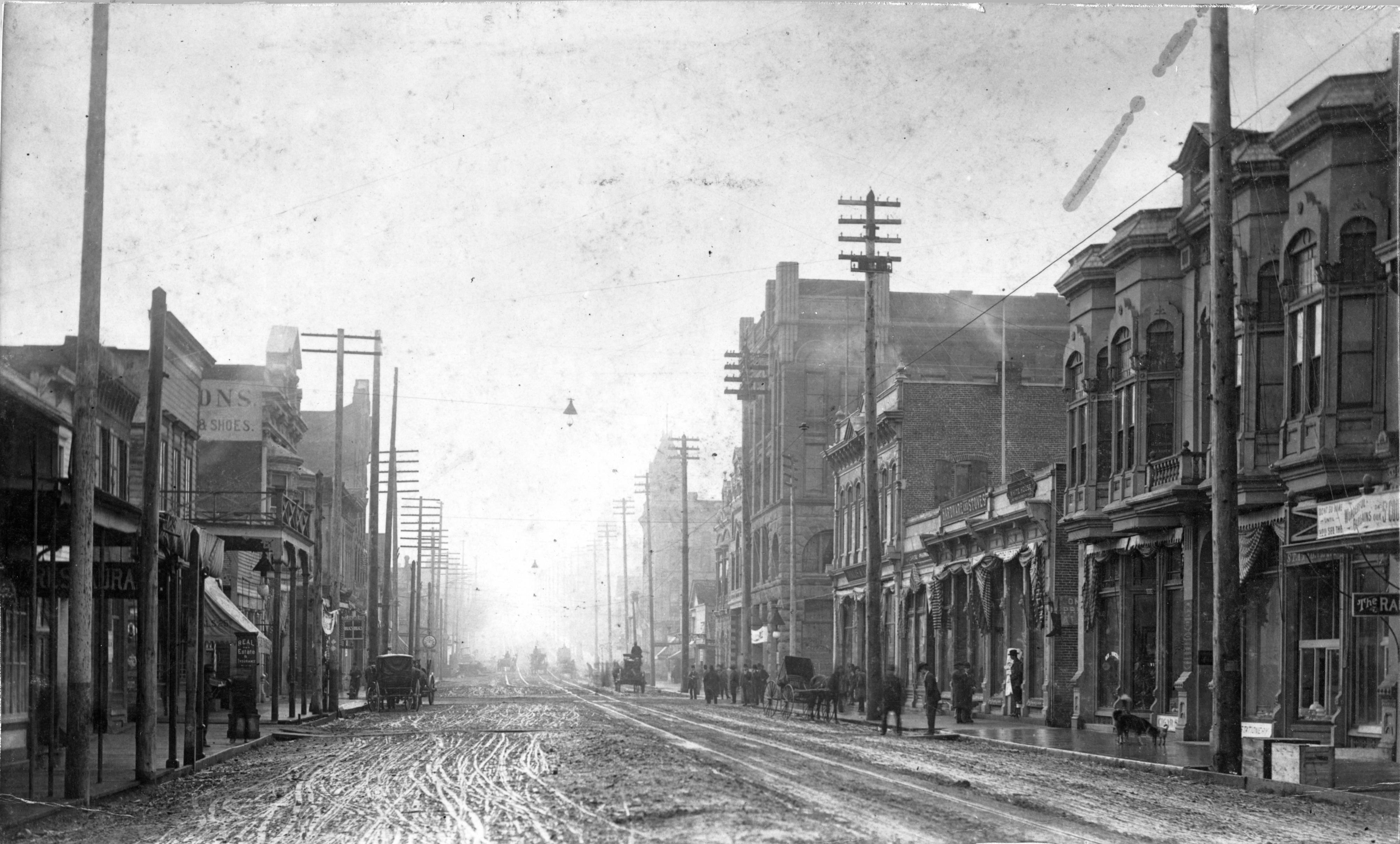
Main Street (now Capitol Way) looking South, c. 1887

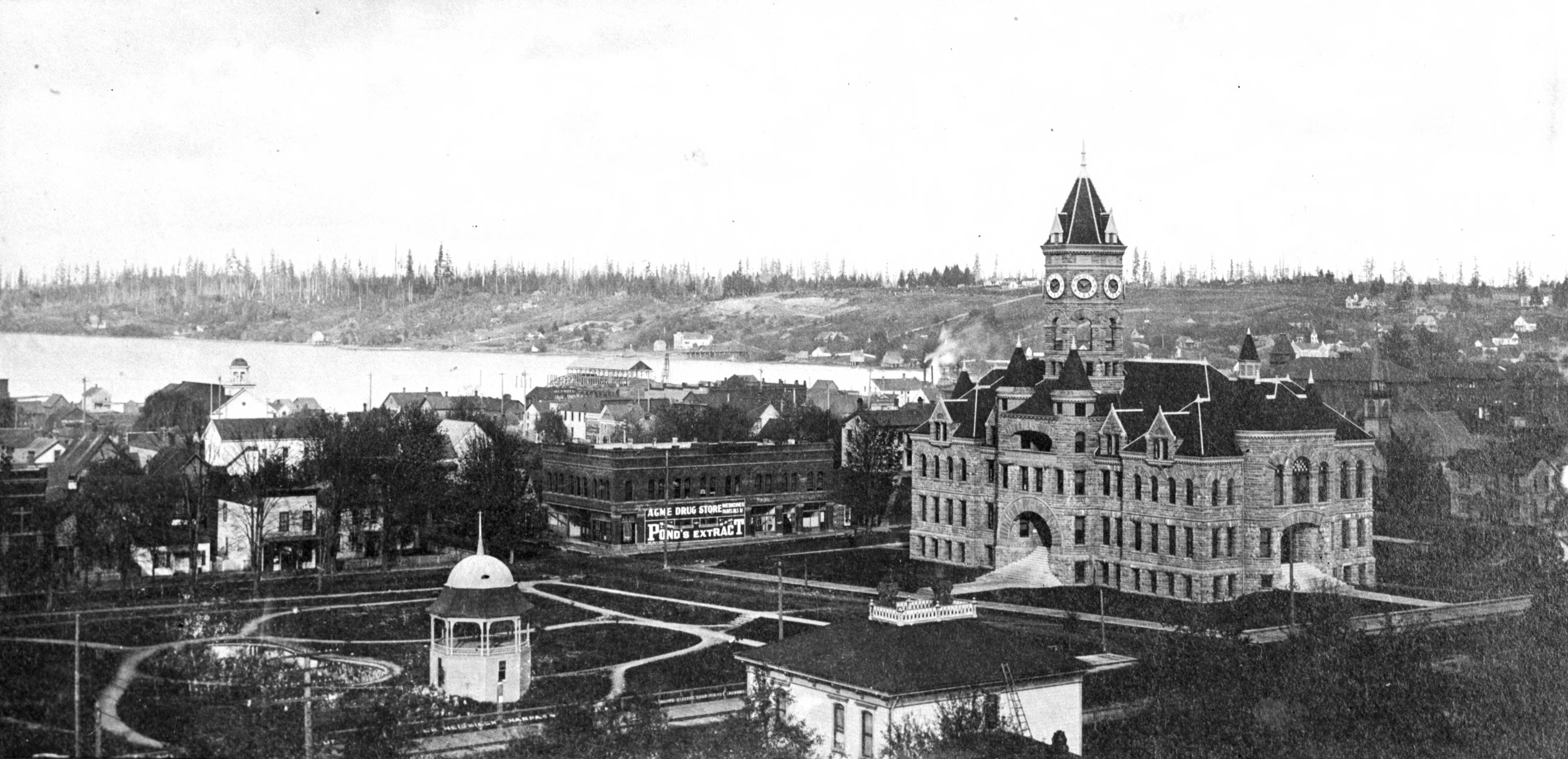
Old Capitol Building and Sylvester Park, c. 1899

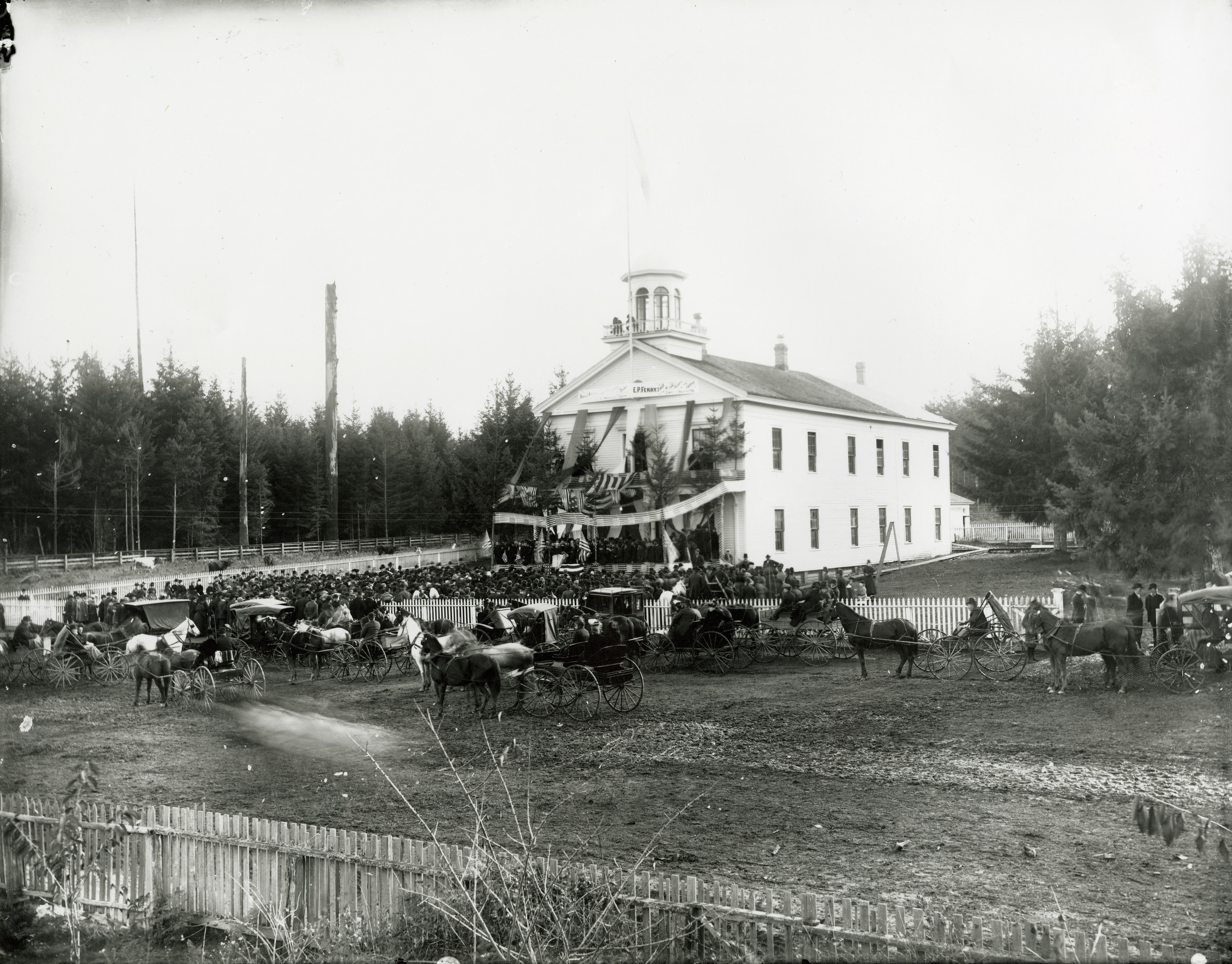
Inauguration of Governor Ferry, at the present-day Washington State Capitol, November 18, 1889

== 1890-1899 ==
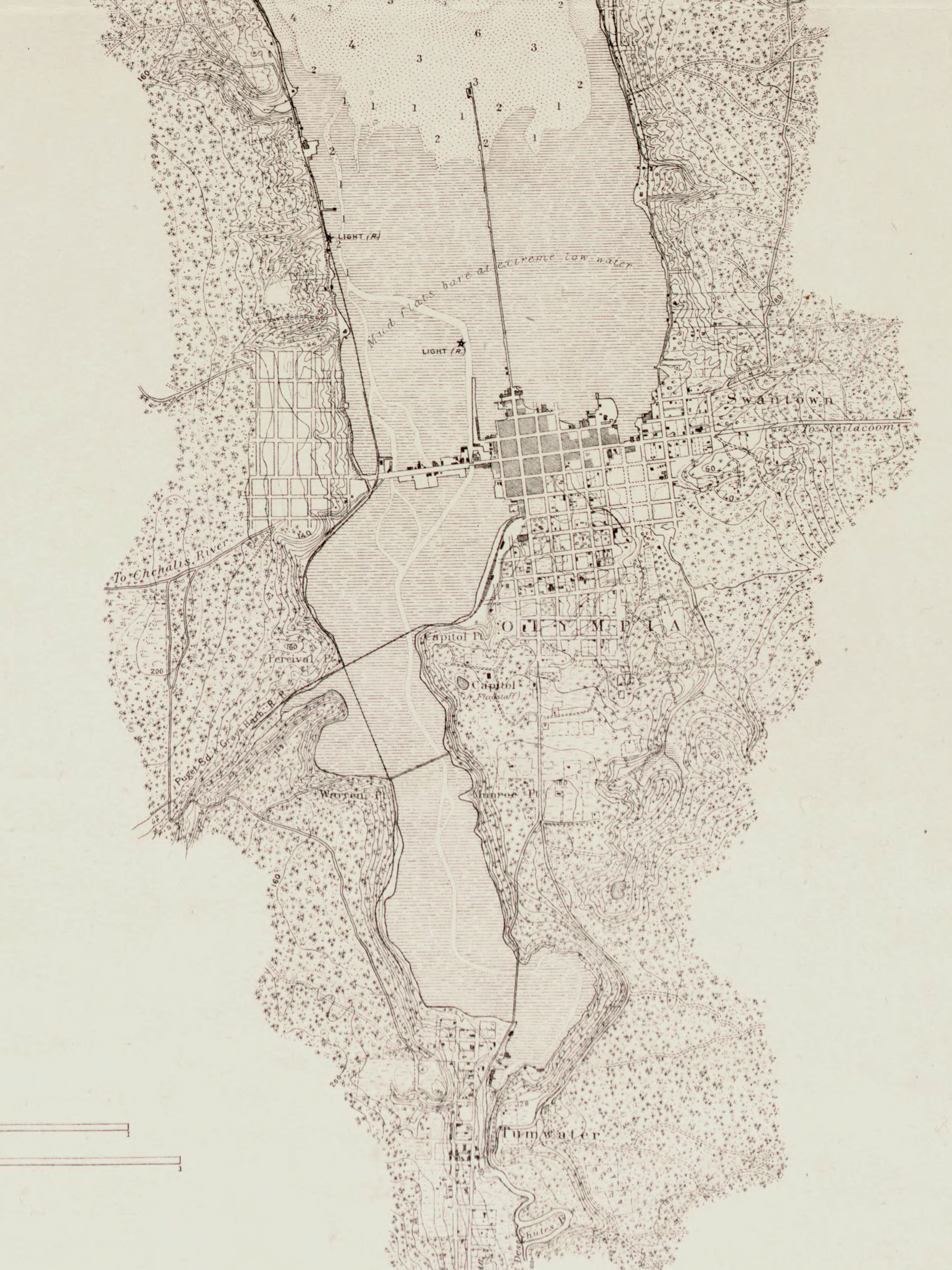
Survey of Olympia Harbor, June 1892

In 1890, the Olympia Light & Power Company (in part owned by Hazard Stevens) purchased the Gelbach flour mill for US$10,000 (equivalent to $358,333 in 2025) and built a dam to provide water to an hydroelectric power plant. This enabled an electric streetcar to run between downtown Olympia and Tumwater. By 1895, the company operated five miles of track, but had begun its foreclosure.

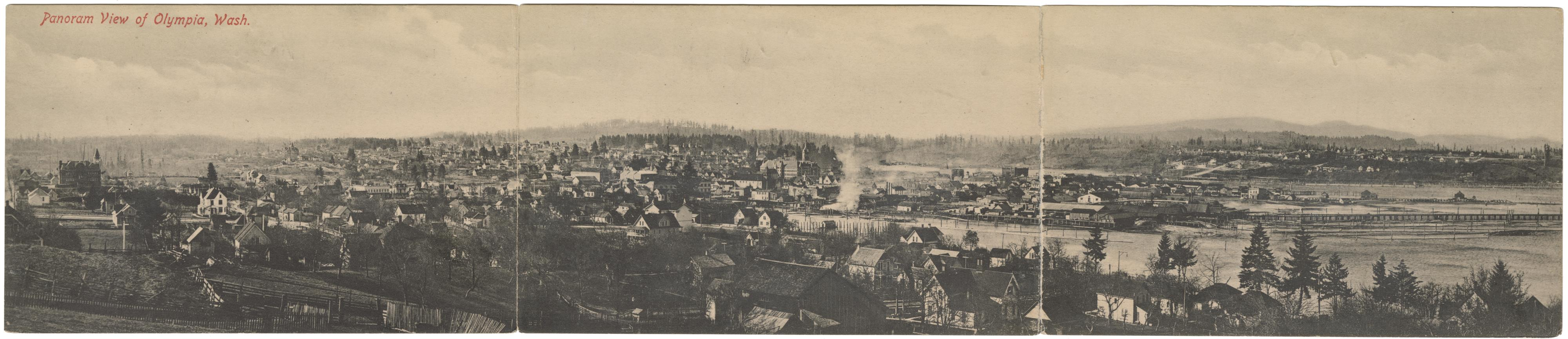
Panoramic view looking West, c. 1892

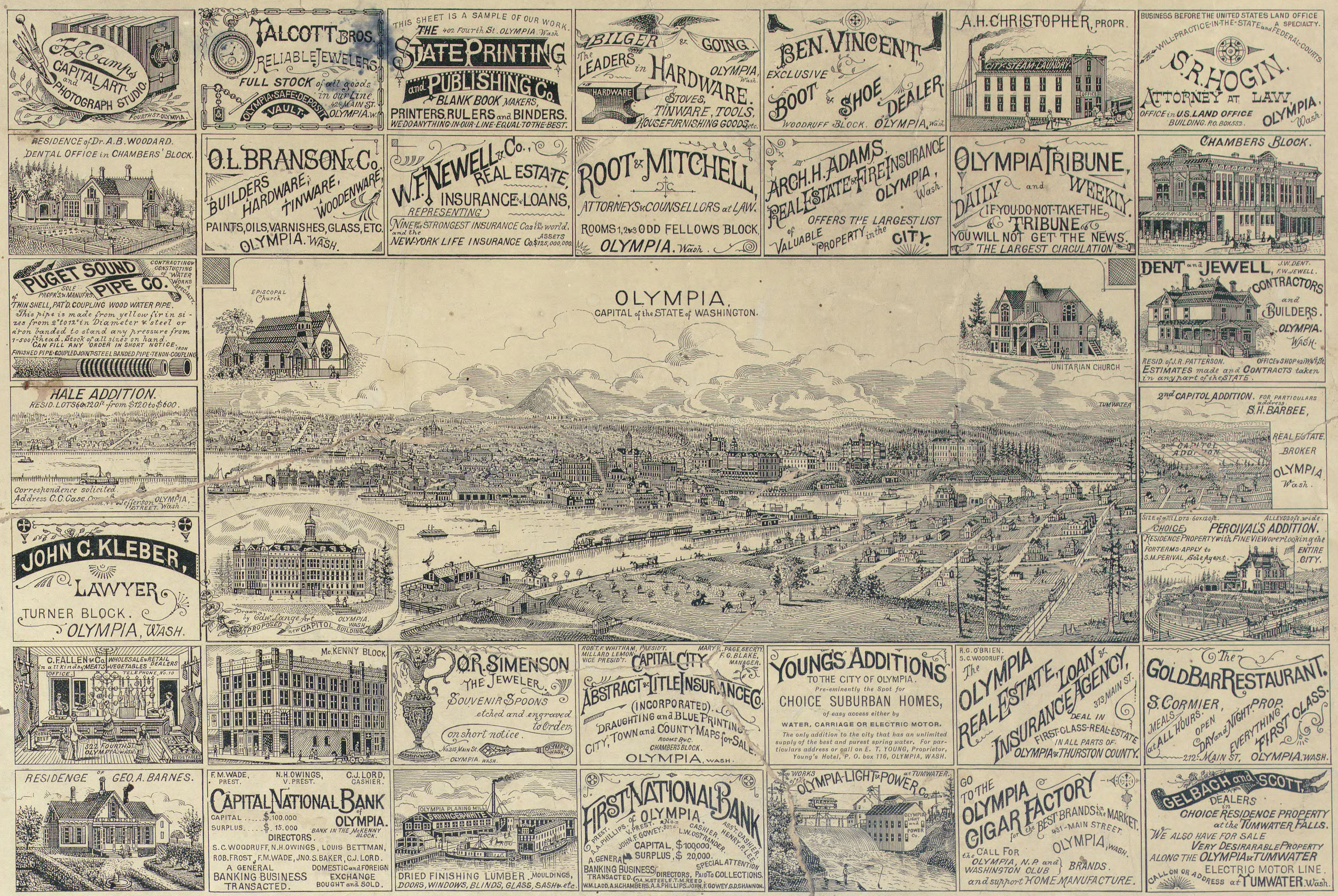
Illustrations of buildings, historic scenes and activities, c. 1890 – c. 1893

By 1892, real estate values were comparable to that of San Francisco and many speculated Olympia would be the "New York of the West". However, the panic of 1898 caused a considerable economic correction. Many Eastern Washington residents took advantage of the lower prices and purchased lots at a discount.

As the surrounding area grew, Olympia required reliable water transportation channels, which was challenging in the mud flats of Budd Inlet. In c. 1895, the U.S. Army Corps of Engineers dredged a shipping channel which would support the Puget Sound mosquito fleet and continued industrial growth.

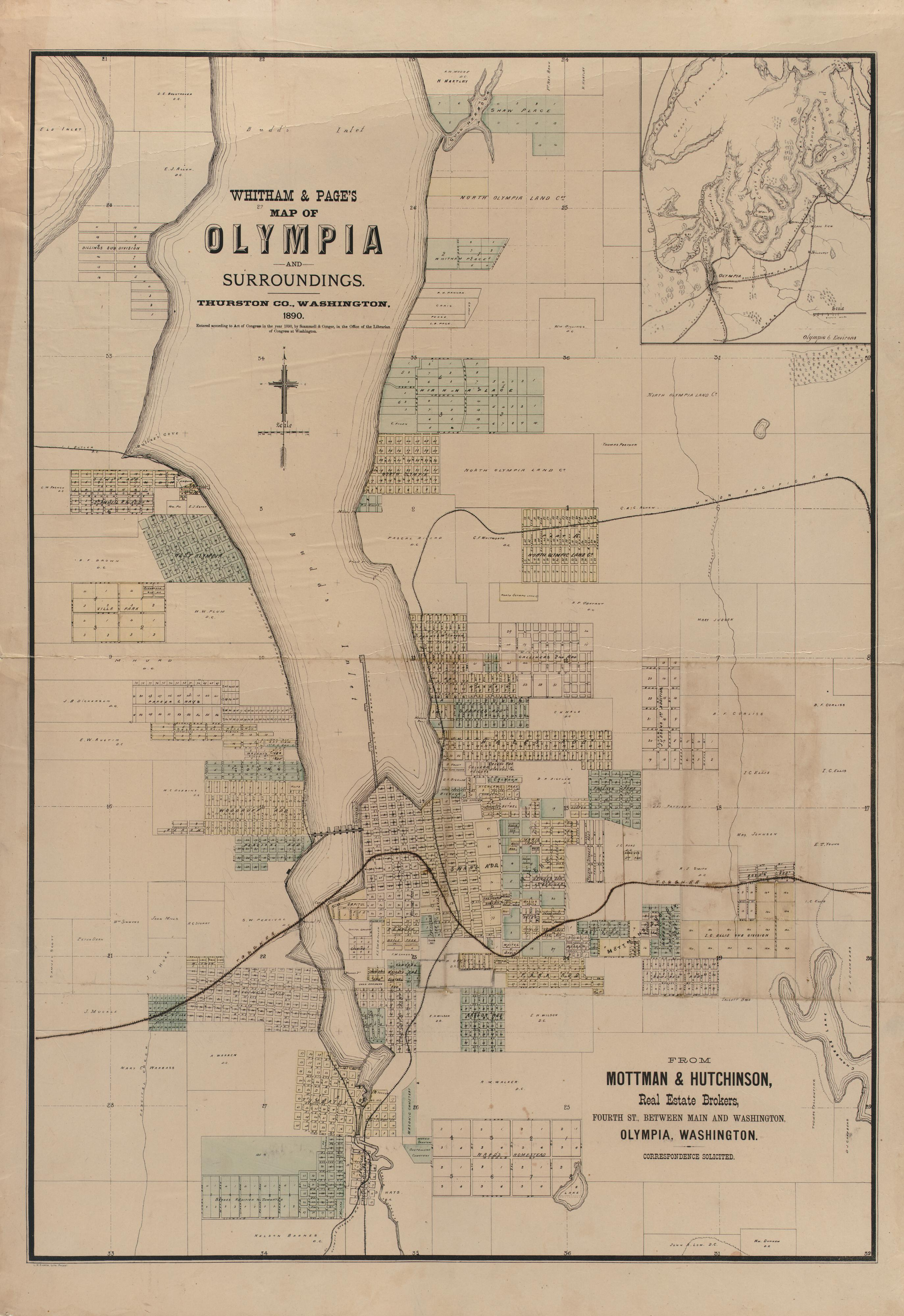
Map of surrounding area, 1890.

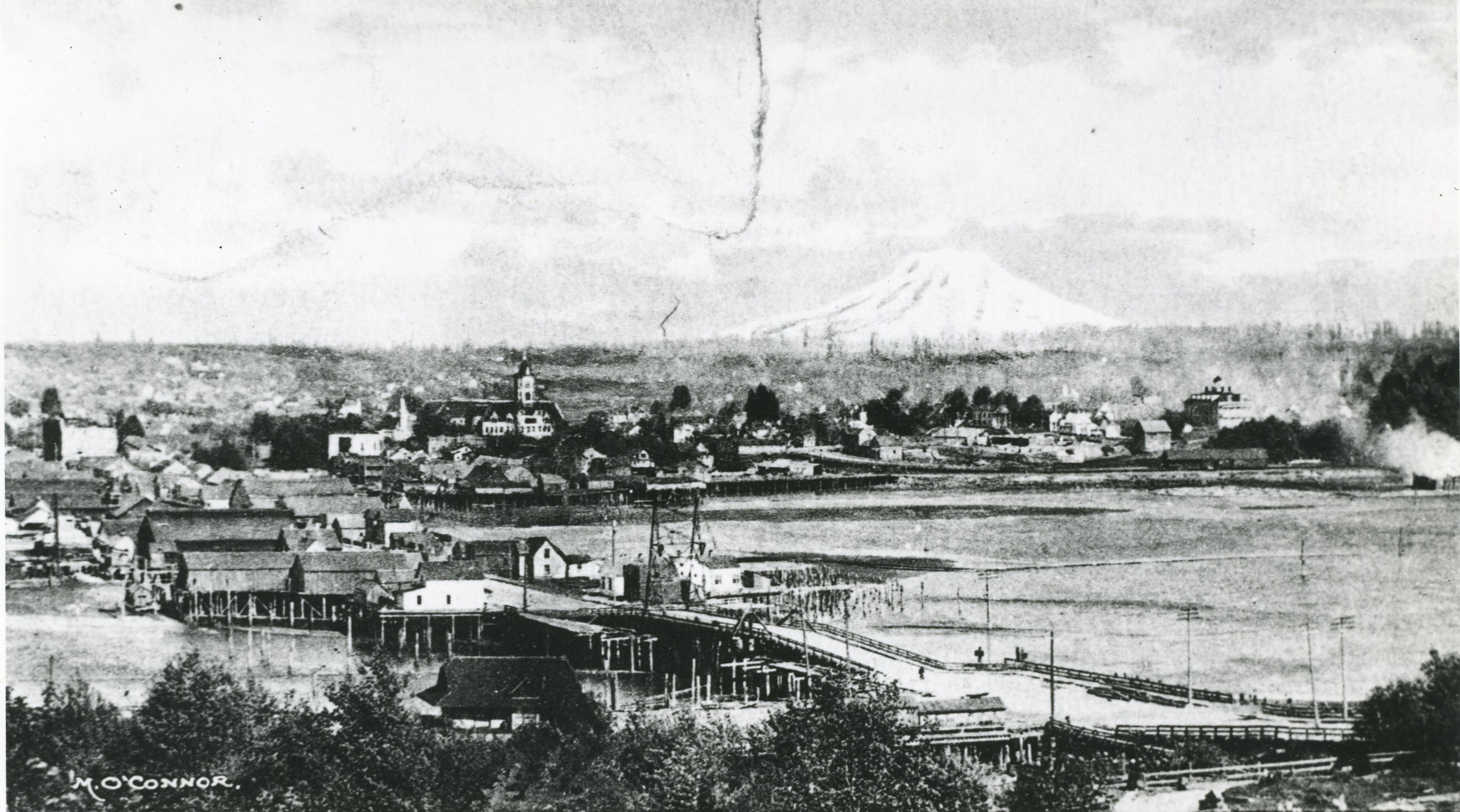
Looking Northeast to Mount Rainier, c. 1890

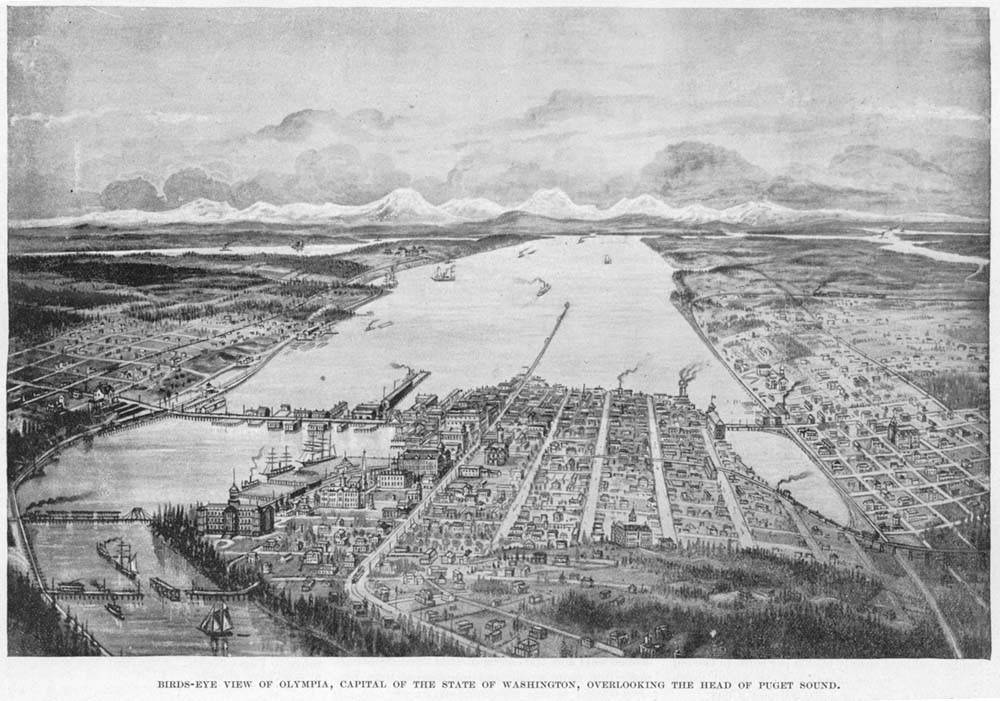
Bird's-eye view of Olympia, overlooking Budd Inlet, 1893.

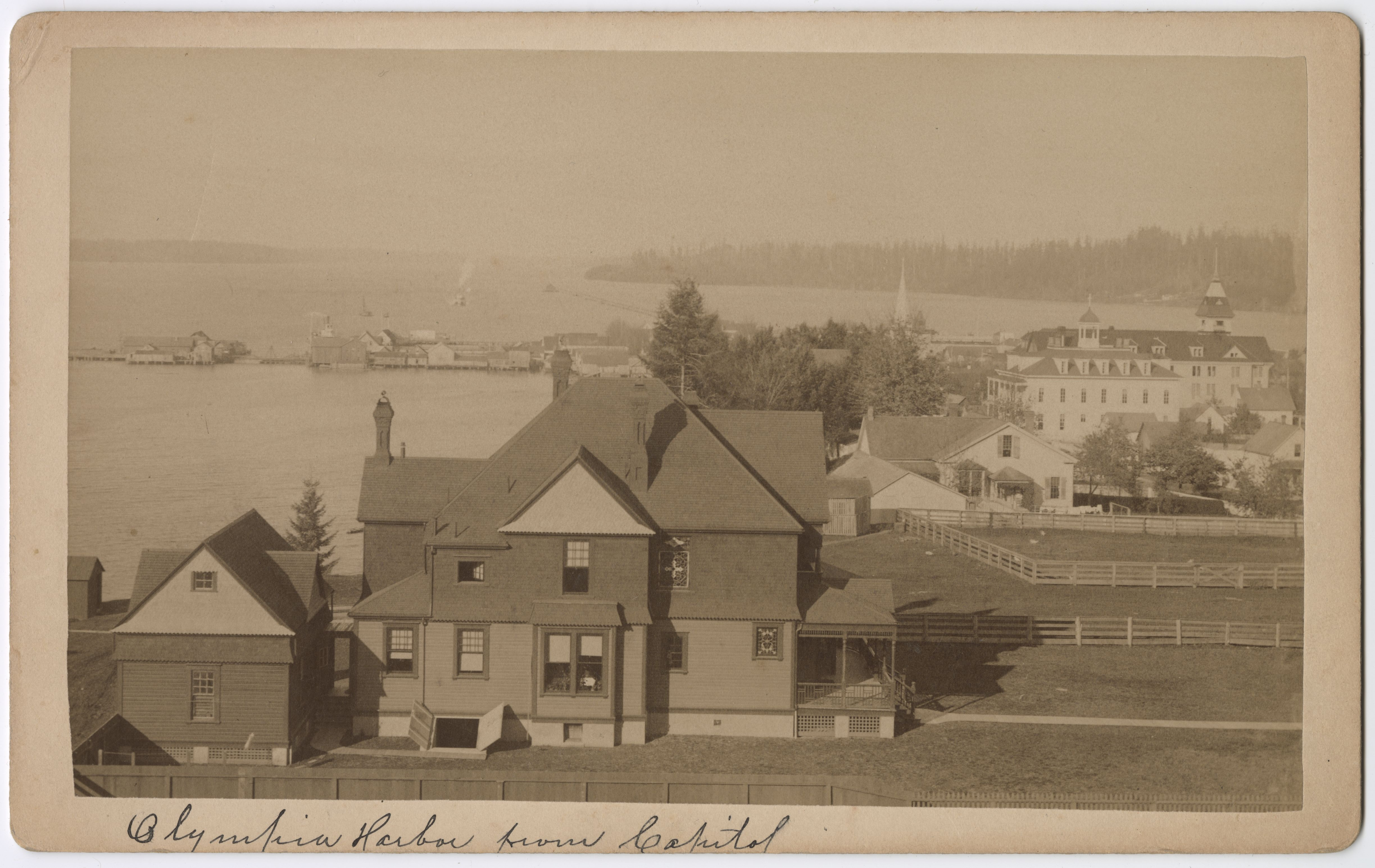
Looking North from Capitol Building, c. 1895

== 1900-1929 ==
By 1905, Olympia had daily steamboat services to other cities on the Puget Sound and San Francisco, free mail delivery, water works, sewage system, several hotels, a fire department, an opera house, and several schools. Each month, 3,000,000 feet (910,000 m) of lumber and 15 million shingles were shipped from the port. The largest wooden pipe factory in the United States was also in operation, as were sash, glove and door factories, a fruit extract plant, and other industry.

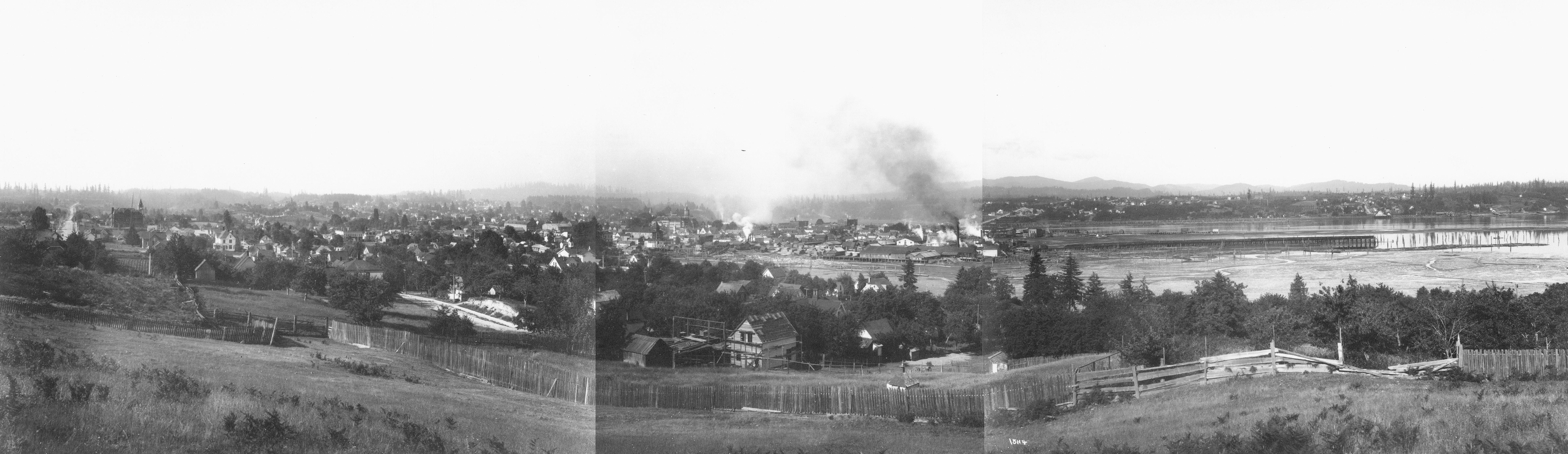
Asahel Curtis panorama of Budd Inlet, 1909

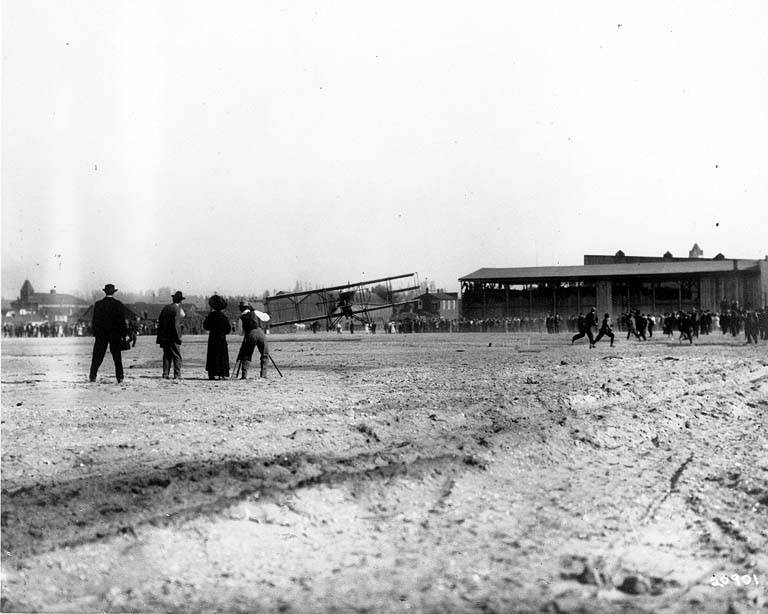
Wiseman landing his biplane on the newly filled port, 1911. Old Capitol Building tower can be seen in the background, center right.

In 1909, the city underwent several road grading and sidewalk paving projects: 50 blocks of cement sidewalks downtown to replace worn wooden walkways; 7 miles (11 km) of cement and board sidewalks in residential areas; the completion of 4th Street paving; and the construction of approximately a dozen blocks on tide-flats.

Later that year, and through 1911, 2,300,000 cubic feet (65,000 m^{3}) of Budd Inlet mudflats were dredged, creating an additional 29 city blocks. In May 1911, Aviator Fred J. Wiseman landed his aircraft (the first one to carry mail) on the newly filled area.

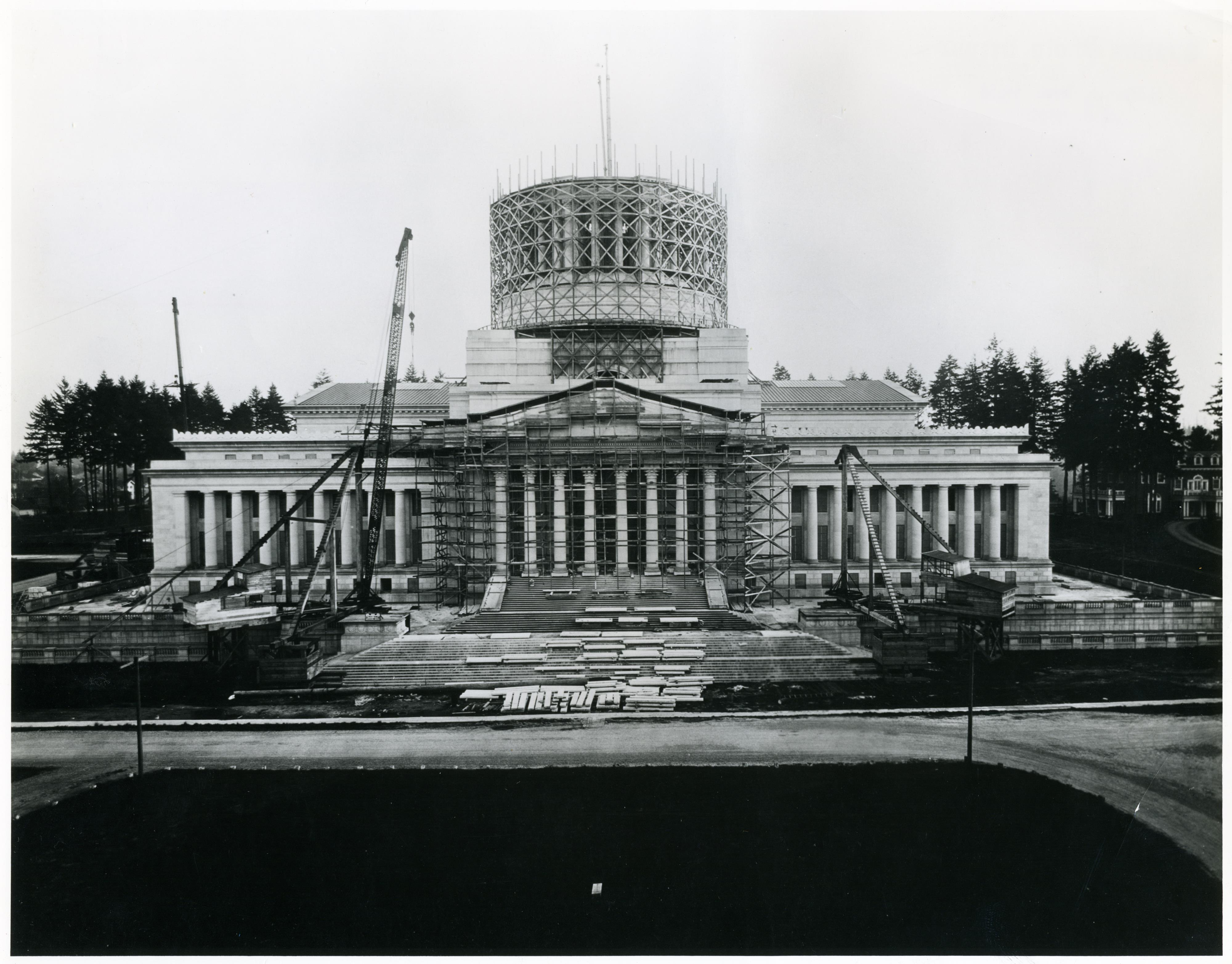
Legislative Building construction, 1926.

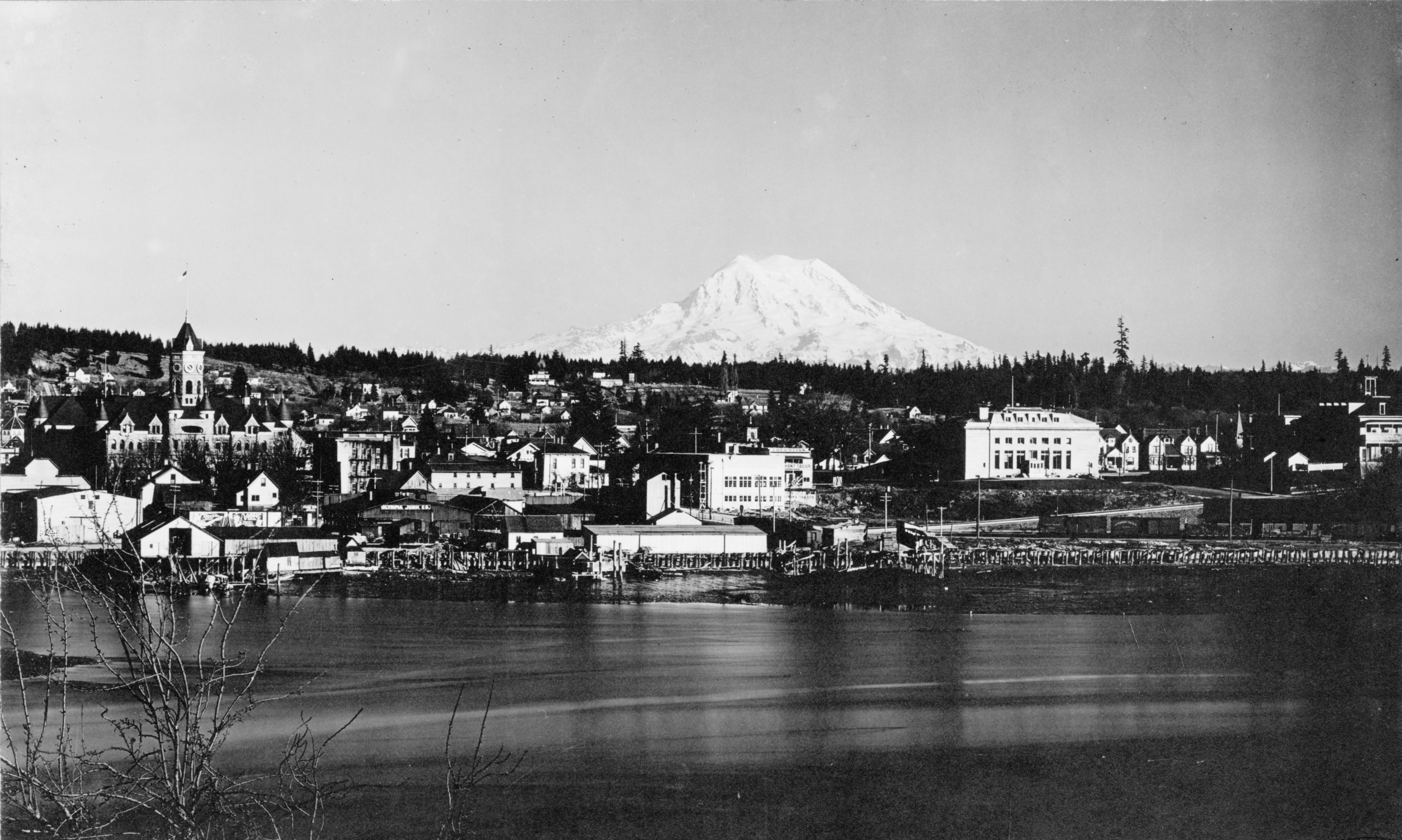
Mt. Rainier and Olympic Range, looking East, c. 1916

Construction of the current Washington State Capitol began in 1912, with the prominent Legislative Building, one of the largest in the nation, completed in 1928. The building's dome is the fourth largest free-standing masonry dome in the world.

While early on, extraction industries such as logging and oystering were the basis of much of the economy, by the 20th century, sawmilling, fruit canning, and other industrial concerns comprised the city's economic base. Olympia also served as a shipping port for materials produced from the surrounding countryside, including sandstone, coal, and agricultural products.

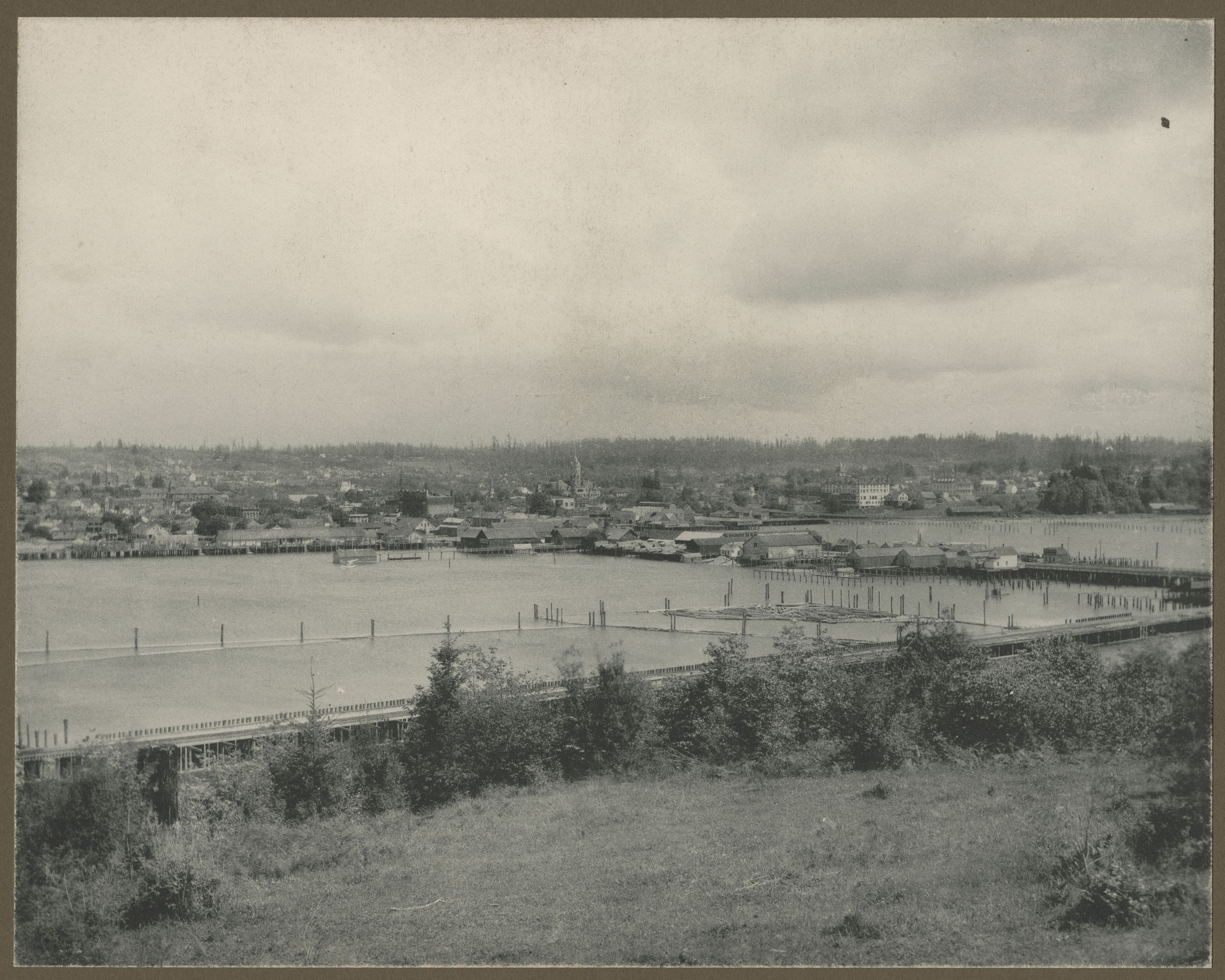
View from Northwest, c. 1900

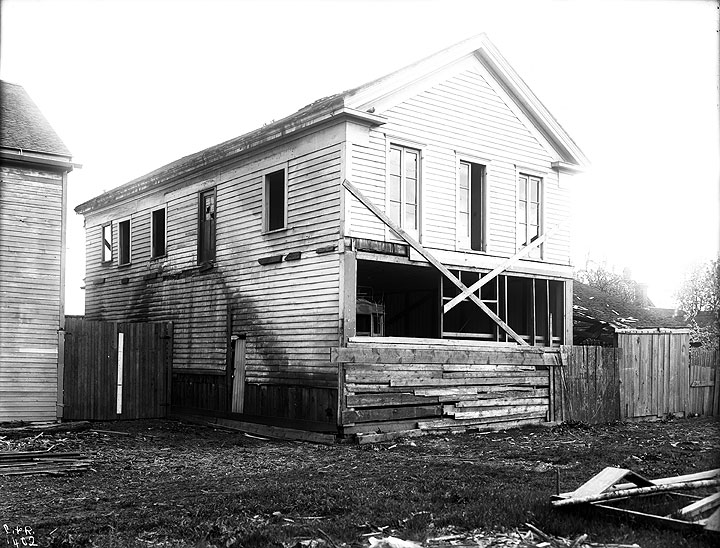
Gold Bar Restaurant (location for 1st session of the Washington State Legislature) in ruins, April 30, 1902

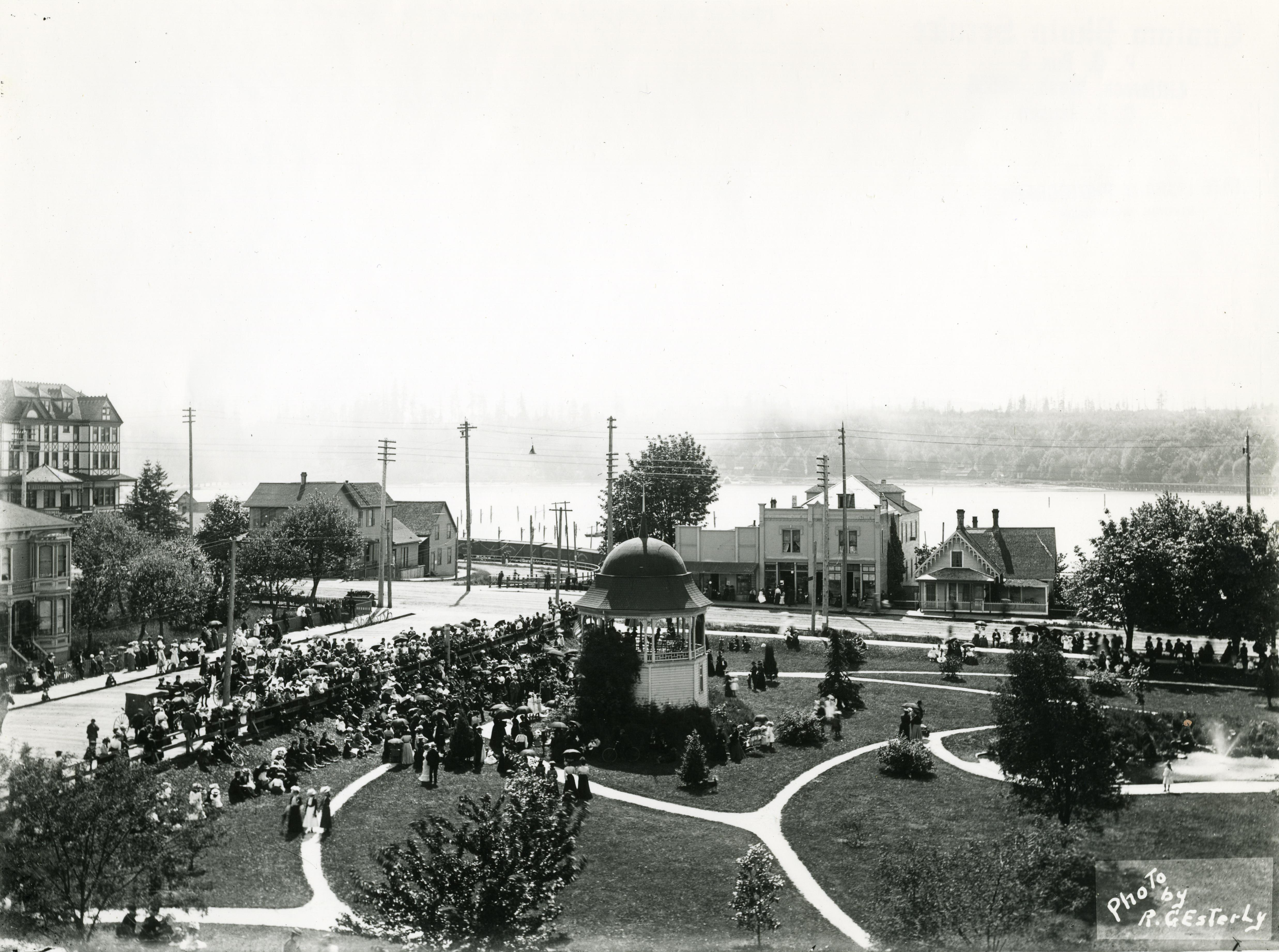
Gathering at Sylvester Park, c. 1895 – c. 1904

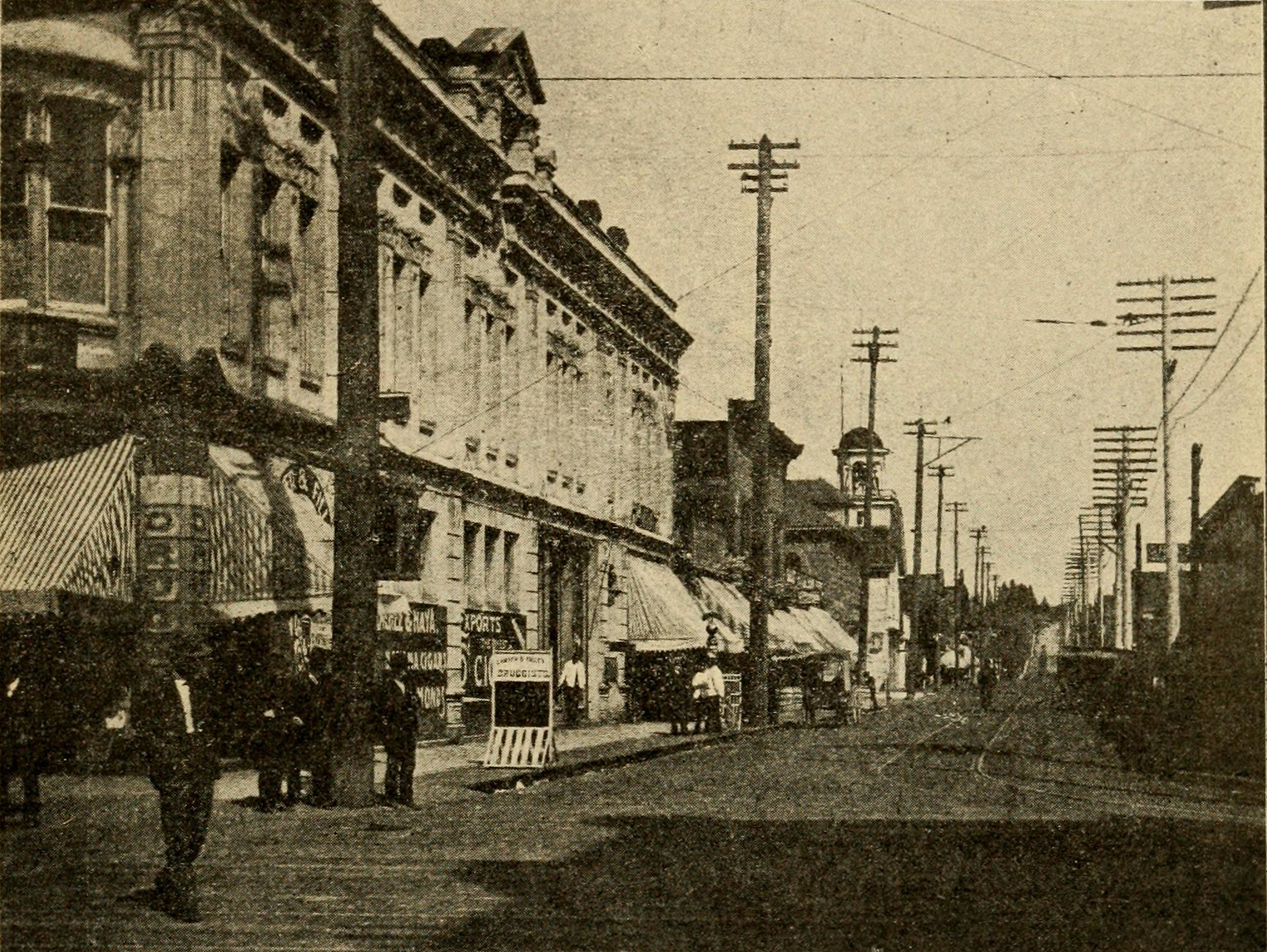
4th Ave. looking East from Main St. (a.k.a. Chambers Block), c. 1905

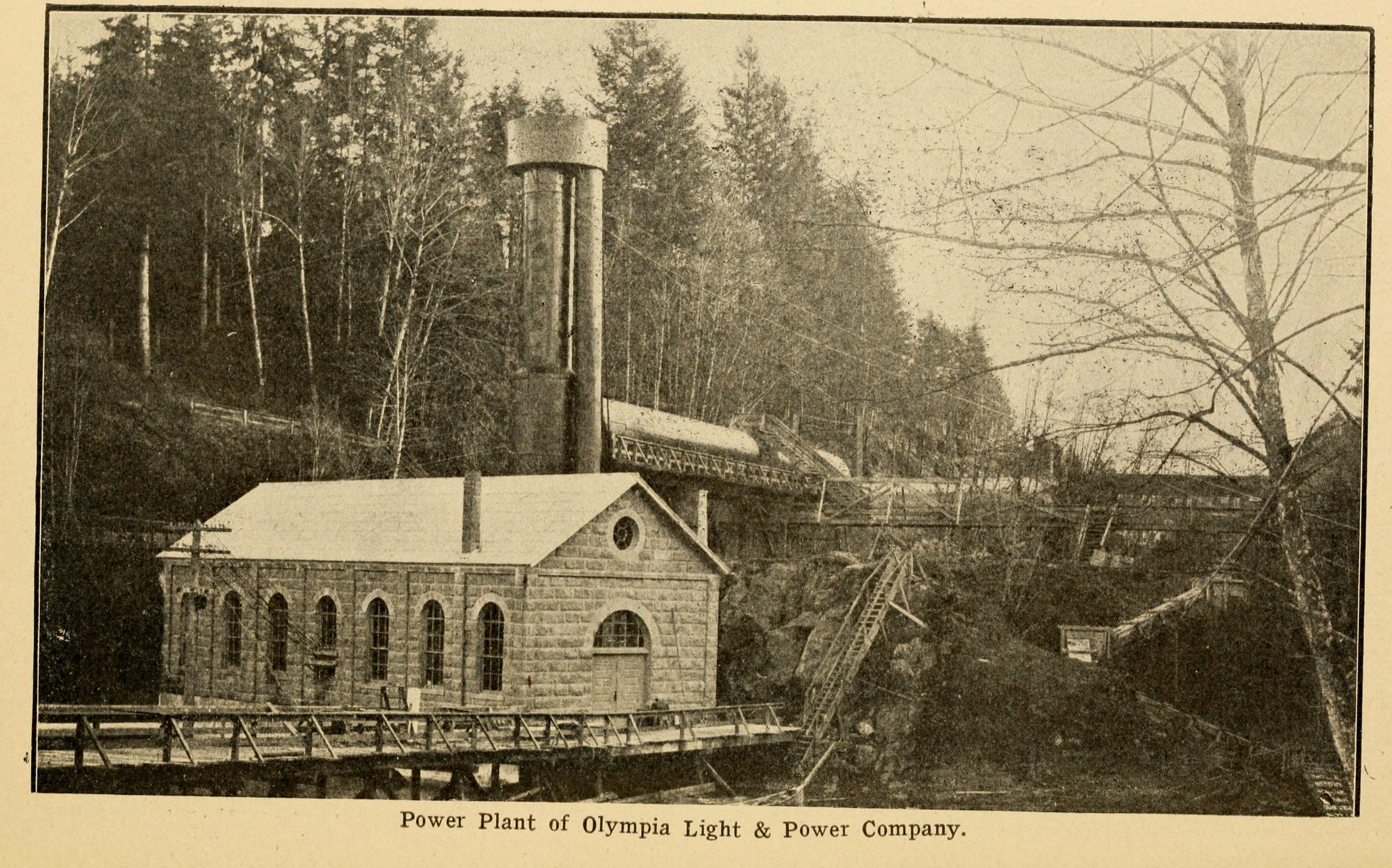
Olympia Light & Power Company plant, c. 1905

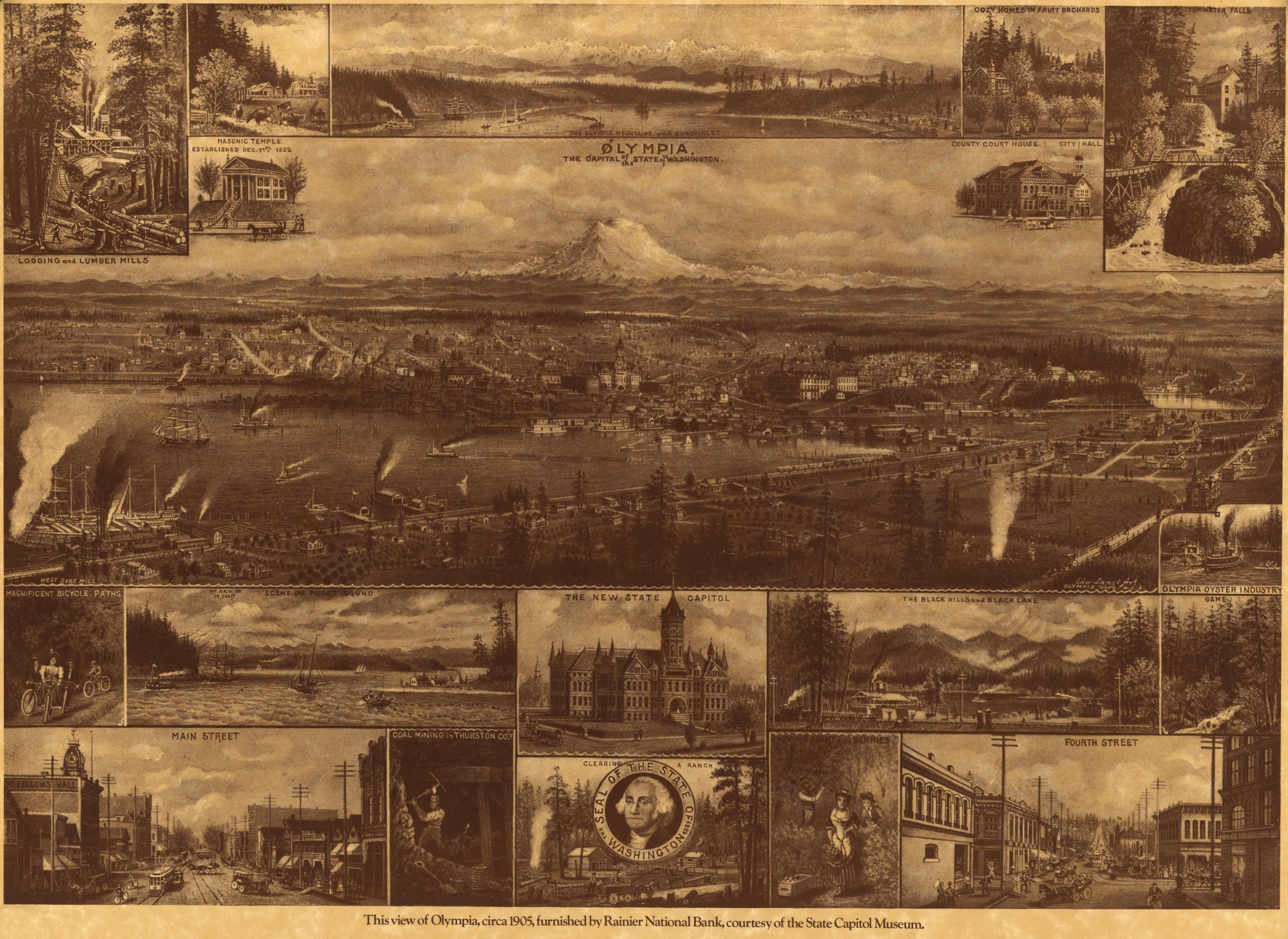
Composite print showing scenes from Olympia, c. 1905

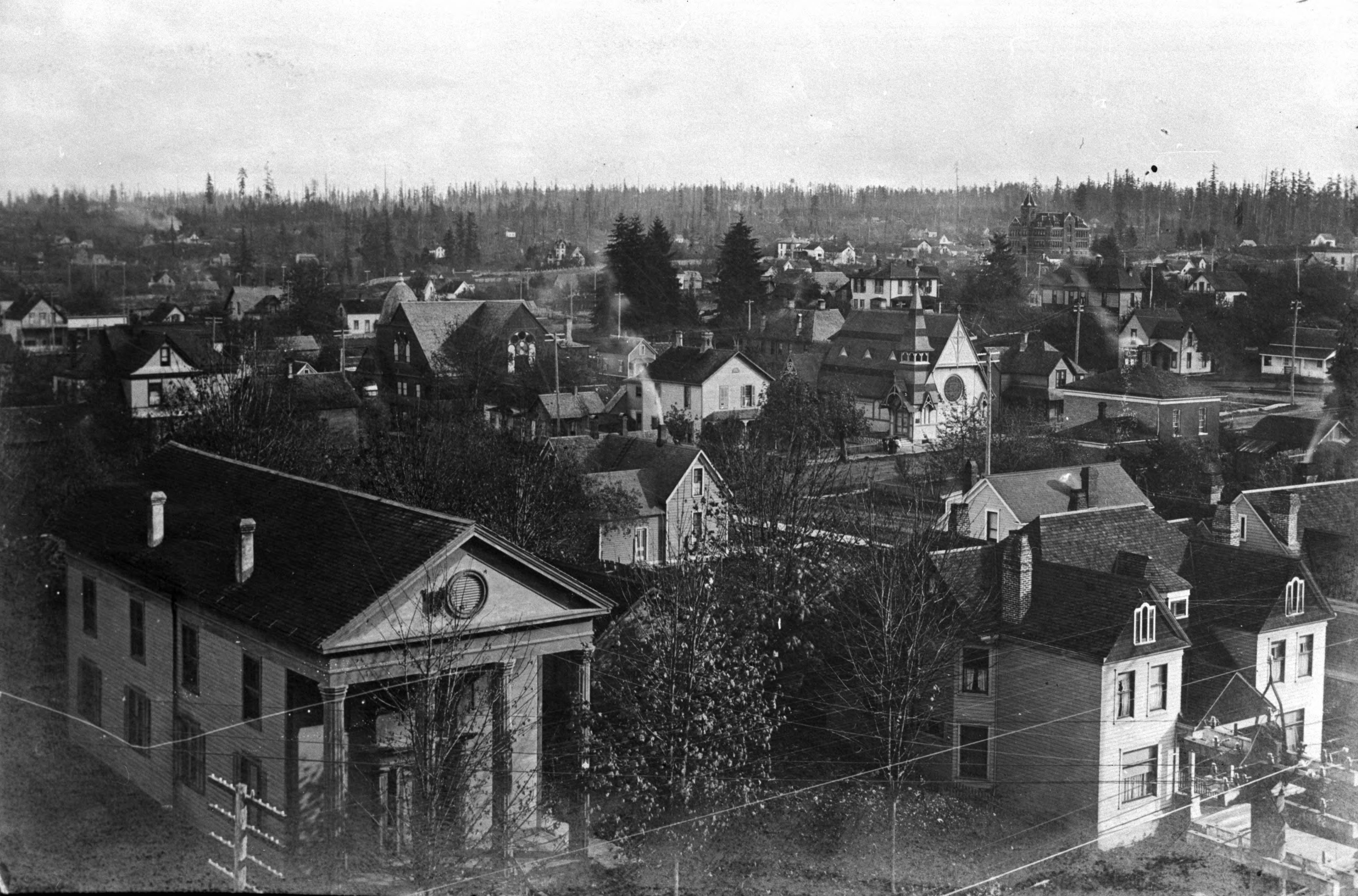
Masonic Temple and original State Capitol in distance at upper right, pre-1911

== 1930–1959 ==
Scandinavian immigrants founded two cooperative plywood mills after World War I. During World War I and World War II, there were also increased influxes of workers attracted by wartime industries including shipbuilding.

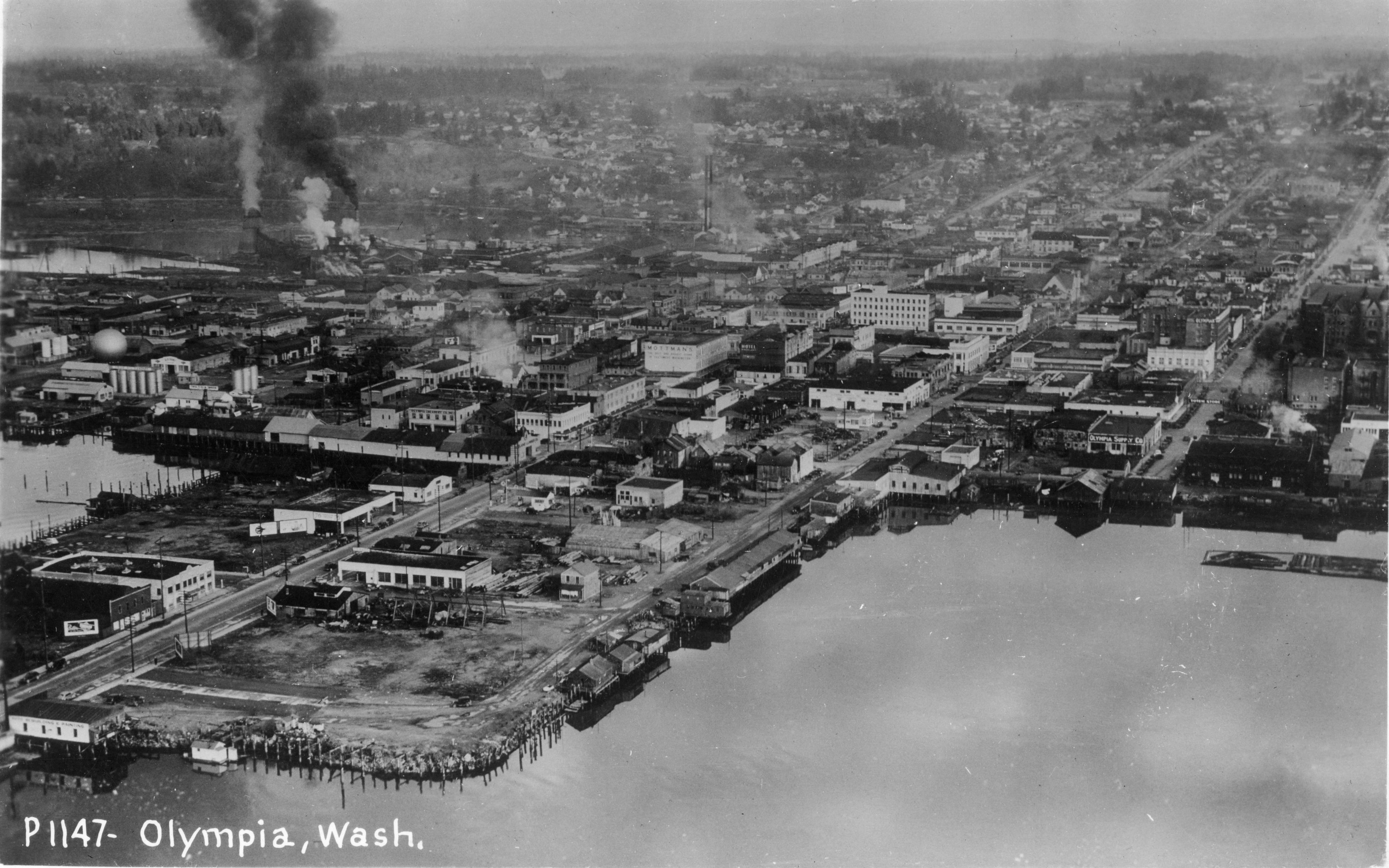
Legion Way is at center right, running past the Old Capitol Building, c. 1946 – c. 1949

The Wildwood Center - Olympia's first shopping center - was built in 1938 at Eskridge and Capitol Way. The building was designed by Joseph Wohleb in the Streamline Moderne style. It featured a grocery store, pharmacy, and flower shop.

The Puget Sound area is at great risk of different types of earthquakes. The 1949 earthquake damaged many historic downtown buildings beyond repair, and they were demolished. Others were retrofit with new facades to replace the damaged Nineteenth century wood and glass storefronts. Subsequently, much of Olympia's downtown reflects mid-twentieth-century architectural trends. Olympia also suffered significant damage from the 1965 Puget Sound and 2001 Nisqually earthquakes; it was the closest major city to the epicenter of the 2001 event.

In May 1950, the residents celebrated the city's Centennial with a parade, dressing up in 1800s clothing as pioneers and building a small log cabin in Sylvester Park.

In 1951, construction on the Fifth Avenue dam was completed, severing Deschutes River and the Puget Sound to create Capitol Lake, a freshwater lake.

== 1960–present ==
Since the 1960s Olympia has lost much of its earlier waterfront industry, including lumber and plywood mills, shipbuilding, power pole manufacture and other concerns. While the shipping port and log staging area remains, Olympia's waterfront area has gentrified since the 1980s.

In 1967, the state legislature approved the creation of The Evergreen State College near Olympia, mostly due to the efforts of progressive Republican Governor Daniel J. Evans. Evans later served as president of the college, leaving Evergreen in 1983 when he was appointed to the United States Senate to fill the vacancy caused by Senator Henry M. "Scoop" Jackson's death.

Because of the college's presence, Olympia has become a hub for artists and musicians (many of whom have been influential in punk, post-punk, anti-folk, lo-fi and other music trends (see Olympia music scene)). In 2003 Outside Magazine named Olympia one of the best college towns in the nation for its vibrant downtown and access to outdoor activities.

Olympia is a regional center for social justice and environmental activism. Olympia was the hometown of activist Rachel Corrie. Olympia has been the site of direct-action opposition to the Iraq War. The city has constructed several tiny home villages as temporary or permanent housing solutions, such as Quixote Village.

Olympia hosts the state's largest annual Earth Day celebration, Procession of the Species, a community arts-based festival and parade. Also popular is the Olympia Farmers Market, the second largest in Washington State, as well as the locally based Olympia Food Co-op.

== See also ==
- History of Washington
- National Register of Historic Places listings in Thurston County, Washington
- Olympia Brewing Company
- Captain Hale House
