= Levi Lathrop Smith =

Settler in Oregon Territory, United States

- Born: March 6, year unknown New York State
- Died: August 30, 1848; Puget Sound near present-day Tumwater
- Occupation: Pioneer
- Known for: Original settler of present-day Olympia, Washington

Levi Lathrop Smith was an Oregon Territory original settler of present-day Olympia, Washington, arriving with Edmund Sylvester in 1846. Smith died of drowning in 1848, shortly after being elected to the Oregon Territorial Legislature, passing his property claim to Sylvester.

== Biography ==
Smith was born on March 6 in New York State. He was a Presbyterian divinity student. He later emigrated to Wisconsin where he became "attached to a half-caste girl, a catholic [sic]. To marry under these circumstances would be a violation of rule, and he made another to remove to Oregon."

Smith and Sylvester arrived in Newmarket, Oregon (Note: The settlers' name, Newmarket and sometimes New Market, later changed to Tumwater.) in October 1846. On October 20, Smith took claim to the land next to Budd Inlet, while Sylvester claimed Chambers Prairie.

In 1847, Smith built the first cabin near the shore, naming the establishment Smithfield; it was approximately 16 square feet (1.5 m^{2}), located near present-day Capitol Way between State and Olympia Avenues. Smith's cabin was modest: made of split cedar wood, with a chimneyed stone fireplace, one door, three windows, and single room partition. The surrounding 2 acres (8,100 m^{2}) were enclosed for farming vegetables and raising livestock.

On June 5, 1848, Smith was elected to the Oregon Territorial Legislature to represent Lewis County but did not live to take his seat.

On August 30, 1848, Smith suffered an epileptic fit while canoeing near Newmarket and drowned. Epilepsy had previously affected his health. Sylvester, as the surviving member of the partnership, abandoned his claim for Smith's land. Smith's final journal entry is dated August 29, 1848.

== Works ==
- Smith, Levi Lathrop (1952). Tanis, James Robert (ed.). "The Journal of Levi Lathrop Smith 1847-1848". The Pacific Northwest Quarterly. 43 (4). University of Washington: 277–301. ASIN B00KJ143I0. ISSN 0030-8803. JSTOR 40487847. OCLC 28197676. Digital facsimile (PDF) – via Olympia Historical Society

== See also ==
- History of Olympia, Washington
- Edmund Sylvester
