= 1872 North Cascades earthquake =

Earthquake in Washington state, United States

- UTC time: 1872-12-15 05:40
- USGS-ANSS: ComCat
- Local date: December 14, 1872
- Local time: 21:40
- Magnitude: 6.5–7.0 M_{w}
- Epicenter: 47.9°N 120.3°W
- Type: Unknown
- Areas affected: Pacific Northwest
- Max. intensity: MMI VIII (Severe)
- Casualties: None

The 1872 North Cascades earthquake occurred at 9:40 p.m. local time on December 14 in central Washington Territory (now Washington state). A maximum Mercalli intensity of VIII (Severe) was assessed for several locations, though less intense shaking was observed at many other locations in Washington, Oregon, and British Columbia. Some of these intermediate outlying areas reported V (Moderate) to VII (Very strong) shaking, but intensities as high as IV (Light) were reported as far distant as Idaho and Montana. Due to the remote location of the mainshock and a series of strong aftershocks, damage to structures was limited to a few cabins close to the areas of the highest intensity.

Because the earthquake occurred before seismometers were operating in the region, the magnitude of the shock and its location were never precisely determined, but the intensity reports that are available for the event were studied, and various epicenters for the event were proposed based on these limited data. One study presented an estimated M_{w} of 6.5–7.0, with a proposed location on the east side of the Cascade Range near Lake Chelan. The results of a separate study indicated that it may have been a larger event, placing the shock in the North Cascades, just south of the Canada–United States border at Ross Lake.

== Preface ==
The Cascadia subduction zone rarely influences the western portion of Washington state, but the November 1873 M7.3 shock near the California–Oregon border may have been associated with it. Although activity in the Pacific Northwest (especially west of the Cascades in Washington) has occasionally been located near the subduction zone, earthquakes there (1949 Olympia, 1965 Puget Sound, 2001 Nisqually) have mostly been intraslab events. A large M7 earthquake on the Seattle Fault in 900 C.E. may have generated a tsunami in Puget Sound. The 1872 event east of the Cascades is not understood well due to the lack of instrumental records and reliable felt intensity reports.

== Earthquake ==
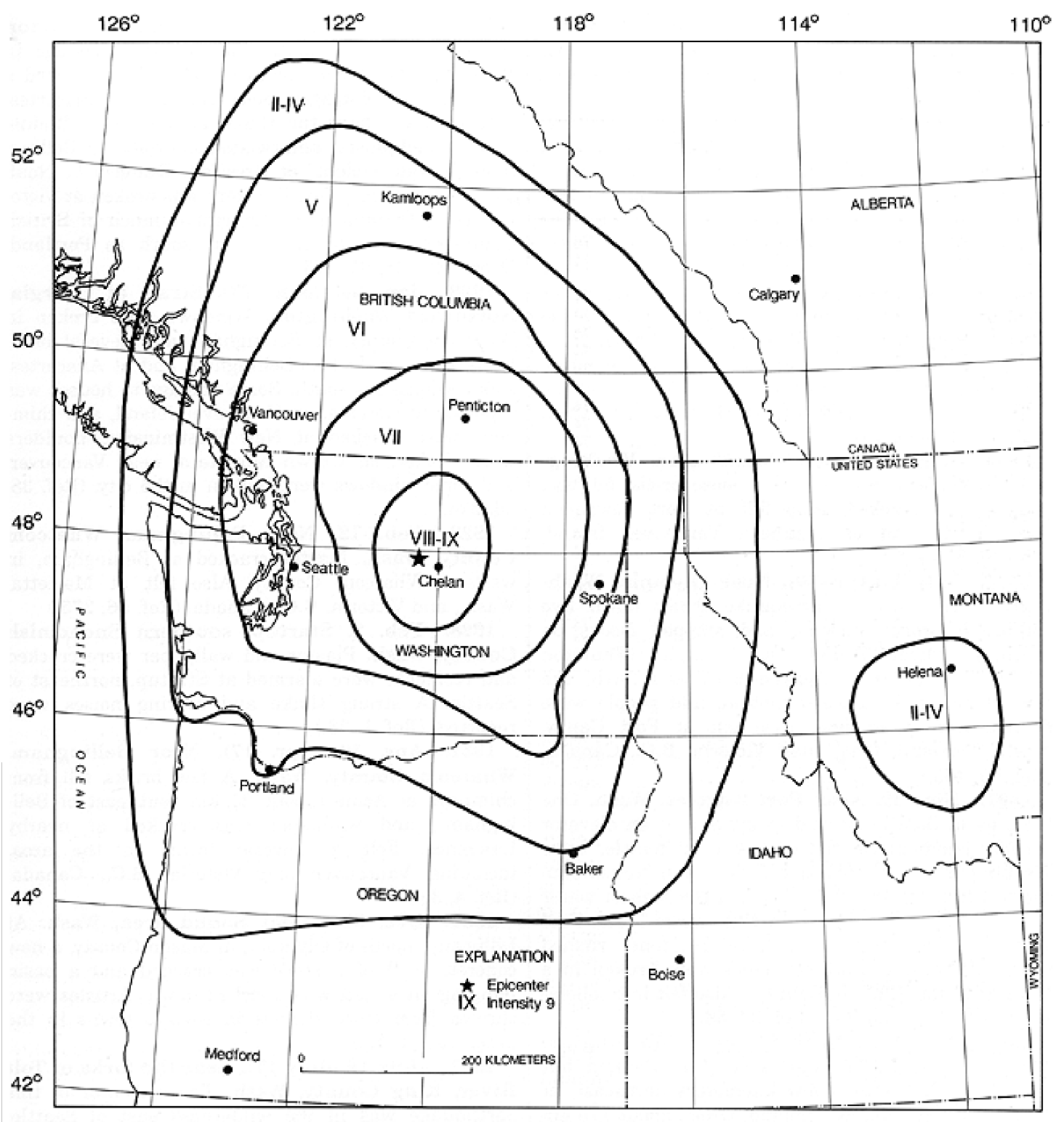
Isoseismal map for the event

As there were only six seismometers operating in Washington state and western British Columbia even as late as 1969, there are insufficient instrumental records for older events in the region. Focal depths are unknown for shocks that occurred before that time, but seismologists Bakun et al. concluded that the event occurred on a shallow fault on the east side of the Cascade Range. They employed a method that was developed by W. H. Bakun and C. M. Wentworth for using earthquake intensity information that could be mapped to a corresponding moment magnitude. The intensities for twelve 20th-century Pacific Northwest earthquakes were used for calibration before analyzing the known intensities for the 1872 event in an attempt to resolve the location and magnitude. The reports were interpreted in a way that placed the epicenter near the south end of Lake Chelan, but other considerations left other plausible focal points both north and northeast of the lake. The magnitude was estimated to be 6.5–7.0 with 95% confidence.

Using a similar strategy, S. D. Malone and S. Bor analyzed the known intensities for the 1872 shock, then compared intensity patterns for a number of instrumentally recorded earthquakes that also occurred in the Pacific Northwest. A factor that was taken into consideration was that for earthquakes that have either circular or slightly elliptical isoseismal maps, the epicenter is usually close to the center of the pattern, but that for shocks where instrumental information are also available, the epicenter is sometimes not where it would have been assumed to be, had only the intensity information (and no instrumental information) been available. An isoseismal map of the 1949 Olympia earthquake was presented as an example of a distorted or convoluted pattern that was attributed to local geological conditions that either attenuated or amplified the seismic waves, and it was emphasized that not taking into account these local features could lead to a misinterpretation of the felt intensities and to a misplaced epicenter.

Malone and Bor ran three simulations, with a projected M7.4 event occurring at a depth of 37 miles (60 km), but took into consideration the differences in attenuation both east and west of the Cascades. Three exploratory locations were investigated, including the setting at the south end of Lake Chelan that reportedly had significant ground disturbances, their preferred location near Ross Lake, and a third location north of the Canada–United States border that had been proposed much earlier by W. G. Milne. The Ross Lake site was chosen because it most closely matched their isoseismal pattern, but it was not strongly preferred over the Milne site, and the Lake Chelan location was excluded as being the epicenter, due to the regional attenuation characteristics that required a location further to the west. Several depths were investigated, but each had little impact on the isoseismal patterns below intensity VI, and since most northwest earthquakes occur between 25–37 miles (40–60 km) deep, they believe the shock was also near that depth, but did not dismiss the possibility that it was a shallower event.

Sherrod and others, using LiDAR, identified a fault scarp in Spencer Canyon. Subsequent field work determined that this fault scarp most likely is the ground rupture for the 1872 earthquake. LiDAR imaging indicate the fault scarp has a length of 6 km (3.7 mi). Trenching studies revealed a northwest-dipping thrust fault measuring at least 75 km (47 mi) long which last moved between 1856 and 1873 during a single earthquake. The findings estimated the shock at M_{w} 6.7–7.3.

Selected Mercalli intensities
MMI	Locations
MMI VIII (Severe)	Entiat, WA, Wenatchee, WA
MMI VII (Very strong)	Osoyoos Lake, B.C., Chilliwack, B.C.
MMI VI (Strong)	Nicola Valley, B.C., Olympia, WA
MMI V (Moderate)	Astoria, OR, Portland, OR
MMI IV (Light)	Fort Lapwai, ID, Deer Lodge, MT
Bakun et al. 2002, pp. 3256, 3257

=== Damage ===
Though the earthquake was felt over a very wide area (from the Pacific Ocean to Montana, and British Columbia to Oregon) the area that was most affected was largely unpopulated, and very few homes existed. A log building that was built on unconsolidated river sediment close to the mouth of the Wenatchee River had dislodged roof logs, and the kitchen became detached from the rest of the structure. Another log cabin between Entiat and Winesap also had roof damage. Mercalli intensities as high as VI (Strong) reached the western portion of the state, near the highly populated Puget Sound region, and to the southeast beyond where the Hanford nuclear reactor site later stood.

=== Aftershocks ===
A relationship exists between the depth of the mainshock and the occurrence of aftershocks, and several Pacific Northwest earthquakes illustrate this link, like the February 1981 M5.5 Elk Lake event in southwest Washington that was followed by more than 1,000 in the first two years. The M7.3 1959 Hebgen Lake earthquake in Montana had a significant sequence of aftershocks, and the shallow M7 1983 Borah Peak event was followed by four aftershocks. In opposition, the intraslab events (and crustal shocks above the subduction zone) on the west side of the Cascades have had insignificant aftershock sequences, usually amounting to a minimal number of small aftershocks. For example, the 2001 Nisqually shock occurred nearly 18.6 miles (30 km) deep and was followed by only four small aftershocks, and there was a similar procession for the 1946 Vancouver Island earthquake, a M7.6 crustal shock that also had a focal depth near 18.6 miles (30 km).

Aftershocks did follow the 1872 event, and during the initial 24 hours they were strong enough to be felt over a broad area, from Idaho and into southern British Columbia. The intensity of the shocks waned as time passed, and after a year they were still occurring, but were only being felt at Wenatchee, Lake Chelan, and Entiat. Bakun et al. listed the considerable aftershock sequence as a strong indication that the initial event was shallow.

The Entiat area remained seismically active well into the 20th century, leading to speculation that earthquakes were long-lived aftershocks from the 1872 event.

== See also ==
- List of earthquakes in Canada
- List of earthquakes in the United States
- List of earthquakes in Washington
- List of historical earthquakes
- Omak Rock
- Ross Lake Fault
