= Omak (disambiguation) =

Omak is a city located in the foothills of the Okanogan Highland in north-central Washington, United States.

Omak may also refer to:

- Omak Airport, an airport located in Riverside, Washington
- Omak Lake, a lake located in Okanogan County, Washington
- Omak Rock, a balancing rock located in Okanogan County, Washington
- Omakase, a Japanese term defining "to entrust"
- Omakau, a community located in New Zealand
- Omake, a Japanese term defining "extra"
- Omak Apang, Indian politician
