= Tacoma Narrows Bridge (1950) =

Suspension bridge in Washington State

1950 Tacoma Narrows Bridge
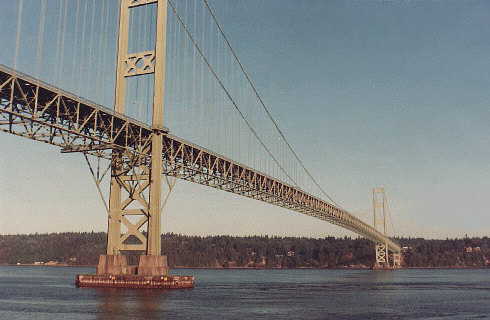
- The 1950 Tacoma Narrows Bridge in 1988
- Coordinates: 47°16′08″N 122°33′06″W
- Carries: SR 16 (4 lanes westbound; 2 lanes per direction, 1950–2007)
- Other name(s): Sturdy Gertie, Westbound Tacoma Narrows Bridge
- Maintained by: Washington State Department of Transportation

Characteristics
- Design: Suspension
- Total length: 5,979 feet (1,822.4 m)
- Longest span: 2,800 feet (853.4 m) (side spans 1,100 feet (335.3 m))
- Clearance above: 186.4 feet (56.8 m)
- Clearance below: 195 feet (59.4 m)

History
- Opened: October 14, 1950; 75 years ago

Location
- Interactive map of 1950 Tacoma Narrows Bridge

The 1950 Tacoma Narrows Bridge is a suspension bridge in the U.S. state of Washington that carries the westbound lanes of Washington State Route 16 (known as Primary State Highway 14 until 1964) across the Tacoma Narrows strait, between the city of Tacoma and the Kitsap Peninsula. Opened on October 14, 1950, it was built in the same location as the original Tacoma Narrows Bridge, which collapsed due to a windstorm on November 7, 1940. It is the older of the twin bridges that make up the Tacoma Narrows Bridge crossing of the Tacoma Narrows, and carried both directions of traffic across the strait until 2007. At the time of its construction, the bridge was, like its predecessor, the third-longest suspension bridge in the world in terms of main span length, behind the Golden Gate Bridge and George Washington Bridge; it is now the 46th-longest suspension bridge in the world.

Design work on a new Tacoma Narrows Bridge began shortly after the collapse of the original bridge. However, several engineering issues, the demand on steel created by the United States' involvement in World War II, and the state of Washington's inability to find an insurer, all pushed the start of construction to April 1948. The new bridge was designed with a wider deck and taller and wider towers than its predecessor, and addressed the wind issues that led to the original bridge's collapse. It opened to the public on October 14, 1950, and carried both directions of Primary State Highway 14 for over 40 years. Tolls were charged on the bridge until 1965, when the bonds were retired 13 years ahead of schedule. “The price tag for construction -- $11.2 million -- was one-third more than the Toll Bridge Authority estimated. The final construction cost estimate, made just prior to the bond issue, reached $13,738,000.”

By 1990, population growth and development on the Kitsap Peninsula caused vehicular traffic on the bridge to exceed its design capacity. In 1998, voters in several Washington counties approved an advisory measure to create a twin bridge to span the Tacoma Narrows. After a series of protests and court battles, construction began on the second span in 2002. The second span opened in July 2007 to carry eastbound traffic, and the 1950 bridge was reconfigured to carry westbound traffic.

== Design ==
The designs for the 1950 Tacoma Narrows Bridge were drawn up not long after the 1940 collapse of its predecessor, which was colloquially known as “Galloping Gertie” because of oscillations in the structure noted during its construction. In July 1941, the Washington Toll Bridge Authority appointed Charles E. Andrew (who had been involved in Gertie's design and construction as a consultant) as principal engineer and chairman of the consulting board in charge of designing a new span across the Narrows. Members of the new design board included Dr. Theodore von Kármán, Glenn Woodruff, and the firm of Sverdrup and Parcel of Chicago, Illinois. To lead the design team, Andrew picked Dexter R. Smith as lead designer and principal architect. As early as October 1941, less than a year after Gertie's collapse, the WTBA had adopted a rough design for a new span. The new design closely resembled the original design for the 1940 span drawn up by Clark Eldridge. The cost of construction on the new design was then estimated at $7 million (US$161 million in present terms).

Since the original bridge became a major asset in the short time it was in service, the U.S. Navy lobbied heavily for a combination highway/railroad span across the Narrows to replace Gertie, and proposed a steel-cantilever-type bridge over a suspension span. However, the extra steel needed to construct such a structure across the Narrows would have added an extra $8.5 million (US$195 million in present terms) to the construction cost, ruling out any possibility of such a structure ever being built.

Furthermore, the proposed design needed new testing. A purely mathematical solution to designing suspension spans was not possible because little was known about the forces that brought down Gertie. In light of that fact, engineers chose to design the replacement, then subject scale mockups of the design in a specially built wind tunnel constructed at the University of Washington. According to Charles Andrew, "The only way to attack the problem, was to design a bridge, then build a model of that design and subject it to wind action." The testing was performed by Professor F. B. Farquharson, who had researched Gertie's motions prior to its collapse on November 7, 1940.

From late 1941 onward, Professor Farquharson (as well as von Karman, who did his work at the California Institute of Technology in Pasadena, California) continued to work on the new bridge design. By 1943, he was working in a specially designed wind tunnel laboratory built on the University of Washington campus in Seattle. The facility was large enough to house a scale model of the completed bridge as long as 100 feet (30 m), plus section models for further testing. After Farquharson confirmed that Gertie collapsed due to its excessive flexibility and the aerodynamic forces as a result of the flexibility in its span, testing was then done on designs drawn by Smith. All of the new designs would feature a deep open stiffening truss instead of a solid plate girder.

Testing on the new bridge design was begun in November 1943 and continued through 1945. The studies included 200 different configurations, to wind forces hitting the span at up to plus-or-minus 45-degrees perpendicular to the deck. Then, testing was performed on a design using open strips of wind grating placed in the roadway, which added even greater stability against torsional movement. A design with bottom lateral bracing on the stiffening truss was also tested to test the resistance against lateral movement. Then, a design was tested with motion damping devices located on the deck at three locations: one at each tower (one at each end of the main span, and one on each side span at the tower), and a set of damping devices at mid-span on each main cable. Each of these steps in the design and testing phase were performed to reduce as much lateral and torsional movement as possible.

After $80,000 (US$1.43 million in present terms) was spent in the design and testing of the new span, the design was completed on December 5, 1945. The WTBA finalized and approved revised designs from Dexter's drawings in December in April 1946, and minor revisions continued on until September. The new span was to have a construction cost of $8.5 million (US$152 million in present terms).

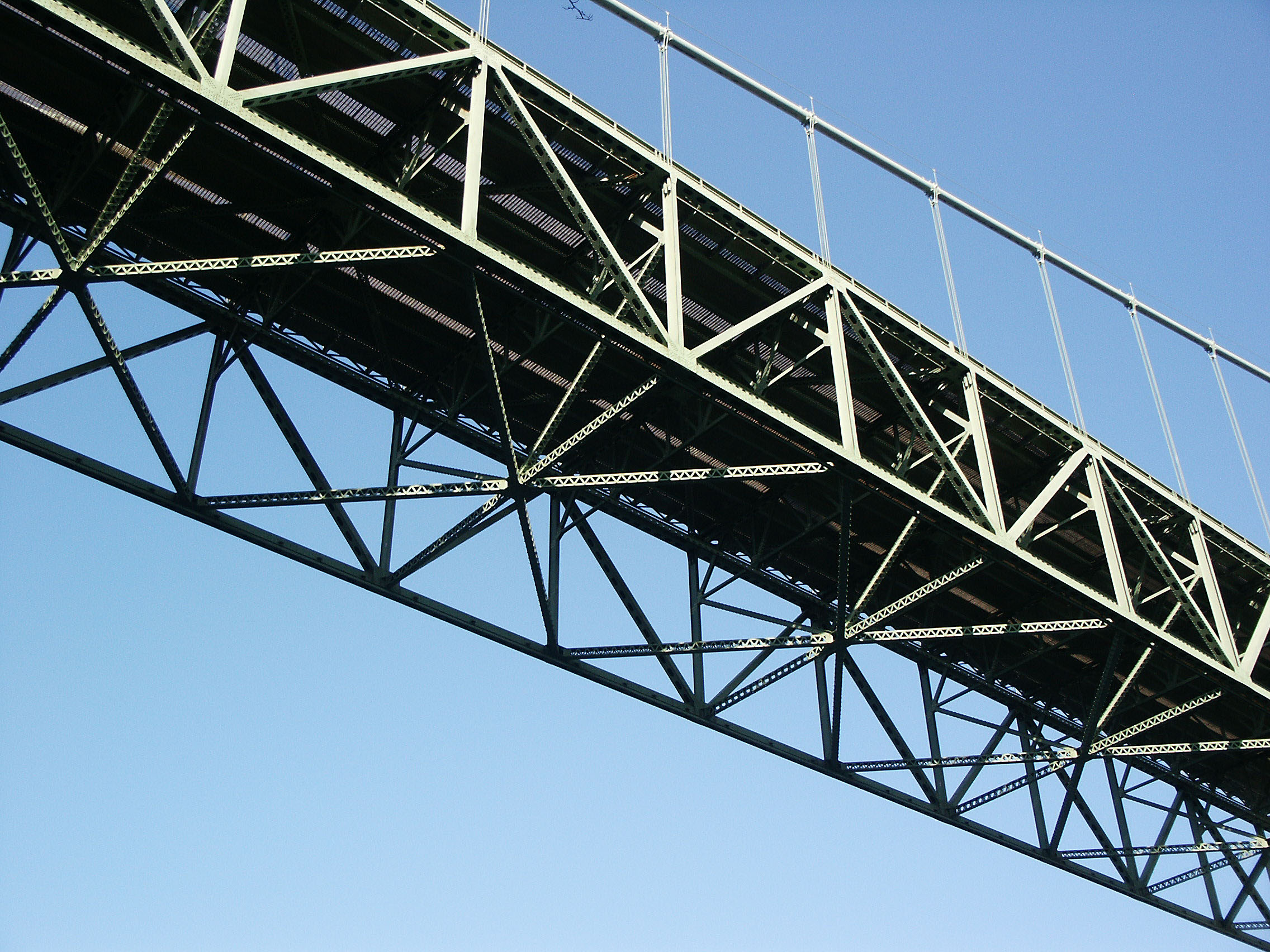
A detailed closeup of the stiffening truss. Photo is of the west side span, photographed from under the 2007 span's west side span on the shore of The Narrows. Photo also illustrates the flow-through wind grating.

The final designs of the Tacoma Narrows Bridge, once finalized, were a sharp and drastic contrast from the design by Leon Moisseiff. Instead of a thin plate girder, an open-air stiffening truss with a depth of 33 feet (10 m) would form the new road deck. Newer, larger towers that rose 58 feet (18 m) higher and 21 feet (6.4 m) wider than Gertie's towers, would support the bridge's main cables, now 20 1/4 inches (510 mm) in diameter versus Gertie's 17 1/2 inches (440 mm). Newer, larger anchor blocks would support a load that weighed 1.6 times as much as the original bridge. However, some elements of Galloping Gertie were incorporated into the 1950 span. The tower pedestals were enlarged and raised 17 feet (5.2 m). On the west end stood a 450-foot (140 m) long approach viaduct with the same 8-foot (2.4 m) deep girders Gertie's main deck had. This approach viaduct used three support towers, two with thin support beams and one with the structural complexity and design of one of Gertie's main towers, each spaced 150 feet (46 m) apart. The viaduct, after a structural examination, was kept and utilized as part of the 1950 bridge's design, with an additional box strut brace added to the tower closest the shoreline (officially known as Tower No. 3 in the design plans), and widening of the upper box strut for the new bridge's deck.

The road deck itself was seen as a major innovation in suspension bridge design. Lanes of traffic on typical suspension bridge roadways are divided by dashed paint lines, a solid strip, or a set of two strips of paint. On the 1950 span's final roadway design, the 46-foot (14 m)-wide roadway was split into four lanes of traffic, each lane being 9 5/8 feet (2.9 m) wide. Each lane was separated by a 3-inch (76 mm) deep, 33-inch-wide (84 cm) open air wind grate. Bordering the outside lanes was a 19-inch (480 mm) open air wind grate that supported a 5-inch (130 mm) pipe curb elevated 1-foot (0.30 m) off the roadway. These also formed the separation between the roadway, and a 3-foot (0.91 m)-wide sidewalk on both sides that was fenced in by a 4-foot-high (1.2 m) railing.

== Construction ==
Constructing the replacement Tacoma Narrows Bridge was delayed for nearly a decade primarily due to the demand on steel created by World War II, and the fact that the state had trouble arranging insurance for the new span. On April 30, 1947, Governor Monrad Wallgren had announced that insurance had finally been arranged. It wasn't until August 1947 that Washington finally requested bids for the construction, and by that time, the price tag for construction went from $8.5 million (US$152 million in present terms) to $11.2 million (US$161 million in present terms). On October 15, the state opened bids for the construction, with Bethlehem Pacific Steel Corporation bidding $8,263,904 (US$119 million in present terms) on construction of the superstructure, and John A. Roebling's Sons Company of San Francisco bidding $2,932,681 (US$42.3 million in present terms) for the construction of the suspension cable system.

After several delays involving final financing, the WTBA finally offered a $14 million (US$202 million in present terms) bond that was to be repaid via tolls on the bridge, as well as Pierce County offering a $1.5 million (US$21.6 million in present terms) bond guarantee fund. On March 12, 1948, the state finally completed bond financing. And after steel became more readily available, the puzzle pieces began falling together in rapid fashion. The construction contracts were finally awarded on March 31, and April 1, and by April 9, earth moving began at the remains of Gertie's east cable anchorage.

=== Anchorages ===
Since the replacement span was going to be 1.6 times heavier than the bridge it replaced, as well as four lanes instead of two, modification and partial demolition was necessary to begin construction on the newer, and much more massive, cable anchorages at each end of the bridge. The center of the old anchorages were kept as cores, and a newer eyebar system set at 60 feet (18 m) apart (versus 39 feet [12 m] for the previous bridge) were constructed. They would support a much larger cable load from the original 28 million pounds (13 kt) to a much heavier 36 million pounds (16 kt), and consisted of steel eyebars 62 feet (19 m) long, with 26-inch (660 mm) diameter shoes, embedded into new concrete. Each new anchor would weigh 54,000 short tons (49,000 t) and would be embedded deep into compacted soil. Construction of the new cable anchorages was started during the summer of 1948 and continued into 1949.

=== Tower pedestals ===
Due to the 150-foot (46 m) water depth of the narrows, the Tower Pedestals are each the size of a 20-story office building, with an overall size of 130 by 80 by 225 feet (40 m × 24 m × 69 m), on which rest the 510-foot-tall (160 m) towers. They are designed to withstand daily 7-knot (13 km/h; 8.1 mph) currents and a twice-daily 15-foot (4.6 m) tidal swing. Each tower pedestal used 34,000 cubic yards (26,000 m^{3}) of concrete for construction.

The tower pedestals had creosote timber fenders, which were installed in 1948 to deflect marine debris and traffic, which were removed sometime between 1995 and 2000.

The tower pedestals that supported Gertie's towers were found to be structurally sound and unharmed after the failure of that span, and were reused for the current bridge. The towers of the 1940 span in their short service time experienced corrosion from salt water spray at their bases, so engineers constructed new tops to the pedestals, at the same time the anchorages were being built, to allow for tower construction to begin in near unison. The new tower pedestals (called piers in the designs) were raised 17 feet (5.2 m) to prevent the corrosion issue, and were enlarged where the towers would stand to provide more structural rigidity. The east and west piers were completed in mid-December 1948.

=== Towers ===
The original towers for the 1940 Tacoma Narrows Bridge featured four deep, box-shaped struts (two below the roadway and two above), as well as being tapered from being 50 feet (15 m) wide at the base to 39 feet (12 m) at the top. The new towers of the replacement span were to be the same width both at the bottom and the top, and were to feature a deep X-bracing system with three 45-foot-deep (14 m) single X-brace struts below the road deck and a series of three double-X brace struts of varying depths above the roadway (top being 23 ft 5 in (7.14 m), middle being 24 ft 6 in (7.47 m), and the bottom being 26 ft 6 in (8.08 m)). Tower construction began January 1, 1949, and progressed rapidly. Work went ahead of schedule and by April 1949, the 21-short-ton (19 t) steel cable saddles were prepared for lifting. On April 13, 1949, the north cable saddle on the east tower was bolted into place on a set of shims to allow workers to rivet the top plate into place. Then, disaster struck. That morning, an earthquake measuring 7.1 rattled the Puget Sound region. The earthquake caused the towers to sway 6 feet (1.8 m) from vertical, causing the cable saddle to shear its bolts and fall off the tower. The saddle fell 510 feet (160 m) below. It missed the pedestal, and plunged straight through a barge, to a final resting spot 135 feet (41 m) below the surface of the Narrows, 75 feet (23 m) away from the pedestal. The resulting impact sank the barge, taking a compressor and numerous other tools with it. Divers soon located the cable saddle in a deep hole during a slack tide (the only time divers could operate, and slack tides only occurred at night). After a three-day delay, it was raised to the surface, repaired (the impact bent a corner on it), and reinstalled. The earthquake delayed completion of both the east and west towers on the bridge. After the earthquake's aftershocks subsided, work resumed, and by July 17 both towers were announced as being completed.

=== Cables ===
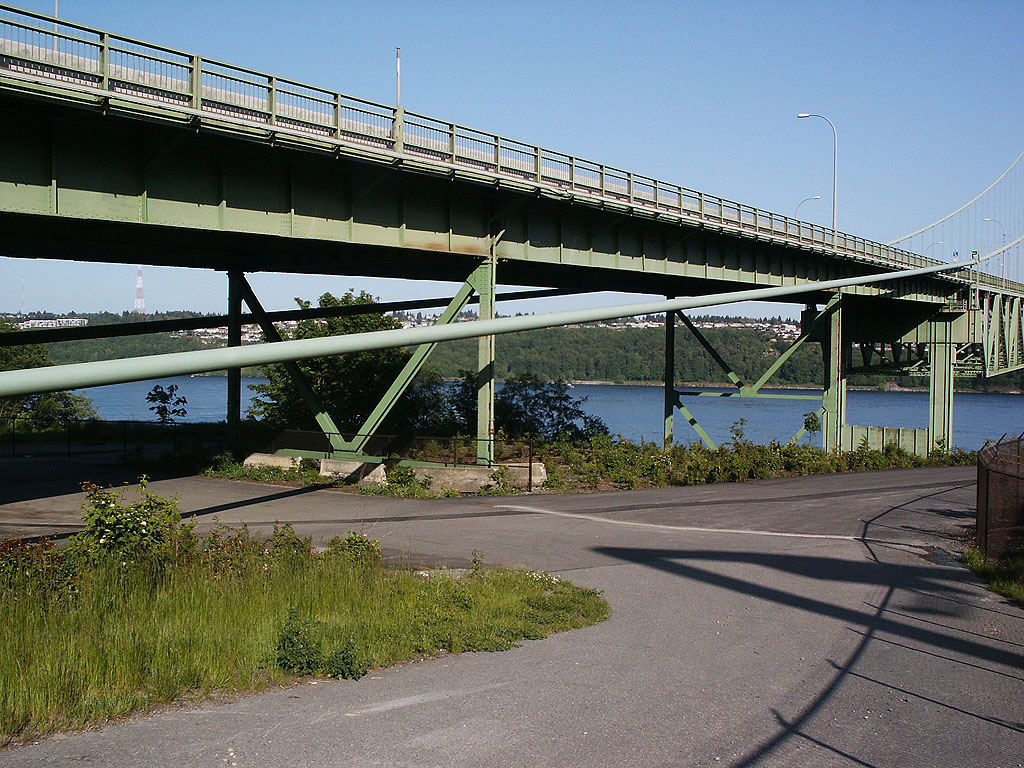
The 450-foot (140 m)-long west approach viaduct. Tower #3 (far right; closest to the suspended structure) extends to the shoreline. Was originally part of Galloping Gertie

Construction of the main cables began by erecting their 10-foot (3.0 m) wide catwalks in July. On July 17, 1949, the first catwalk line was towed via tugboat across the Narrows, then lifted onto the towers. The catwalks, consisting of 1-inch-diameter (2.5 cm) wire base cables, cyclone-wire fencing, and a 4-foot (1.2 m) center section of wood slats, were erected in 200-foot (61 m) sections. On September 15, the catwalks were completed and the spinning gear was in place. Harold Hills, a field engineer for Roebling's Sons Company, became the first man to cross the Narrows via the catwalks. On the following day, Harry Cornelius, an inspector for the WTBA became the second to cross the Narrows on the catwalks.

To begin preparations for spinning the main cables, Roebling's Sons had set up a reeling plant on the Tacoma tidal flats. 100,000,000 feet (30,000,000 m) of galvanized steel wire, the total amount needed for both main cables, began arriving in 350 pounds (160 kg) coils. Shipped in from Trenton, New Jersey, these coils were then transferred to intermediate reels, then wound onto a final reel of steel wire that held it at uniform tension. Each 8-foot (2.4 m) diameter reel of wire weighed 9 short tons (8.2 t), and contained 36 miles (58 km) of wire.

On October 13, the guide wires for cable operations were installed, and cable spinning operations began. Nineteen cable strands, each carrying 458 number 6-gauge steel wire comprised the main suspension cables (a total of 8,705 per cable). The first strand to be completed was a cable strand on the north cable, on October 26. Working three shifts 24 hours per day, Roebling's Sons were delayed a few times due to weather and high winds. On January 16, 1950, amidst one of the worst winters in local record, workers completed the main cables. Cable band placement and vertical suspender cable installation was complete by March 7, and deck construction began almost immediately.

=== Stiffening truss ===
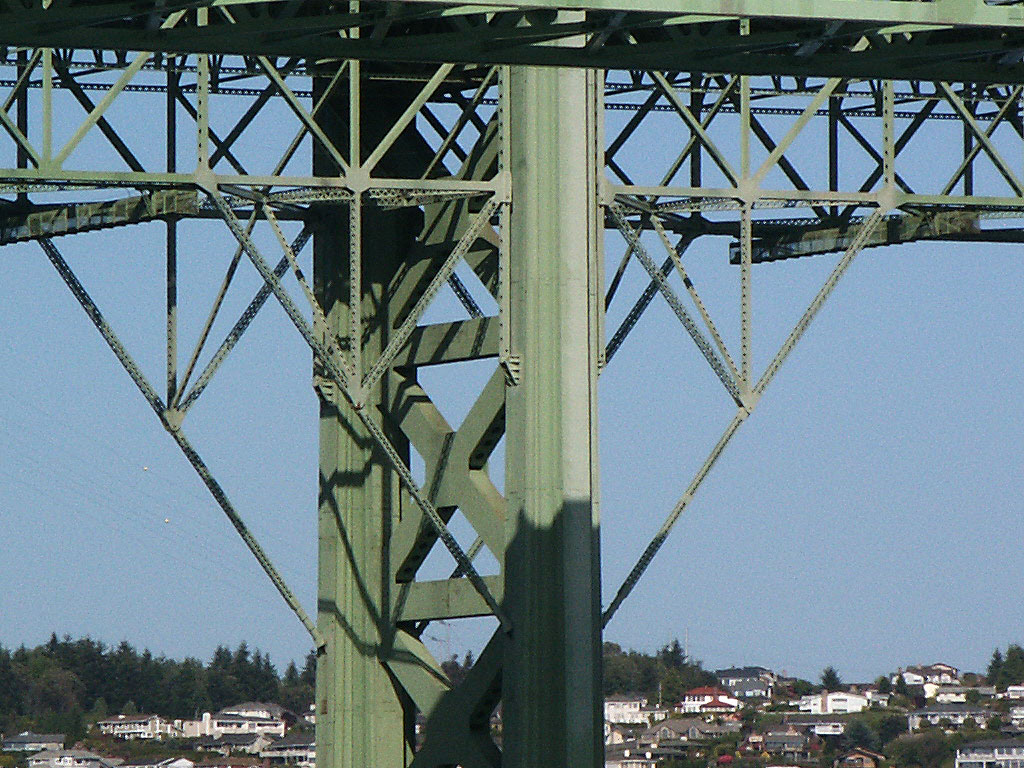
The stiffening truss damping mechanism at the towers. The hydraulic shock damping mechanisms themselves are seen as small cylinders where the diagonal bracing meets the towers (each one is 2 feet (0.61 m) in diameter and 4 feet (1.2 m) long).

Construction of the new road deck and stiffening truss of the 1950 span was conducted differently than had been done in Gertie's case. In 1940, the road deck was prefabricated in 100-foot-long (30 m) sections on the Tacoma tidal flats, then barged to the site via tugboats and hoisted into place via gantry cranes installed on the main cable. When construction of the road deck began in early March, workers installed a Chicago boom high above the roadway level, upon which prefabricated stiffening truss assemblies, each 32 by 60 feet (9.8 by 18.3 m), were hoisted into place. After the deck assemblies were hoisted into place and finished, four traveling derricks were then lifted onto the completed deck sections. After the traveling derricks (called "layleg rigs" by the crew) were assembled and readied, the deck was then assembled in a series of steps. On the new bridge, the stiffening truss featured a series of outer members called "chords" that formed the top and bottom of the stiffening truss. These were installed first, then the diagonal and vertical truss members on the sides were installed. Next, an 11-foot-deep (3.4 m) stiffening truss "floor beam" perpendicular to the length of the bridge was installed at intervals of 32 feet (9.8 m) (the distance between suspender cables; they were installed at each vertical beam member in the stiffening truss). These floor beams, each 60 feet (18 m) wide, would form the upper lateral stiffening mechanism in the deck itself. After the floor beams were installed, at alternate floor beam panel points a set of diagonal bracing struts were installed. Then, a series of lateral bracing struts were installed on the top and bottom of the road deck that connected to the outer steel chords. Next, a series of eight 18-inch-deep (46 cm) I-beam "stringers" were installed (positioned longitudinally). This was the final steelwork step involved, and the deck was soon raised 1 foot 6 inches (0.46 m) on each corner to attach the suspender cables and their "jewels" to the vertical stiffening truss members.

Unlike Gertie, whose preassembled deck sections were first raised into place at the center of the main span and the ends of the side spans, on the new bridge the stiffening truss was erected first at each tower, and then progressed outwards. Four work crews, one on each side span and two on the main span (one each side) worked together completing each step in 64-foot (20 m) intervals (completing an average of 128 feet (39 m) of steelwork per day). The side span crews worked towards shore and the main span crews worked towards each other, and by May 1949, work was nearing completion. On May 28, ironworkers installed the closing top chord on the main span, and over the next two days workers finished closing the span up. On June 1, the steel stiffening truss of the road deck was declared complete.

=== Final deckwork and construction ===
Throughout the summer of 1950, as many as 200 men were involved in the final steps of completion of the 1950 Tacoma Narrows Bridge. On July 24, workers from Roebling's Sons were involved in wrapping and caulking the suspender cable bands, and the railings on the sidewalks were being completed. By August 22, the road deck was taking shape, as workers continued concrete pours for the roadway. Painting began that week, as eleven men worked the paint crew sandblasting and painting the stiffening truss. The bridge received its first coat of "Narrows Green" paint - a grayish-green hue (its predecessor had been painted the same color a decade before). By September 30, workers installed the finishing touches on the toll plazas, including installing sheetrock and plumbing. The midspan and tower hydraulic damping mechanisms were also installed, and workers began removing the catwalks, tower buttresses, and other working platforms.

Work also progressed at the west end of the bridge, where workers modified the 450-foot-long (140 m) approach viaduct that once had been a part of the 1940 span for use in the 1950 bridge. There, workers added bracing and brackets that would widen the viaduct from 39 feet (12 m), to accommodate the widened roadway width of 48 feet (15 m).

== Opening and tolled operation ==
The bridge opened to toll-paid traffic on October 14, 1950. The opening day tolls were fifty cents one way per car and driver, and an additional ten cents per passenger. Thousands attended opening day ceremonies, including Governor Arthur B. Langlie. A commemorative pamphlet published by the Tacoma News Tribune was distributed, as well as scores of speeches given. After 30 months of construction, the Narrows was bridged again.

Traffic counts following the opening day ceremonies steadily rose in the first few years, just as they had in the four months Gertie was in service. Five years after the bridge opened, the average count was 4,699 vehicles per day. By 1960, an average of 6,218 vehicles crossed, and in 1965, fifteen years after the bridge opened, the figure from 1960 was doubled. With an average of 11,267 vehicles per day, the Washington Toll Bridge Authority soon removed the tolls. In early 1965, a bill passed the state legislature removing the tolls, and on May 14, 1965, in a ceremony at the toll plaza, Governor Dan Evans signed the legislation that removed the tolls. The tolls were removed 13 years ahead of schedule after the bonds had been paid off; the accrued revenue stood at $19 million (US$254 million in present terms).

== Traffic increases ==
For the first few decades after its opening, traffic congestion was no issue. Off of the west end of the bridge, Highway 16 (until 1964, it was signed as Primary State Highway 14-PT) transformed to a four-lane freeway from a narrow two-lane country highway. By the late 1980s, as developers began constructing housing and shopping mall projects in Gig Harbor, Highway 16 was expanded and realigned from a meandering two-lane country road to a four-lane freeway that stretched from Tacoma to Gorst. As a result, traffic congestion grew enough to where backups began occurring. In 1980, average counts were at 38,973 vehicles per day. In 1990, the figure increased to 66,573, exceeding its designed daily capacity by 6,573. Many of the backups on the bridge occurred on the east end as workers from Tacoma headed towards their homes in Gig Harbor, and those backups would stretch as far as Interstate 5 nearly 6 miles (9.7 km) away. These backups continued to get worse, and by 2000, the average daily count of traffic on the Tacoma Narrows Bridge was 88,000. This prompted the state legislature to call an advisory vote to build a new span across the Narrows. After a series of protests, both inside and outside of the courtroom, it was made official on October 5, 2002, as groundbreaking occurred for the new bridge.

== Lasting legacy on bridge design ==
The failure of the 1940 Tacoma Narrows Bridge, along with the design of the 1950 Tacoma Narrows Bridge, led to a number of firsts in suspension bridge design. The 1950 bridge was the first to be designed and tested in wind tunnels, and was the first suspension bridge designed and built with hydraulic motion damping devices.

== Maintenance, and the bridge today ==
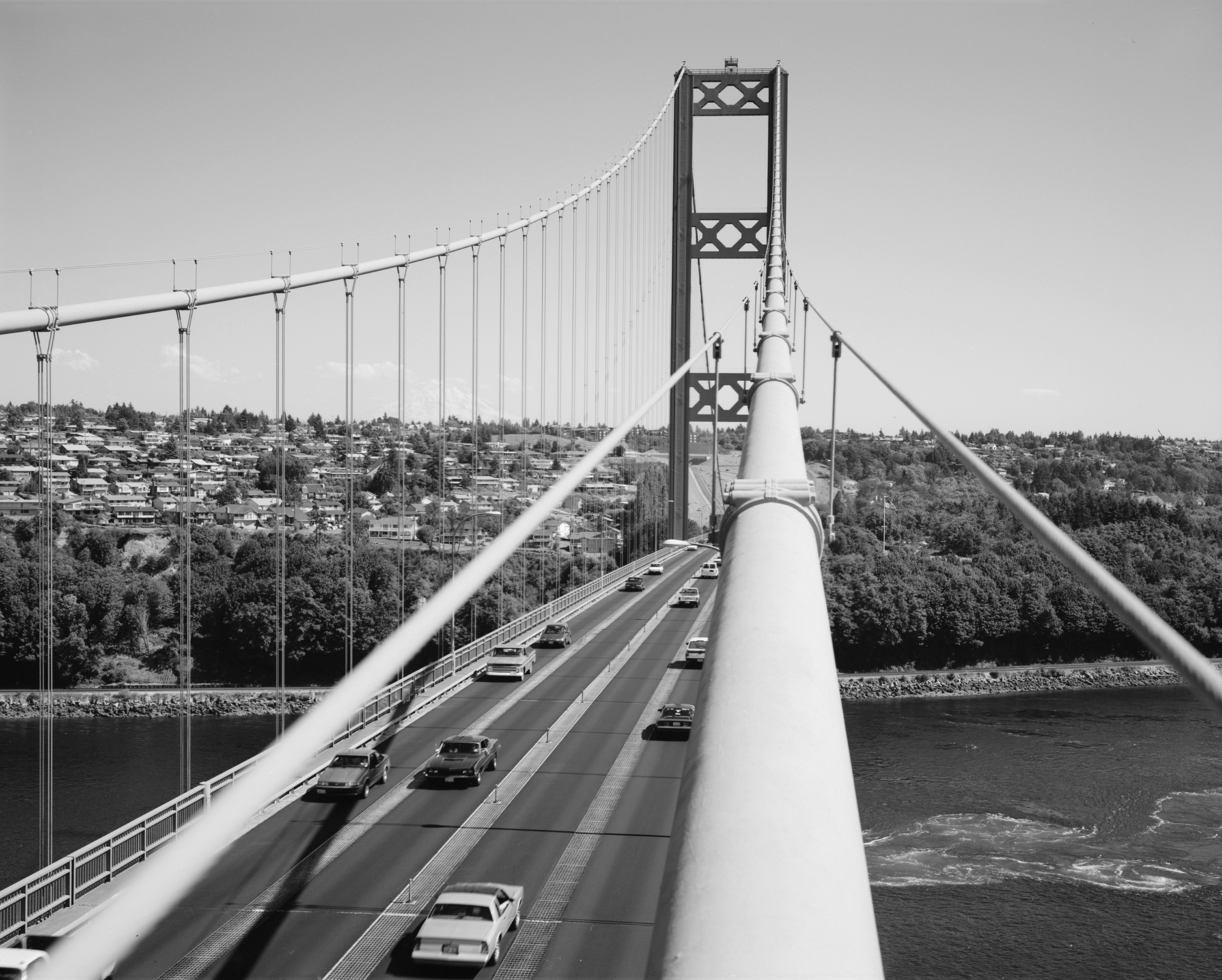
Suspension cables of the 1950 Tacoma Narrows Bridge, 1993

The 1950 Tacoma Narrows Bridge undergoes a rigorous maintenance schedule that is a year-long effort. Maintenance crews often perform replacement of steel parts, and inspect the steel cables and towers at night or at low traffic hours. Painting the bridge is also a drawn-out task. Working only during the summer months, it takes ten years to paint the span. The color of the bridge is officially known as "Narrows Green", a grayish-green hue that was the original color of the ill-fated 1940 span (called Chrome Green in a 1940 newspaper report on the final stages of Gertie's construction).

The bridge has also survived several major earthquakes and severe weather events since its completion. The first earthquake occurred during construction on April 13, 1949, and knocked the north cable's 21-short-ton (19 t) steel saddle from the east tower. Another strong earthquake struck the region on April 29, 1965. In 1999 a series of moderate earthquakes struck the region, and the most recent earthquake is the 2001 Nisqually earthquake. Even though the bridge escaped damage in all of those earthquakes, the 1949 earthquake still has a lasting legacy hold on the span. As a result of the north cable saddle's plunge from the east tower, and resulting three-day stay in 135 feet of salt water, it now corrodes more than twice as fast as its counterparts. During the Hanukkah Eve windstorm of 2006, the bridge was closed for the first time in its operating existence due to heavy winds but reopened approximately 6 hours later; no damage was reported.

On the bridge's 50th anniversary in 2000, a private firm that inspected the span concluded that "it is one of the best for its maintenance and condition" and overall, the Tacoma Narrows Bridge remains one of the best maintained spans in the nation.

Today, the bridge serves as the westbound span over the Narrows.

== Construction deaths ==
As with its predecessor, construction deaths occurred while building the 1950 span. The first was on May 24, 1948.

Robert E. Drake, who had been employed by the Woodworth Company was busy with a group of men doing cable work at the west anchorage. His death was due to the breaking of a cable on a derrick, which sent the boom directly on top of him. The second death, on April 7, 1950, was that of 36-year-old ironworker Lawrence S. Gale. His death was due to a temporary weld failure at a lower chord cross strut at panel 33. It was Gale's first day on the job building the stiffening truss work, and he had noticed a weld that didn't look right. He was going to repair the weld, when it broke. He plunged 120 feet (37 m) into the Narrows, along with 40 short tons (36 t) of steel. A memorial was held on a scow.

On June 6, 1950, workers were installing temporary wooden timbers for the concrete trucks pouring the deck. One worker stepped out to walk on a fresh stretch of timbers, and missed. Workers recalled hearing his impact with the water below sounding like an artillery piece going off.

A welder, Ray Bradley was working with a crew of men installing an expansion joint on July 31, 1950. That day, it was raining heavily and Ray had reached down to grab the wire lead for a welding machine. According to the Pierce County Coroner's report, he suffered a heart attack, although bridgemen believed his death was the result of electrocution.

== See also ==
- List of bridges documented by the Historic American Engineering Record in Washington (state)
- Suspension bridge
- Tacoma Narrows Bridge
- Tacoma Narrows Bridge (1940)
- Vincent Thomas Bridge a similar design in California

== Bibliography ==
- Bridging the Narrows, Joe Gotchy (1990), Gig Harbor Peninsula Historical Society, (ISBN 0-9626048-1-X)
- Catastrophe to Triumph: The Bridges of the Tacoma Narrows. Richard S. Hobbs (2006) WSU Press. (ISBN 0-87422-289-3)
- Masters of Suspension: The men and women who bridged the Tacoma Narrows again. Rob Carson/Dean J. Koepfler (2007) The News Tribune (ISBN 978-0-9633035-2-3)
