= Pacific Northwest Seismic Network =

The Pacific Northwest Seismic Network, or PNSN, collects and studies ground motions from about 400 seismometers in the U.S. states of Oregon and Washington. PNSN monitors volcanic and tectonic activity, gives advice and information to the public and policy makers, and works to mitigate earthquake hazard.

== Motivation ==
Damaging earthquakes are well known in the Pacific Northwest, including several larger than magnitude 7, most notably the M9 1700 Cascadia earthquake and the M7.0–7.3 earthquake in about 900AD on the Seattle Fault. The M6.5 1965 Puget Sound earthquake shook the Seattle, Washington, area, causing substantial damage and seven deaths. This event spurred the installation of the Pacific Northwest Seismic Network in 1969 to monitor regional earthquake activity. Early in 1980 PNSN scientists detected unrest under Mt. St. Helens and by March 1980 predicted an eruption was likely to occur "soon". On March 27 the first steam and ash explosion occurred. The PNSN expanded to better monitor Mt. St. Helens and other Cascade Volcanos leading up to the deadly May 18 eruption and in the years following.

== Observations and efficacy ==
Earthquakes are recorded frequently beneath Mount St. Helens, Mount Rainier, and Mount Hood. After successfully using seismic activity to predict the 1980 Mt. St. Helens eruption, monitoring was expanded to other Cascade Mountains volcanoes. The PNSN, in conjunction with the Cascades Volcano Observatory of the USGS, now monitors seismicity at all the Cascade volcanoes in Washington and Oregon.

The network was significantly expanded after the damaging 2001 Nisqually earthquake. After an earthquake on January 30, 2009, the network's emergency notification system failed. A magnitude 4.3 earthquake in February 2015 showed that the present architecture of the network results in a significant delay in the early warning notification program, depending upon the location of the quake, leading to proposals to again expand the network. The early warning notification program was implemented with its reliability contingent upon unknown future funding, but with the election of Donald Trump "future funding is uncertain" according to Washington Congressman Derek Kilmer. The president's budget for the fiscal year commencing October 1, 2018, calls for reductions in funding and staff for the early warning notification program.

== Operations and data archiving ==
The network operates from the Earth and Space Sciences Department at the University of Washington in Seattle, and its data archiving is at the Data Management Center of the IRIS Consortium in Seattle. The network is also affiliated with the University of Oregon Department of Geology. It is the second largest of the regional seismic networks in the ANSS (Advanced National Seismic System) and has produced more data than the networks in the states of Alaska, Utah, Nevada, Hawaii and the New Madrid, Missouri-Tennessee-Kentucky-Arkansas area.

The network is funded primarily by the United States Geological Survey, which stations its own staff on the campus, and the network is managed by UW staff. Additional funding is provided by the Department of Energy, the State of Washington, and the State of Oregon.
