= Spencer Canyon fault =

Seismic fault in Washington state, USA

- Location within Washington (state)
- Etymology: Spencer Canyon (Columbia River)
- Coordinates: 47.630°N 120.262°W
- Country: United States
- Region: Chelan County, Central Washington
- State: Washington

Characteristics
- Range: North Cascades
- Length: 55 km (34 mi)

Tectonics
- Plate: North American
- Status: Active
- Earthquakes: 1872 North Cascades earthquake
- Type: Thrust

The Spencer Canyon fault is an active seismic fault in central Washington state. Discovered in 2014, it was identified following a multi-year investigation into the source of the 1872 North Cascades earthquake, which was widely felt across the Pacific Northwest. In 2015, researchers who reported the discovery of the fault also identified the epicenter of the 1872 earthquake near the town of Chelan.
