= Tacoma Narrows Bridge (1940) =

Failed suspension bridge in Washington, US

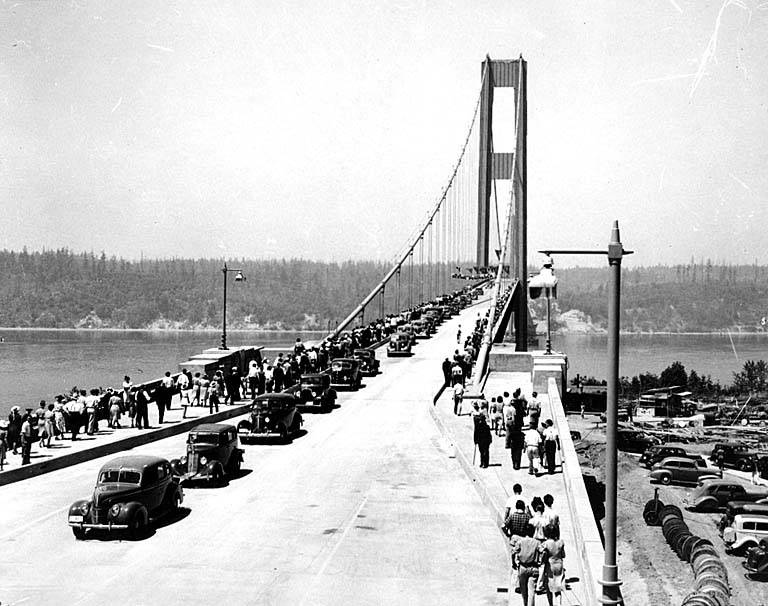
- The original Tacoma Narrows Bridge on its opening day on July 1, 1940
- Coordinates: 47°16′N 122°33′W
- Other name: Galloping Gertie

Characteristics
- Design: Suspension
- Material: Carbon steel
- Total length: 5,939 feet (1,810.2 m)
- Longest span: 2,800 feet (853.4 m)
- Clearance below: 195 feet (59.4 m)
- No. of lanes: 2

History
- Designer: Leon Moisseiff
- Construction start: November 23, 1938
- Opened: July 1, 1940
- Collapsed: November 7, 1940
- Replaced by: Tacoma Narrows Bridge (1950)

Location
- Interactive map of Tacoma Narrows Bridge

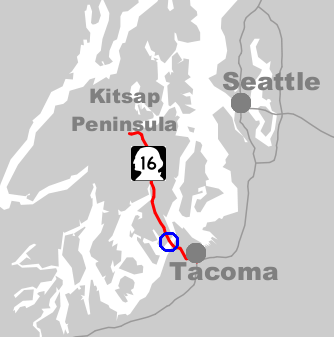
Map showing location of the bridge

The 1940 Tacoma Narrows Bridge, the first bridge at this location, was a suspension bridge in the U.S. state of Washington that spanned the Tacoma Narrows strait of Puget Sound between Tacoma and the Kitsap Peninsula. It opened to traffic on July 1, 1940, and dramatically collapsed into Puget Sound on November 7 of the same year. The bridge's collapse has been described as "spectacular" and in subsequent decades "has attracted the attention of engineers, physicists, and mathematicians". Throughout its short existence, it was the world's third-longest suspension bridge by main span, behind the Golden Gate Bridge and the George Washington Bridge.

Construction began in September 1938. From the time the deck was built, it began to move vertically in windy conditions, so construction workers nicknamed the bridge "Galloping Gertie". The motion continued after the bridge opened to the public, despite several damping measures. The bridge's main span finally collapsed in 40-mile-per-hour (64 km/h) winds on the morning of November 7, 1940, as the deck oscillated in an alternating twisting motion that gradually increased in amplitude until the deck tore apart. The violent swaying and eventual collapse resulted in the death of a Cocker Spaniel named "Tubby", as well as inflicting injuries on people fleeing the disintegrating bridge or attempting to rescue the stranded dog.

Efforts to replace the bridge were delayed by US involvement in World War II, as well as engineering and finance issues, but in 1950, a new Tacoma Narrows Bridge opened in the same location, using the original bridge's tower pedestals and cable anchorages. The portion of the bridge that fell into the water now serves as an artificial reef.

The bridge's collapse had a lasting effect on science and engineering. In many physics textbooks, the event is presented as an example of elementary forced mechanical resonance, but it was more complicated in reality; the bridge collapsed because moderate winds produced aeroelastic flutter that was self-exciting and unbounded: for any constant sustained wind speed above about 35 mph (56 km/h), the amplitude of the (torsional) flutter oscillation would continuously increase, with a negative damping factor, i.e., a reinforcing effect, opposite to damping. The collapse boosted research into bridge aerodynamics-aeroelastics, which has influenced the designs of all later long-span bridges.

== Design and construction ==
Proposals for a bridge between Tacoma and the Kitsap Peninsula date at least to the Northern Pacific Railway's 1889 trestle proposal, but concerted efforts began in the mid-1920s. The Tacoma Chamber of Commerce began campaigning and funding studies in 1923. Several noted bridge engineers were consulted, including Joseph B. Strauss, who went on to be chief engineer of the Golden Gate Bridge, and David B. Steinman, later the designer of the Mackinac Bridge. Steinman made several Chamber-funded visits and presented a preliminary proposal in 1929, but by 1931 the Chamber had cancelled the agreement because Steinman was not working hard enough to obtain financing. At the 1938 meeting of the structural division of the American Society of Civil Engineers, during the construction of the bridge, with its designer in the audience, Steinman predicted its failure.

In 1937, the Washington State legislature created the Washington State Toll Bridge Authority and appropriated $5,000 (equivalent to $106,000 today) to study the request by Tacoma and Pierce County for a bridge over the Narrows.

From the start, financing of the bridge was a problem: Revenue from the proposed tolls would not be enough to cover construction costs; another expense was buying out the ferry contract from a private firm running services on the Narrows at the time. Nonetheless, there was strong support for the bridge from the United States Navy, which operated the Puget Sound Naval Shipyard in Bremerton, and from the United States Army, which ran McChord Field and Fort Lewis near Tacoma.

Washington State engineer Clark Eldridge produced a preliminary tried-and-true conventional suspension bridge design, and the Washington State Toll Bridge Authority requested $11 million (equivalent to $233 million today) from the federal Public Works Administration (PWA). Preliminary construction plans by the Washington Department of Highways had called for a set of 25-foot-deep (7.6 m) trusses to sit beneath the roadway and stiffen it.

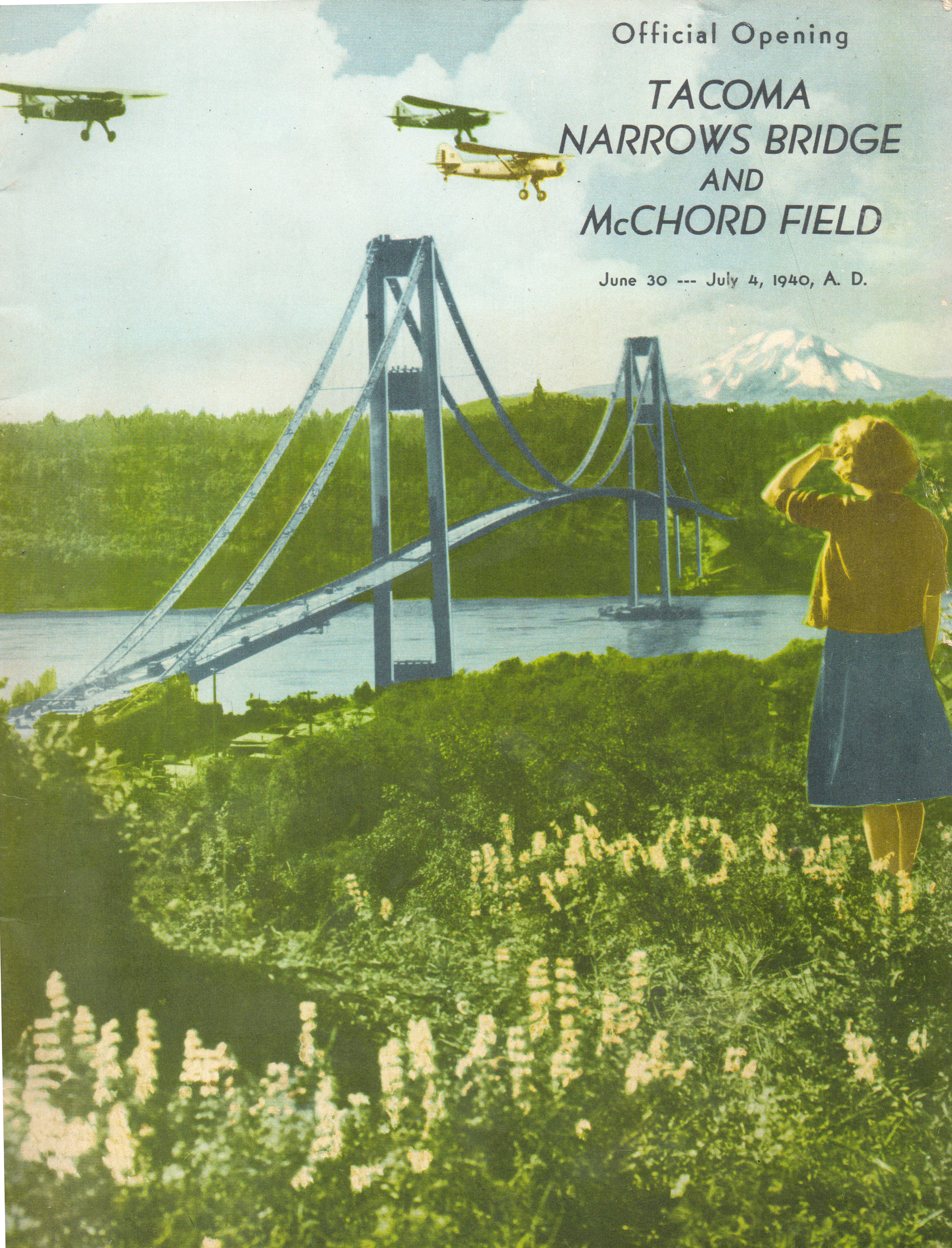
Program for the opening of the Tacoma Narrows Bridge, June 30, 1940

However, "Eastern consulting engineers" — by which Eldridge meant Leon Moisseiff, the noted New York bridge engineer who served as designer and consultant engineer for the Golden Gate Bridge — petitioned the PWA and the Reconstruction Finance Corporation (RFC) to build the bridge for less. Moisseiff and Frederick Lienhard, the latter an engineer with what was then known in New York as the Port Authority, had published a paper that was probably the most important theoretical advance in the bridge engineering field of the decade.

Their theory of elastic distribution extended the deflection theory that was originally devised by the Austrian engineer Josef Melan to horizontal bending under static wind load. They showed that the stiffness of the main cables (via the suspenders) would absorb up to one-half of the static wind pressure pushing a suspended structure laterally. This energy would then be transmitted to the anchorages and towers. Using this theory, Moisseiff argued for stiffening the bridge with a set of eight-foot-deep (2.4 m) plate girders rather than the 25-foot-deep (7.6 m) trusses proposed by the Washington State Toll Bridge Authority. This approach meant a slimmer, more elegant design, and also reduced the construction costs as compared with the Highway Department's design proposed by Eldridge. Moisseiff's design won out, inasmuch as the other proposal was considered to be too expensive. On June 23, 1938, the PWA approved nearly $6 million (equivalent to $137.2 million today) for the Tacoma Narrows Bridge. Another $1.6 million ($36.6 million today) was to be collected from tolls to cover the estimated total $8 million cost ($183.0 million today).

Following Moisseiff's design, bridge construction began on November 23, 1938. Construction took only nineteen months, at a cost of $6.4 million ($146.4 million today), which was financed by the grant from the PWA and a loan from the RFC.

The Tacoma Narrows Bridge, with a main span of 2,800 feet (850 m), was the third-longest suspension bridge in the world at that time, following the George Washington Bridge between New Jersey and New York City, and the Golden Gate Bridge, connecting San Francisco with Marin County to its north.

Because planners expected fairly light traffic volumes, the bridge was designed with two lanes, and it was just 39 feet (12 m) wide. This was quite narrow, especially in comparison with its length. With only the 8-foot-deep (2.4 m) plate girders providing additional depth, the bridge's roadway section was also shallow.

The decision to use such shallow and narrow girders proved the bridge's undoing. With such minimal girders, the deck of the bridge was insufficiently rigid and was easily moved about by winds; from the start, the bridge became infamous for its movement. A mild to moderate wind could cause alternate halves of the centre span to visibly rise and fall several feet over four- to five-second intervals. This flexibility was experienced by the builders and workmen during construction, which led some of the workers to christen the bridge "Galloping Gertie". The nickname soon stuck, and even the public (when the toll-paid traffic started) felt these motions on the day that the bridge opened on July 1, 1940.

== Attempt to control structural vibration ==
Since the structure experienced considerable vertical oscillations while it was still under construction, several strategies were used to reduce the motion of the bridge. They included:

- attachment of tie-down cables to the plate girders, which were anchored to 50-ton concrete blocks on the shore. This measure proved ineffective, as the cables snapped shortly after installation.
- addition of a pair of inclined cable stays that connected the main cables to the bridge deck at mid-span. These remained in place until the collapse but were also ineffective at reducing the oscillations.
- Finally, the structure was equipped with hydraulic buffers installed between the towers and the floor system of the deck to damp longitudinal motion of the main span. The effectiveness of the hydraulic dampers was nullified, however, because the seals of the units were damaged when the bridge was sand-blasted before being painted.

The Washington State Toll Bridge Authority hired Frederick Burt Farquharson, an engineering professor at the University of Washington, to make wind tunnel tests and recommend solutions to reduce the oscillations of the bridge. Farquharson and his students built a 1:200-scale model of the bridge and a 1:20-scale model of a section of the deck. The first studies concluded on November 2, 1940—five days before the bridge collapse on November 7. He proposed two solutions:

- To drill holes in the lateral girders and along the deck so that the airflow could circulate through them (in this way reducing lift forces).
- To give a more aerodynamic shape to the transverse section of the deck by adding fairings or deflector vanes along the deck, attached to the girder fascia.

The first option was not favored, because of its irreversible nature. The second option was the chosen one, but it was not carried out, because the bridge collapsed five days after the studies were concluded.

== Collapse ==
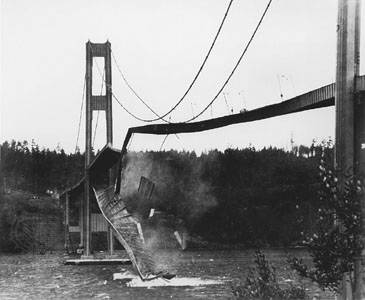
The main bridge span falling into the strait on November 7, 1940

On November 7, 1940, at around 9:45 a.m. PST, especially strong winds caused the bridge to sway wildly from side to side. At least two vehicles were on the bridge at the time – a delivery truck driven by Ruby Jacox and Arthur Hagen, employees of Rapid Transfer Company, and a vehicle driven by Leonard Coatsworth, editor at The News Tribune. The truck tipped over due to the swaying, while the car lost control and began to slide from side to side. Jacox, Hagen, and Coatsworth exited their respective vehicles and got off of the bridge on foot. Coatsworth's daughter's dog Tubby, with only three legs, was left inside the car.

Coatsworth later described his experience.

Around me I could hear concrete cracking. I started back to the car to get the dog, but was thrown before I could reach it. The car itself began to slide from side to side on the roadway. I decided the bridge was breaking up and my only hope was to get back to shore. On hands and knees most of the time, I crawled 500 yards [1,500 ft; 460 m] or more to the towers ... My breath was coming in gasps; my knees were raw and bleeding, my hands bruised and swollen from gripping the concrete curb ... Towards the last, I risked rising to my feet and running a few yards at a time ... Safely back at the toll plaza, I saw the bridge in its final collapse and saw my car plunge into the Narrows.

Traffic was stopped to prevent additional vehicles from entering the bridge. Howard Clifford, a photographer for the Tacoma News Tribune, walked onto the bridge to try to save Tubby, but was forced to turn back when the span began to break apart in the center. At approximately 11:00 a.m., the bridge collapsed into the strait.

Coatsworth received $814.40 (equivalent to $18,700 today) in reimbursement from the Washington State Toll Bridge Authority for his car and its contents, including Tubby the Cocker Spaniel.

=== Film of collapse ===
Footage of the old Tacoma Narrows Bridge collapsing (19.1 MB video, 02:30).

The collapse was filmed with two cameras by Barney Elliott and by Harbine Monroe, owners of The Camera Shop in Tacoma, including the unsuccessful attempt to rescue Tubby. Their footage was subsequently sold to Paramount Pictures, which duplicated it for newsreels in black-and-white and distributed it worldwide to movie theaters. The footage was also incorporated into the storyline of Episode 1 of the 1950 serial Atom Man vs. Superman. Castle Films also received distribution rights for 8 mm home video. In 1998, The Tacoma Narrows Bridge Collapse was selected for preservation in the United States National Film Registry by the Library of Congress as being culturally, historically, or aesthetically significant. This footage is still shown to engineering, architecture, and physics students as a cautionary tale.

Elliott and Monroe's footage of the construction and collapse was shot on 16 mm Kodachrome film, but most copies in circulation are in black and white because newsreels of the day copied the film onto 35 mm black-and-white stock. There were also film-speed discrepancies between Monroe's and Elliot's footage, with Monroe filming at 24 frames per second and Elliott at 16 frames per second. As a result, most copies in circulation also show the bridge oscillating approximately 50% faster than real time, due to an assumption during conversion that the film was shot at 24 frames per second rather than the actual 16 fps.

Another reel of film emerged in February 2019, taken by Arthur Leach from the Gig Harbor (westward) side of the bridge, and one of the few known images of the collapse from that side. Leach was a civil engineer who served as toll collector for the bridge, and is believed to have been the last person to cross the bridge to the west before its collapse, trying to prevent further crossings from that side as the bridge became unstable. Leach's footage (originally on black-and-white film but then recorded to video cassette by filming the projection) also includes Leach's commentary at the time of the collapse.

== Inquiry ==
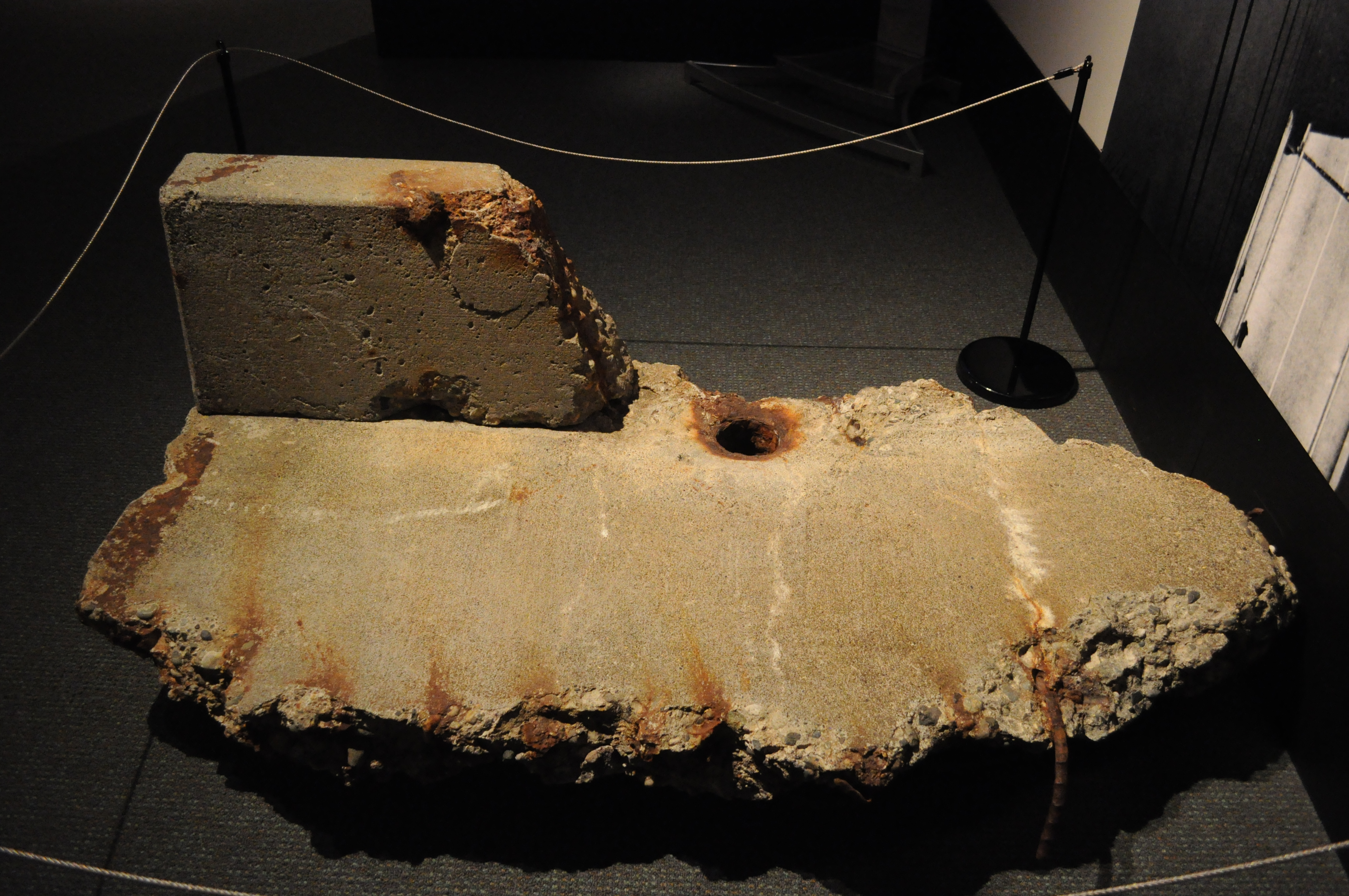
A fragment of the collapsed bridge, in the Washington State History Museum in Tacoma

Theodore von Kármán, the director of the Guggenheim Aeronautical Laboratory and a world-renowned aerodynamicist, was a member of the board of inquiry into the collapse. He reported that the State of Washington was unable to collect on one of the insurance policies for the bridge because its insurance agent had fraudulently pocketed the insurance premiums. The agent, Hallett R. French, who represented the Merchant's Fire Assurance Company, was charged and tried for grand larceny for withholding the premiums for $800,000 worth of insurance (equivalent to $18.4 million today). The bridge was insured by many other policies that covered 80% of the $5.2 million structure's value (equivalent to $119.5 million today). Most of these were collected without incident.

On November 28, 1940, the U.S. Navy's Hydrographic Office reported that the remains of the bridge were located at geographical coordinates 47°16′N 122°33′W, at a depth of 180 feet (55 meters).

=== Federal Works Agency Commission ===
A commission formed by the Federal Works Agency studied the collapse of the bridge. The board of engineers responsible for the report were Othmar Ammann, Theodore von Kármán, and Glenn B. Woodruff. Without drawing any definitive conclusions, the commission explored three possible failure causes:

- Aerodynamic instability by self-induced vibrations in the structure
- Eddy formations that might be periodic
- Random effects of turbulence, that is the random fluctuations in velocity of the wind.

=== Cause of the collapse ===
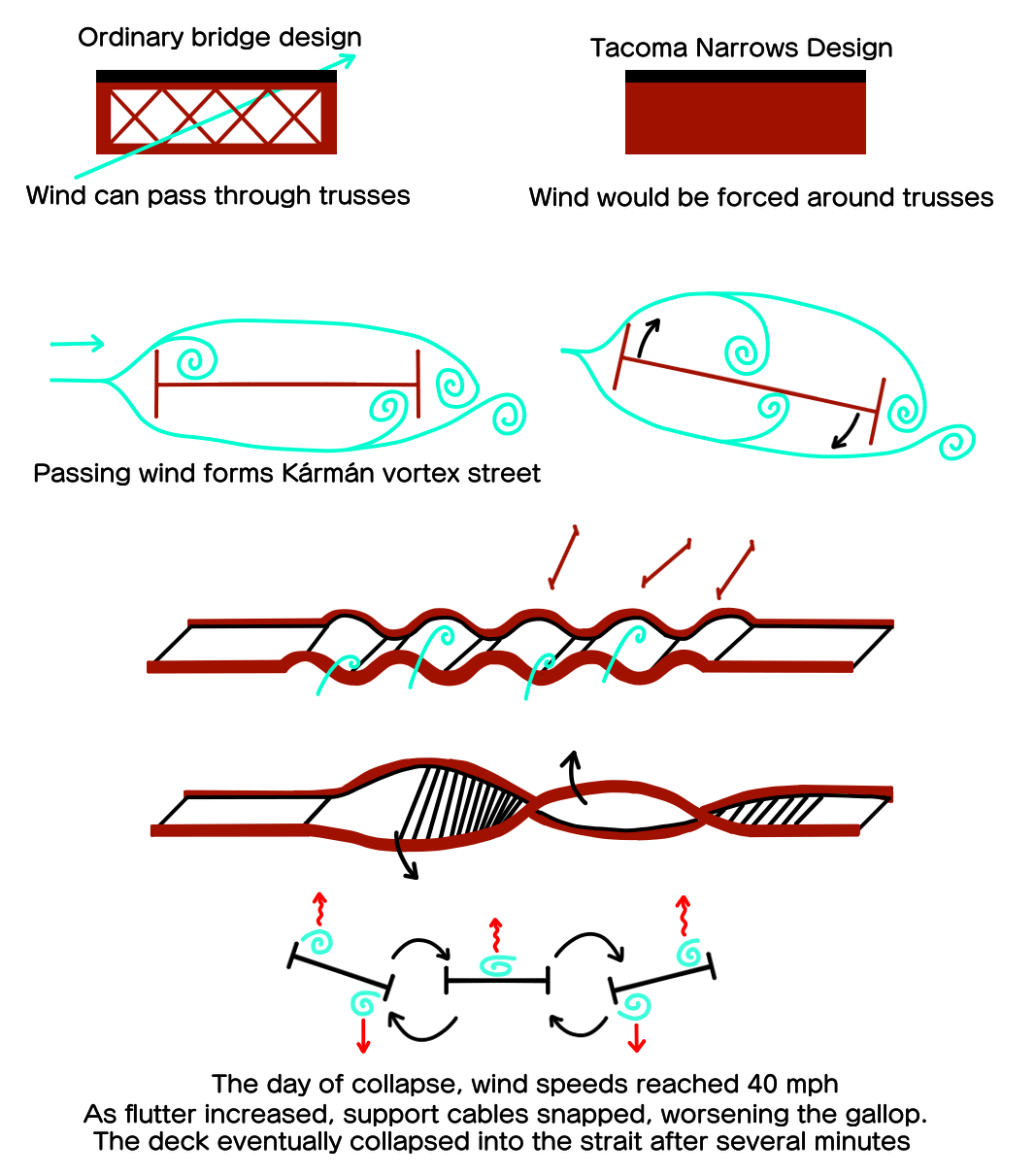
Simplistic representation of the collapse of the Tacoma Narrows Bridge

The original Tacoma Narrows Bridge was the first to be built with girders of carbon steel anchored in concrete blocks; preceding designs typically had open lattice beam trusses underneath the roadbed. This bridge was the first of its type to employ plate girders (pairs of deep I-beams) to support the roadbed. With the earlier designs, any wind would pass through the truss, but in the new design, the wind would be diverted above and below the structure. Shortly after construction finished at the end of June (opened to traffic on July 1, 1940), it was discovered that the bridge would sway and buckle dangerously in relatively mild windy conditions that are common for the area, and worse during severe winds. This vibration was transverse, one-half of the central span rising while the other lowered. Drivers would see cars approaching from the other direction rise and fall, riding the violent energy wave through the bridge. However, at that time the mass of the bridge was considered sufficient to keep it structurally sound.

The failure of the bridge occurred when a never-before-seen twisting mode occurred, from winds at 40 miles per hour (64 km/h). This is a so-called torsional vibration mode (which is different from the transverse or longitudinal vibration mode), whereby when the left side of the roadway went down, the right side would rise, and vice versa, i.e., the two halves of the bridge twisted in opposite directions, with the center line of the road remaining still (motionless). This vibration was caused by aeroelastic fluttering.

Full-scale, two-way Fluid Structure Interaction (FSI) model of the Tacoma Narrows Bridge exhibiting aeroelastic flutter

Fluttering is a physical phenomenon in which several degrees of freedom of a structure become coupled in an unstable oscillation driven by the wind. Here, unstable means that the forces and effects that cause the oscillation are not checked by forces and effects that limit the oscillation, so it does not self-limit but grows without bound. Eventually, the amplitude of the motion produced by the fluttering increased beyond the strength of a vital part, in this case the suspender cables. As several cables failed, the weight of the deck transferred to the adjacent cables, which became overloaded and broke in turn until almost all of the central deck fell into the water below the span.

==== Resonance (due to Von Kármán vortex street) hypothesis ====
Vortex shedding and Kármán vortex street behind a circular cylinder. The first hypothesis of the failure of the Tacoma Narrows Bridge was resonance (due to the Kármán vortex street). This is because it was thought that the Kármán vortex street frequency (the so-called Strouhal frequency) was the same as the torsional natural vibration frequency. This was found to be incorrect. The actual failure was due to aeroelastic flutter.

The bridge's spectacular destruction is often used as an object lesson in the necessity to consider both aerodynamics and resonance effects in civil and structural engineering. Billah and Scanlan (1991) reported that, in fact, many physics textbooks (for example Resnick et al. and Tipler et al.) wrongly explain that the cause of the failure of the Tacoma Narrows bridge was externally forced mechanical resonance. Resonance is the tendency of a system to oscillate at larger amplitudes at certain frequencies, known as the system's natural frequencies. At these frequencies, even relatively small periodic driving forces can produce large amplitude vibrations, because the system stores energy. For example, a child using a swing realizes that if the pushes are properly timed, the swing can move with a very large amplitude. The driving force, in this case the child pushing the swing, exactly replenishes the energy that the system loses if its frequency equals the natural frequency of the system.

Usually, the approach taken by those physics textbooks is to introduce a first order forced oscillator, defined by the second-order differential equation

$m\ddot{x}(t) + c\dot{x}(t) + kx(t) = F \cos (\omega t)$	eq. 1

where m, c and k stand for the mass, damping coefficient and stiffness of the linear system and F and ω represent the amplitude and the angular frequency of the exciting force. The solution of such ordinary differential equation as a function of time t represents the displacement response of the system (given appropriate initial conditions). In the above system resonance happens when ω is approximately $\omega_r = \sqrt{k/m}$, i.e., $\omega_r$ is the natural (resonant) frequency of the system. The actual vibration analysis of a more complicated mechanical system — such as an airplane, a building or a bridge — is based on the linearization of the equation of motion for the system, which is a multidimensional version of equation (eq. 1). The analysis requires eigenvalue analysis and thereafter the natural frequencies of the structure are found, together with the so-called fundamental modes of the system, which are a set of independent displacements and/or rotations that specify completely the displaced or deformed position and orientation of the body or system, i.e., the bridge moves as a (linear) combination of those basic deformed positions.

Each structure has natural frequencies. For resonance to occur, it is necessary to have also periodicity in the excitation force. The most tempting candidate of the periodicity in the wind force was assumed to be the so-called vortex shedding. This is because bluff (non-streamlined) bodies — like bridge decks — in a fluid stream produce (or "shed") wakes, whose characteristics depend on the size and shape of the body and the properties of the fluid. These wakes are accompanied by alternating low-pressure vortices on the downwind side of the body, the so-called Kármán vortex street or von Kármán vortex street. The body will in consequence try to move toward the low-pressure zone, in an oscillating movement called vortex-induced vibration. Eventually, if the frequency of vortex shedding matches the natural frequency of the structure, the structure will begin to resonate and the structure's movement can become self-sustaining.

The frequency of the vortices in the von Kármán vortex street is called the Strouhal frequency $f_s$, and is given by

$\frac{f_s D}{U} = S$	eq. 2

Here, U stands for the flow velocity, D is a characteristic length of the bluff body and S is the dimensionless Strouhal number, which depends on the body in question. For Reynolds numbers greater than 1000, the Strouhal number is approximately equal to 0.21. In the case of the Tacoma Narrows, D was approximately 8 feet (2.4 m) and S was 0.20.

It was thought that the Strouhal frequency was close enough to one of the natural vibration frequencies of the bridge, i.e., $2\pi f_s = \omega$, to cause resonance and therefore vortex-induced vibration.

In the case of the Tacoma Narrows Bridge, this appears not to have been the cause of the catastrophic damage. According to Farquharson, the wind was steady at 42 miles per hour (68 km/h) and the frequency of the destructive mode was 12 cycles/minute (0.2 Hz). This frequency was neither a natural mode of the isolated structure nor the frequency of blunt-body vortex shedding of the bridge at that wind speed, which was approximately 1 Hz. It can be concluded therefore that the vortex shedding was not the cause of the bridge collapse. The event can be understood only while considering the coupled aerodynamic and structural system that requires rigorous mathematical analysis to reveal all the degrees of freedom of the particular structure and the set of design loads imposed.

Vortex-induced vibration is a far more complex process that involves both the external wind-initiated forces and internal self-excited forces that lock on to the motion of the structure. During lock-on, the wind forces drive the structure at or near one of its natural frequencies, but as the amplitude increases this has the effect of changing the local fluid boundary conditions, so that this induces compensating, self-limiting forces, which restrict the motion to relatively benign amplitudes. This is clearly not a linear resonance phenomenon, even if the bluff body has linear behavior, since the exciting force amplitude is a nonlinear force of the structural response.

==== Resonance vs. non-resonance explanations ====
Billah and Scanlan state that Lee Edson in his biography of Theodore von Kármán is a source of misinformation: "The culprit in the Tacoma disaster was the Karman vortex street."

However, the Federal Works Administration report of the investigation, of which von Kármán was part, concluded that

It is very improbable that the resonance with alternating vortices plays an important role in the oscillations of suspension bridges. First, it was found that there is no sharp correlation between wind velocity and oscillation frequency such as is required in case of resonance with vortices whose frequency depends on the wind velocity.

A group of physicists cited "wind-driven amplification of the torsional oscillation" as distinct from resonance:

Subsequent authors have rejected the resonance explanation, and their perspective is gradually spreading to the physics community. The user's guide for the current American Association of Physics Teachers (AAPT) DVD states the bridge collapse "was not a case of resonance." Bernard Feldman likewise concluded in a 2003 article for the Physics Teacher that for the torsional oscillation mode, there was "no resonance behavior in the amplitude as a function of the wind velocity." An important source for both the AAPT user's guide and for Feldman was a 1991 American Journal of Physics article by K. Yusuf Billah and Robert Scanlan. According to the two engineers, the failure of the bridge was related to a wind-driven amplification of the torsional oscillation that, unlike a resonance, increases monotonically with increasing wind speed. The fluid dynamics behind that amplification is complicated, but one key element, as described by physicists Daniel Green and William Unruh, is the creation of large-scale vortices above and below the roadway, or deck, of the bridge. Nowadays, bridges are constructed to be rigid and to have mechanisms that damp oscillations. Sometimes they include a slot in the middle of the deck to alleviate pressure differences above and below the road.

To some degree the debate is due to the lack of a commonly accepted precise definition of resonance. Billah and Scanlan provide the following definition of resonance "In general, whenever a system capable of oscillation is acted on by a periodic series of impulses having a frequency equal to or nearly equal to one of the natural frequencies of the oscillation of the system, the system is set into oscillation with a relatively large amplitude." They then state later in their paper "Could this be called a resonant phenomenon? It would appear not to contradict the qualitative definition of resonance quoted earlier, if we now identify the source of the periodic impulses as self-induced, the wind supplying the power, and the motion supplying the power-tapping mechanism. If one wishes to argue, however, that it was a case of externally forced linear resonance, the mathematical distinction ... is quite clear, self-exciting systems differing strongly enough from ordinary linear resonant ones."

== Link to the Armistice Day blizzard ==
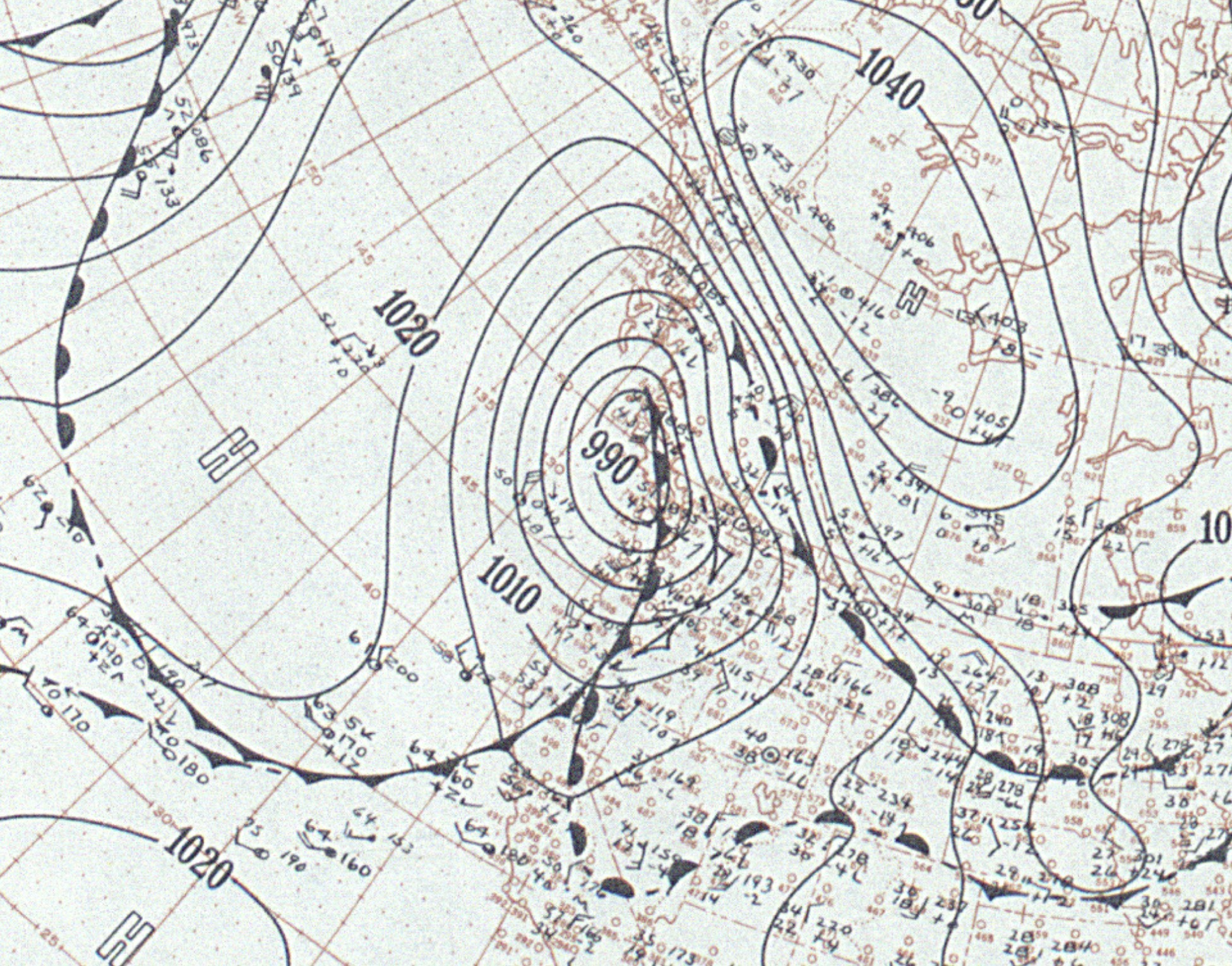
Surface weather map on November 7, showing the low-pressure area over the Pacific Northwest

The weather system that caused the bridge collapse went on to cause the 1940 Armistice Day Blizzard that killed 145 people in the Midwestern United States:

The strong winds in the Tacoma Narrows on 7 November 1940 were related to a remarkable low-pressure system that followed a track across the country and four days later produced the Armistice Day storm, one of the greatest storms ever to strike the Great Lakes region. For example, when the storm reached Illinois, the headline on the front page of the Chicago Tribune included the words "Heaviest winds in this century smash at city."

== Fate of the collapsed superstructure ==
Efforts to salvage the bridge began almost immediately after its collapse and continued into May 1943. Two review boards, one appointed by the federal government and one appointed by the state of Washington, concluded that repair of the bridge was impossible, and the entire bridge would have to be dismantled and an entirely new bridge superstructure built. With steel being a valuable commodity because of the involvement of the United States in World War II, steel from the bridge cables and the suspension span was sold as scrap metal to be melted down. The salvage operation cost the state more than was returned from the sale of the material, a net loss of over $350,000 (equivalent to $5,919,000 in 2022).

The cable anchorages, tower pedestals and most of the remaining substructure were relatively undamaged in the collapse, and were reused during construction of the replacement span that opened in 1950. The towers, which supported the main cables and road deck, suffered major damage at their bases from being deflected 12 feet (3.7 m) towards shore as a result of the collapse of the mainspan and the sagging of the sidespans. They were dismantled, and the steel sent to recyclers.

=== Preservation of the collapsed roadway ===
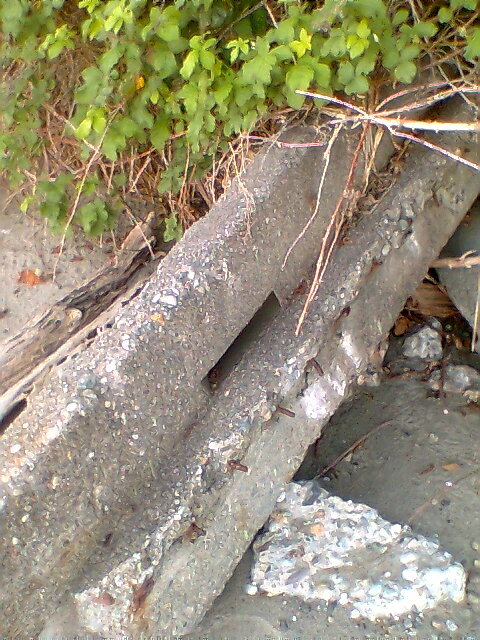
Remains of the collapsed bridge in May 2008

The underwater remains of the highway deck of the old suspension bridge act as a large artificial reef, and these are listed on the National Register of Historic Places with reference number 92001068.

The Harbor History Museum has a display in its main gallery regarding the 1940 bridge, its collapse, and the subsequent two bridges.

=== A lesson for history ===
Othmar Ammann, a leading bridge designer and member of the Federal Works Agency Commission investigating the collapse of the Tacoma Narrows Bridge, wrote:

...bridge engineering is not, as popularly assumed, an exact science. While ordinary structures are closely controlled by ample experience and experiments, every structure which projects into new and unexplored fields of magnitude involves new problems, for the solution of which neither theory nor practical experience can furnish an adequate guide. It is then that we must rely largely on our judgment and if as a result errors or failures occur we must accept them as a price for human progress.

Following the incident, engineers took extra caution to incorporate aerodynamics into their designs, and wind tunnel testing of designs was eventually made mandatory.

The Bronx–Whitestone Bridge, which is of similar design to the 1940 Tacoma Narrows Bridge, was reinforced shortly after the collapse. Fourteen-foot-high (4.3 m) steel trusses were installed on both sides of the deck in 1943 to weigh down and stiffen the bridge in an effort to reduce oscillation. In 2003, the stiffening trusses were removed and aerodynamic fiberglass fairings were installed along both sides of the road deck.

A key consequence was that suspension bridges reverted to a deeper and heavier truss design, including the replacement Tacoma Narrows Bridge (1950), until the development in the 1960s of box girder bridges with an airfoil shape such as the Severn Bridge, which gave the necessary stiffness together with reduced torsional forces.

== Replacement bridge ==
Because of shortages in materials and labor as a result of the involvement of the United States in World War II, it took 10 years before a replacement bridge was opened to traffic. This replacement bridge was opened to traffic on October 14, 1950, and is 5,979 feet (1,822 m) long, forty feet (12 m) longer than the original bridge. The replacement bridge also has more lanes than the original bridge, which only had two traffic lanes, plus shoulders on both sides.

Half a century later, the replacement bridge exceeded its traffic capacity, and a second, parallel, suspension bridge was constructed to carry eastbound traffic. The suspension bridge that was completed in 1950 was reconfigured to carry only westbound traffic. The new parallel bridge opened to traffic in July 2007.

== See also ==
- Engineering disasters
- Humen Pearl River Bridge, suspension bridge that shook violently until weight limits were implemented
- List of bridge failures
- List of structural failures and collapses
- Millennium Bridge, London, for an engineering error
- Silver Bridge, a bridge that collapsed in 1967 on the West Virginia–Ohio border
- Volgograd Bridge, a bridge in Russia that experienced similar problems with the wind
- Kutai Kartanegara Bridge, a suspension bridge that collapsed in Indonesia
- Deer Isle Bridge, a bridge built at the same time by the same people that also suffered oscillation problems
