= List of earthquakes in Washington =

Epicentres of major earthquakes in Washington with year of occurrence since 1900

This is a list of earthquakes in Washington, a U.S. state.

Date	Location	MMI	Mag.	Deaths	Injuries	Total damage / notes
2001-02-28	Puget Sound	VIII	6.8 M_{w}	0–1	400	$1–4 billion
1999-07-03	Satsop	VII	5.8 M_{w}		7	$8.1 million
1965-04-29	Puget Sound	VIII	6.7 M_{w}	7		$12.5 million
1962-11-06	Clark County	VII	5.2 M_{w}			Minor
1949-04-13	Olympia	VIII	6.7 M_{w}	8	At least 64	$25 million
1946-06-23	Strait of Georgia	VIII	7.3 M_{w}	2		Limited
1945-04-29	North Bend	VII	5.5 M_{s}			Minor
1891-11-29	Puget Sound	VI				Tsunami
1872-12-15	North Cascades	VIII	6.5–7.0			scientific interest
1700-01-26	Cascadia subduction zone		8.7–9.2 M_{w}			Tsunami
Note: The inclusion criteria for adding events are based on WikiProject Earthquakes' notability guideline that was developed for stand-alone articles. The principles described also apply to lists. In summary, only damaging, injurious, or deadly events should be recorded.
