= Omak Rock =

Boulder in the US state of Washington

- Balancing rock
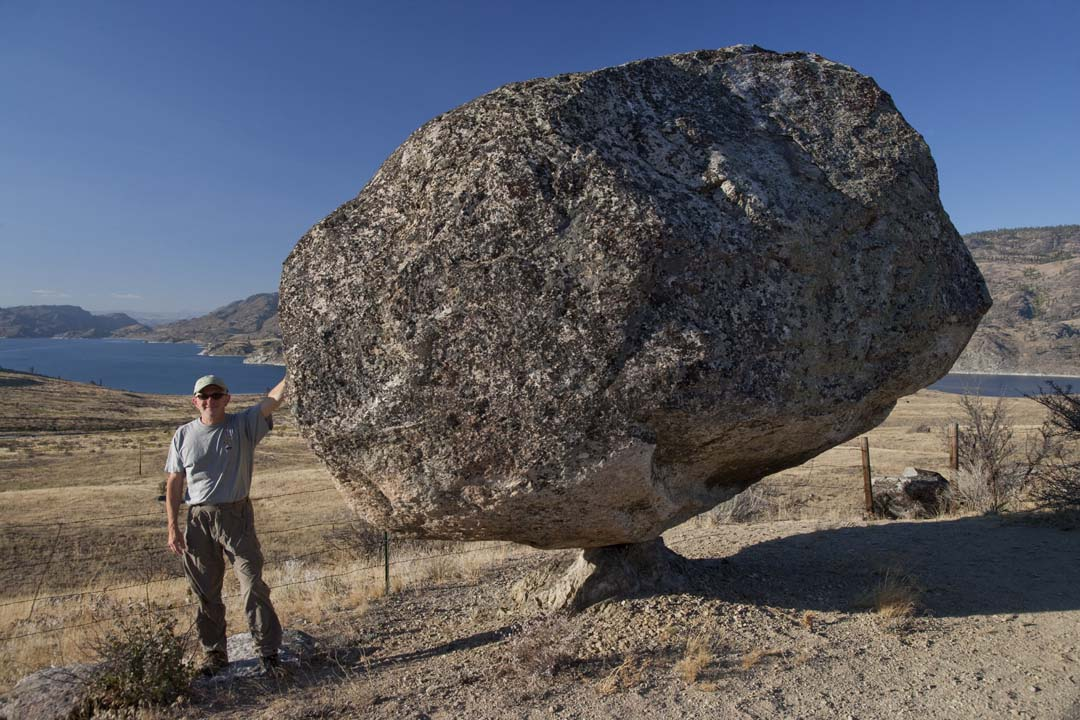
- Omak Rock with Omak Lake in the background
- Coordinates: 48°14′06″N 119°22′02″W

Composition
- Granite

Omak Rock, also known as Balance Rock, is a balancing rock in the Colville Indian Reservation, in the U.S. state of Washington. Located within the Greater Omak Area of the Okanogan Country, the glacial erratic is about 1,340 feet (410 m) from Omak Lake. It is positioned within the vicinity of the 1872 North Cascades earthquake, which it survived. The fact of its survival has been the basis of studies to help determine the acceleration and intensity of the quake. Some believe that the epicenter of the earthquake may have been very close to Omak Rock. The Confederated Tribes of the Colville Reservation believe that the rock represents a symbol of nature's perfection in the region.

== See also ==
- List of individual rocks
