= Volgograd Bridge =

Bridge in Volgograd, Russia

Coordinates: 48°43′17″N 44°33′2″E

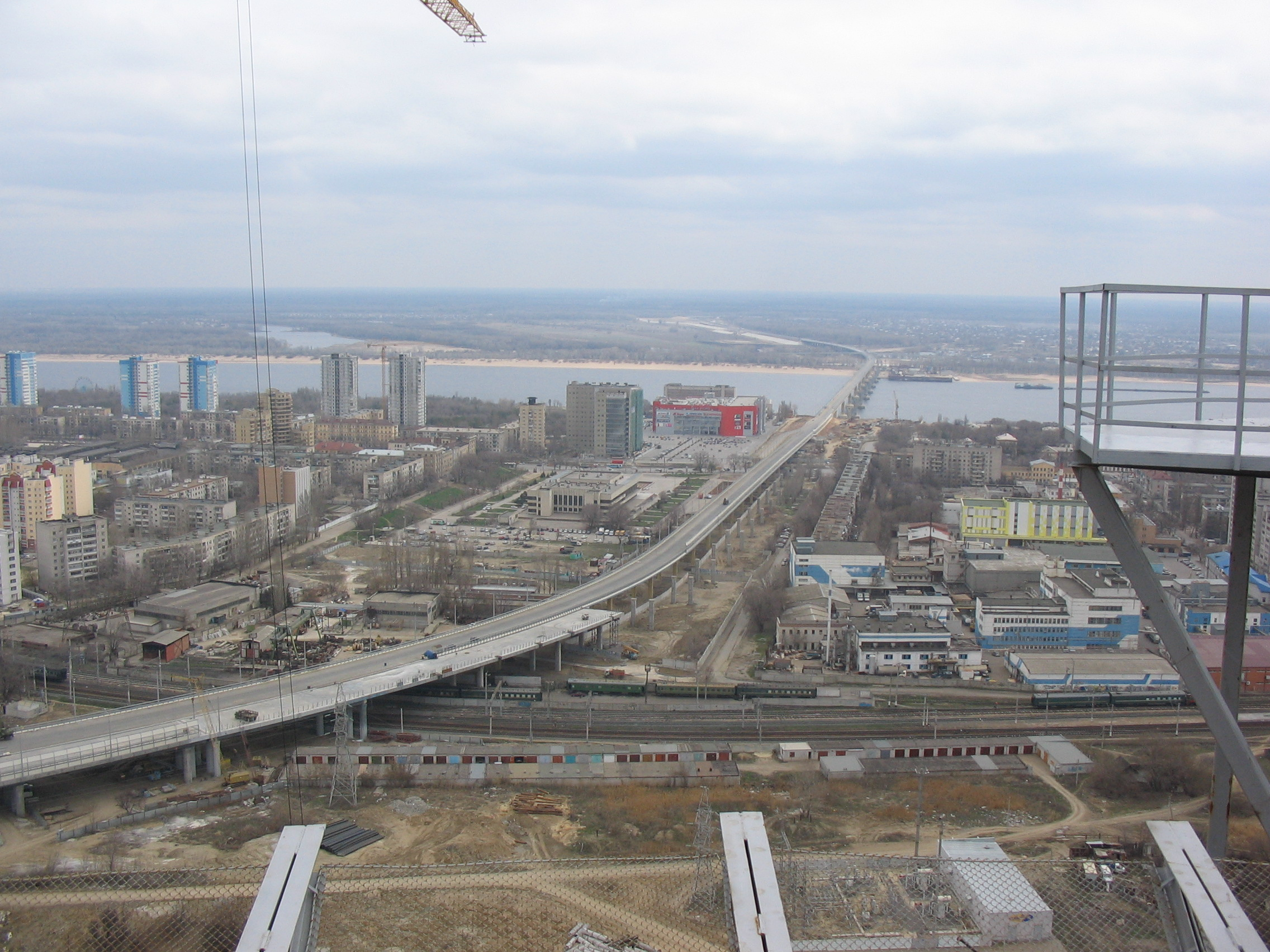
Bridge under construction, April 2009

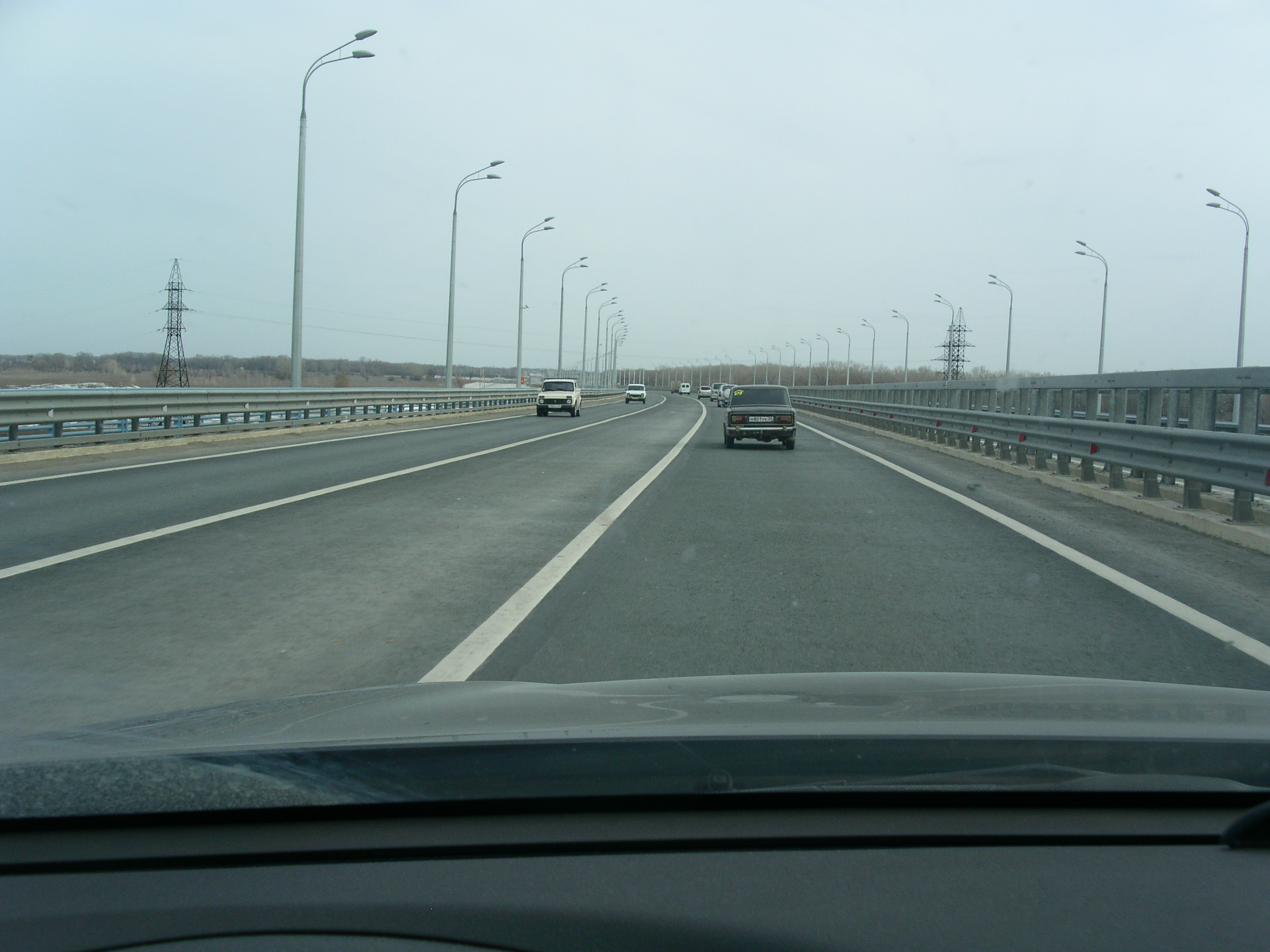
View from a car on top of Volgograd Bridge, March 2010)

Volgograd Bridge (Russian: Волгоградский мост) is a concrete girder bridge over the Volga River in the city of Volgograd, Russia. The bridge and adjacent flyovers are 2,514 m (8,248 ft) long. The bridge, which was inaugurated October 10, 2009, after 13 years of construction, is a key part of a planned 30 km (19 mi) highway route that also includes a future bridge over the Akhtuba River.

== Current state ==
Currently, a single span (a second is still under construction) connects Mamayev Kurgan on the right (western) bank of the Volga with the road to Krasnoslobodsk on a spit between the Volga and the Akhtuba. It is the first bridge over the Volga in Volgograd Oblast; previously, the only automobile route over the river in the region passed over the Volga Hydroelectric Station dam.

== Oscillations due to wind ==
On May 20, 2010, authorities closed the bridge to all motor traffic due to strong oscillations caused by windy conditions. The bridge remained closed while it was inspected for damage until the morning of May 25. It was then reopened for public access. To suppress the oscillations of the bridge, semi-active tuned mass dampers were developed and implemented by the German company Maurer Söhne in collaboration with the Swiss Federal Laboratories Empa and mutually with the University of the German Federal Armed Forces. The concept of the semi-active tuned mass dampers was proposed and laboratory validated at the Swiss Federal Laboratories Empa by Dr. Felix Weber (Empa) and Dr. Marcin Maślanka (AGH University of Science and Technology). In autumn 2011, 12 semi-active tuned mass dampers were installed in the bridge. Each one consists of a mass 5,200 kg (11,500 lb), a set of compression springs and a magnetorheological damper.

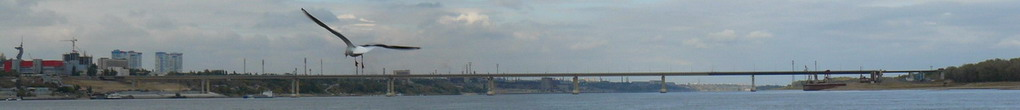
Panorama of the bridge

== See also ==
- List of longest bridges in the world
- Tacoma Narrows Bridge (1940)
- Humen Pearl River Bridge
