= Ross Lake Fault =

Ross Lake fault
- Ross Lake fault zone
- Named by: Peter Misch
- Country: USA Canada
- Region: North America

Tectonics
- Orogeny: Cordillera

The 10 kilometer wide Ross Lake fault zone (RLFZ) is part of a 500 kilometer long zone of high-angle faults in the North American Cordillera of Washington and Canada. The RLFZ consists of two major sets of faults. The eastern set of the Hozameen and Slate Creek faults and more southerly North Creek fault form the western boundary of the Jurassic-Cretaceous Methow River basin and in part separate it from metamorphic equivalents of Methow strata. Minor structures along the North Creek fault record dextral strike-slip events that occurred between approximately 88 and 50 Ma. The same formations lie on both sides of the faults, implying modest slip (tens of km?). The northernmost strand of the western fault set, the Ross Lake fault itself, is a vertical zone of horizontally-lineated mylonite that separates upper-amphibolite-facies rocks of the Cascades crystalline core from sub-greenschist-facies rocks to the east. Some dextral shear and 6–12 km of NE-side down normal slip occurred from 50(?) to post-45 Ma. At Elijah Ridge, the Ross Lake fault steps westward across a gently dipping extensional zone to the Gabriel Peak tectonic belt. This approximately 100 kilometer long, northeast-dipping mylonite zone is dominated by flattening, but kinematic indicators record dextral shear in the north and reverse shear farther south. This transpressional deformation occurred from 65 Ma (and earlier?) to 58 Ma when at least 7–24 km of dextral slip was probably transferred to the eastern faults by ENE-striking shear zones. Younger (< 50 Ma) ENE-striking sinistral faults at least locally accommodated 5–10 km of dextral strike slip by vertical axis rotation. The fault sets merge southward to form the Foggy Dew fault zone where mylonites record oblique dextral-normal slip (down-to-E). Slip is bracketed between 65 and 48 Ma; some occurred after 60 Ma and the zone records the regional transition from approximately 65–58 Ma transpression to approximately 57–45 Ma transtension. The fault zone is truncated to the SE by the 48 Ma Cooper Mountain batholith, which also obliterates its intersection with the southern continuation of the Pasayten fault. South of this batholith, only a narrow, discontinuous shear zone is on strike with the Foggy Dew fault and similar units lie on both sides of this projection of the RLFZ.
