= 1965 Puget Sound earthquake =

Earthquake in Washington

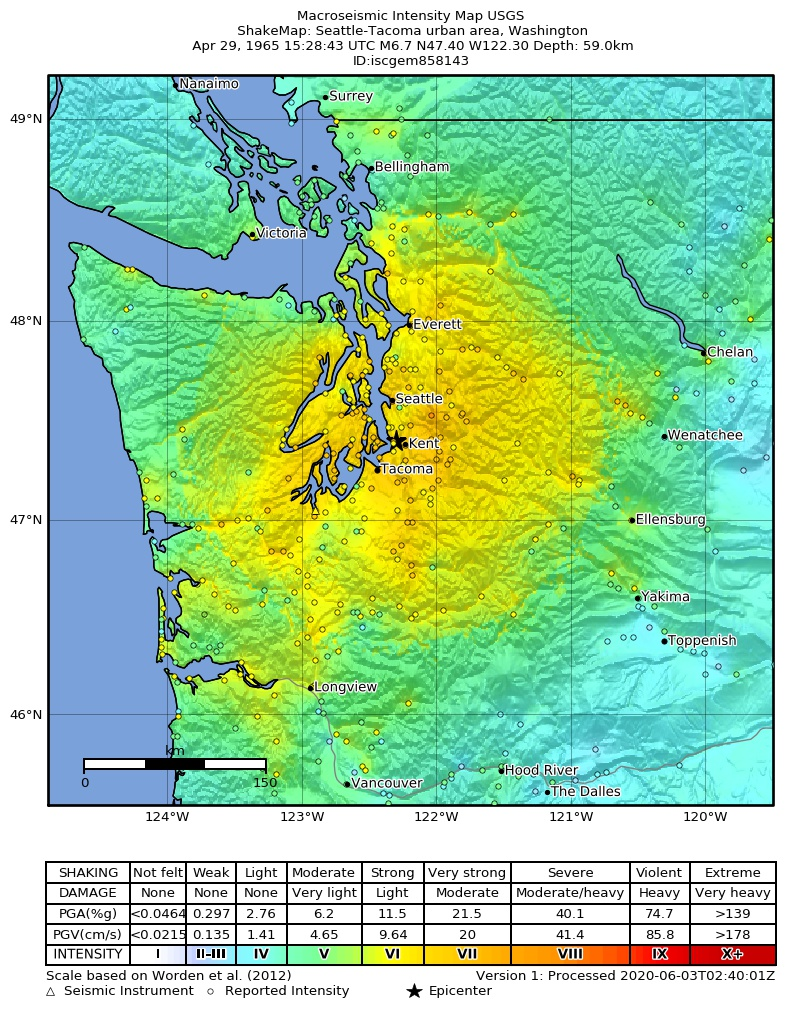
- USGS ShakeMap

- Location within Washington (state)
- UTC time: 1965-04-29 15:28:45
- ISC event: 858143
- USGS-ANSS: ComCat
- Local date: April 29, 1965; 61 years ago
- Local time: 08:28:45 PDT
- Magnitude: 6.7 M_{w}
- Depth: 59 km (37 mi)
- Epicenter: 47.4°N 122.3°W
- Type: Dip-slip
- Areas affected: Puget Sound region Washington; United States
- Total damage: $12.5–28 million
- Max. intensity: MMI VIII (Severe)
- Peak acceleration: 0.204 g at Olympia
- Aftershocks: None
- Casualties: 7 dead

The 1965 Puget Sound earthquake occurred at 08:28 AM PDT (15:28 UTC) on April 29 within the Puget Sound region of Washington state. It had a magnitude of 6.7 on the moment magnitude scale and a maximum perceived intensity of VIII (Severe) on the Mercalli intensity scale. It caused the deaths of seven people and about $12.5–28 million in damage. There were no recorded aftershocks.

== Tectonic setting ==
The western part of Washington State lies above the Cascadia subduction zone, where the Juan de Fuca plate is being subducted beneath the North American plate. The seismicity of this region consists of rare great megathrust earthquakes, like the 1700 Cascadia earthquake, and more common earthquakes originating from within the subducting slab. These events relate to normal faulting, associated with the bending of the slab, possibly related to a phase change below about 40 km from basalt/gabbro to eclogite.

== Earthquake ==
The earthquake had an estimated magnitude of 6.6 M_{s}, 6.5 mb and 6.7 M_{w}. At 10–20 seconds the duration of strong ground motion was relatively short. The earthquake's focal mechanism indicates that it resulted from normal faulting within the Juan de Fuca slab. There were no recorded aftershocks, similar to observations from the 1949 Olympia and 2001 Nisqually earthquakes and a characteristic of such intraslab events.

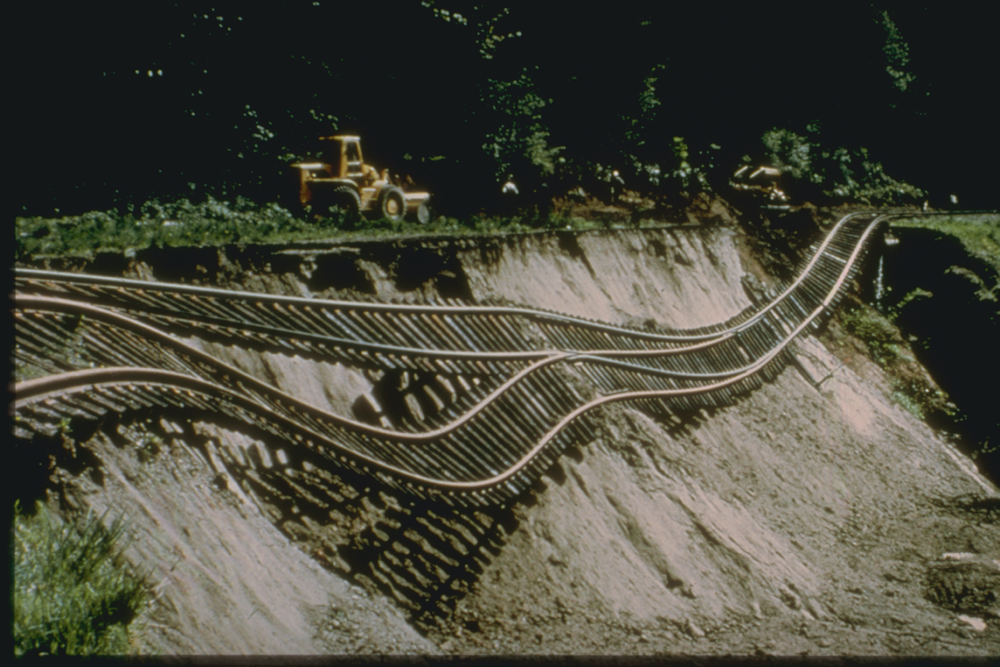
Damage to the Union Pacific Railway occurred when fill slid away from beneath part of a branch line just outside Olympia

=== Intensity ===
The pattern of shaking intensity was somewhat variable, with a large region with an intensity of VII (Very strong) containing localized areas of intensity VIII (Severe). These variations generally relate closely to the underlying geology, with higher intensities recorded where there was either artificial fill or alluvium, although there were some exceptions. The observed pattern of intensities was very similar to those from the 1949 Olympia and 2001 Nisqually earthquakes.

=== Damage ===
Three people were killed by falling debris in the Duwamish valley floor area of Seattle, and four others died from heart attacks. There was minor damage recorded over a large area, including fallen chimneys and cracked mortar. The two Boeing plants at Renton and Seattle, both built on artificial fill and mudflats, suffered major damage. The State Capitol building in Olympia suffered cracking to the dome and supporting buttresses, leaving it in a condition where a major aftershock could have caused complete collapse. Single-story unreinforced brick buildings performed the worst in the earthquake with wood-framed structures generally performing very well. Major highways had relatively little damage, with some sections of U.S. Route 101 sinking 1 to 2 feet (0.30 to 0.61 m). The Tacoma Narrows Bridge was closed for 30 minutes as a precaution but reopened with only damage to light fixtures and weather seals on cables.

=== Ground acceleration ===
A peak ground acceleration of 0.204g was measured at Olympia.

== Aftermath ==
The damage and deaths in the 1965 earthquake helped bring about the installation of the Pacific Northwest Seismic Network in 1969.

== See also ==
- List of earthquakes in 1965
- List of earthquakes in Washington
