= 1949 Olympia earthquake =

Earthquake in Washington state

- Location within Washington (state)
- UTC time: 1949-04-13 19:55:43
- ISC event: 896466
- USGS-ANSS: ComCat
- Local date: April 13, 1949
- Local time: 11:55:44
- Duration: ~ 20 seconds
- Magnitude: 6.7 M_{w}
- Depth: 50 km (31 mi)
- Epicenter: 47.0°N 122.53°W
- Areas affected: Puget Sound region Washington; United States
- Total damage: $25 million
- Max. intensity: MMI VIII (Severe)
- Peak acceleration: 0.25 g
- Casualties: 8 killed At least 64 injured

The 1949 Olympia earthquake occurred on April 13 at 11:55:44 local time with a moment magnitude of 6.7 and a maximum Mercalli Intensity of VIII (Severe). The shock was located in the area between Olympia and Tacoma, and was felt throughout the state, as well as parts of Oregon, British Columbia, Idaho, and Montana. It is the largest recorded earthquake to occur in the Puget Sound region of Washington. Eight people were killed, a minimum of 64 people were injured, and the total damage is estimated at $25 million.

== Damage ==
Damage in Olympia from the earthquake was estimated between $500,000 and $1 million by Governor Arthur B. Langlie. Eight buildings on the State Capital campus were damaged by the earthquake, as well as the Old Capitol Building in downtown Olympia. A 23-ton cradle on the east tower of the Tacoma Narrows Bridge fell 500 feet (150 m), injuring two men. The earthquake caused geysers to explode along the railroad track in the Tacoma tidal flats and in Puyallup.

In Seattle, nearly every building in the Pioneer Square neighborhood was affected in some way, with damage ranging from lost parapets to entire floors and in some cases entire buildings needing to be demolished over the following years. Most buildings still show the scars of earthquake damage and the mostly hasty repairs made to them.

Chimneys throughout western Washington collapsed. Severe damage were recorded at schools in Adna and Napavine, and structural losses to buildings in Centralia's downtown district. The earthquake caused catastrophic loss to two schools in Chehalis, a state training school for youths and West Side Elementary; neither were rebuilt.

Eight people were killed, including young crossing guard Marvin Klegman who shielded a second-grader from falling bricks. At least 64 people were injured, and the total damage is estimated at $25 million.

== See also ==
- 1965 Puget Sound earthquake
- 2001 Nisqually earthquake
- List of earthquakes in 1949
- List of earthquakes in the United States
- List of earthquakes in Washington
