= Omak Lake =

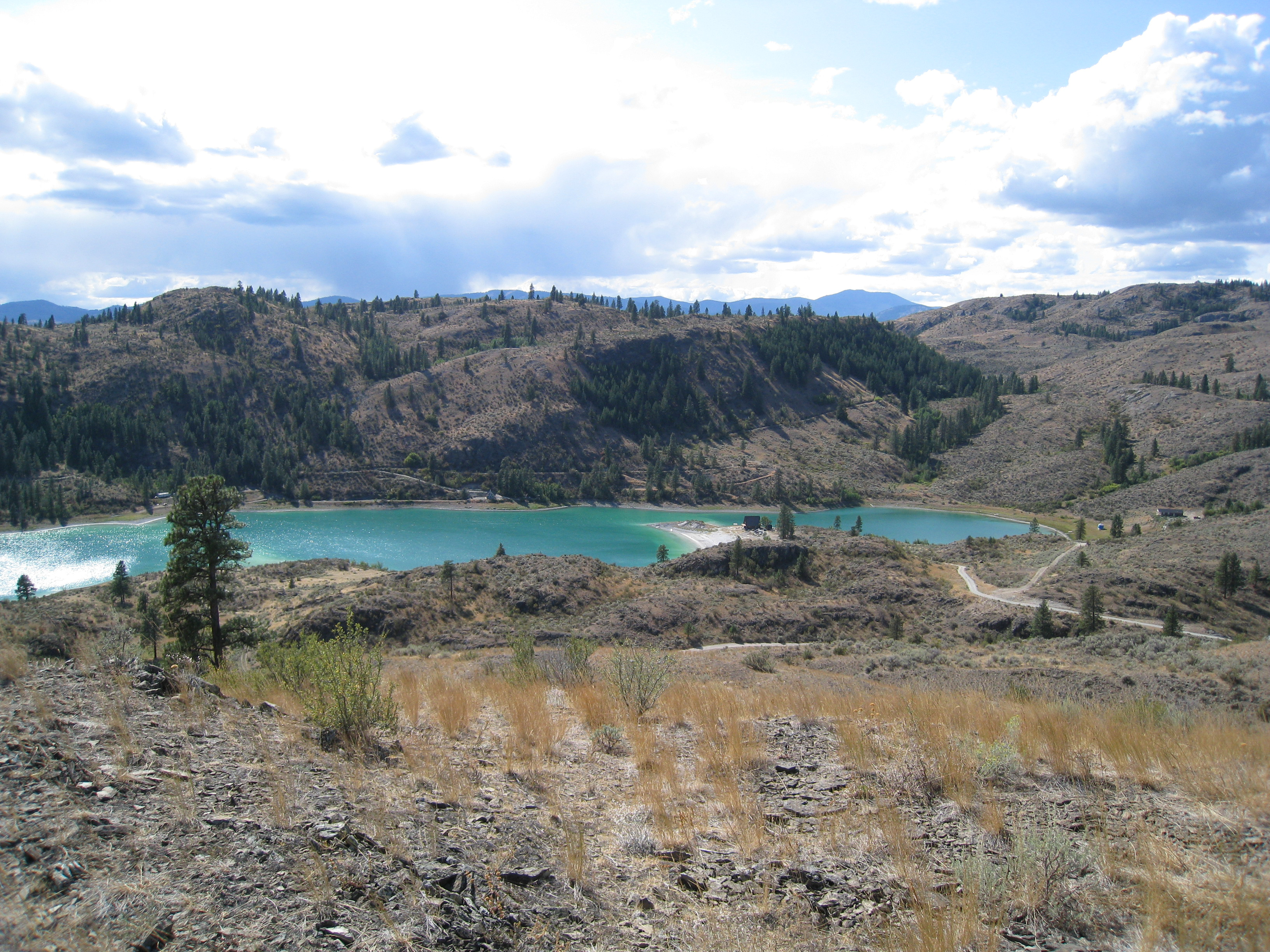
- Aerial view of Omak Lake

- Location of Omak Lake in Washington
- Location: Okanogan, Washington, United States
- Coordinates: 48°16′42.56″N 119°23′52.18″W
- Type: Lake
- Basin countries: United States
- Surface area: 3,243.9 acres (13.128 km^{2})
- Max. depth: 325 ft (99 m)
- Water volume: 30,710,000,000 ft^{3} (870,000,000 m^{3})
- Surface elevation: 958 ft (292 m)
- Settlements: Omak

Omak Lake is a saline endorheic lake in the U.S. state of Washington, within the Greater Omak Area. The lake covers 3,244 acres (13.13 km^{2}) at an elevation of 950 feet (290 m) and is fed by three small creeks. With a volume of 705,000 acre-feet (870,000,000 m^{3}) and depth of 325 feet (99 m), Omak is the largest saline lake in Washington.

The name Omak comes from the Okanogan placename [umák].

Omak Lake occupies a former channel of the Columbia River. The Okanagan people once believed that Omak Lake was inhabited by spirits, and avoided the area.
