= Washington State Route 302 =

State highway in northwestern Washington, US

State Route 302

- SR 302 highlighted in red

Route information
- Auxiliary route of SR 3
- Maintained by WSDOT
- Length: 16.87 mi (27.15 km)
- Existed: 1964–present

Major junctions
- West end: SR 3 in Allyn
- East end: SR 16 near Purdy

Location
- Country: United States
- State: Washington
- Counties: Mason, Pierce

Highway system
- State highways in Washington; Interstate; US; State; Scenic; Pre-1964; 1964 renumbering; Former
← SR 300	→ SR 303

State Route 302 (SR 302) is a 16.87-mile-long (27.15 km) state highway in the U.S. state of Washington, connecting the communities of Allyn and Purdy on the Kitsap Peninsula, located in Mason and Pierce counties. The highway travels southeast from SR 3 in Allyn-Grapeview along North Bay and turns east along Henderson Bay to Purdy. SR 302 intersects its spur route and turns south, ending at an interchange with SR 16 at the north end of Gig Harbor. The highway was created during the 1964 highway renumbering to replace Secondary State Highway 14A (SSH 14A) between Allyn and Purdy.

== Route description ==
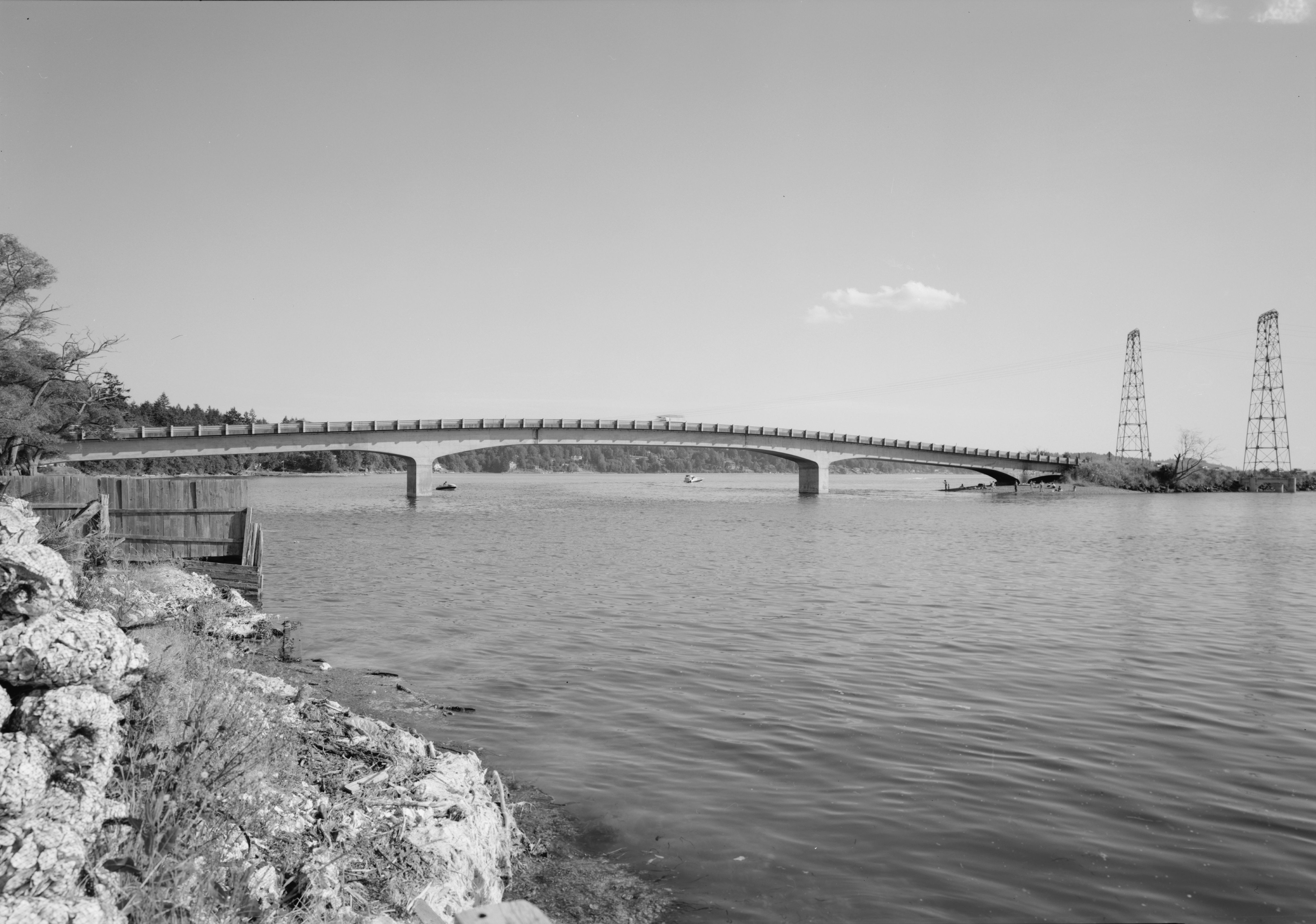
SR 302 crosses Purdy Creek on the Purdy Bridge into the community of Purdy, near its eastern terminus in Pierce County.

SR 302 begins as the Victor Cutoff Road at an intersection with SR 3 south of North Mason High School, located in the community of Allyn in Mason County. The highway travels south along the North Bay of Case Inlet into Pierce County and east across the Key Peninsula toward Henderson Bay. SR 302 continues east through Wauna and across a sandspit on the 550-foot-long (170 m) Purdy Bridge into the community of Purdy; the two-lane hollow box girder bridge crosses Burley Lagoon and is listed on the National Register of Historic Places. In Purdy, the highway turns south onto Purdy Drive at an intersection with its spur route and ends at a semi-directional T interchange with SR 16.

Every year, the Washington State Department of Transportation (WSDOT) conducts a series of surveys on its highways in the state to measure traffic volume. This is expressed in terms of annual average daily traffic (AADT), which is a measure of traffic volume for any average day of the year. In 2011, WSDOT calculated that the busiest section of the highway was Purdy Drive between the Purdy Bridge and SR 16, serving 26,000 vehicles, while the least busiest section of the highway was in the Allyn area, serving 1,500 vehicles.

== History ==
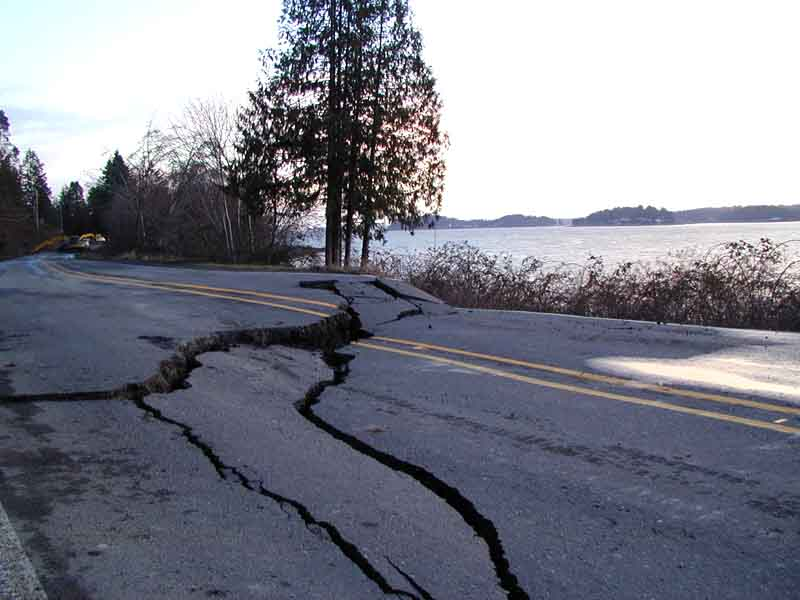
Damage to the surface of SR 302 near Allyn after the 2001 Nisqually earthquake

The Purdy Bridge, serving the community of Purdy on the Burley Lagoon, was constructed as a wooden swing bridge in 1892 by Pierce County. The wooden bridge was replaced in 1905 after the timber pilings collapsed and rebuilt in 1920 to include a steel swing span. The current two-lane hollow box girder span was opened on September 29, 1937 at a cost of $62,000 and became part of SSH 14A during the creation of the primary and secondary state highways. SSH 14A was extended west from Allyn to Belfair in 1955, extending along a 19.45-mile-long (31.30 km) route to connect Belfair and Allyn to Purdy. SSH 14A was replaced by SR 3 from Belfair to Allyn and SR 302 from Allyn to SR 16 in Purdy during the 1964 highway renumbering as part of the creation of a new state highway system. SR 16 was moved to a freeway bypass of Purdy in November 1978 and the old alignment on Purdy Drive was split between SR 302, heading south, and a new spur route, heading north. The highway was realigned in 1991 onto the Victor Cut-Off Road, which was transferred from the county to the state.

During the 2001 Nisqually earthquake, a magnitude 6.2 earthquake that occurred on February 28, 2001, a section of SR 302 between Allyn and the Key Peninsula was damaged and closed. The highway was repaired with federal emergency relief funds and state funding at a cost of $1 million, opening to traffic in 2003 after being replaced by a temporary gravel road. WSDOT is, as of January 2013, planning to widen SR 302 between the Key Peninsula and Purdy and SR 302 Spur within Purdy as part of safety and congestion improvements scheduled to begin construction in spring 2014. A corridor study was conducted by WSDOT between 2008 and 2012 and proposed that a new highway north of Henderson Bay to bypass Purdy and have a more direct connection with SR 16 be constructed.

== Spur route ==
State Route 302 Spur
- Location: Purdy, Washington
- Length: 1.28 mi (2.06 km)
- Existed: 1987–present

SR 302 Spur, known locally as Purdy Drive, begins its short, 1.28-mile-long (2.06 km) route through Purdy at the east end of the Purdy Bridge, which carries SR 302 from Wauna. The highway travels north along Burley Lagoon from Peninsula High School before ending at a semi-directional T interchange with SR 16. WSDOT conducted a series of surveys to measure traffic volume in terms of AADT and calculated that between 1,900 and 11,000 vehicles per day used the spur route in 2011.

The spur route was originally part of a Primary State Highway 14 (PSH 14) branch connecting Port Orchard to Tacoma that later became SR 16 during the 1964 highway renumbering. SR 16 was moved to a freeway bypass of Purdy in 1978 and the former route was split between SR 302 and the newly created SR 302 Spur.

== Major intersections ==
County	Location	mi	km	Destinations	Notes
Mason		0.00	0.00	SR 3 – Shelton, Belfair	Western terminus
Pierce	Burley Lagoon	15.69– 15.79	25.25– 25.41	Purdy Bridge	
Pierce	Purdy	15.85	25.51	SR 302 Spur to SR 16 north – Port Orchard, Bremerton	Southern terminus of SR 302 Spur
Pierce		16.87	27.15	SR 16 south – Tacoma	Eastern terminus, interchange
1.000 mi = 1.609 km; 1.000 km = 0.621 mi
