= Burley, Washington =

- Census-designated place
- Location in Washington and the United States Burley (the United States)
- Coordinates: 47°25′03″N 122°37′46″W
- Country: United States
- State: Washington
- County: Kitsap

Area
  - Total: 4.92 sq mi (12.73 km^{2})
  - Land: 4.76 sq mi (12.34 km^{2})
  - Water: 0.15 sq mi (0.39 km^{2})
- Elevation: 85 ft (26 m)

Population (2020)
  - Total: 2,081
  - Density: 436.8/sq mi (168.6/km^{2})
- Time zone: UTC-8 (Pacific (PST))
  - Summer (DST): UTC-7 (PDT)
- ZIP Code: 98322
- Area code(s): 360, 564
- FIPS code: 53-08885
- GNIS feature ID: 2584954

Burley is an unincorporated community and census-designated place (CDP) in Kitsap County, Washington, United States. It is located just north of the boundary with Pierce County, about halfway between Gig Harbor to the south and Port Orchard to the north. It is located at the head of the Burley Lagoon in Henderson Bay. Burley is a residential area. The community's population stood at 2,081 at the 2020 census.

== History ==
Burley was established in 1898 as a cooperative socialist colony by a group called the Co-operative Brotherhood, an offshoot of the Brotherhood of the Co-operative Commonwealth that had established Equality Colony elsewhere in Washington state in the previous year. Both communities were part of an attempt to plant socialist colonies in Washington in order to convert first the state, and then the entire nation, to socialism.

Burley was originally named "Brotherhood". Circle City was an area of the colony with buildings laid out on the periphery of a circle. In its earliest years the community achieved a maximum population of approximately 150, but like some other planned towns of the era such as Equality Colony, its population endured a long decline through the ensuing years. The local economy was dominated by the lumber industry; other businesses never flourished, though a cigar-manufacturing effort did achieve some short-term success.

== Geography ==
Burley is in southern Kitsap County. It is bordered to the south by the Pierce County communities of Wauna and Purdy. Washington State Route 16 passes through the eastern side of Burley, leading north 9 miles (14 km) to Port Orchard and south 7 miles (11 km) to Gig Harbor. According to the U.S. Census Bureau, the Burley CDP has a total area of 4.9 square miles (12.7 km^{2}), of which 4.7 square miles (12.3 km^{2}) are land and 0.2 square miles (0.4 km^{2}), or 3.04%, are water.

== Demographics ==
Historical population
Census	Pop.	Note	%±
2010	2,057		—
2020	2,081		1.2%
U.S. Decennial Census; 2000 2010 2020

Burley first appeared as a census designated place in the 2010 U.S. census.

=== Racial and ethnic composition ===
Burley CDP, Washington – Racial and ethnic composition Note: the US Census treats Hispanic/Latino as an ethnic category. This table excludes Latinos from the racial categories and assigns them to a separate category. Hispanics/Latinos may be of any race.
Race / Ethnicity (NH = Non-Hispanic)	Pop 2010	Pop 2020	% 2010	% 2020
White alone (NH)	1,799	1,720	87.46%	82.65%
Black or African American alone (NH)	12	13	0.58%	0.62%
Native American or Alaska Native alone (NH)	17	16	0.83%	0.77%
Asian alone (NH)	22	23	1.07%	1.11%
Native Hawaiian or Pacific Islander alone (NH)	16	27	0.78%	1.30%
Other race alone (NH)	10	12	0.49%	0.58%
Mixed race or Multiracial (NH)	106	174	5.15%	8.36%
Hispanic or Latino (any race)	75	96	3.65%	4.61%
Total	2,057	2,081	100.00%	100.00%

== See also ==
- Social Democracy of America
- Socialist Party of Washington
