= KGHP =

High school radio station in Gig Harbor, Washington

Coordinates: 47.241°N 122.772°W

- Gig Harbor, Washington; United States
- Broadcast area: Gig Harbor, Washington, Tacoma, Washington, and surrounding areas
- Frequency: 89.9 MHz
- Branding: KGHP-FM

Programming
- Format: Variety

Ownership
- Owner: Peninsula School District

History
- First air date: October 1988
- Call sign meaning: Gig Harbor Peninsula

Technical information
- Licensing authority: FCC
- Facility ID: 52167
- Class: A
- ERP: 1,350 watts horizontal 800 watts vertical
- HAAT: 61 meters
- Translators: 89.3 K207AZ (Gig Harbor); 105.7 K289BZ (Gig Harbor)

Links
- Public license information: Public file; LMS
- Webcast: Listen live
- Website: KGHP Online

KGHP (89.9 FM) is a student-run high school radio station operating on a non-commercial license in Gig Harbor, Washington. Owned by the Peninsula School District #401, the station's studio is located on the campus of Peninsula High School. With its two translators, K207AZ 89.3 and K289BZ 105.7, the station's signal covers most of the Gig Harbor Peninsula, Key Peninsula and portions of Tacoma, Fox Island, Washington and Olympia, Washington.

The station came on the air in 1988 and was one of three high school radio station in the state of Washington. The first manager and teacher was Don Hofmann, a former KNBQ-FM general manager. KSTW-TV technician Max Bice was the engineer. The last station manager was Spencer "Walrus" Abersold. As of June 2023, Abersold was let go of his position due to budget cuts.

The multi-format station is run by students at Peninsula High School and Gig Harbor High School during the day, and in the evening to night hours it is run by community volunteers. The station gives a variety of shows from the students which range from sports broadcasts to classic rock.

A variety of genres is played, including Jazz, Blues, Reggae, Roots & Americana, Classic rock and vintage music. As the station is also an educational tool for the students, KGHP also runs news briefs and fact segments, at various times throughout the day, along with taking requests via the phone. The station broadcasts Peninsula High School and Gig Harbor High School home varsity football games with the broadcasting crew called The Sports Guys. The station also provides emergency information during power outages, severe storms and natural disasters.

In November 2023, the Key Peninsula News reported that the Peninsula School District would consider transferring ownership of the station to a local non-profit organisation.
