= Henderson Bay High School =

Location
- 8402 Skansie Avenue; Gig Harbor, Washington 98332; United States; 47.3333°N 122.6032°W

Information
- Other name: HBH
- Type: Public alternative high school
- School district: Peninsula School District
- NCES School ID: 530669002463
- Principal: Brian Tovey
- Teaching staff: 9.00 FTE
- Grades: 9-12
- Enrollment: 146 (2019-20)
- Student to teacher ratio: 16.22
- Nickname: Bulldogs
- Website: hbh.psd401.net

Henderson Bay High School is a public alternative high school in Gig Harbor, Washington, United States. It is part of the Peninsula School District and located on the same campus as Gig Harbor High School.
