= Jock Gaynor =

American television actor and producer

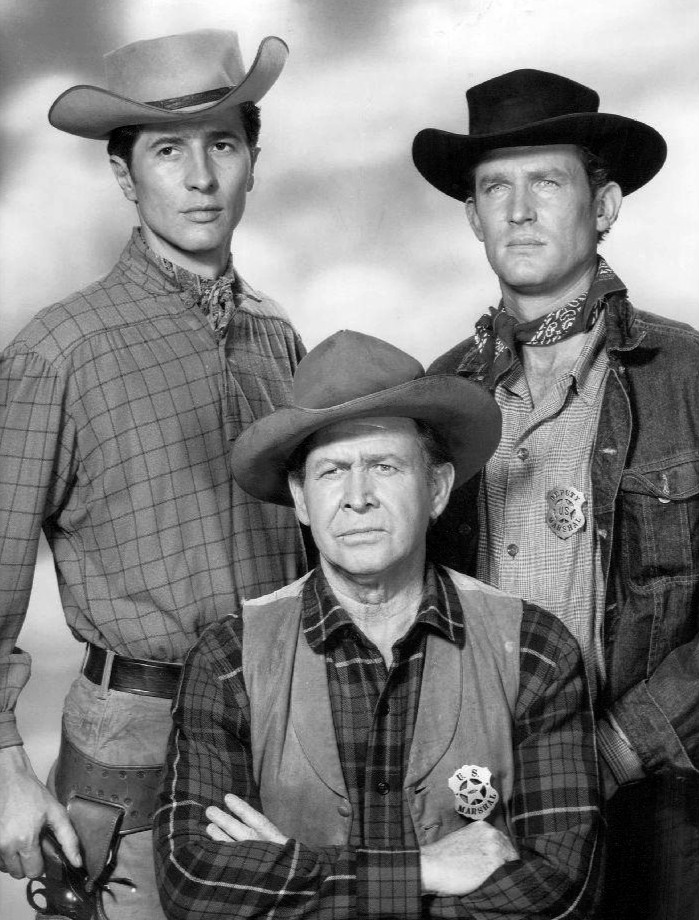
- Gaynor (left) with Barton MacLane and Don Collier in Outlaws, 1960
- Born: Jock William Gaynor; September 14, 1929; Queens, New York, U.S.
- Died: April 2, 1998 (aged 68); Los Angeles, California, U.S.
- Occupations: Television actor and producer
- Years active: 1960–1986
- Spouse: Grace Gaynor
- Children: 1

Jock William Gaynor (September 14, 1929 – April 2, 1998) was an American television actor and producer. He was known for playing the role of Deputy Marshal Heck Martin in the first season of the American western television series Outlaws.

== Life and career ==
Gaynor was born in Queens, New York, the son of Louise and Ira. His father was a police officer. He was introduced to public performance by playing the piano as a child. Gaynor served in the United States Air Force from October 25, 1950 to February 25, 1954. He also worked as an artist, professional baseball player and stage designer, working on plays, stock companies and television programs. Gaynor began his acting career in 1960, joining the cast of western television series Outlaws for its first season as Deputy Marshal Heck Martin. He was not liked by other cast members, his character did not appeal to the viewers, and he only appeared in nine episodes before being replaced by Wynn Pearce.

Gaynor continued appearing in television programs, with his credits including Voyage to the Bottom of the Sea, Rawhide, Mission: Impossible, Batman, The Life and Legend of Wyatt Earp, The Invaders, Iron Horse, Coronet Blue and Colt .45. His only film credit was starring in the 1974 film The Deathhead Virgin. Gaynor also played the recurring role of Dr. William Scott in the television soap opera The Doctors. He retired in 1986; his last television credit being in Knight Rider.

== Death ==
Gaynor died on April 2, 1998 in Los Angeles, California, at the age of 68.
