= Outlaws (1960 TV series) =

1960 TV series

- Genre: Western
- Starring: Barton MacLane; Don Collier; Jock Gaynor; Wynn Pearce; Bruce Yarnell; Slim Pickens; Judy Lewis
- Composer: Hugo Friedhofer
- Country of origin: United States
- Original language: English
- No. of seasons: 2
- No. of episodes: 50

Production
- Executive producer: Frank Telford
- Producers: Robert Bassler; Joseph Dackow; Frank Telford
- Running time: ca. 46 mins.

Original release
- Network: NBC
- Release: September 29, 1960 – May 10, 1962

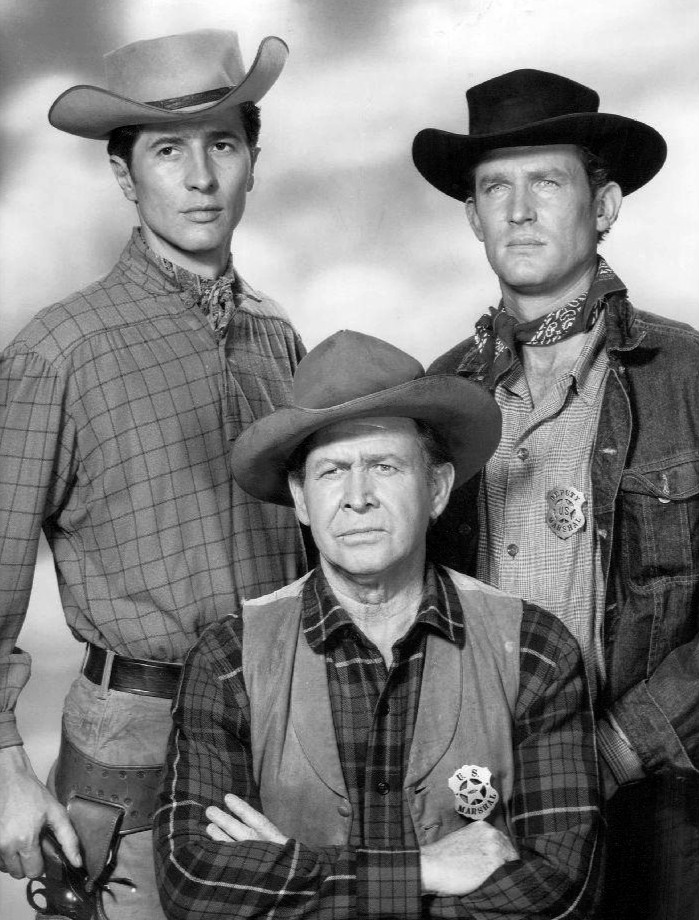
The original cast of Outlaws in 1960. Clockwise from top left: Jock Gaynor as Heck Martin, Don Collier as Will Foreman, and Barton MacLane as Frank Caine. Gaynor left the show after nine episodes and MacLane after the first season.

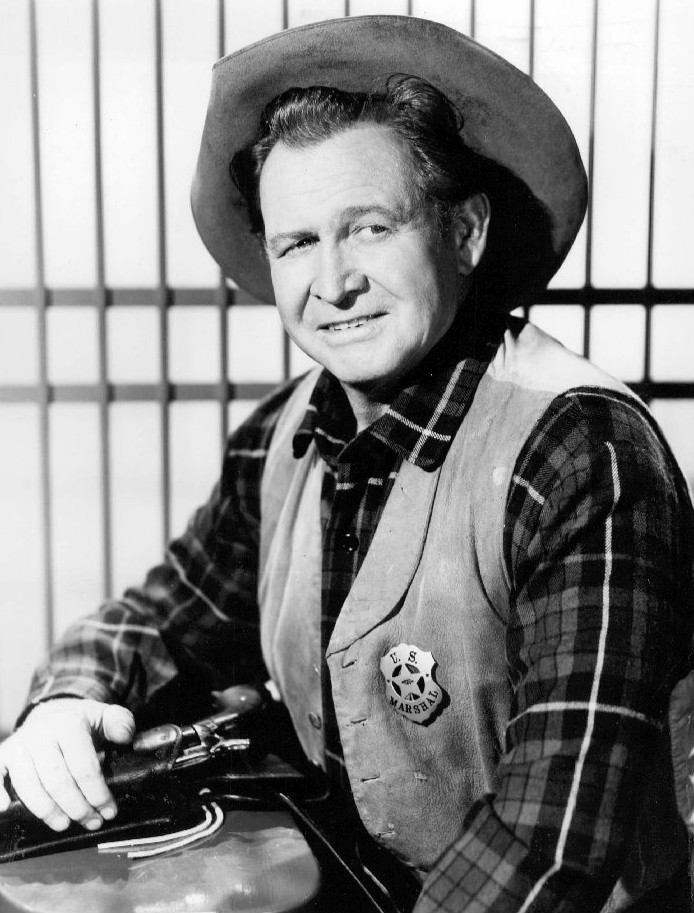
Barton MacLane

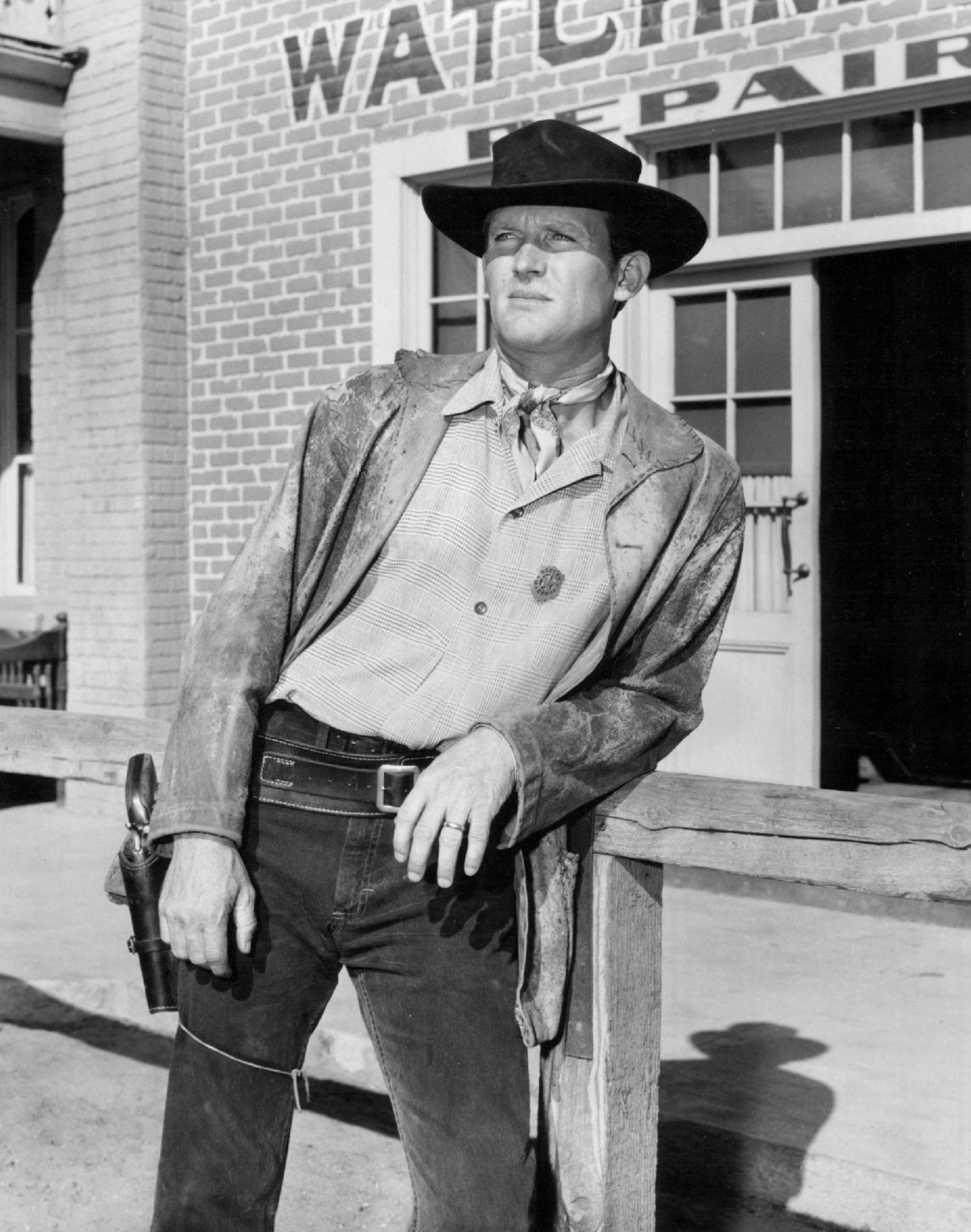
Don Collier

Outlaws is an American Western television series about lawmen pursuing criminals on the American frontier starring Barton MacLane, Don Collier, Jock Gaynor, Wynn Pearce, Bruce Yarnell, Slim Pickens, and Judy Lewis. The show aired on NBC during the 1960–61 and 1961–62 television seasons.

== Synopsis ==
During Season 1 (1960–61), Outlaws depicted United States Marshal Frank Caine and his deputies Will Foreman and Heck Martin, lawmen on the American frontier during the 1870s, 1880s, and 1890s. Based in Guthrie in the Oklahoma Territory, they pursue outlaws across the territory. After the first nine episodes, Martin disappears from Caine′s team and Deputy U.S. Marshal Steve Corbie replaces him. Rather than tell the story from the lawmen′s point of view, each episode depicts events from the viewpoint of the outlaws they are trying to bring to justice, a darker perspective that explores how the outlaws think, what motivates them to break the law, how they plot their crimes, and how they feel about getting caught by lawmen.

In Season 2 (1961–62), Caine has become the territorial governor, and he, Martin, and Corbie are gone from the series. Still enforcing the law in the Oklahoma Territory, Foreman has been promoted to marshal and now is based in Stillwater, pursuing outlaws with the assistance of his own deputy, Chalk Breeson. Stories are told from the point of view of the lawmen and honest citizens rather than from that of the outlaws. Episodes also portray events in Stillwater, where Slim is the town character who sometimes assists the marshals and Connie Masters works at the Wells Fargo office.

Outlaws sought greater historical accuracy than most television Westerns, depicting real-life outlaws such as the Dalton Gang, Bill Doolin, and Sam Bass and events such as the Land Rush of 1889 in some of its episodes.

== Cast ==
- Barton MacLane...U.S. Marshal Frank Caine (1960–1961)
- Don Collier...Deputy U.S. Marshal Will Foreman (1960–1961)/U.S. Marshal Will Foreman (1961–1962)
- Jock Gaynor...Deputy U.S. Marshal Heck Martin (1960 – 9 episodes)
- Wynn Pearce...Deputy U.S. Marshal Steve Corbie (1960–1961 – 17 episodes)
- Bruce Yarnell...Deputy U.S. Marshal Chalk Breeson (1961–1962)
- Slim Pickens...Slim (1961–1962)
- Judy Lewis...Connie Masters (1961–1962)

== Production ==
Outlaws was filmed at Metro-Goldwyn-Mayer and Paramount Pictures and Frank Telford served as its executive producer. Producers included Robert Bassler, Joseph Dackow, and Telford. Episode directors included Abner Biberman, Walter Doniger, John Florea, Douglas Heyes, Jesse Hibbs, Sobey Martin, Paul Stanley, and Richard Whorf. Episode writers included Doniger, Heyes, Lowell Barrington, Jack Curtis, Norman Katkov, Andy Lewis, Dave Lewis, and Corey Wilbur. Hugo Friedhofer wrote the show′s theme song.

Spike, the dog cast in the 1957 film Old Yeller, appeared in Outlaws. Other guest stars included Jack Elam, Eli Wallach, James Coburn, Warren Oates, Brian Keith, Gerald Mohr, Henry Hull, Jim Davis, Edgar Buchanan, Frank McHugh, Robert Culp, Nancy Kulp, Cliff Robertson, Leo Gordon, Fuzzy Knight, Julie Adams, Preston Foster, Alan Hale Jr., Robert Lansing, Lloyd Nolan, George Kennedy, Vic Morrow, Martin Landau, Jackie Coogan, William Shatner and Cloris Leachman.

Season 1 of Outlaws was filmed in black-and-white. Season 2 was in color.

Transogram produced a board game based on Outlaws.

== Reception ==
William Margulies was nominated for the Primetime Emmy Award for Outstanding Cinematography for a Single-Camera Series (One Hour) in 1961 for his work on Outlaws during its first season. At the 13th Primetime Emmy Awards, held on May 16, 1961, he lost to George T. Clemens of The Twilight Zone.

== Broadcast history ==
Outlaws premiered on September 29, 1960, and 26 episodes were produced for its first season, the last of them airing on May 18, 1961. After reruns aired during the summer of 1961, the second season premiered with a revised premise and cast on October 5, 1961, and consisted of 24 episodes. Despite the changes, the show was cancelled after its second season, and its last new episode was broadcast on May 10, 1962, seven weeks after its second-to-last new episode. Prime-time reruns of Outlaws then aired in its regular time slot until September 13, 1962. Outlaws aired on NBC on Thursdays at 7:30 p.m. Eastern Time throughout its 50-episode, two-season run.

== Episodes ==
=== Season 1 (1960–61) ===
No. overall	No. in season	Title	Directed by	Written by	Original release date
1	1	"Thirty a Month"	Joseph Leytes	Carey Wilber	September 29, 1960
Trail boss Rance Hollister worked for ten years to save $4,000 so that he could buy a spread of land, but when he finds out that the bank has failed and his savings are gone, he and his three trail hands rob a train and become wanted men. Guest stars: Steve Forrest, Robert Culp, Warren Oates, and Garry Walberg.
2	2	"Ballad for a Badman"	Sobey Martin	Carey Wilber	October 6, 1960
Chad Burns's gang has robbed many banks and trains, but the people of his town see him as a real-life Robin Hood and refuse to help the law by testifying against him. Guest stars: Cliff Robertson, Madlyn Rhue, Charles Aidman, Paul Hartman, Patricia Breslin, Jerome Cowan, James Dobson, Onslow Stevens, and Grandon Rhodes.
3	3	"Beat the Drum Slowly"	Walter Doniger	Jack Curtis	October 20, 1960
After a casino cheats them out of $3,500, two cowboys join a crooked judge who is planning to rob the casino — not realizing that the judge is a very murderous man. Guest stars: Vic Morrow, Dean Jones, and Ray Walston.
4	4	"Rape of Red Sky"	Douglas Heyes	Douglas Heyes	October 27, 1960
The town of Red Sky hangs a man without trial, learning soon afterward that he was innocent. The man's brother, Gabe Cutter vows to destroy the town, and works with a recently released outlaw and his recruits to rob its citizens of everything they have. Guest stars: Gerald Mohr, Skip Homeier, Jackie Coogan, Patricia Barry, Leo Gordon, Barbara Lang, William Bryant, Eugene Iglesias Joanna Heyes, Jeanne Bates, Robert Griffin, Duane Grey, Richard Reeves, Hal Hopper, Roscoe Ates, and Carleton Carpenter.
5	5	"Shorty"	Jesse Hibbs	Daniel Mainwaring	November 3, 1960
After a court orders him to allow other ranchers to herd their cattle along a trail through land he claims, rancher Jack Duane — a physically unimposing man with a quick draw — kills a neighboring rancher to show that no one can push him around, and then threatens to kill the only witness to the murder as well. Guest stars: Alfred Ryder, Hampton Fancher, Edward Binns, Vivi Janiss, and Robert Harland.
6	6	"Last Chance"	Richard Whorf	Andy Lewis	November 10, 1960
The only survivor of a band of outlaws who had been ambushed, bandit Harry Gannon returns to town seeking revenge, but decides instead to settle down with his sweetheart and go straight — and that goal that turns out to be harder to achieve than he thought. Guest stars: Jack Mullaney, John Larch, Elen Willard, Phillip Pine, and Bruce Gordon.
7	7	"Starfall (Part 1)"	Walter Doniger	Walter Doniger, Based on "Starfall" by John W. Cunningham	November 24, 1960
While the territorial government struggles to contain a range war in the Oklahoma Territory, four men long on the run together who have taken part in it are offered amnesty. However, a vengeful rancher they fought against, Clay Fisher, tries to maneuver them into violating the amnesty before it takes effect so that they will remain in trouble with the law. Guest stars: William Shatner, David White, Jack Warden, Adam Williams, Paul Richards, Edgar Buchanan, Pippa Scott, John Hoyt, Cloris Leachman, Ken Lynch, and John Anderson.
8	8	"Starfall (Part 2)"	Walter Doniger	Walter Doniger, Based on "Starfall" by John W. Cunningham	December 1, 1960
Although the Oklahoma Territory range war has ended, Clay Fisher′s plot to bring down four men who fought against him progresses as two of them plan to rob a bank after having no success in finding a job. Guest stars: William Shatner, David White, Jack Warden, Adam Williams, Paul Richards, Edgar Buchanan, Pippa Scott, John Hoyt, Cloris Leachman, Ken Lynch, and John Anderson.
9	9	"The Fortune Stone"	John Rich	Andy Lewis	December 15, 1960
Honest townspeople find a $100,000 diamond that had disappeared during a stagecoach robbery, and murderous criminals try to take the diamond from them. Guest stars: Gerald Mohr, Dianne Foster, and Edward Atienza.
10	10	"The Quiet Killer"	Sobey Martin	Carey Wilber	December 29, 1960
Disillusioned with trial by jury as a means of achieving justice after cattle rustlers caught red-handed repeatedly are acquitted, a United States marshal resigns, accepts payment from the head of a cattleman's association to kill the cow thieves, and becomes a bounty hunter. Based on a true story. Guest stars: Gene Evans, Phyllis Thaxter, Carleton Young, Fuzzy Knight, J. Pat O'Malley, Dan Frazer, Clegg Hoyt, and Johnny Washbrook.
11	11	"Return to New March"	Sobey Martin	Andy Lewis	January 5, 1961
The Great Plains Railroad announces plans to bypass the town of New March — where Foreman grew up — and build a company town 2 miles (3.2 km) away, a move which will destroy New March′s economy. Angry citizens of New March kill one of the railroad's employees, and Foreman receives a cold reception by the people of New March after he arrives to investigate the murder. More violence ensues after the railroad hires a ruthless killer to strike back at the town and its leaders. Guest stars: Julie Adams, Preston Foster, Gene Lyons, Barry Kelley, Reedy Talton, Karl Swenson, John Pickard, Paul Sorenson, Ken Mayer, and Andy Albin.
12	12	"The Waiting Game"	Unknown	Unknown	January 19, 1961
After a gang held up a bank in Topeka, Kansas, 15 years earlier and made off with a huge amount of money, its members had decided to wait for a number of years before dividing the money up among themselves. To prevent any of them from getting the money ahead of time, they had ensured that each of them knew only part of the information necessary to find the money. Now they have made plans to gather together, find the money, and divvy it up. The marshals hope that the daughter of one gang member who had been killed after the original robbery will help them trap the surviving members of her late father's gang, but greed complicates the plans of both the outlaws and the lawmen. Guest stars: Alan Hale, Jr., Edward Andrews, Larry Gates, Fred Beir, and Constance Ford.
13	13	"The Daltons Must Die (Part 1)"	Walter Doniger	Walter Doniger	January 26, 1961
The five Dalton brothers, all deputy U.S. marshals, pursue a dangerous killer named Red Buck and his two henchmen, Lucky and Willie. The outlaws kill Frank Dalton, leaving the surviving Dalton brothers wondering if their marshal's pay is worth it. Guest stars: Larry Pennell, Robert Lansing, Joan Evans, Chris Robinson, Charles Carlson, and Bill Tennant.
14	14	"The Daltons Must Die (Part 2)"	Walter Doniger	Walter Doniger	February 2, 1961
Embittered after a jury fails to convict their brother Frank's killers, the four surviving Dalton brothers take the law into their own hands to avenge his death, and then plan the robbery of a United States Army payroll. Guest stars: Larry Pennell, Robert Lansing, Joan Evans, Chris Robinson, Charles Carlson, and Bill Tennant.
15	15	"Assassin"	Dick Moder	Story by : Daniel Mainwaring; Teleplay by : Dick Nelson	February 9, 1961
When Caine and Foreman investigate the murder of a deputy in a town run by a ruthless saloon owner, Caine's first move is to shut down some dubious establishments in the town — so the saloon owner hires a young gunman to kill Caine. Guest stars: Dean Stockwell, Kevin Hagen, Jennifer West, Edmon Ryan and Ray Jones.
16	16	"Culley"	Allen Reisner	Unknown	February 16, 1961
After a man shoots his own father, a drifter named Culley Scott kills the man in self-defense. Culley finds a satchel of money on the dead man's horse and discovers that the dead man's father is still alive. After Caine and Foreman apprehend him, Culley tells them that he is the old man's son, and then decides to help him when he learns the old man is now blind. Guest stars: Henry Hull, James Coburn, John Milford, Sue Ane Langdon, Judson Pratt, Vito Scotti, James Griffith and George Sowards.
17	17	"The Bill Doolin Story"	Unknown	Unknown	March 2, 1961
Ranch foreman Bill Doolin and his fellow ranch workers are left jobless when the ranch owner sells his land to the railroad. A railroad agent offers Doolin money to capture an old friend who has become a train robber, but Doolin turns down the offer, and instead he and the other former ranch workers consider joining the train robber's gang. Guest stars: Joe Maross, Jacques Aubuchon, Wright King, Jean Allison, and Jim Beck.
18	18	"The Bell"	Paul Stanley	Jack Curtis	March 9, 1961
After Jim Houston — an ex-convict just released from prison — joins Foreman on the road while Foreman is taking sadistic killer Neil Gwinner to prison, Gwinner offers Houston money to help him escape. A blizzard strikes, the horses are spooked, and Gwinner escapes. Foreman finds shelter from the storm in a church and tells the people inside that a killer has escaped, but passes out before he can mention Houston. When Houston arrives at the church, the people assume that he is Gwinner. Guest stars: Simon Oakland, Jack Lord, John Howard, Ray Daley, Parley Baer, Phyllis Hill, and Bennye Gatteys.
19	19	"No More Pencils — No More Books"	Unknown	Unknown	March 16, 1961
Needing money to improve his school and frustrated by the town council's refusal to give the school the financial support he thinks it needs, mild-mannered schoolteacher Darius Woodley decides to impress his girlfriend with his manliness by joining forces with a dangerous criminal in a scheme in which he tricks the council's three members into entering a cave and leaves them there as captives of the outlaw. He then reports that a wanted man is holding the councilmembers for ransom — and he plans to collect the ransom money and use it to fund his school. Guest stars: David Wayne, Tom Gilson, and Patricia Barry.
20	20	"Blind Spot"	Abner Biberman	Norman Katkov	March 30, 1961
After an outlaw known as "The Weasel" kills a man, his 13-year-old son, Davey Morgan, vows revenge, and gunman Frank Denton gives the boy shooting lessons to prepare him to kill The Weasel. Guest stars: Gary Merrill, Roger Mobley, Lisabeth Hush, Harp McGuire, Ed Wilson, Howard Wormser, Howard McLeod, and V. J. Ardwin.
21	21	"Outrage at Pawnee Bend"	Unknown	Unknown	April 6, 1961
After years of seeing attempted train robberies fail, two railroad employees plan to rob a train of a million dollars by making an entire boxcar disappear. Guest stars: Paul Ford, Frank McHugh, and Jonathan Harris.
22	22	"The Avenger"	Paul Stanley	James Lee Barrett	April 13, 1961
A gunman wants to bring in certain outlaws alive if possible — including one that helped to murder a member of his family. Guest stars: Vic Morrow, Martin Landau, Randy Sparks, and Jeanette Nolan.
23	23	"The Sooner"	Unknown	Unknown	April 27, 1961
Gregor Zacod is an impoverished farmer who supplements his meager income by hiding wanted criminals. When three men offer to pay him to take them to the hiding place of a member of their gang who kept all the money for himself after a robbery, Zacod refuses. The men respond by kidnapping his wife so that they can force him to cooperate with them — and he plots to enact his own brand of justice on them. Guest stars: Cesare Danova, Stacy Harris, James Chandler, Joan Tetzel, Robert Carricart, Joseph Ruskin, and Henry Rowland.
24	24	"Sam Bass"	Unknown	Jack Curtis	May 4, 1961
Everyone in town turns against daydreaming young ne'er-do-well Sam Bass after he inadvertently causes an outlaw to gun down the sheriff, so he decides to join up with the outlaw — and before long, he decides to form his own outlaw gang. Guest stars: Jack Chaplain, Dennis Patrick, Walter Burke, Cal Bolder, Gregg Palmer, and Margarita Cordova.
25	25	"The Brothers"	Unknown	David E. Lewis	May 11, 1961
Embittered because he has a disabled hand, Jim Kelly falls further and further into life as an outlaw, and he drags his gentle, slow-witted, but physically powerful and loyal brother Maury into it with him. Guest stars: Richard Rust, Charles Briggs, Christine White, and Jim Davis.
26	26	"The Little Colonel"	John Peyser	Lowell Barrington	May 18, 1961
After Caine and Foreman enter Mexico in pursuit of three outlaws, they stop at the first town they reach to ask the permission of the Mexican authorities to enter Mexico and continue the chase — but instead of granting them permission, the colonel who runs the town jails them, planning to use them as a bargaining chip to get concessions from his superiors in the Mexican government. Guest stars: Ralph Manza, Craig Curtis, Rafael Campos, Ted Markland, and Anna Navarro.

=== Season 2 (1961–62) ===
No. overall	No. in season	Title	Directed by	Written by	Original release date
27	1	"Chalk's Lot"	Unknown	Clair Huffaker	October 5, 1961
With Caine gone to serve as governor of the Oklahoma Territory, Foreman is promoted to marshal and moves to Stillwater, where he appoints an unlikely pair of new deputies. He takes up his new duties just as the United States Government opens the territory to settlement and triggers the Land Rush of 1889, and Foreman and his new deputies face the challenge of maintaining order amid an influx of "Sooners" making their claims to land in the territory. The new deputies also claim land, but a dishonest saloon owner and gambler named Charlie Peal takes advantage of their poor knowledge of the details of the law. After Peal swindles Slim out of a piece of real estate, Breeson talks Foreman into attempting a series of unusual legal maneuvers designed to return the property to Slim. Guest stars: David White, Cindy Robbins, Robert Karnes, and Tom Symonds.
28	2	"The Connie Masters Story"	Unknown	William D. Gordon	October 12, 1961
Connie's ex-husband, who she had thought was dead, arrives in Stillwater and blackmails her into helping him rob the Wells Fargo bank where she works, telling her that he will reveal to her the location of the son she has not seen since he was a baby if she helps with the robbery. Guest stars: Cliff Robertson, Charles Fredericks, and Lincoln Demyan.
29	3	"My Friend, the Horse Thief"	Paul Stanley	Clair Huffaker	October 19, 1961
A cowboy named Whip — an old friend of Breeson's who Breeson has idolized since childhood — arrives in town, and the townspeople take a liking to him. As Foreman investigates a series of horse thefts, however, he notes that Whip has been near the scene of every theft and begins to suspect him of taking the horses — but Breeson refuses to believe that Whip could be guilty. Guest stars: Brian Keith, Judson Pratt, Anthony Hall, John Astin, Pat McCaffrie, Michael Carr, and Earl Parker.
30	4	"The Cutups"	John Peyser	Andy Lewis & David E. Lewis	October 26, 1961
Posing as practical jokers, two conmen from the city trick Slim into holding up the Express Office. Slim winds up in jail while the two conmen divide the loot between themselves. Guest stars: Ray Walston, Bruce Gordon, Joan Camden, Dale Hill, and Garth Benton.
31	5	"Night Riders"	Unknown	William D. Gordon	November 2, 1961
An organization of hooded night riders recruits frustrated local farmers, telling them that a conspiracy of foreigners is responsible for a fall in the price of wheat. Soon the farmers join them in a terror campaign of whippings and arson — and Slim becomes one of their targets when he refuses to give in to their demands. Guest stars: Robert J. Wilke, Dick York, and Jena Engstrom.
32	6	"The Braithwaite Brothers"	Unknown	Clair Huffaker	November 9, 1961
Just after three brothers deposit their life savings in the bank in Stillwater, a robbery drains the bank of its money. The brothers want their money back, and plan a robbery of their own. Guest stars: Lonny Chapman, Conlan Carter, and Harry Raybould.
33	7	"Walk Tall"	Unknown	Andy Lewis	November 16, 1961
An immigrant garbage collector's son falls in love with the daughter of a wealthy woman who is determined to stop them from being together — and the young man also discovers that some of his associates have plans to use a phony cattle sale to swindle the woman. Guest stars: Paul Carr, Nina Shipman, Katherine Warren, Joe Brown, Robert Fortier, Stephen Joyce, and Charles Hradilac.
34	8	"Roly"	Unknown	Unknown	November 23, 1961
After a dying robber leaves a large amount of money on the farm of Roly McDonough, Roly decides to keep the money and use it to do good for people — but his efforts lead only to misery for himself and those he tries to help. Guest stars: David Wayne, Dianne Foster, and Barbara Stuart.
35	9	"No Luck on Friday"	Paul Stanley	Carey Wilber	November 30, 1961
A struggling rancher, a fancy hat salesman, and an embezzler team up to rob $100,000 from an armored wagon — and the robbery leads to murder. Guest stars: Vic Morrow, Gerald Mohr, and Wright King.
36	10	"The Outlaw Marshals"	Unknown	Unknown	December 14, 1961
Three marshals from a cattlemen's association in Wyoming come to take custody of Foreman's wounded prisoner, who they accuse of murder. After they beat the prisoner in his cell and Foreman and his deputies listen to the man's story, they decide not to turn the man over to the marshals, even though their decision defies the marshals' legal authority. Guest stars: Myron McCormick, Emile Meyer, Ken Lynch, Jack Elam, Pat McCaffrie, and William Fawcett.
37	11	"Masterpiece"	Unknown	Unknown	December 21, 1961
A banker angrily rejects a painter's honest but unflattering portrait of him and refuses to pay him for it, so the painter teams up with a locksmith to rob the bank to get his money. Guest stars: Walter Slezak, Howard K. Smith, and Harry Townes.
38	12	"The Verdict"	Unknown	Unknown	December 28, 1961
Breeson is found unconscious in a stable along with a dead man — the son of wealthy Tom Holbrook — whose gun is still in its holster. Breeson's gun has been fired twice, and the dead man has been shot twice. Breeson has no memory of what happened during the previous ten hours, but must find a way to prove his innocence. Guest stars: Russell Thorson, Carleton Young, Jan Merlin, and Pippa Scott.
39	13	"The Dark Sunrise of Griff Kincaid, Esquire"	Cliff Robertson	Andy Lewis & Cliff Robertson	January 4, 1962
Blind lawyer Griff Kincaid comes to Stillwater to provide legal help to farmers being exploited by a greedy land syndicate. Thanks to his charisma and oratorical skills, most of the townspeople come to trust him, but Foreman harbors doubts about Kincaid's true motives. Kincaid soon runs for mayor, planning to use the office to pursue his own selfish goals. Guest stars: Cliff Robertson, Elisha Cook Jr., Robert H. Harris, Joyce Jameson, Edward Asner, Nancy Kulp, Warren Kemmerling, Reta Shaw, John Banner, Garry Walberg, and Curt Barrett.
40	14	"The Bitter Swede"	Unknown	Unknown	January 18, 1962
A farm girl from Minnesota arrives in Stillwater with plans to marry Sven Johanssen, a man she had desired since childhood. She finds that Sven has become a wild and free-living man who has no intention of settling down with a woman — and that he is hijacking shipments of whiskey so that a saloon owner can sell it to the Indians. Guest stars: Brian Keith, Erika Peters, Myron Healey, and Ken Drake.
41	15	"Buck Breeson Rides Again"	Paul Stanley	Andy Lewis	January 25, 1962
Alternative title "The Old Man." Chalk Breeson's father Buck — who has a history of swindling and conning people — arrives in Stillwater. Chalk is nervous about Buck's visit, but Buck's assertion that he has decided to give up his life of crime delights Chalk — until Buck joins two other men in a stock swindling scheme and tries to get Chalk involved as an accomplice. Guest stars: Lloyd Nolan, Bruce Gordon, and John Abbott.
42	16	"A Bit of Glory"	Jesse Hibbs	Preston Wood and Cecil Don Hansen	February 1, 1962
Foreman and Breeson join Sheriff Ned Danvers in the search for an escaped outlaw named Spangler. Danvers is up for reelection, and he must capture Spangler if he is to win. The man running against Danvers also wants to catch Spangler — and has far less concern than Danvers over how many people are killed in the process. Guest stars: Eli Wallach, Jerome Cowan, Larry Chance, Dean Harens, Joan O'Brien, Dee Pollock, Lew Gallo, Wallace Rooney, Will Wright, Rusty Lane, Arthur Peterson, Steven Terrell, and Norman Leavitt.
43	17	"Horse of a Similar Color"	Unknown	Unknown	February 8, 1962
Slim trades six horses to two Pawnee men for an Appaloosa that he plans to ride in a big upcoming horse race in Stillwater. Although Slim later discovers that the horse will throw any rider who is not Pawnee, he decides to ride it in the race anyway — and a dishonest gambler hoping to fix the race so that he can take most of the money bet on it believes that Slim's horse will help him fulfill that hope. Guest stars: Tony Terry and Ron Trujillo.
44	18	"The Sisters"	Fred Hamilton	Unknown	February 15, 1962
Shortly after the Wells Fargo bank in Stillwater is robbed and one of its tellers is killed, two tomboyish sisters enter the bank and attempt to deposit $12,000. Foreman is certain that the girls' father robbed the bank and sent the girls to deposit the stolen money, so Connie takes charge of the girls while Foreman waits for their father to come to Stillwater to reclaim them and take the money out of the bank — but things go differently than Foreman had planned. Guest stars: Olive Sturgess, Gina Gillespie, Jackie Coogan, Arthur Hunnicutt, and Carl Crow.
45	19	"A Day to Kill"	Unknown	Unknown	February 22, 1962
Two refugees from Cuba — brothers Frank and Carlos Vincente — plan to assassinate a Cuban ambassador when he passes through Stillwater. They know the United States Government will guard him heavily — and expect to die themselves. Guest stars: Alejandro Rey, Mario Alcaide, Harry Townes, and Vincent Padula.
46	20	"No More Horses"	Andrew McCullough	Robert Vincent Wright	March 1, 1962
After arriving in Stillwater in a horseless carriage, con man Morgan Mayberry talks prominent citizens of the town into investing $25,000 in a horseless carriage factory. He also plans to use a horseless carriage as a getaway car. Guest stars: Richard Long, John Fiedler, and Mike Kellin.
47	21	"Ride the Man Down"	Unknown	Carey Wilber	March 8, 1961
While pursuing a wanted outlaw, Breeson enters No Man's Land, a lawless strip of land under no state's or territory's jurisdiction. After suffering a wound, he tries to flee, but finds little help, meeting only an immigrant peddler and his son who fear getting involved in anyone else's affairs. Meanwhile, Foreman and Slim set out to search for Breeson — and the unofficial boss of No Man's Land puts out a bounty on Breeson to send a message that no lawman will be allowed to leave No Man's Land alive. Guest star: Henry Jones.
48	22	"Farewell Performance"	John Florea	William D. Gordon	March 15, 1961
Just after Thomas Healy, the head of a traveling Shakespearean acting troupe, deposits $20,000 in the bank at Edendale, all of his money is lost in a bank robbery. Healy decides to make up for his losses by having his troupe rob the bank in Stillwater while performing there, avoiding suspicion by making it look like the gang that robbed the Edendale bank had also robbed the bank in Stillwater. He also talks Slim and Breeson — who is attracted to Healy′s daughter — into appearing in his show, leaving only Foreman on duty and making it easier for the troupe to rob the bank. Healy abandons his plan when Foreman captures the Edendale gang and recovers the money it stole — but one member of Healy′s troupe decides to go through with the Stillwater robbery anyway. Guest stars: Myron McCormick, Ruta Lee, Myron Healey, George Kennedy, Phil Chambers, Robert B. Williams, and Bill Hickman.
49	23	"Charge"	John Florea	Dave Lewis and Andy Lewis	March 22, 1962
While in jail for disorderly conduct, demoted United States Cavalry sergeant Ben Thompson tells Foreman and Breeson about how he and two other demoted cavalry sergeants — Frank Burling and Myles Ree — had pursued a group of renegade Indians armed with a Gatling gun, and how during the chase the three men had come across a cave thought to hold ancient treasure from a Spanish expedition. The episode was the unsold pilot for a television series to have been named Outpost. Guest stars: Claude Akins, Frank de Kova, Jay Lanin, Christopher King, Jeff York, Dayton Lummis, Rodd Redwing, Jody Fair, Iron Eyes Cody, Charles Kephart, and Paul Carr.
50	24	"All in a Day's Work"	Unknown	Jack Curtis & Andy Lewis	May 10, 1962
After Foreman learns that a paroled outlaw plans to come to Stillwater to kill him, he finds his efforts to be on guard against the attack frustrated when he has to deal with many complaints from townspeople over less serious matters. Meanwhile, a man arrives in town and claims to be a deputy sent to help Foreman, but he displays an attitude that makes the citizens of Stillwater suspicious of him. Guest stars: Alan Hewitt and Gene Lyons.
