= Peninsula School District =

School district in Gig Harbor, Washington

Coordinates: 47.3056°N 122.6780°W

The Peninsula School District is the main school district for the city of Gig Harbor, Washington, USA and the unincorporated areas around Gig Harbor and the Key Peninsula. These areas include Artondale, Arletta, Rosedale, Purdy, Wollochet, Vaughn, Lakebay, Longbranch, Home, Wauna, Crescent Valley and the Kopachuck area.

== High schools ==
- Gig Harbor High School
- Peninsula High School
- Henderson Bay Alternative High School

== Middle schools ==
- Goodman Middle School – leads into Gig Harbor High School Website
- Kopachuck Middle School – leads into Gig Harbor High School Website
- Harbor Ridge Middle School – leads into Peninsula High School Website
- Key Peninsula Middle School – leads into Peninsula High School Website

== Elementary schools ==
- Harbor Heights Elementary School – leads into Goodman Middle School
- Discovery Elementary School – leads into Goodman Middle School
- Voyager Elementary School – leads into Kopachuck Middle School
- Artondale Elementary School – lead into Kopachuck Middle School
- Evergreen Elementary School – leads into Key Peninsula Middle School
- Minter Creek Elementary School – leads into Key Peninsula Middle School
- Purdy Elementary School – leads into Harbor Ridge Middle School
- Vaughn Elementary School – leads into Key Peninsula Middle School
- Swift Water Elementary School – leads into Harbor Ridge Middle School

== Superintendent ==
Robert Manahan was the superintendent of the Peninsula School District from July 2016 through 2018. Art Jarvis was the interim superintendent of the Peninsula School District from 2018 to 2020. As of July 2021, Krestin Bahr has served as superintendent.

Krestin Bahr previously worked at Tacoma Public Schools, where she served as the head of middle schools and as the Regional Director for Mt. Tahoma. Bahr was also the superintendent for Eatonville School District in 2013.

== Board of directors ==
Peninsula School District has 5 districts, and therefore 5 directors that serve the Gig Harbor area. The president of the board is Lori Glover of district 3, while the vice president is Natalie Wimberly. Other members include Chuck West, Jennifer Butler, and David Olson. Many of the school board members are former military members, or former firefighters, in the case of West.
