= Bruce Yarnell =

American film, television, theatre actor and singer (1935–1973)

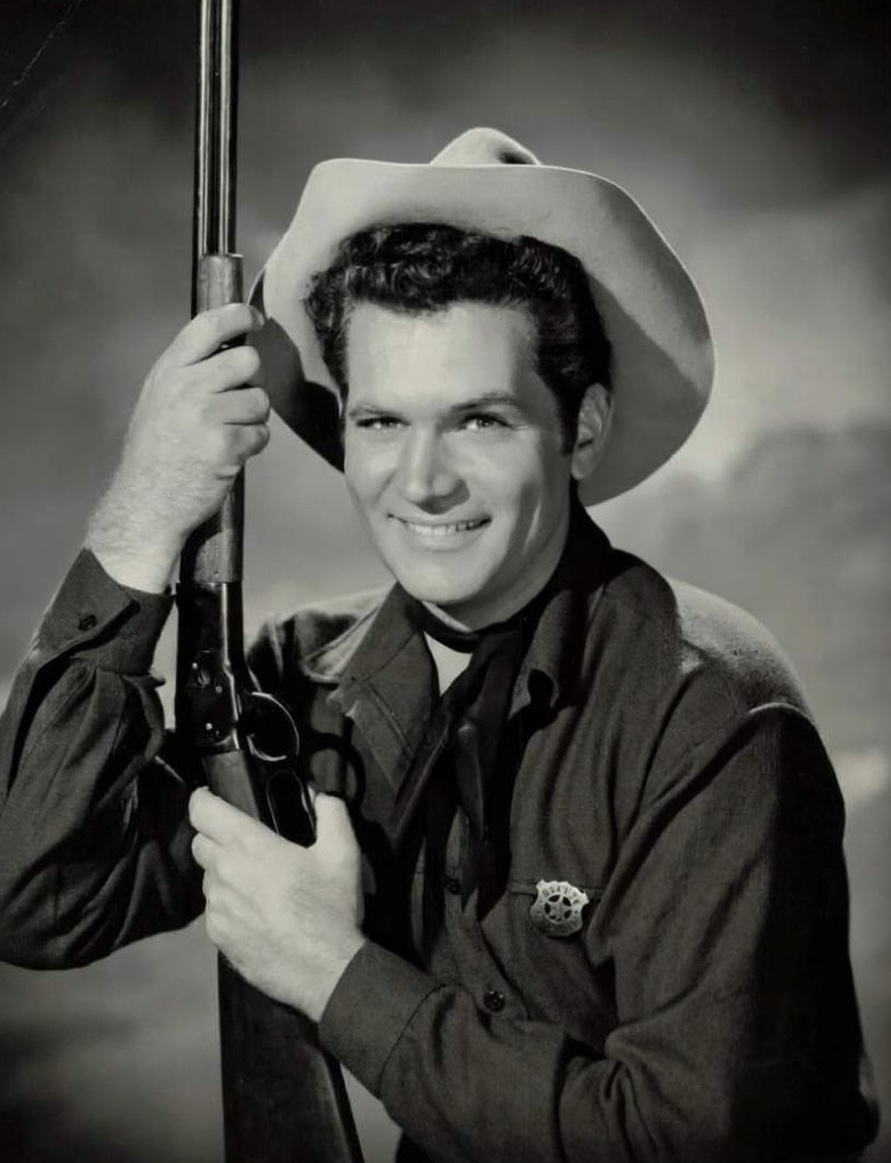
- Yarnell in Outlaws, 1961
- Born: Bruce Patane Altomari Yarnell; December 28, 1935; Pasadena, California, U.S.
- Died: November 30, 1973 (aged 37); Los Angeles County, California, U.S.
- Cause of death: Airplane crash
- Burial place: San Fernando Mission Cemetery, Los Angeles, California, U.S. 34.2739557°N 118.4643770°W
- Occupations: Actor; singer
- Spouses: Frances Chadwick (m. 1957; div. 1971) Joan Patenaude (m. 1972)
- Children: 3
- Family: Lorene Yarnell (sister)

Bruce Patane Altomari Yarnell (December 28, 1935 – November 30, 1973) was an American actor and singer. He was best known for playing in the final season of the American western television series Outlaws. As a baritone, he performed in musicals such as Annie Get Your Gun, Bye Bye Birdie, Carousel, and Oklahoma!.

== Life and career ==
Yarnell was born in Pasadena, California, the son of Marie and Harold, a police officer. He was the older brother of dancer and actress Lorene Yarnell. He studied opera and later sang at the Earl Carroll Theatre in Los Angeles. He also sang in Reno, Nevada, where he was later joined by the Mormon Choir in numerous musical productions. Yarnell made his theatre debut in 1960 on Broadway, in Camelot as Sir Lionel.

His screen career began soon afterwards, when he joined the cast of the NBC western television series Outlaws in 1961, for its final season, playing Deputy Marshal Chalk Breeson. That same year, he starred in the Broadway musical The Happiest Girl in the World as General Kinesias, for which he won the 1961 Theatre World Award. He continued to appear in films and television programs including Irma la Douce (1963), Bonanza (1964–1965), and Hogan's Heroes (1965). He also starred as Billy Bigelow in the 1966 New York City Center Light Opera Company production of Carousel, as Frank E. Butler in the same year's Broadway revival of Annie Get Your Gun, as Curly McLain in the 1969 Little Theatre's production of Oklahoma! – both at the New York State Theater; and as Matt Reedy in the 1968 action film The Road Hustlers.

Yarnell later played leading roles at the San Francisco Opera House. His last credit was in a tour of Bye Bye Birdie at the Santa Monica Civic Auditorium in November 1973.

== Personal life ==
Yarnell's first wife was Frances Chadwick, a model; the two married on May 25, 1957. They divorced in March 1971 after having three daughters: Heather, Therese and Waverly. He then married Joan Patenaude, a soprano, on July 15, 1972.

== Death ==
Yarnell was a pilot and flew himself to his engagements. In the night of November 30, 1973, Yarnell was piloting a single-engine plane from San Francisco to Hollywood Burbank Airport and crashed into a mountain slope near Gorman, California, northwest of Los Angeles. He died with his two passengers, Terri and David Wirsching, a police officer from Burbank. His last message was that he had electrical power problems and became disoriented. Yarnell was interred in San Fernando Mission Cemetery.

=== Legacy ===
In 1979, Yarnell's second wife, Joan, created an award called the "Bruce Yarnell Memorial Award", given by Opera Philadelphia to an outstanding baritone, bass-baritone or bass.
