= Raonall Smith =

American football player (born 1978)

No. 57, 56
- Position: Linebacker

Personal information
- Born: October 22, 1978 (age 48); Mesa, Arizona, U.S.
- Listed height: 6 ft 4 in (1.93 m)
- Listed weight: 220 lb (100 kg)

Career information
- High school: Peninsula (Gig Harbor, Washington)
- College: Washington State
- NFL draft: 2002: 2nd round, 38th overall pick

Career history
- Minnesota Vikings (2002–2005); St. Louis Rams (2006–2007)

Awards and highlights
- Second-team All-Pac-10 (2001)

Career NFL statistics
- Total tackles: 97
- Sacks: 2.5
- Fumble recoveries: 4
- Pass deflections: 3
- Interceptions: 1
- Stats at Pro Football Reference

Raonall Carrig Smith (/ˈrænəl/; born October 22, 1978) is an American former professional football player who was a linebacker in the National Football League (NFL). He was selected by the Minnesota Vikings in the second round of the 2002 NFL draft and also played for the St. Louis Rams. Smith played college football for the Washington State Cougars.

== Early life ==
Smith attended Peninsula High School in Gig Harbor, Washington and was an honor student and a letterman in football, basketball, and baseball. In football, he was a first team all-State selection as a junior and senior. Raonall Smith graduated from Peninsula High School in 1996. He was nicknamed "The Oven" on the baseball field, because he had a cannon from center field. Played select baseball for the Tacoma Stags and was an all-tournament selection at the NABF World Series in 1994 in Northville, Michigan.

== NFL career statistics ==
Legend
**Bold**	Career high

Year	Team	Games		Tackles					Interceptions					Fumbles			
Year	Team	GP	GS	Cmb	Solo	Ast	Sck	TFL	Int	Yds	TD	Lng	PD	FF	FR	Yds	TD
2003	MIN	7	0	2	2	0	0.0	0	0	0	0	0	0	0	1	0	0
2004	MIN	7	3	27	22	5	0.0	1	**1**	**19**	0	**19**	**2**	0	0	0	0
2005	MIN	**16**	**6**	**35**	**28**	7	1.0	**3**	0	0	0	0	1	0	**2**	0	0
2006	STL	**16**	0	31	23	**8**	**1.5**	2	0	0	0	0	0	0	1	0	0
2007	STL	4	0	2	2	0	0.0	0	0	0	0	0	0	0	0	0	0
		50	9	97	77	20	2.5	6	1	19	0	19	3	0	4	0	0
