= The Road Hustlers =

1968 film

- Directed by: Larry E. Jackson
- Written by: Robert V. Barron; Larry E. Jackson
- Produced by: Larry E. Jackson; Tom Jenkins; Robert M. Newsom
- Starring: Jim Davis; Scott Brady; Bruce Yarnell
- Cinematography: Gerhard Maser
- Edited by: Roy V. Livingston
- Music by: Michael Colicchio
- Production company: Saturn Productions
- Distributed by: American International Pictures
- Release date: March 28, 1968
- Running time: 94 minutes
- Country: United States
- Language: English

The Road Hustlers is a 1968 American action film directed by Larry E. Jacksonand starring Jim Davis, Scott Brady and Bruce Yarnell. It was shot on location in North Carolina.

== Cast ==
- Jim Davis as Noah Reedy
- Scott Brady as Earl Veasey
- Bruce Yarnell as Matt Reedy
- Robert Dix as Mark Reedy
- Victoria Carroll as Nadine
- Andy Devine as Sheriff Estep
- Sue Raney as Helen
- Robert V. Barron as Luke Reedy
- Theodore Lehmann as Hagar
- John 'Bud' Cardos as Chandler
- Bill McKinney as Hays
- Bill MacDowell as Bassett
- Jack Lester as Eskie
- Sid Lawrence as Deke
- Derek Hughes as Ted
- Monica Davis as Martha Lu
- Marshall Lockhart as Nelly
- Jim E. Quick as Imhoff
- Jack Morey as Harrison
- Byrd Holland as Agent

== Bibliography ==
- Balducci, Anthony. Richard Pryor in Hollywood: The Narrative Films, 1967-1997. McFarland, 2018.
