= Peninsula High School (Washington) =

Coordinates: 47.386958°N 122.624036°W

- 14105 Purdy Dr NW; Gig Harbor, Washington 98332 United States

Information
- Type: Public
- Motto: Together
- Established: 1947
- Principal: Dr Josh Zarling
- Staff: 65.18 (FTE)
- Enrollment: 1,395 (2023-2024)
- Student to teacher ratio: 21.40
- Colors: Green & White
- Mascot: Seahawks
- Nickname: Seahawks
- Information: (253) 858-0772
- Website: http://phs.psd401.net/
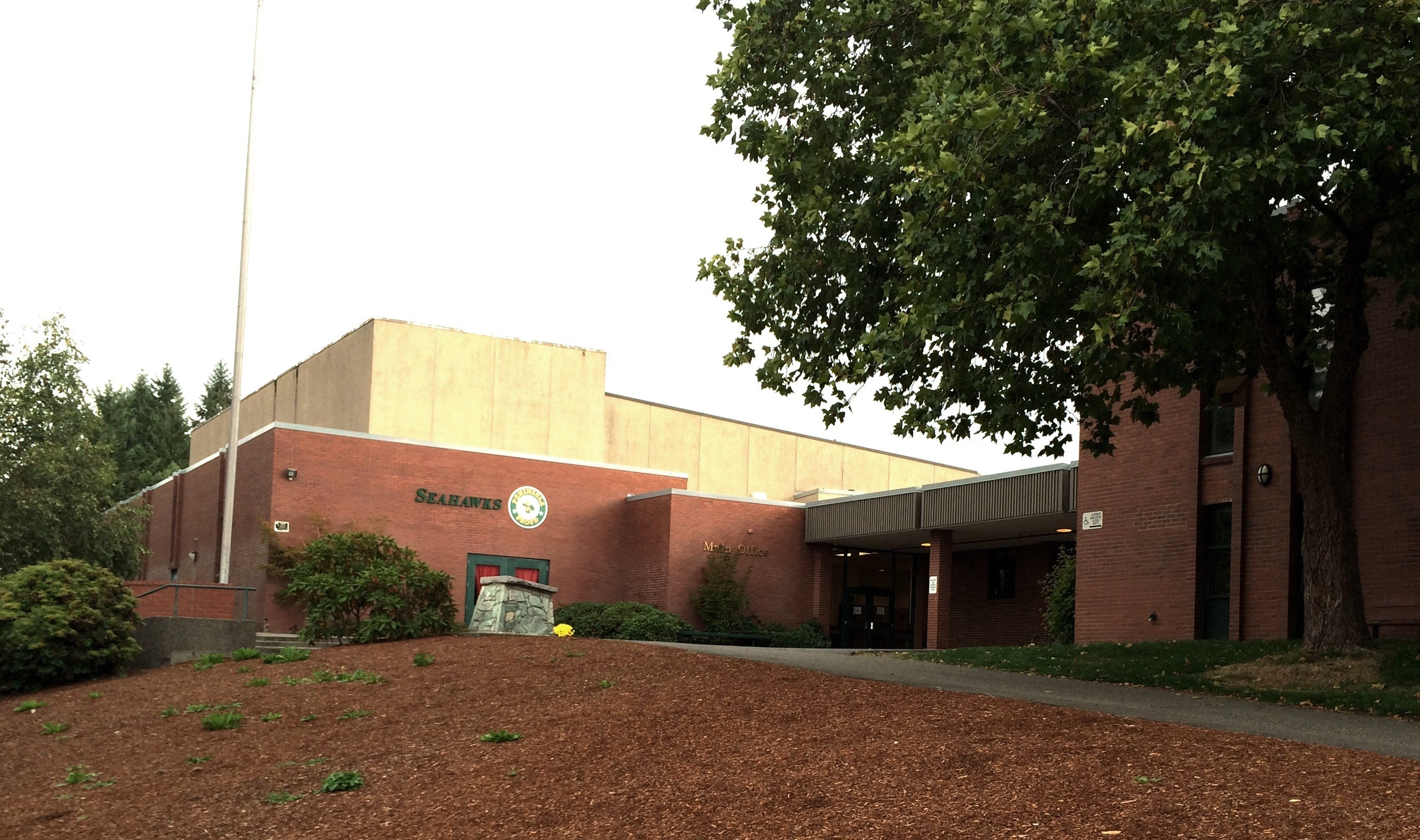

Peninsula High School is a public high school on a hill overlooking Henderson Bay and Burley Lagoon in Purdy, Washington, U.S. The school is part of the Peninsula School District.

== History ==
Peninsula High School was built in 1947 in its current location above Burley Lagoon on Purdy Drive. At the time it was the only high school serving the Gig Harbor Peninsula and Key Peninsula. After Gig Harbor High School was opened in September, 1979, 4 miles to the south, students living south of North Harborview Drive in downtown Gig Harbor and Fox Island attended the new high school.

== Athletics ==
Peninsula has many sports and club sports including, Baseball, Boys & Girls Basketball, Cross Country, Fastpitch, Football, Girls Bowling, Golf, Boys & Girls Soccer, Boys & Girls Swimming & Diving, Boys & Girls Tennis, Track & Field, Volleyball, Water Polo, and Wrestling. The boys cross country team recently earned second place at the 3A state meet, the highest placing by a Peninsula team since the baseball team in 2006. The Peninsula High School football team were the state 3A football champions in 1978. Larry Lunke was the head coach. The 2012 team was beaten in the semi-finals of the 3A State Championships by Bellevue, who then went on to win the title over North Bend, Washington's Mount Si Wildcats. This was the Bellevue Wolverines' 11th straight state title. The football team also won back-to-back SPSL 3A championships in their 2012 and 2013 seasons, both wins were over the Lakes Lancers of nearby Lakewood, Washington.

== Programs, clubs, and activities ==
Peninsula has many clubs and organizations including ASB, ASL Leadership, Band, Cheerleading, Chess Club, Choir, Competitive Robotics, DECA, Debate, Dignity Club, Drama, Drivers Education, Environmental Club, FBLA, GSA, Honor Society, Key Club, KGHP (high school radio station), Knowledge Bowl, Math Club, Model United Nations, Newspaper, Onomatopoeia Press Literary Magazine, Photo Club, Science Club, Speech and Debate, Sports Information Club, TATU (Teens Against Tobacco Use), NJROTC, TEAM (Teens Empowered Against Meth), Teens For Life, Trap Shooting, Varsity Club, and Yearbook.

=== KGHP-FM ===
- KGHP-FM

== Notable alumni ==
- Doris Brown (1960) - Inducted into the USATF Hall of Fame in 1990. Second female inducted into United States Track Coaches Hall of Fame in 1999. Inducted into the National Distance Running Hall of Fame in 2002.
- Paul Skansi (1979) - played 8 seasons in the National Football League with the Seattle Seahawks
- Tom Sinclair, 1979 NCAA Javelin Champion, and state high school javelin record holder
- Mark Fuhrman - Attended PHS for one year before transferring to North Mason High School in Belfair. He is an American author and conservative talk radio host who, as a former detective in the Los Angeles Police Department (LAPD), found a bloody glove at the scene of the murder of Nicole Brown Simpson and Ronald Goldman. He also found a matching glove in the yard of O.J. Simpson's home.
- Raonall Smith (1996) - Played 6 seasons in the National Football League with the St. Louis Rams and the Minnesota Vikings.
