= Purdy Bridge =

- U.S. National Register of Historic Places
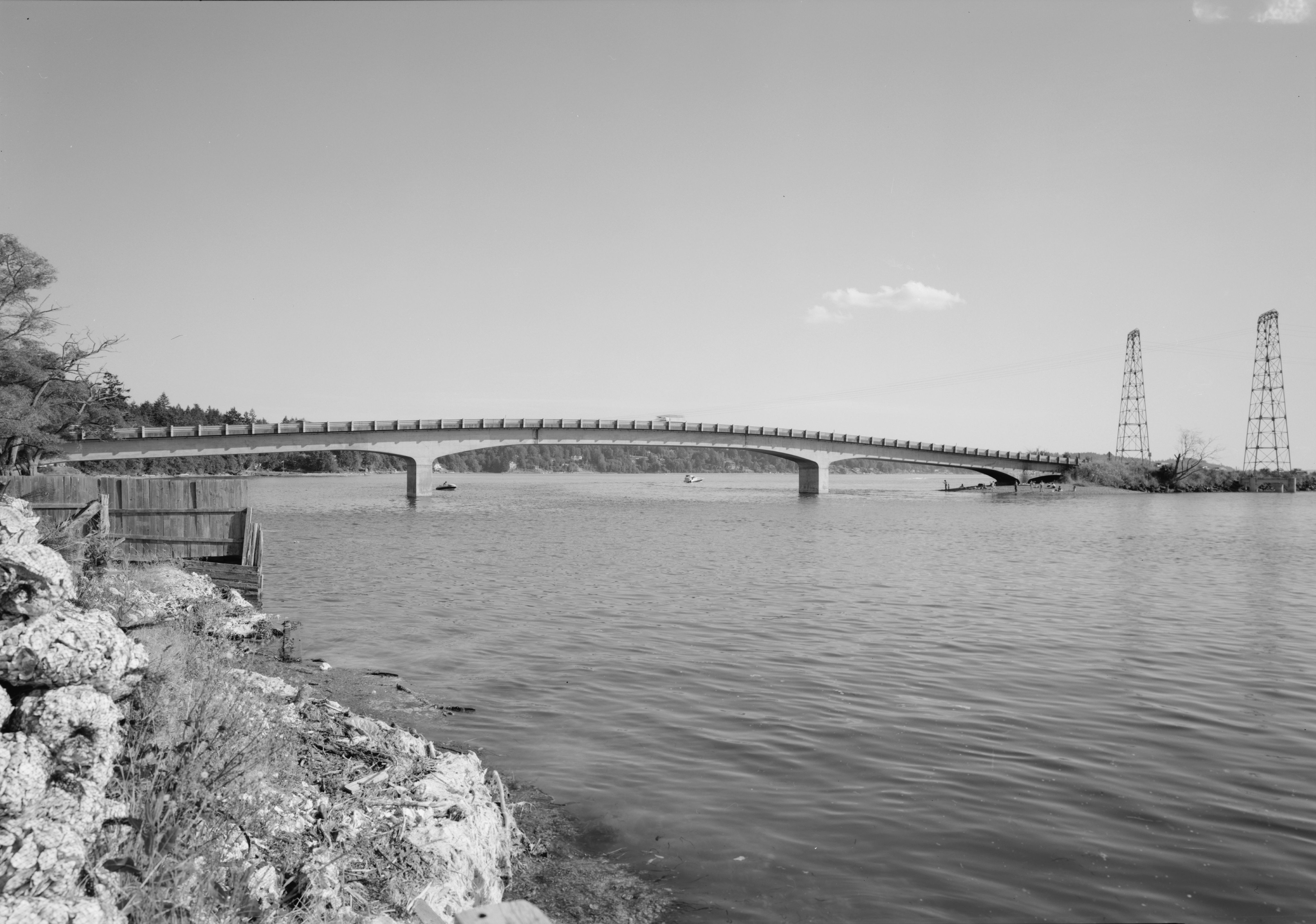

- Location within Washington (state)
- Location: Purdy, Washington
- Coordinates: 47°23′02″N 122°37′41″W
- Built: 1936
- Architect: W. H. Craft
- MPS: Historic Bridges/Tunnels in Washington State TR
- NRHP reference No.: 82004274
- Added to NRHP: July 16, 1982

The Purdy Bridge is a continuous reinforced concrete box girder bridge that spans 550 feet (170 m), with a central span of 190 feet (58 m), between Henderson Bay and Burley Lagoon. The bridge connects Purdy, Washington with the Purdy Sand Spit Park and Wauna, Washington.

Purdy Bridge was completed on September 29, 1937, at a cost of $62,000, from a design by Homer M. Hadley. It was the first bridge in the United States to utilize a reinforced-concrete box girder design and it was the longest continuous box girder bridge in the United States at the time.

The bridge was added to the National Register of Historic Places in 1982.

== See also ==
- List of bridges documented by the Historic American Engineering Record in Washington (state)
- List of bridges on the National Register of Historic Places in Washington (state)
- List of Registered Historic Places in Washington

== Sources ==
- Holstine, Craig E.; Hobbs, Richard (2005). Spanning Washington: Historic Highway Bridges of the Evergreen State. Pullman, Wash.: Washington State University Press. ISBN 0-87422-281-8. OCLC 58043209.
- Slater, Colleen A. (2007). The Key Peninsula. OCLC 1065553228.
