= Wynn Pearce =

American television actor (1929–1990)

- Pearce in Perry Mason, 1959
- Born: Henry Wynne Pearce Jr. November 7, 1928; Orange, Texas, U.S.
- Died: December 11, 1990 (aged 62); San Clemente, California, U.S.
- Education: University of Southern California
- Occupation: Television actor
- Years active: 1955–1990

Henry Wynne Pearce Jr. (November 7, 1928 – December 11, 1990) was an American television actor. He was known for playing the role of Deputy Marshal Steve Corbie in the first season of the American western television series Outlaws.

== Life and career ==
Pearce was born in Orange, Texas, the son of a physician. He served in the United States Army, later being discharged in 1954. Pearce began his career in 1955 in New York, in which he covered for actor, Andy Griffith in playing Captain Charles in the Broadway play No Time for Sergeants. He then played Arthur in the Broadway play Maybe Tuesday, in 1958. With his film and television career, Pearce joined the cast of the western television series Outlaws for its first season, in which he played the role of Deputy Marshal Steve Corbie, after Jock Gaynor left the series after nine episodes. Gaynor played the role of Deputy Marshal Heck Martin.

Pearce guest-starred in television programs including Gunsmoke, Bonanza, Steve Canyon, 12 O'Clock High, Perry Mason, Maverick, Tales of Wells Fargo, Sugarfoot, The Phil Silvers Show and 77 Sunset Strip. In 1968, he played the lead role of "Sir Charles Dilke" in Michael Dynes's presentation. Pearce attended the University of Southern California, earning his master's degree. After attending, he worked at the University of Arizona, where Pearce taught about theatre occupations such as, performing and directing. He also worked at the United States International University in San Diego, California, where he then later worked at the public community college Saddleback College, in which Pearce was an academic professor, from 1974 until his death from complications of a brief illness. Pearce never married nor had any children.

== Death ==
Pearce died on December 11, 1990, in San Clemente, California, at the age of 62. His body was cremated.
