= Howard McLeod =

Medical expert

Howard L. McLeod (born 1965) is an American pharmacogeneticist and implementation scientist specialized in precision medicine.

== Early life and career ==
McLeod was born in 1965, in Tacoma, Washington, and grew up in Gig Harbor, Washington. He graduated from Gig Harbor High School, where he was a member of a pre-grunge band The Potentials, and wrote the lyrics/music for their four-song EP.

He received his undergraduate degree in pharmacy at the University of Washington and his clinical pharmacology medical training (PharmD, 1988) from the University of the Sciences. He completed a clinical research fellowship at St Jude Children's Research Hospital and was a visiting academic scientist at the Beatson Institute for Cancer Research Glasgow University.

== Research ==
Since 1994, McLeod has been a tenured faculty member at University of Aberdeen, Washington University School of Medicine, the University of North Carolina at Chapel Hill, and the University of South Florida.

At Washington University in St. Louis, he was a professor in medicine and molecular biology and was the director of the Siteman Cancer Center Pharmacology Core. At UNC-Chapel Hill, he was the founding director of the UNC Institute for Pharmacogenomics and Individualized Therapy and held a Fred Eshelman endowed chair. He was a senior member at Moffitt Cancer Center, where he was also medical director at the De Bartolo Family Personalized Medicine Institute and Founding Chair of the Department of Individualized Cancer Management.

McLeod had a key role with the TPMT polymorphisms, including being responsible for establishing the relationship between TPMT enzyme activity in leukemia blast cells and red blood cells and identifying differences in mutation frequency and sequence across global populations. He has also been a pioneer in the use of ex vivo cell lines, such as immortalized lymphoblastoid cell lines, to discover novel gene associations with activity of anticancer drugs.

McLeod began international scientific collaborations in 1994, initially working with colleagues in Korle-Bu Teaching Hospital in Accra, Ghana, Kenyatta National Hospital, Nairobi, Kenya, and XiangYa Hospital in Changsha, China. From this work spawned the Pharmacogenetics for Every Nation Initiative (PGENI), which ultimately worked with 104 countries to bring local pharmacogenomic data into the national drug formulary decisions for essential medicines.

The then 20-year, longstanding research collaboration with XiangYa Hospital in Changsha China led to McLeod being one of the first western scientists to receive a Foreign 1000 Talent award. This award title has more commonly been used to recruit Chinese nationals to either move their research program in the west to China or to establish a comparable laboratory in China and the west.

In December 2019, McLeod was forced to resign from his position at Moffitt Cancer Center for allegedly improperly failing to disclose ties to the Chinese Thousand Talents Plan recruitment program. The CEO of the center was also forced to resign, along with four additional researchers.

== National service ==
McLeod was a member of the Food and Drug Administration (FDA) Center for Drug Evaluation and Research (CDER) Committee on Clinical Pharmacology from 2002 to 2013. He has also served in consultative roles for review of new drug applications for the Oncology Drugs Advisory Committee, the Gastrointestinal Advisory Committee, and Neurology section (carbamazepine-induced cutaneous adverse effects).

He has had a number of roles at the USA National Institutes of Health. He also had roles with the National Human Genome Research Institute, serving on the National Advisory Council, Chairing the External Scientific Panel for the eMERGE Network, and as a founding member of the Genomic Medicine Working Group.

== Business activities ==
McLeod is also a businessman, serving on the board of directors of both privately held and publicly traded companies (including Nasdaq: CGIX). He has founded a number of companies, such as Ortelion (Pharma Ethnobridging), Posterbolt (fabric scientific posters), Clariifi (precision oncology), and Interpares Biomedicine. Interpares Biomedicine won the BioFlorida 2017 BioPitch competition.

== Awards and honors ==
McLeod has received a number of awards, honors, and named lectureships, from academic organizations, Coriell Institute, the US Food and Drug Administration, and from Professional Societies.

- He received the FASCO title in 2020, which is the highest designation of the American Society of Clinical Oncology.
- He was also inducted as a fellow of the American College of Clinical Pharmacy in 2004.
- In 2020, according to expertscape.com, McLeod was the top ranked pharmacogeneticist in the US, and #2 globally.
