= Don Collier =

American actor (1928–2021)

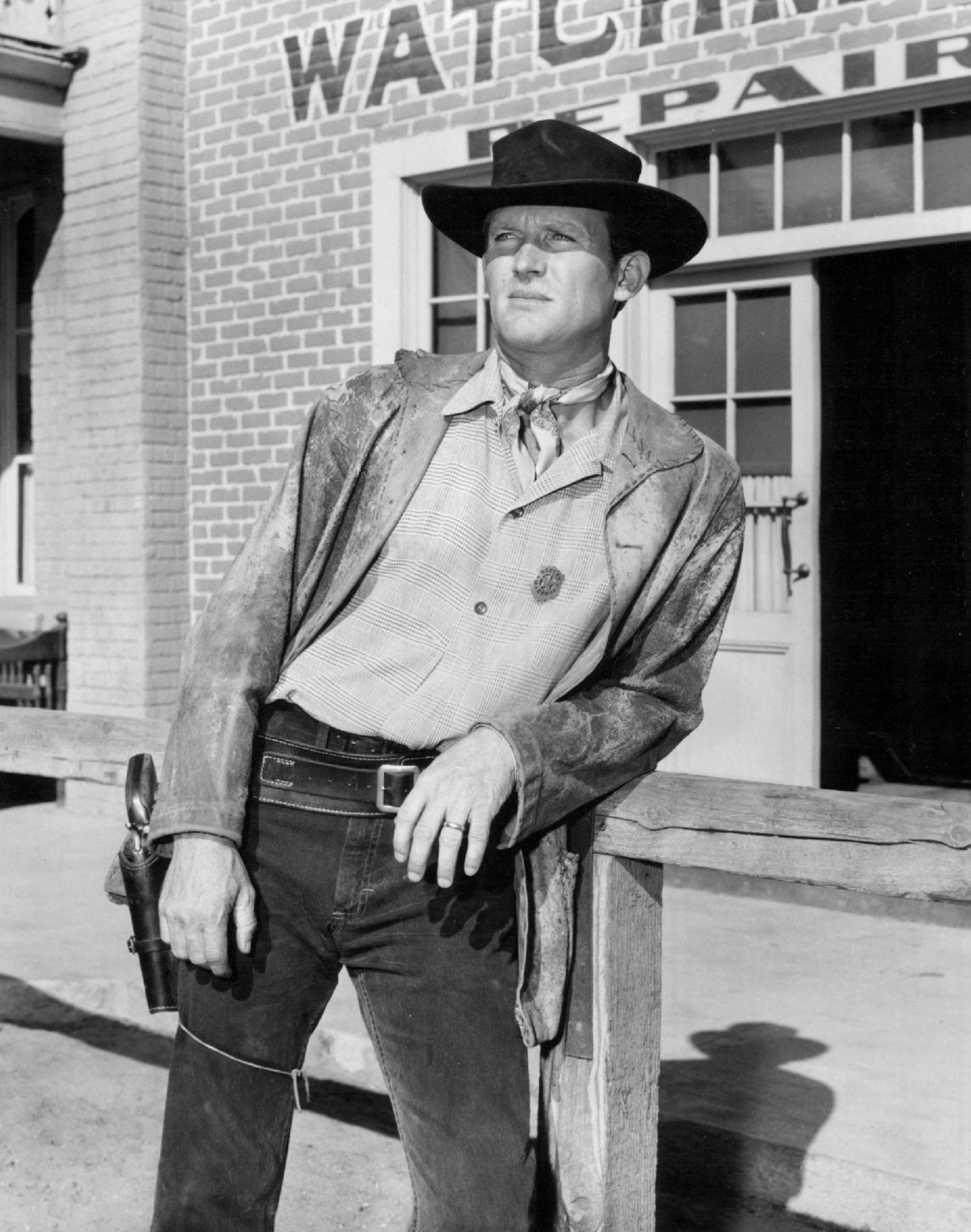
- Collier in a publicity photo for Outlaws (1960)
- Born: October 17, 1928; Santa Monica, California, U.S.
- Died: September 13, 2021 (aged 92); Harrodsburg, Kentucky, U.S.
- Education: Brigham Young University
- Occupation: Actor
- Years active: 1960–1997

Donald Mounger Collier (October 17, 1928 – September 13, 2021) was an American actor best known for Western films and NBC television shows such as The High Chaparral, Bonanza, Gunsmoke, and Outlaws as Marshal Will Foreman.

== Early years ==
Collier was born on October 17, 1928, in Santa Monica, California on the West Coast. He worked as a geologist, a logging hand, a ranch hand, and a surveyor and served in both the United States Navy and the Merchant Marine. After his naval service, Collier worked as an extra in a few films before attending small Baptist institution Hardin–Simmons College in Abilene, Texas, on an athletic scholarship. He did not return to college after his first year, but he later studied geology at Brigham Young University in Provo, Utah.

== Career ==
For about three years, Collier enhanced his acting skills through work with a drama group headed by Estelle Harman. He found favor with directors and producers because his ranch-hand background enabled him to do his own fighting and horseback riding and driving a wagon with a team of horses without the use of stunt doubles..

On television in several series, Collier portrayed ranch hand Sam Butler in The High Chaparral starring Leif Ericson, Cameron Mitchell, Henry Darrow, Mark Slade, Linda Cristal and Frank Silvera, set on the desert ranch in the old old Southwest and American frontier in the southern portion of the old Arizona Territory, near the U.S.-Mexican border in Apache Indian country, deputy Will Foreman in Outlaws, and William Tompkins in The Young Riders.

He also appeared in the two extended World War II historical epic miniseries The Winds of War (1983), and its sequel War and Remembrance (1988–1989), televised during the 1980s, based on the two earlier war / political historical fiction novels of the same titles in 1971, followed by the second in 1978, by acclaimed author Herman Wouk (1915–2019).

His more recent films also included several with star John Wayne: El Dorado (1966), Tombstone (1993), The War Wagon (1967), and The Undefeated (1969).

In the 1970s, Collier also began making occasional television commercials, including one for Hubba Bubba bubble gum that had him portraying the amusing character, the 'Gum Fighter" for eight years. In addition to his work in the United States, he also some TV made commercials in Australia, where he was easily recognized because of his films / television roles.

Later in his career, Collier narrated The Desert Speaks, a series of documentaries for the University of Arizona, appeared at Western festivals, and presented the one-man stage performance Confessions of an Acting Cowboy.

The film documentary biography and films review Don Collier: Confessions of An Acting Cowboy was released as a video on DVD in 2020.

== Personal life and death ==
Collier's marriage to Holly Hire, a casting director, ended with her death earlier in 2012. They had four children together. He died nine years after his wife from lung cancer in Harrodsburg, Kentucky, on September 13, 2021, at the age of 92.
