= Purdy, Washington =

Unincorporated community in Washington, United States

Purdy
- Census-designated place
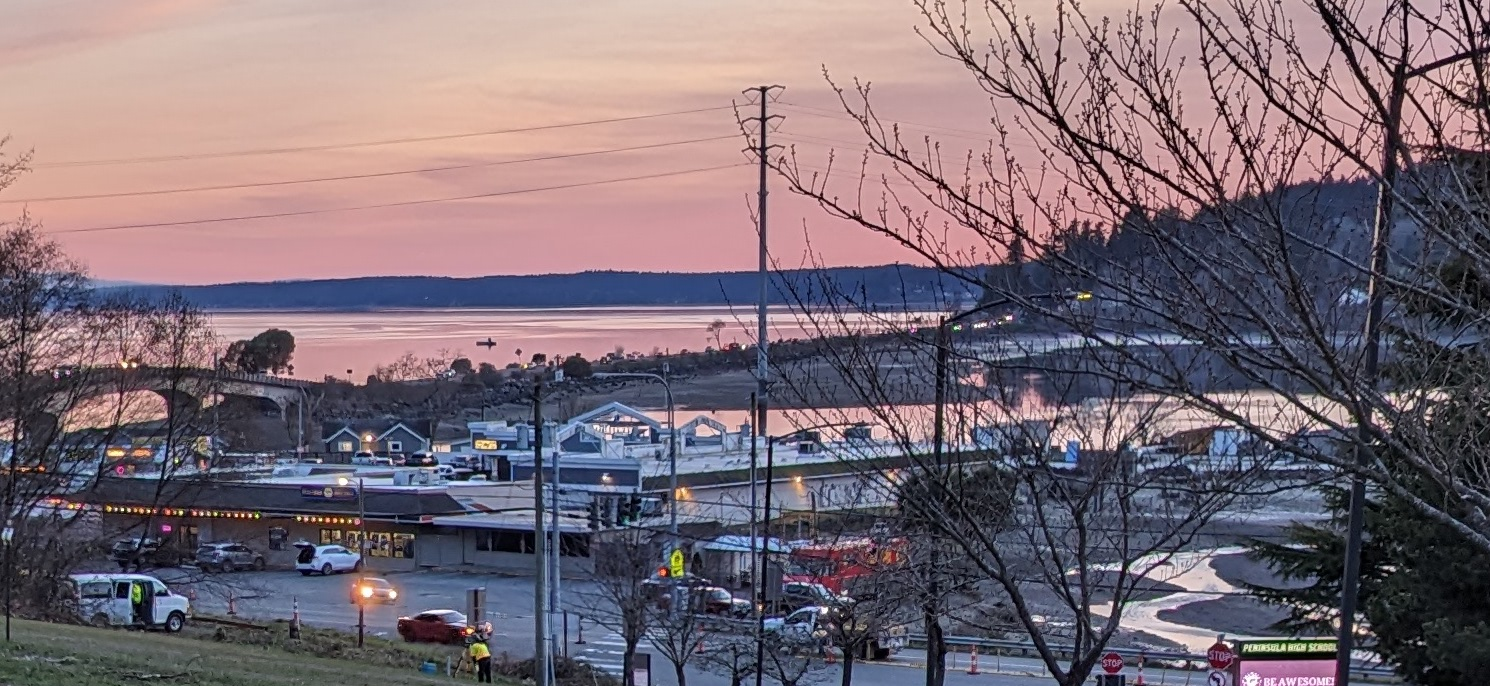
- The town of Purdy with the Purdy Bridge and Purdy Sandspit visible in the background

- Location within Washington (state)
- Coordinates: 47°23′20″N 122°37′20″W
- Country: United States
- State: Washington
- County: Pierce

Area
  - Total: 2.34 sq mi (6.1 km^{2})
  - Land: 2.34 sq mi (6.1 km^{2})
- Elevation: 292 ft (89 m)

Population (2010)
  - Total: 1,544
- ZIP code: 98332
- Area code: 253
- GNIS feature ID: 2585024

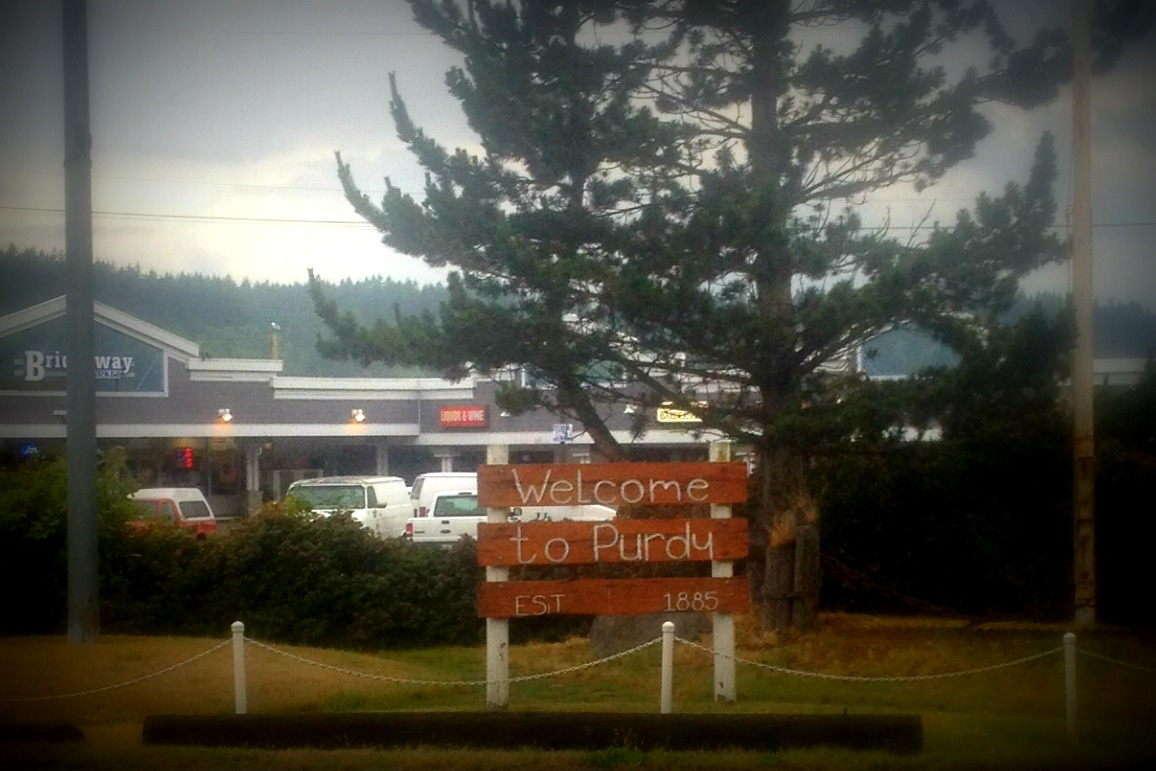
Purdy, Washington

Purdy is a small unincorporated community and census-designated place north of the city of Gig Harbor, and at the junction of Washington State Routes 16 and 302 on the northern boundary of Pierce County, Washington.

Purdy is on the shores of Burley Lagoon and Henderson Bay at the northern end of Carr Inlet in Puget Sound. The lagoon and bay are separated by a sandspit and the Purdy Bridge.

The Washington Corrections Center for Women, originally named the Purdy Treatment Center, is colloquially referred to as "Purdy", though it has a Gig Harbor address.

As of the 2020 census, Purdy had a population of 1,668.

== History ==
Prior to white settlement, the area was inhabited by Native Americans, who fished and clammed on Henderson Bay.

In 1884, one Isaac Hawk sold 19 acres (77,000 m^{2}) of land for $23.75 (equivalent to $851 in 2025). The purchaser was logger and Civil War veteran Horace Knapp (born March 23, 1845, in Titusville, Pennsylvania; died February 1, 1913, in Gig Harbor, Washington), who subdivided the land into lots and blocks to form the town of Purdy. The town's naming rights were taken by Joseph W. Purdy, a grocer from Tacoma, Washington, who had donated the materials to construct the community's first schoolhouse; the schoolhouse's land was donated by Knapp.

On February 8, 1885, Knapp married Josephine Fuller, after which they moved to the Purdy area, making her Purdy's first white female settler. Knapp owned a floating logging camp on Burley Lagoon which included a cookhouse and bunks for the loggers.

A mill was built in 1885 by James Ashton, Joseph Purdy, William Rowland, and a Mr. Sherman on a small inlet of Burley Lagoon just down the hill from present day Peninsula High School. In 1886, the Purdy mill secured its first contract to provide huge lumber with one edge beveled for the construction of a wooden dry dock at Puget Sound Naval Shipyard in nearby Bremerton. The mill could underbid their competitors because they used an extra saw to cut the bevel, which allowed them to use only four trips of the saw carriage instead of five.

Purdy became known as a "brawling mill town". The mill's success brought such conveniences as a grocery store and a post office to the area, the latter sited on Knapp's floating camp from 1886 to 1895 after which the function transferred to Springfield (Wauna, Washington). A long chute along present-day 144th Street brought logs down the hill to the water. Mr Ouellette, known as "the Frenchman", began canning native Olympia oysters gathered from his land on the Purdy spit around 1900. He gathered these native oysters to near extinction. Japanese oysters are still cultivated on Purdy's sandbars and in Burley Lagoon, as are clams.

The original schoolhouse was abandoned in the 1890s. In 1900, the second Purdy Schoolhouse was built to replace it on land (also donated by Knapp) located on Sherman Avenue (present-day 68th Avenue). Students spent every other semester at either the Purdy Schoolhouse, or the Wauna Schoolhouse to keep both schools active. The modern-day Peninsula High School now sits on the hill where one of the original schoolhouses was built. The Second schoolhouse stood until 2015, when it was demolished to build a new home.

== Demographics ==
Historical population
Census	Pop.	Note	%±
2010	1,544		—
2020	1,668		8.0%
U.S. Decennial Census; 2000 2010

Purdy first appeared as a census designated place in the 2010 U.S. census.

=== Racial and ethnic composition ===
Purdy CDP, Washington – Racial and ethnic composition Note: the US Census treats Hispanic/Latino as an ethnic category. This table excludes Latinos from the racial categories and assigns them to a separate category. Hispanics/Latinos may be of any race.
Race / Ethnicity (NH = Non-Hispanic)	Pop 2010	Pop 2020	% 2010	% 2020
White alone (NH)	1,383	1,366	89.57%	81.89%
Black or African American alone (NH)	9	23	0.58%	1.38%
Native American or Alaska Native alone (NH)	6	21	0.39%	1.26%
Asian alone (NH)	19	25	1.23%	1.50%
Native Hawaiian or Pacific Islander alone (NH)	2	3	0.13%	0.18%
Other race alone (NH)	1	17	0.06%	1.02%
Mixed race or Multiracial (NH)	55	87	3.56%	5.22%
Hispanic or Latino (any race)	69	126	4.47%	7.55%
Total	1,544	1,668	100.00%	100.00%

=== 2020 census ===
As of the 2020 census, Purdy had a population of 1,668. The median age was 47.3 years. 20.6% of residents were under the age of 18 and 29.2% of residents were 65 years of age or older. For every 100 females there were 94.0 males, and for every 100 females age 18 and over there were 92.9 males age 18 and over.

98.3% of residents lived in urban areas, while 1.7% lived in rural areas.

There were 701 households in Purdy, of which 27.1% had children under the age of 18 living in them. Of all households, 54.5% were married-couple households, 15.7% were households with a male householder and no spouse or partner present, and 25.8% were households with a female householder and no spouse or partner present. About 29.4% of all households were made up of individuals and 18.5% had someone living alone who was 65 years of age or older.

There were 740 housing units, of which 5.3% were vacant. The homeowner vacancy rate was 0.2% and the rental vacancy rate was 0.0%.

Racial composition as of the 2020 census
Race	Number	Percent
White	1,398	83.8%
Black or African American	23	1.4%
American Indian and Alaska Native	22	1.3%
Asian	27	1.6%
Native Hawaiian and Other Pacific Islander	3	0.2%
Some other race	68	4.1%
Two or more races	127	7.6%
