= Burley Lagoon =

Watershed on the Key Peninsula in the U.S. state of Washington

Coordinates: 47.39528°N 122.6317°W

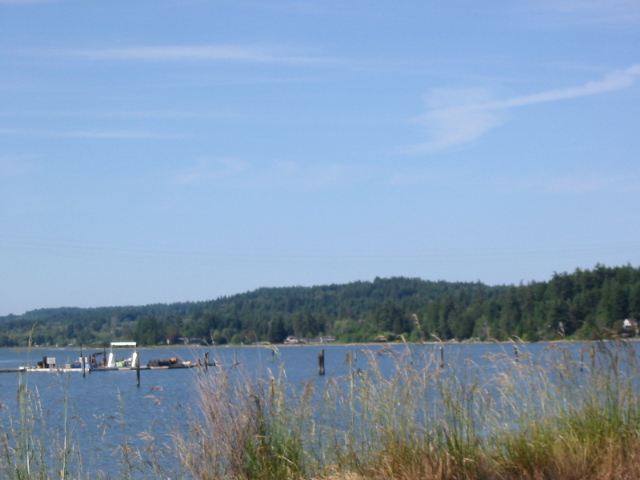

Burley Lagoon is a picturesque 358-acre (1.45 km^{2}) watershed located on the Key Peninsula in the U.S. state of Washington. The Purdy Bridge and Purdy Sand Spit separate Burley Lagoon from Henderson Bay at the northern end of Carr Inlet.

The unincorporated communities of Burley, Washington and Purdy, Washington rest on the shores of Burley Lagoon.

Approximately sixty percent of the lagoon (marine waters) is in Pierce County, Washington and forty percent in Kitsap County, Washington. The percentages in each county are reversed for the watershed uplands. All of the commercial shellfish acreage, which is owned by Western Oyster Company, is in Pierce County. Historically rural, the lagoon is experiencing rapid growth as more people move to the area.

== Environmental Concerns ==
The Washington State Department of Transportation is currently investigating the possibility of building a controversial bridge over Burley Lagoon.
