= Gig Harbor High School =

Coordinates: 47.330741°N 122.604981°W

- 5101 Rosedale St NW; Gig Harbor, Washington 98335 United States

Information
- Type: Public
- Motto: Roll Tides
- Established: 1979
- Principal: Bob Marshall
- Teaching staff: 52.71 (FTE)
- Grades: 9-12
- Enrollment: 1,375 (2024-2025)
- Student to teacher ratio: 26.09
- Colors: Navy, Columbia Blue & White
- Mascot: Poseidon
- Nickname: Tides
- Rivals: Peninsula High School and Bellarmine Preparatory School
- Website: ghh.psd401.net
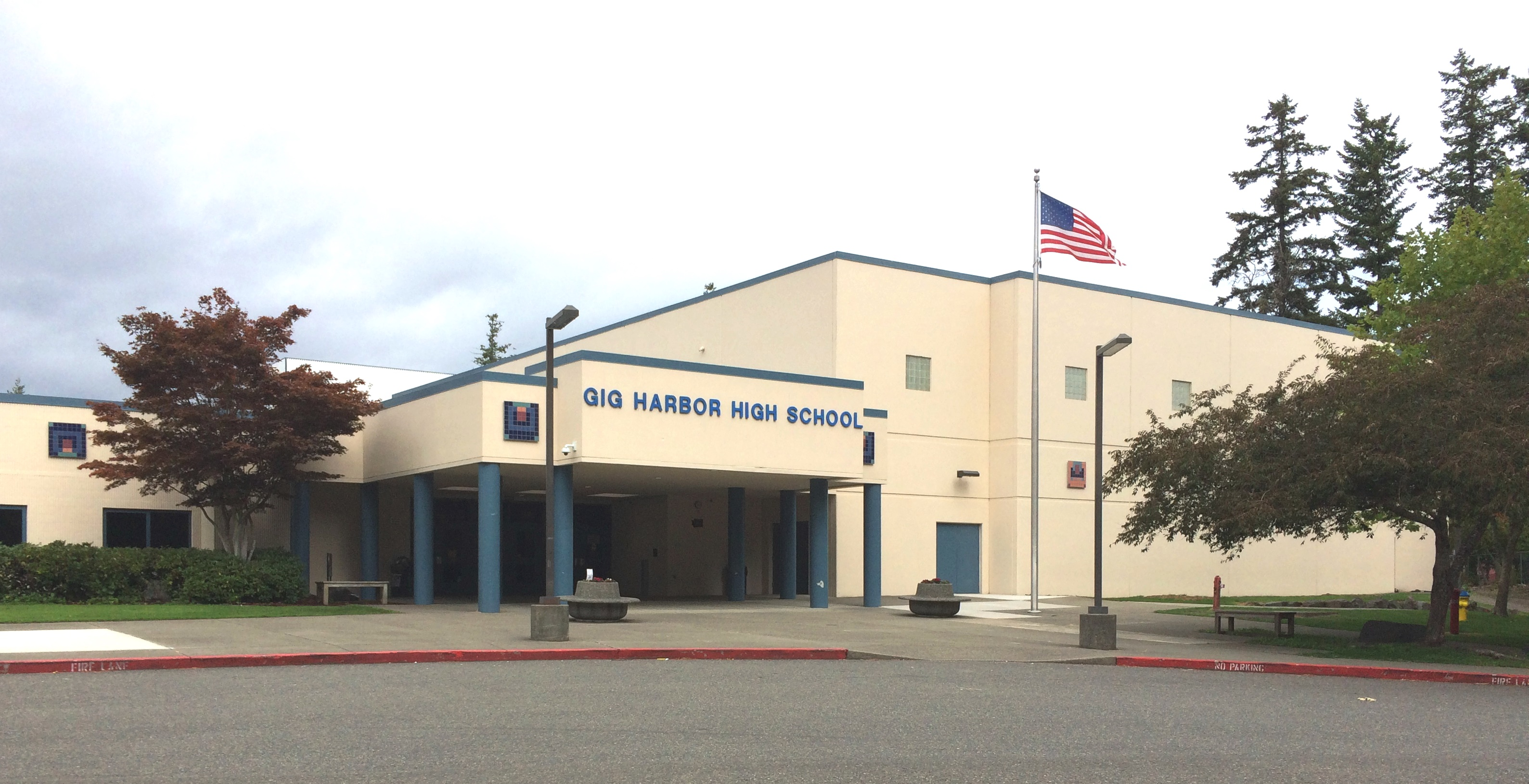
- Main entry (September 2015)

Gig Harbor High School is a public high school in the Peninsula School District in Gig Harbor, Washington. The school opened in September 1979. The school enrolls 1611 students (2017) in ninth through twelfth grades.

== School history ==
Gig Harbor High School (GHHS) opened its doors in the fall of 1979 as the second high school in the Peninsula School District. The first graduating class was in 1981. In an effort not to split up the senior class from cross-town Peninsula High School during the first year of operation, GHHS enrolled grades 8-11 during the inaugural 1979–1980 school year. As a result, the graduating class 1984 had the distinction to attend the school for five years.

The initial design concept of GHHS was based on the co-teaching model in which the classrooms offered flexibility to expand or sub-divide their spaces to accommodate large or small class groups.

In 1990, the school was renovated with a 120,000-square-foot, three-phase addition and remodel while occupied. Phase 1 consisted of a new Masonry classroom building, gymnasium, and a new science addition. Phase 2 was the complete renovation of existing space, including upgrading portions of the food service area and a new administration area. Phase 3 consisted of renovation of the old, remaining administration area into classrooms and a music area.

== Athletics and activities ==
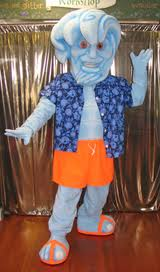
Tide Guy (school mascot)

Speech & Debate Team The speech and debate team attends both state and national tournaments yearly. It won the statewide tournament in the 2007–2008 season. The team participates in policy debate, LD (Lincoln-Douglas), Congressional Debate, Public Forum, various interpretation events, platform speaking and limited prep events.

Band The Gig Harbor Wind Symphony, Jazz Band, Concert Band, Symphonic Band, Pit Orchestra and Percussion Ensembles perform around three concerts per school year, as well as many different festivals and competitions throughout the year, along with being required to perform in the Pep Band. The Pep Band is present at each home football and basketball game, performing short songs in between game plays and at half time. They visited Coeur d'Alene, Idaho in May 2011 and performed there, winning three awards as a group and multiple individual student awards at a competition. Every other April, they perform at Disneyland in Anaheim, California. They attended the Festival of Gold in Chicago, Illinois in April 2019.

Cross-Country The Tides Cross-Country team has won numerous state titles, most recently three 4A boys titles in four years: 2011, 2013, and 2014, with the 2013 team additionally winning the Nike XC National Championship. The boys team previously made an appearance at NXN in 2011. The Tides girls had a run at the state 4A meet from 2005 to 2007 where they won three consecutive 4A state championships, narrowly missing further titles in 2004 (lost in a tiebreaker) and 2008 (lost by 1 point.) The girls also made an appearance at the NXN meet in 2005.

Football The Tides football team has won the Narrows League numerous times. In 2008, Gig Harbor lost to their cross town rival, Peninsula 33-0 and their league rival, South Kitsap 33–13. They finished 2nd in their league.

Tennis Both men's and women's teams have played in the Narrows league in the past few years.

Baseball The Tides baseball team were state champions in 1997. The Tides won their second title in 2017, beating Southridge in the championship game 5–1.

Track & Field Gig Harbor has won 11 total state championships in track and field since the school opened in 1980. The girls won Washington State AA titles in 1981, 1983, 1994, and 1995, with the boys winning in 1996.

The Tides boys won 4A titles in 2005, 2007, and 2012 with the girls winning in 2007 also. Gig Harbor was reclassified as 3A in 2017, and subsequently both boys and girls teams were state 3A champions in 2018.

Newspaper The school's newspaper is The Sound.

Water Polo The Tides water polo team has won three consecutive state champion titles as of 2012.

== Notable alumni ==
- Skip Williamson (class of 1982), music and film producer
- Howard McLeod (class of 1983), precision medicine scientist
- Dave Krusen (class of 1984), drummer, Pearl Jam
- Josh Lucas (class of 1989), actor
- Sam Scholl (class of 1996), college basketball coach for the Montana State Bobcats
- Cory Procter (class of 2001), former NFL offensive lineman
- Tally Hall, MLS (class of 2003), soccer goalkeeper
- Austin Seferian-Jenkins (class of 2011), NFL player
- Michael Toglia (class of 2016), MLB baseball player
- Davis Alexander (class of 2017), American and Canadian football quarterback
- Brynna Maxwell (class of 2019), professional basketball player
