= Wauna, Washington =

Unincorporated community in Washington, United States

Wauna
- census-designated place
- Location within the state of Washington
- Coordinates: 47°22′44″N 122°40′43″W
- Country: United States
- State: Washington
- County: Pierce

Area
  - Total: 6.39 sq mi (16.54 km^{2})
- Elevation: 305 ft (93 m)

Population (2010)
  - Total: 4,186
  - Density: 655.5/sq mi (253.1/km^{2})
- Time zone: UTC-8 (Pacific (PST))
  - Summer (DST): UTC-7 (PDT)
- ZIP codes: 98395
- GNIS feature ID: 2585051

Wauna is a census-designated place in Pierce County, Washington, United States. As of the 2020 census, Wauna had a population of 4,421.

== History ==
Originally platted as Springfield on September 14, 1889, Wauna's name was changed at the government's request, because of the many Springfields in Washington. Wauna, a Native American term for mighty water, was chosen as the new name by an early post mistress, Mary Frances White.

== Demographics ==
Historical population
Census	Pop.	Note	%±
2010	4,186		—
2020	4,421		5.6%
U.S. Decennial Census; 2000 2010

Wauna first appeared as a census designated place in the 2010 U.S. census.

=== Racial and ethnic composition ===
Wauna CDP, Washington – Racial and ethnic composition Note: the US Census treats Hispanic/Latino as an ethnic category. This table excludes Latinos from the racial categories and assigns them to a separate category. Hispanics/Latinos may be of any race.
Race / Ethnicity (NH = Non-Hispanic)	Pop 2010	Pop 2020	% 2010	% 2020
White alone (NH)	3,702	3,595	88.44%	81.32%
Black or African American alone (NH)	33	23	0.79%	0.52%
Native American or Alaska Native alone (NH)	24	33	0.57%	0.75%
Asian alone (NH)	96	103	2.29%	2.33%
Native Hawaiian or Pacific Islander alone (NH)	20	12	0.48%	0.27%
Other race alone (NH)	7	32	0.17%	0.72%
Mixed race or Multiracial (NH)	150	374	3.58%	8.46%
Hispanic or Latino (any race)	154	249	3.68%	5.63%
Total	4,186	4,421	100.00%	100.00%
