= Mima, Washington =

- Unincorporated community
- Interactive location map of Mima
- Coordinates: 46°51′55″N 123°04′00″W
- Country: United States
- State: Washington
- County: Thurston
- Time zone: UTC-8 (Pacific (PST))
  - Summer (DST): UTC-7 (PDT)

Mima is an unincorporated community in Thurston County, in the U.S. state of Washington. The area is located between Littlerock and Gate.

== History ==
A post office was in operation at Mima from 1893 until 1898. "Mima" is a name derived from a Native American language meaning "a little further along" or "downstream".

== Parks and recreation ==
The Mima Mounds Natural Area Preserve, declared a National Natural Landmark, is north of Mima. Other nearby protected areas include the Glacial Heritage Preserve and the Black River Habitat Management Area. The community lies near the border of Capitol State Forest.

The Gate to Belmore Trail, a rail trail, courses through the community.
