= Black River National Wildlife Refuge =

Wildlife preserve in Washington state

- Black River Preserve, Black River Unit
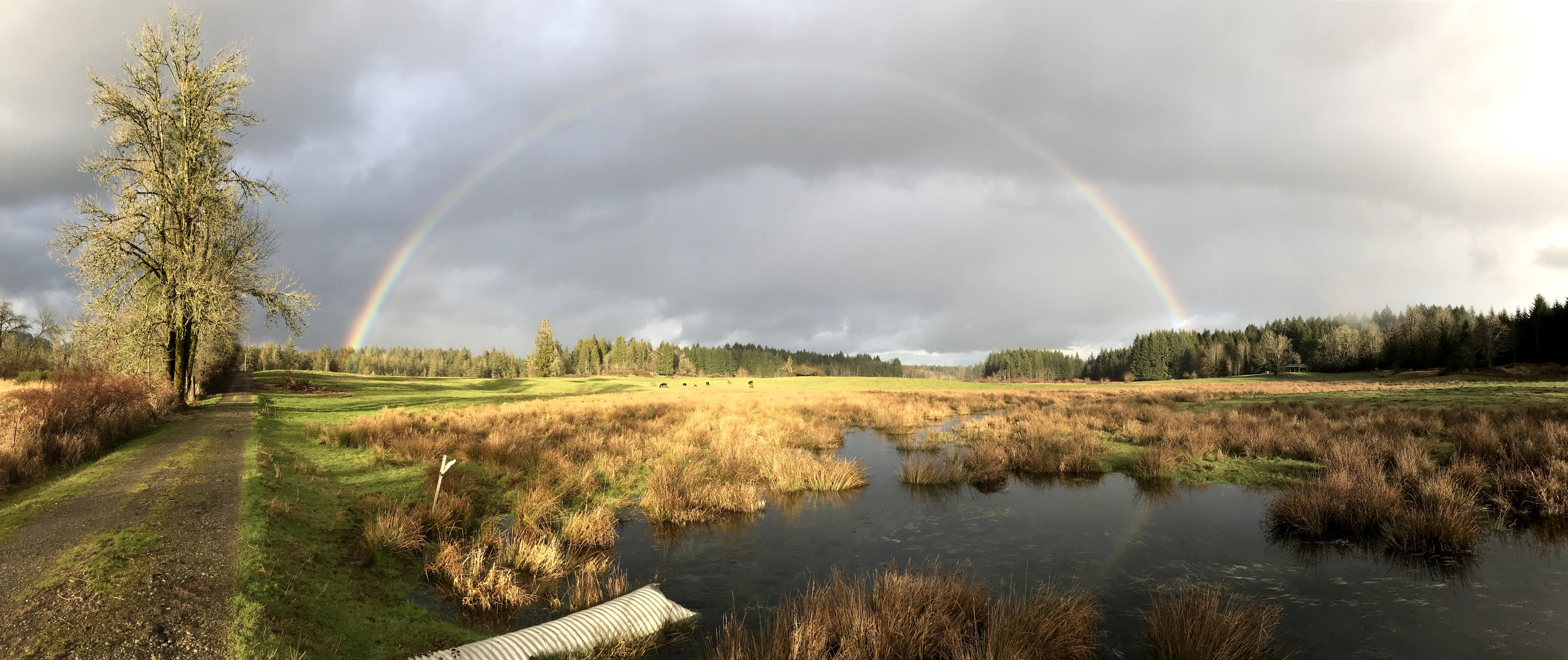
- Black River Unit, 2023
- Interactive map of Black River National Wildlife Refuge
- Location: Thurston County, Washington
- Nearest town: Littlerock, Washington
- Coordinates: 46°56′29.5″N 123°0′2.3″W
- Area: 2,200 acres (8.9 km^{2})
- Designation: National Wildlife Refuge
- Established: 1996
- Named for: Black River
- Administrator: Multiple agencies, conservation groups

The Black River National Wildlife Refuge is an in-development wildlife refuge located between Black Lake and the community of Littlerock in Thurston County, Washington. Also known under several different names including the Black River Preserve or Black River Unit, the site is officially part of the Billy Frank Jr. Nisqually National Wildlife Refuge.

The refuge was established in 1996 after ongoing efforts by local residents and organizations, such as The Nature Conservancy, were undertaken to preserve the rare and undisturbed wetland area. Privately-owned parcels have either been purchased through various groups and government agencies, or have been donated by landowners, to expand the preserve. As of 2026, the official size of the refuge is approximately 2,200 acres (890 ha) with a planned border encompassing 3,600 acres (1,500 ha).

Attempts to build asphalt and cement plants, as well as the expansion of a gravel mine, on the border of the preserve during the 2000s were thwarted after years of legal filings. The Black River Unit is home to several waterways and a variety of environments, and includes a diverse habitat of amphibians, birds, native fish, and mammals.

== History ==
=== Beginnings and land acquisition ===
The United States Fish and Wildlife Service (USFWS) listed the wetlands of the Black River as an "important habitat" in Washington state. The USWFS created the Black River Swamp Preserve Design in 1992, the first known instance of efforts to preserve the wetland region located south of Black Lake. As part of Thurston County, Washington's Shoreline Management Plan, the lands were designated as "natural". The Nature Conservancy purchased 320 acres (130 ha) in 1993 which was set aside for use as a preserve. Along with local and organizational advocation, a USFWS proposal to create a refuge was produced the same year.

Mostly private land, the refuge was officially created in 1996 and had expanded between 3,600 acres (1,500 ha) and 3,800 acres (1,500 ha) by 2004. (Note: The initial acreage for the refuge was planned to be 3,600 acres (1,500 ha). The actual size of the preserve, or its planned acreage, varies depending on reports. See sources throughout the article for the discrepancies.) The first official land purchase occurred in 1998 with financing provided by the Land and Water Conservation Fund and the Migratory Bird Conservation Fund. Additional parcels were purchased by the USFWS beginning in late-2000 due in part to a $3 million federal stipend intended for such purpose. A $1.35 million acquisition, located near the southern end of the preserve, was completed by the Nature Conservancy in January 2001. A portion of the 185-acre (75 ha) site was once part of the Weiks Dairy Farm. (Note: The Nature Conservancy received a "national land protection award" in 2004 from the United States Fish and Wildlife Service in recognition of the group's efforts to create the refuge.)

The preserve is made up of individual parcels, most of which were privately owned. By 2007, 41 parcels had been purchased or gifted through conservation easements. The lands combined to form an accompanying 5,500 acres (2,200 ha) that were prohibited from future development. Approximately 1,300 acres (530 ha) had been purchased by the United States government during the efforts.

=== Natural gas pipeline and mine expansion ===
In March 2002, the Federal Energy Regulatory Commission approved the construction of a $75 million, equivalent to $134,250,694 in 2025, natural gas pipeline through the Black River National Wildlife Refuge. The pipeline, running west of Black Lake from Rainier to natural gas-fired plants in Satsop, was to constructed under Dempsey and McLane creeks and Black River; a portion of the line is parallel to an existing right of way for a 1957 pipeline in the area. Residents' protests to move the line east of Black Lake were rejected as more homes would have been affected. Additional concerns were noted over a potential explosion causing regional power outages due to a major transmission line of the Bonneville Power Administration in the eastern section.

The expansion of a gravel mine and the construction of separate cement and hot asphalt plants near the refuge was approved by the Thurston County hearing examiner in April 2002. The refuge bordered the mine on three sides. Immediately undertaken that same month, local residents began protests and numerous environmental organizations filed appeals to oppose the authorizations; the legal appeals stated that in addition to the potential harm to the ecosystem and salmon habitat loss, water runoff and air pollution concerns were not properly addressed. Several state and federal agencies wrote in support of the withdrawal of the permits. (Note: Thurston County counterargued that the cement plant had previously been approved for construction under a different permit, and was therefore not subject to legal opposition. The mine and plant company, Quality Rock Products, stated that conclusions by the county to allow construction of the facilities were not based on "bad science".)

Neighborhoods in the area began organizing against the mine and plant constructions before a June appeals hearing; the asphalt plant and mine were temporarily halted after the hearing sent the issue back to the examiner for "further study". The examiner's approved proposal of the facilities was noted to be lacking in notations for possible affects of pollution to the refuge's ecosystem and waterways, as well as studies for soil concerns. Also included were additional concerns over increased traffic and pedestrian safety within the infrastructure of the area.

At the end of June 2002, an environmental movement group announced a "tree sit-in" in protest of the pipeline. The first protester was a 22-year old woman who went by the name, "Moss". Occupying a tree the day after the announcement, "Moss" sat in a Douglas fir, 80 feet (24.4 m) off the ground, located at the main crossing of the gas line near a wetlands area at the conjunction of Black River and Dempsey Creek. (Note: The tree sit-in took place in an area deemed by the pipeline contractor to be outside of the right of way for the gas line. Construction continued as the protester was noted to not be a hindrance. It was also unknown if "Moss" or the group she represented, Cascadia Defense Network, was trespassing.) In July, forty people, some from Earth First!, protested at a drilling site of the pipeline; a total of nine were arrested, including three who had chained themselves to drilling equipment.

As the gas pipeline build continued, homeowners voiced opposition to the county and state giving the company, Williams Companies, legal rights to condemn property in order to construct the line. (Note: In response to Williams Companies legal rights to build on homeowner lands, a resident referred to the actions as "legal thievery".) To offset environmental impacts during the project, the company was required by contract to purchase portions of the habitat, and commit to several studies. Agreeing to spend as much as $1.34 million, Williams Co. donated several land purchases, including a rock quarry, as well as funds for studies of the Oregon spotted frog and wetlands in the preserve.

In June 2003, the mine and asphalt plant's permits was reapproved by the hearing examiner based on hydrology studies by the mine operator, a purchased road easement, and almost two dozen restrictions to the mine in the updated authorization.

Ongoing issues and legal filings over permits and ecological impacts continued in the 2000s. The mine expansion and construction of the asphalt and cement plants were denied again in December 2003 by the Mason County court system but reapproved in October 2005, and then disallowed by the Washington Court of Appeals in February 2007. Further efforts for the mine and plant projects were permanently banned after the Washington Supreme Court refused to hear a final appeal by Quality Rock Products.

=== Ongoing development ===
As of 2026, efforts to develop and protect the area are ongoing. Management of the refuge is cooperatively undertaken by local, state, and federal departments, along with Capitol Land Trust, the Chehalis Basin Land Trust, and The Nature Conservancy. As the preserve is in a fragmented state, the Black River Unit is mostly closed to visitors.

== Geography ==
The refuge, also known as the Black River Preserve or Black River Unit, is officially part of Billy Frank Jr. Nisqually National Wildlife Refuge.

The unit, considered one of the last "undisturbed freshwater wetlands remaining in the Puget Sound area", sits roughly north of Glacial Heritage Preserve and Littlerock, Washington. The site's northern reach begins at the southern shore of Black Lake. The Black River and several streams meander through the protected site. The flat, low-lying nature of the river basin allows for surface flooding during the winter and spring seasons.

As of 2026, the official size of the refuge, as reported by the United States Fish and Wildlife Service, is approximately 2,200 acres (890 ha). (Note: Sourcing reports a wide range of acreage for the refuge but most of the land is either not developed, or not yet officially included as part of the Black River Unit. See sources throughout the article.) The long-term plan for the refuge is to connect the Black River watershed to Capitol Forest, creating a continuous wildlife corridor. Darlin Creek Preserve, purchased in 2016 by Capitol Land Trust, is part of the connection project.

== Environment ==
The refuge contains various types of environments, including forests, prairies, riparian zones, springs, and wetlands, which include bogs and marshes that are rare in the region. The unit also contains shoreline habitats along Black River, Mima Creek, and other streams.

== Ecology and wildlife ==
Animals located in the preserve include Roosevelt elk and deer. Elk in the unit can often suffer from elk hoof disease. Other creatures, such as American black bear, mink, and North American river otter, are located in prairie and wetland areas of the refuge.

Amphibians in the refuge include the endangered Oregon spotted frog. The species was thought extinct as no frog had been recorded in the state since 1968. The spotted frog, also known as Rana pretiosa, was rediscovered in 1990 in the area that later became the Black River Unit. (Note: In wetland areas used by the Oregon spotted frog to lay their eggs, cattle on nearby farms are allowed to "flash graze". The efforts help to keep grasses short for more open space and warmer waters which are beneficial to the frog's egg masses.)

The preserve is a breeding and migratory habitat for over 150 species of songbird and waterfowl. Ducks and types of goose include Pacific populations of American wigeon, Canada goose, gadwall, greater white-fronted goose, mallards northern shoveler, northern pintail, and American green-winged teal. Predatory birds include bald eagles and peregrine falcons. Other species, such as Caspian tern, double-crested cormorant, Virginia rail, and rufous hummingbird, are seen in the preserve.

The waters of the unit are a native trout and salmonid habitat, including Chinook, coho, cutthroat, and steelhead. The unit's waterways contain the protected Olympic mudminnow.

=== Invasive species ===
Lands in the preserve have undergone several efforts to eradicate invasive vegetation, such as purple loosestrife, wild chervil, and yellow flag iris. The most concerning invasive plant is reed canary grass which inhibits shoreline ecosystems. Non-native creatures include the American bullfrog. (Note: The invasive American bullfrog, which eats the Oregon spotted frog and its eggs, are hunted at night by "seasonal bullfrog technicians" and through the use of computer programs that track bullfrog calls.) Projects for habitat restoration and improved water quality have been ongoing.

== Recreation ==
The Gate to Belmore Trail, a rail trail, courses by the Black River National Wildlife Refuge.
