= Belmore, Washington =

- Unincorporated community
- Location within Washington (state) Location within the United States
- Coordinates: 46°59′14″N 122°57′45″W
- Country: United States
- State: Washington
- County: Thurston
- Time zone: UTC-8 (Pacific (PST))
  - Summer (DST): UTC-7 (PDT)

Belmore is an unincorporated community in Thurston County, in the U.S. state of Washington. The community lies east of nearby Black Lake and is approximately southwest of Tumwater.

== History ==
Belmore had a post office from 1895 until 1897.

== Parks and recreation ==
Belmore is home to Kenneydell Park located on Black Lake. The 41-acre (17 ha) park features a swimming area with a dock, picnic areas, and a 1,000 foot (300 m) gravel beach. The Gate to Belmore Trail, a rail trail, spans from the community through the Gate and Littlerock region.
