= Maytown, Washington =

- Unincorporated community
- Location within Washington (state) Location within the United States
- Coordinates: 46°53′51″N 122°56′36″W
- Country: United States
- State: Washington
- County: Thurston
- Time zone: UTC-8 (Pacific (PST))
  - Summer (DST): UTC-7 (PDT)

Maytown is an unincorporated community in Thurston County, in the U.S. state of Washington. The community is situated off I-5 and is east of Littlerock.

== Etymology ==
Folklore about the naming of the community mentions that a first settler named the town when he said, "It may become a town, and it may not, so I'll call it Maytown".

== History ==
Maytown was founded as a lumber town in 1911, and named after Maytown, Kentucky, the native home of the proprietor of a local sawmill. A post office was in operation at Maytown from 1922 until 1928.

== Arts and culture ==
Maytown hosts an annual winter holiday event referred to as Christmas Island, a nativity display with an opening festival of fireworks, caroling, and food. Begun in Thurston County from a family tradition in 1941, it has been held continuously since its inception. The presentation has moved locations several times, including a stretch from the 1950s into the early 1970s at Olympia's Capitol Lake. Christmas Island shifted, in 2012, to Maytown's Assembly of God Church.

== Parks and recreation ==
The community is close to Millersylvania State Park. Other nearby recreational spots include Offutt Lake and the Scatter Creek Unit and Scatter Creek Wildlife Recreation Area.

The South Sound Speedway, a Figure 8 racetrack, is south of the area.
