= Gate to Belmore Trail =

Rail trail in Washington state

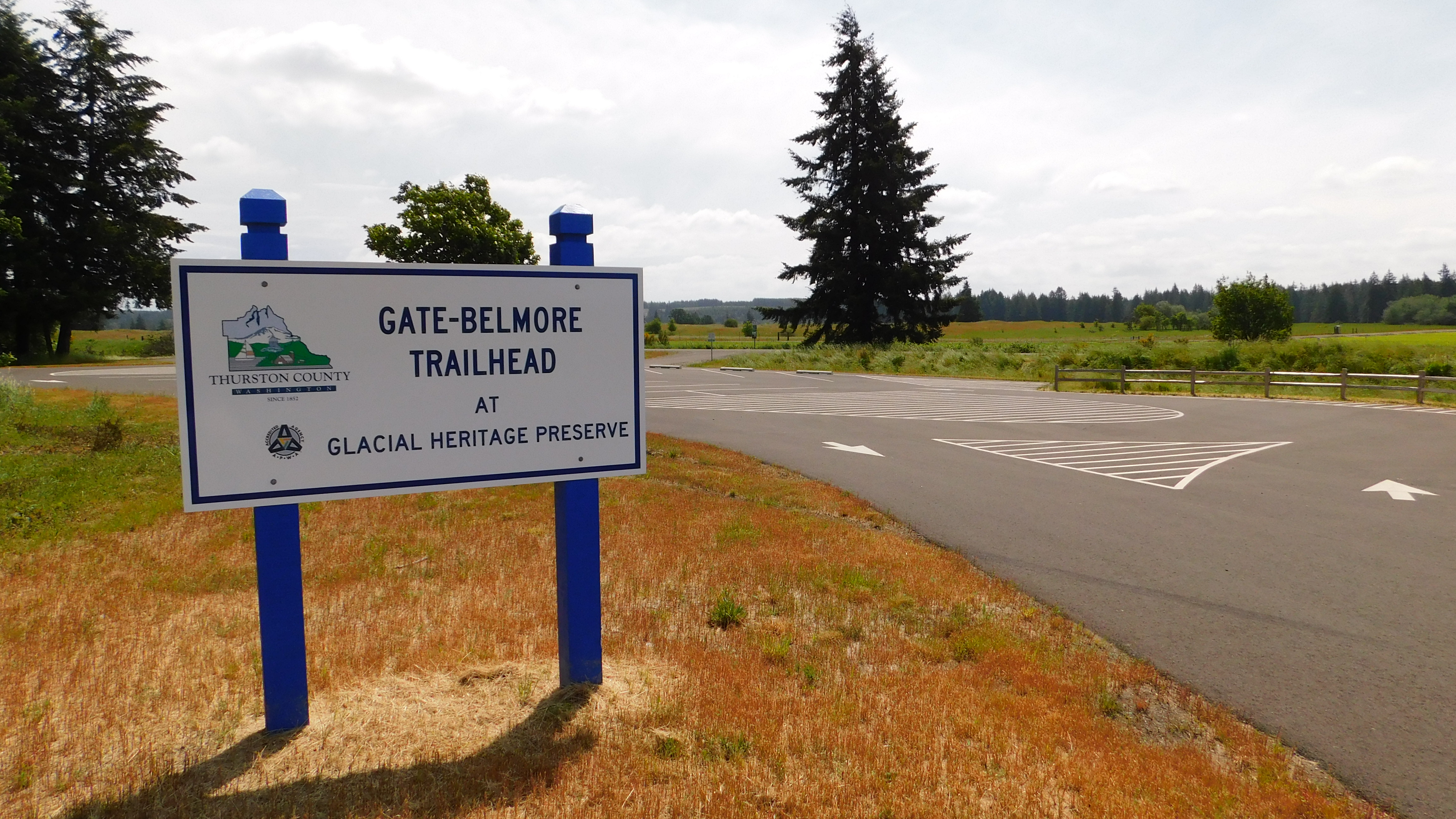
- Trailhead, Glacial Heritage Preserve, 2026
- Length: 14.5 miles (23.3 km), planned
- Location: Thurston County
- Began construction: 1996
- Completed: 2025 (partial)
- Use: Hiking, biking
- Grade: Flat
- Difficulty: Easy
- Surface: Gravel base
- Maintainer: Thurston County Public Works Department

The Gate to Belmore Trail, also known as the Gate–Belmore Trail, is a rail trail in Thurston County, Washington connecting the communities of Gate, Littlerock, and Belmore near Black Lake. The planned 14.5-mile (23.3 km) trail remained closed since its acquisition in 1996 but a portion of the pathway was formally opened in July 2025.

== History ==
The trail is a former railroad line of BNSF constructed in the 1890s and located in southwestern Thurston County. The county obtained a 12.5-mile (20.1 km) section of the railway in 1996 with the intent to convert it into a walking trail. The path is to be part of a connected system within the county, including access to the Chehalis Western Trail and the Yelm–Rainier–Tenino Trail.

The Gate to Belmore Trail remained undeveloped into the 21st century, with limited public access. Before it was officially opened, and due to its inchoate nature and concerns of liability, the route was closed though the path was used by people in the surrounding community without impediment by the county.

A 2.7 miles (4.3 km) portion of the trail near the Glacial Heritage Wildlife Area Unit was officially opened on July 25, 2025. The paved extension and trailhead was part of a $2 million initiative through the county's Trail Connectivity Program.

== Route ==
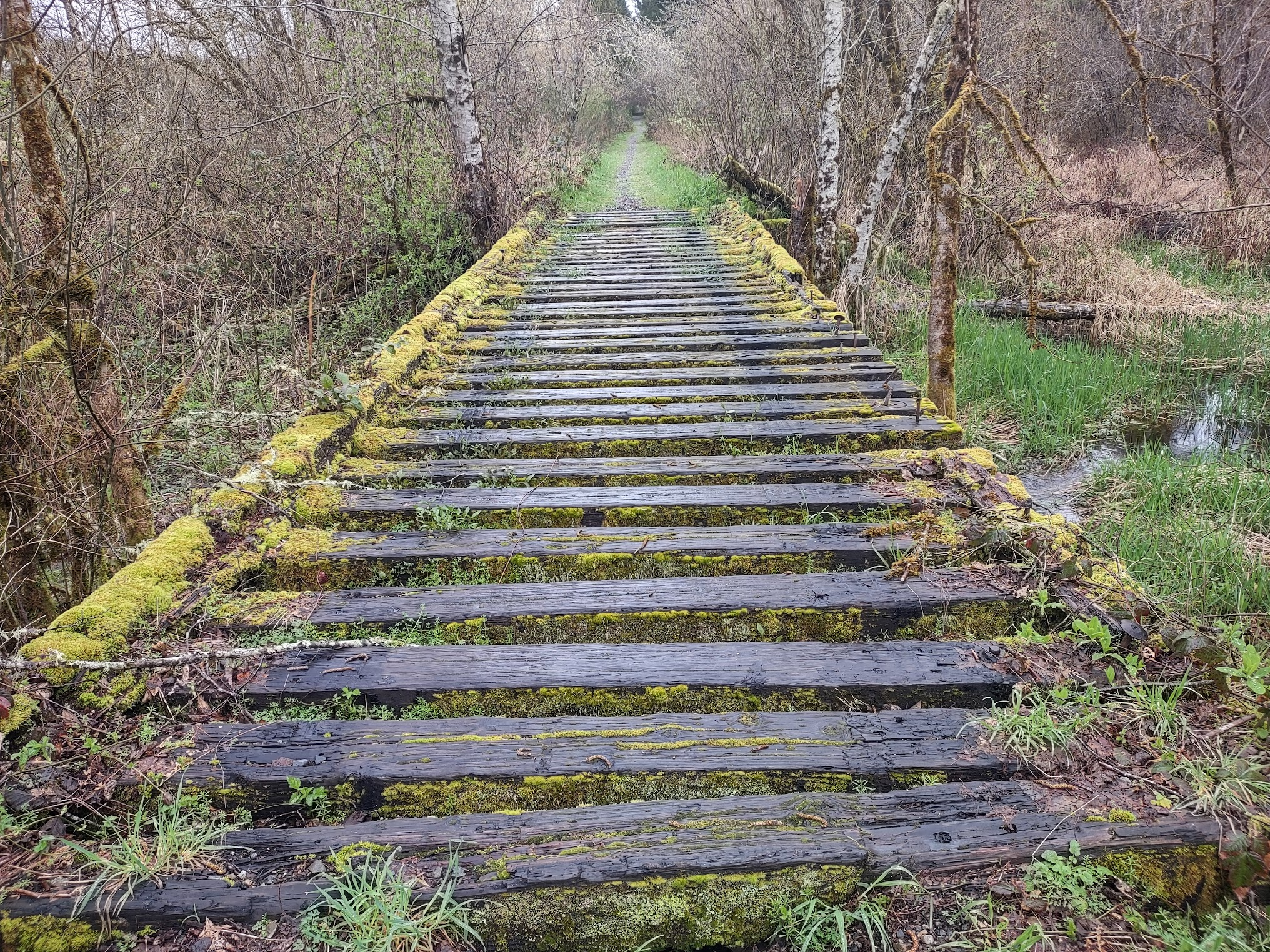
One of the many wooden trestles that have not been converted to pedestrian bridges.

Starting at the northern trailhead, the trail begins in Kenneydell Park at Black Lake in the community of Belmore, located south of Tumwater. The course meanders south and passes through or near several local parks and preserves including the Mima Mounds Natural Area Preserve, Glacial Heritage Preserve, the Black River Habitat Management Area and Capitol State Forest. The trail journeys through Littlerock and then heads southwest, ending in Gate.

The trail has remained true to the original path and grade of the railroad line. The effort was planned so as to minimize any environmental disturbances, to preserve "the natural character" of the area, and to be respectful of the cultures and history of indigenous people who once lived and traveled through south Thurston County. The route also crosses over the Black River where a derelict railway bridge crosses over it; several other railroad bridges are also in need of repair or rebuild.

== Ecology and environment ==
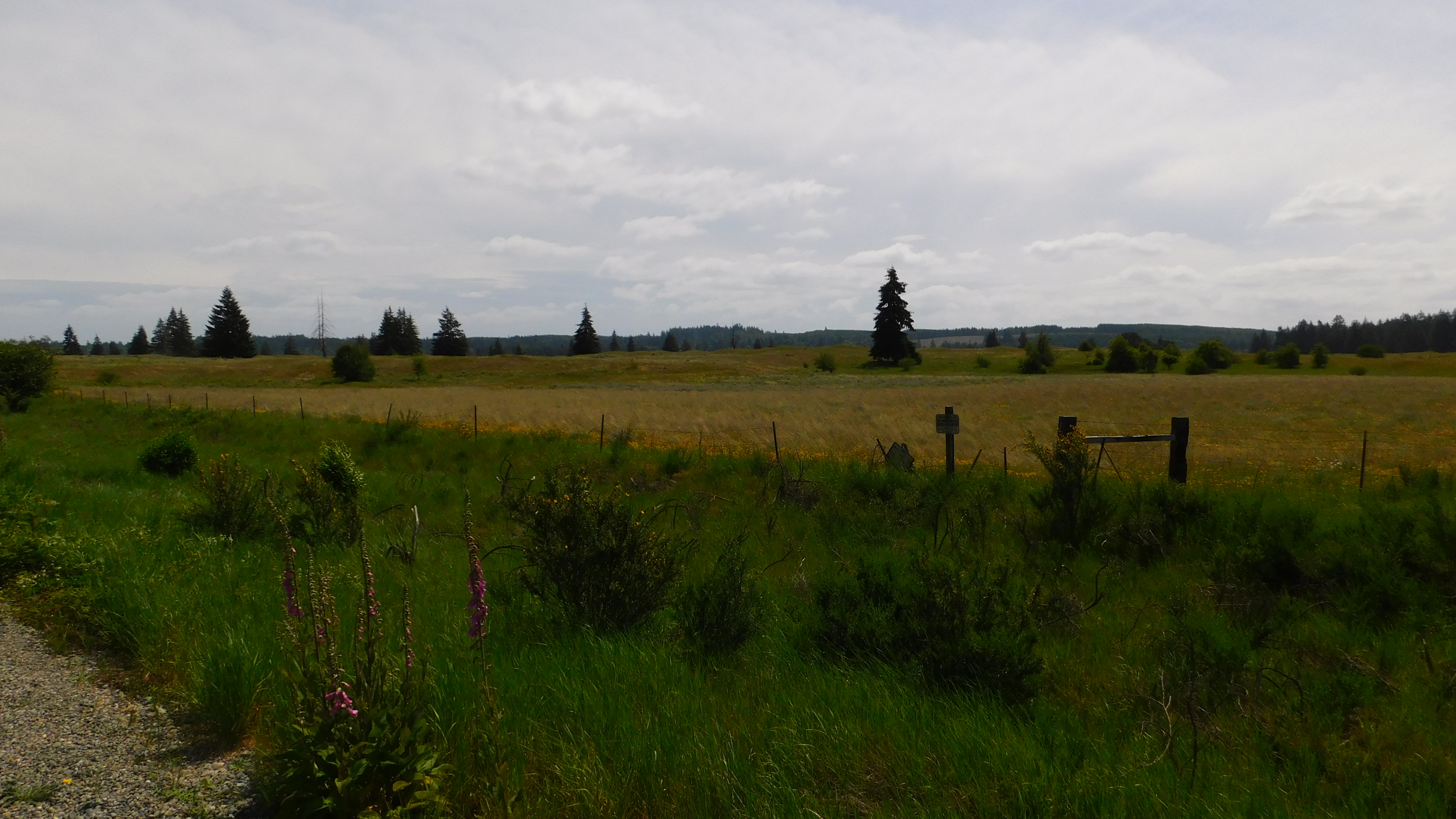
Glacial Heritage Preserve, 2026

The path crosses through several terrains and environment including prairie, forested areas, and wetlands. Before the rail line was converted to a trail, invasive vegetation overran the tracks. Since renovations began, the path has seen a return of alligator lizards as well as native birds such as bluebirds, California quail, osprey, and turkey vultures. Construction of the trail was coordinated to lessen any impacts on the natural ecology necessary for the survival of the endangered Taylor's checkerspot butterfly.

== Future plans ==
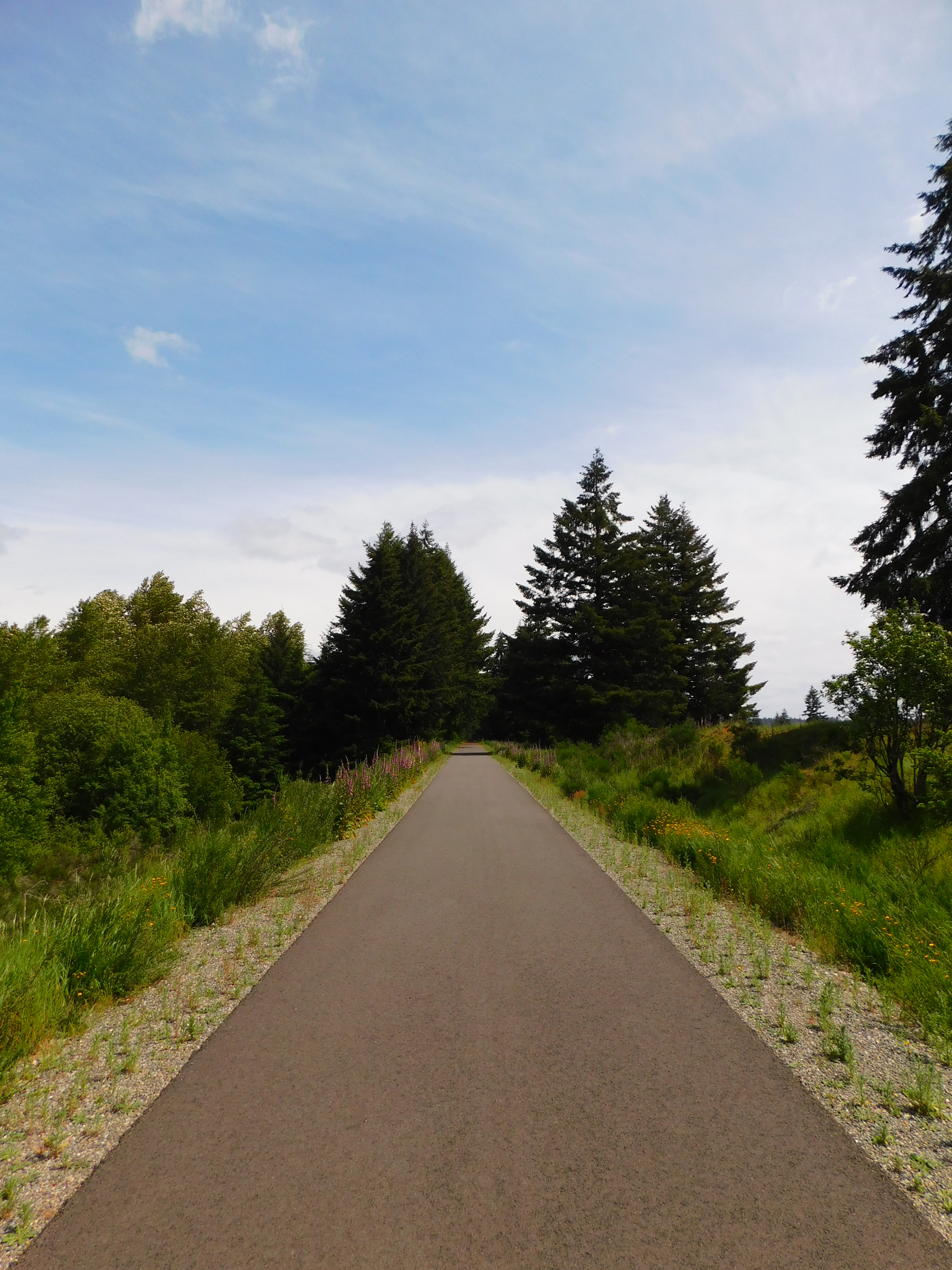
Paved section, near Glacial Heritage Preserve, 2026

Several stages have been scheduled to officially open the entirety of the trail. Plans have included 4.0 miles (6.4 km) of improvement to the Littlerock to Gate section, consisting of an updated trailhead and picnic area. A similar stretch of 0.25 miles (0.40 km) is outlined for the northern terminus in Belmore. The trail program is also seeking further funding for a 0.5-mile (0.80 km) addition to the existing course. Access to the trail for residents of Chehalis Village, part of the Confederated Tribes of the Chehalis Reservation, is planned via a broader scope of connecting the entire trail system in the county.

After the 2025 opening, the county announced plans to increase the length of the Gate to Belmore Trail to 14.5 miles (23.3 km).

== See also ==
- Black River National Wildlife Refuge
