= Black River (Chehalis River tributary) =

River in Thurston County, Washington state

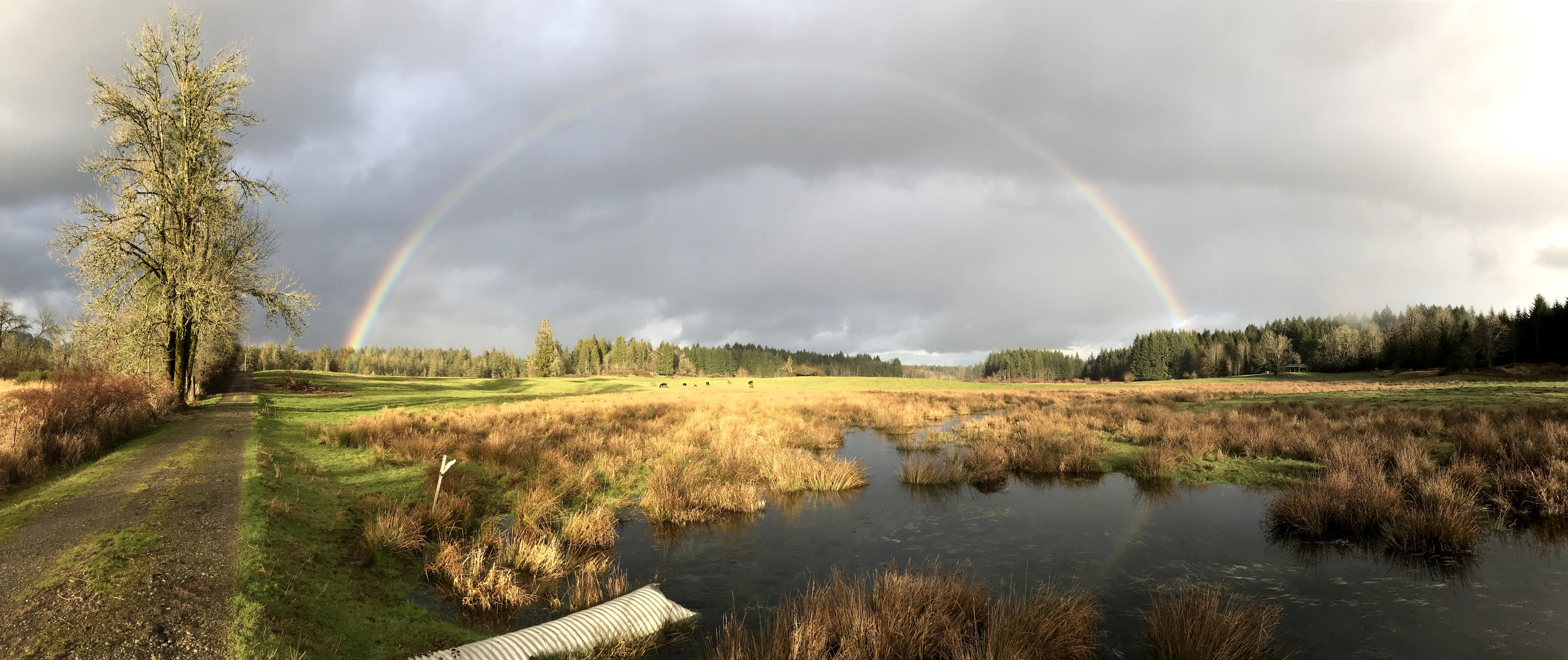
- Wetland near Black River, 2023
- Interactive map of River location
- Etymology: Color of waters

Location
- Country: United States
- State: Washington
- County: Thurston County

Physical characteristics
- Mouth
  - coordinates: 46°49′16″N 123°13′10″W
- Length: 25 mi (40 km)
- Basin size: 144 mi^{2} (370 km^{2})

Basin features
- Progression: Black River→ Chehalis River→ Pacific Ocean
- GNIS feature ID: 1511608

The Black River is a river in Thurston County in the U.S. state of Washington. It is approximately 25 miles (40 km) long with a drainage basin of about 144 square miles (370 km^{2}).

== History ==
In November of 1824, an expedition commanded by James McMillan set out to travel through the Black River and Black Lake. One of the explorers, fur trader John Work, described the Black River as "so named from the colour of its water ... A great many dead salmon are in the river, and many that are just alive and barely able to move through the water."

In 1922, a ditch was created to connect the river to Percival Creek, making Black River the only waterway to drain to the Puget Sound (via Budd Inlet) and the Pacific Coast.

The river was recognized in 1980 by the United States Fish and Wildlife Service (USFWS) as an important fish and wildlife habitat, one of twenty in Washington state. The Nature Conservancy began efforts afterwards to create a wildlife refuge around the northern reaches of Black River. Approved by the federal government in 1996, the site became known as the Black River National Wildlife Refuge, considered a part of the Nisqually Wildlife Refuge. An additional unit overseen by the state is the Black River Wildlife Area Unit.

== Course ==
The Black River's source are natural springs and Black Lake, located about 3 miles (4.8 km) west of Tumwater. The river spans more than 20 miles (32 km) and has numerous meanders. The topography of the river is flat and is considered to be a slow-current waterway.

The river flows generally south, through Littlerock, near the Mima Mounds Natural Area Preserve, then southwest, passing through the Black River Habitat Management Area and the town of Rochester, before meandering west through the community of Gate and entering Grays Harbor County, where it empties into the Chehalis River in the Chehalis Indian Reservation.

== Environment and ecology ==
Peat bogs and various wetlands, which include permanent, seasonal, or forested areas, are located in the Black River Refuge.

The river, including the Black River Unit at Billy Frank Jr. Nisqually National Wildlife Refuge, includes various aquatic and bird species.

=== Birds ===
Bird species in the Black River Refuge, and along the course of the waterway, include various species of sparrows, swallows, vireo, warblers, and wrens, as well as numerous types of waterfowl.

- American bittern
- American green-winged teal
- American wigeon
- bald eagle
- Canada geese (Pacific population)
- Caspian tern
- cedar waxwing
- double-crested cormorant
- gadwall
- Great blue heron
- greater white-fronted goose (Pacific population)
- Green heron
- Hooded merganser
- Kingfisher
- mallard (Western population)
- northern pintail
- northern shoveler
- peregrine falcon
- Pine siskin
- Red-tail hawk
- rufous hummingbird
- Spotted towhee
- Virginia rail

=== Fish ===
- Chinook salmon
- coho salmon
- cutthroat trout
- Olympic mudminnow
- steelhead trout

=== Frogs ===
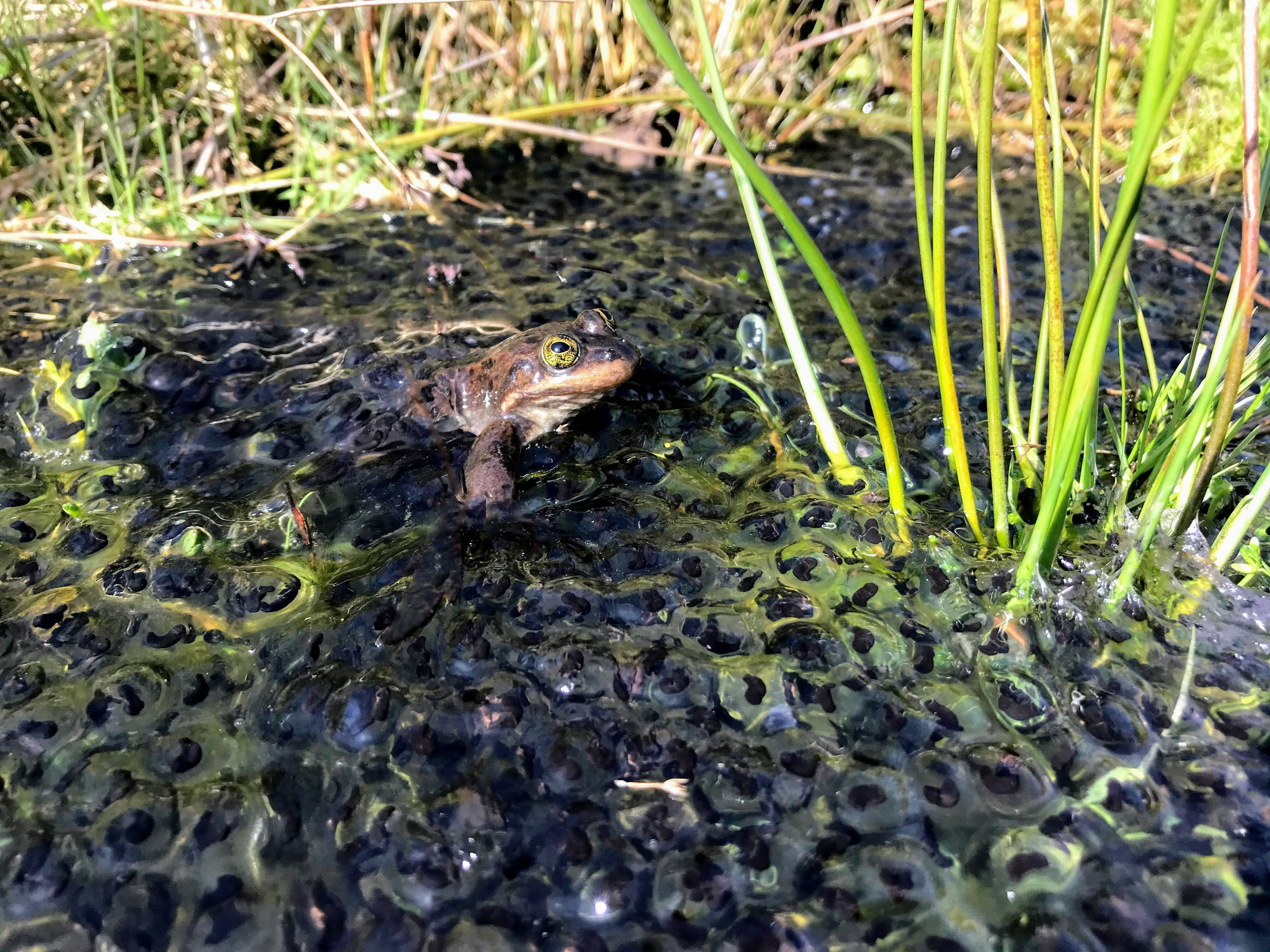
Oregon spotted frog found in Black River

- Oregon spotted frog

=== Vegetation ===
The shores and waters of the Black River are home to various species of plants, such as lilies, mint, and sedges. Trees along the waterway include alder and willow.

== Recreation ==
The Black River is open to fishing usually during the middle of the year; cutthroat trout is a common catch. Camping is not sanctioned in the Black River Refuge but self-propelled watercraft, such as kayaks or paddleboards, are approved.

== See also ==
- List of geographic features in Thurston County, Washington
- List of rivers in Washington
