= Gate, Washington =

Unincorporated community in Washington, United States

- Unincorporated community
- Interactive map of Gate, Washington
- Coordinates: 46°50′38″N 123°08′15″W
- Country: United States
- State: Washington
- County: Thurston
- Elevation: 121 ft (37 m)
- Time zone: UTC-8 (Pacific (PST))
  - Summer (DST): UTC-7 (PDT)
- Area code(s): 360, 564
- GNIS feature ID: 1505094

Gate is an unincorporated community in Thurston County, Washington, United States. Gate is located on the Black River, 2.9 miles (4.7 km) west-northwest of Rochester.

The community began as a logging town, existing from its peak years in the early 20th century up to the 1940s when timber operations had already begun to wane. Despite Gate hosting modern amenities of the time, such as an opera hall, no buildings from the town's past remain with the exception of the Gate School, which is listed on the National Register of Historic Places.

Gate is located immediately near several protected areas and preserves, and is the southern terminus of the Gate to Belmore Trail.

== History ==
The community was established in 1881 and platted in 1890. The Northern Pacific Railway built a junction in Gate. Although Northern Pacific attempted to refer to the community as Harlowe Junction, the town was named Gate City, shortened to Gate, due to the railroad junction which made it the "gateway to the coast". A common misperception is that Gate was meant to stand for the town's location at a main entrance to Capitol Forest.

The community's economy was based on logging and timber processing; its largest business was the Mason County Logging Company. The business was started by the Bordeaux brothers, founders of Bordeaux, Washington. Timber was harvested from the surrounding region, particularly in the Black Hills. During the town's peak in the early 1900s, the community hosted a train depot (Note: Gate may have had two train depots.) and passenger trains passed through Gate up to eight times per day. Gate also hosted a baseball field, an opera hall, various restaurants, and a dance hall that featured a roller skating rink.

Much of the town was devastated by fires in the early 1900s, and the decline of the area's lumber mills further hurt Gate's economy. Logging began to wane due to the closure of sawmills and the Mason County Logging Company in the late 1930s, coupled with forest fires and loss of old growth trees. A north-to-south rail line that was proposed to be built in the area brought economic hope to Gate but the tracks were constructed at Bucoda instead. Logging companies sold their landholdings and only farming remained as a viable economic source. The population dwindled slowly. With less use for passenger trains due to the increased availability of automobiles, along with the build of U.S. Route 12, homes and businesses became vacant and the community of Gate ceased.

With exception of the schoolhouse, no buildings from Gate's beginnings exist.

== Geography ==
Gate, located in southwest Thurston County, was at a junction of two rail lines. The town was split by the Black River. The river was home to migrating salmon, thick enough during peak runs that residents used spears to fish.

== Arts and culture ==
The Gate School, which is listed on the National Register of Historic Places, is located in Gate.

== Parks and recreation ==
The community is a trailhead for the Gate to Belmore Trail, a county-maintained rail trail.

The Mima Mounds Natural Area Preserve, declared a National Natural Landmark, is northeast of Gate. Other nearby protected areas include the Glacial Heritage Preserve and the Black River Habitat Management Area, which are part of the Scatter Creek Wildlife Area. The community lies near the border of Capitol State Forest.
