= Lake Lucinda =

Lake in Thurston County, Washington state

- Location within Washington (state)
- Location: Thurston County, Washington
- Coordinates: 46°57′34″N 123°02′27″W
- Type: Reservoir
- Etymology: Named after residential complex
- Part of: Darlin Creek Preserve
- River sources: Darlin Creek
- Settlements: Delphi, Washington
- References: Geographic Names Information System: 1532925

Lake Lucinda is a lake in the U.S. state of Washington. The lake is located within the Darlin Creek Preserve.

== History ==
The lake is impounded by the Lake Lucinda Dam. Lake Lucinda took its name from a nearby residential complex.

== Geography ==
Lake Lucinda is located near Capitol State Forest in the Black River watershed of Thurston County, Washington. The lake is located in Darlin Creek Preserve, which is adjacent to two other conservation sites, the Carlson Preserve and the Edwards Conservation Easement. Darlin Creek, along with Dempsey and Pants creeks, course through the area.

== Darlin Creek Preserve ==
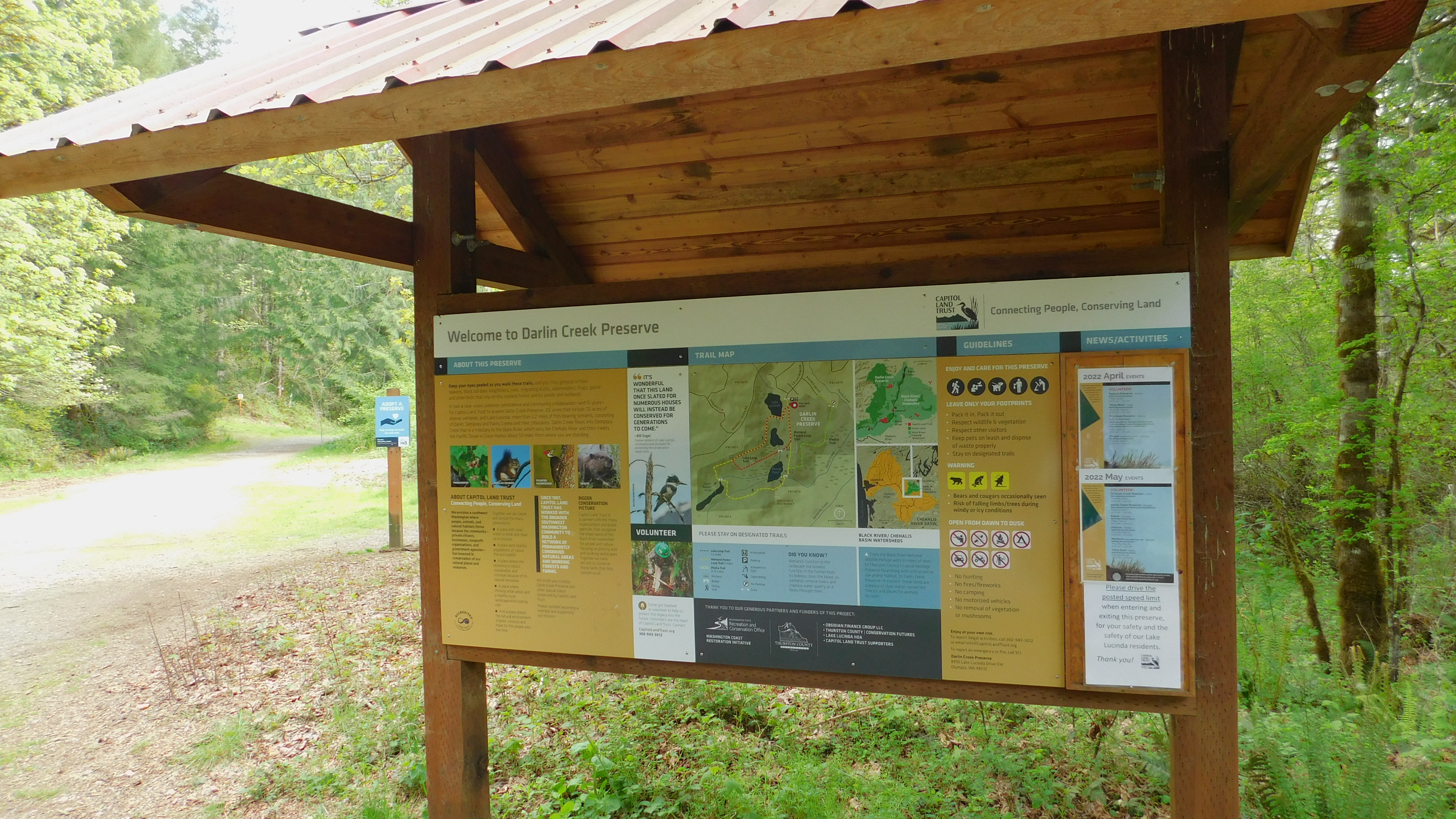
Darlin Creek Presesrve, interpretive sign, 2022

The land for Darlin Creek Preserve was purchased from a lumber company in 2016 by Capitol Land Trust, a non-profit conservation group. The preserve was officially opened in June 2018 after invasive species and two culverts were removed. The site encompasses 312 acres (126 ha) and in conjunction with the Carlson Preserve and the Edwards Conservation Easement, forms a continuous 387-acre (157 ha) conservation area. The preserve features recovering forest and 70 acres (28 ha) of wetlands. A long-term effort is to connect the preserve to Capitol Forest and the Black River Wildlife Area Unit.

There are three trails at Darlin Preserve, built with help from the Washington Trails Association. The Lake Loop Trail, 1.3 miles (2.1 km) in length, follows a discontinued logging road and railroad bed through the wetland area of the preserve. The longest trail, at 2 miles (3.2 km), is the Wetland Forest Loop Trail, that continues on the logging road to Beaver and South Beaver ponds. The preserve also contains the 1 mile (1.6 km) Piedra Trail.

The creeks and ponds are migration paths for various fish, including cutthroat trout, coho and Chinook salmon, and steelhead. The watershed is also home to the endangered Oregon spotted frog.

== See also ==
- List of geographic features in Thurston County, Washington
