= Scatter Creek Wildlife Area =

Wildlife preserve in Washington state

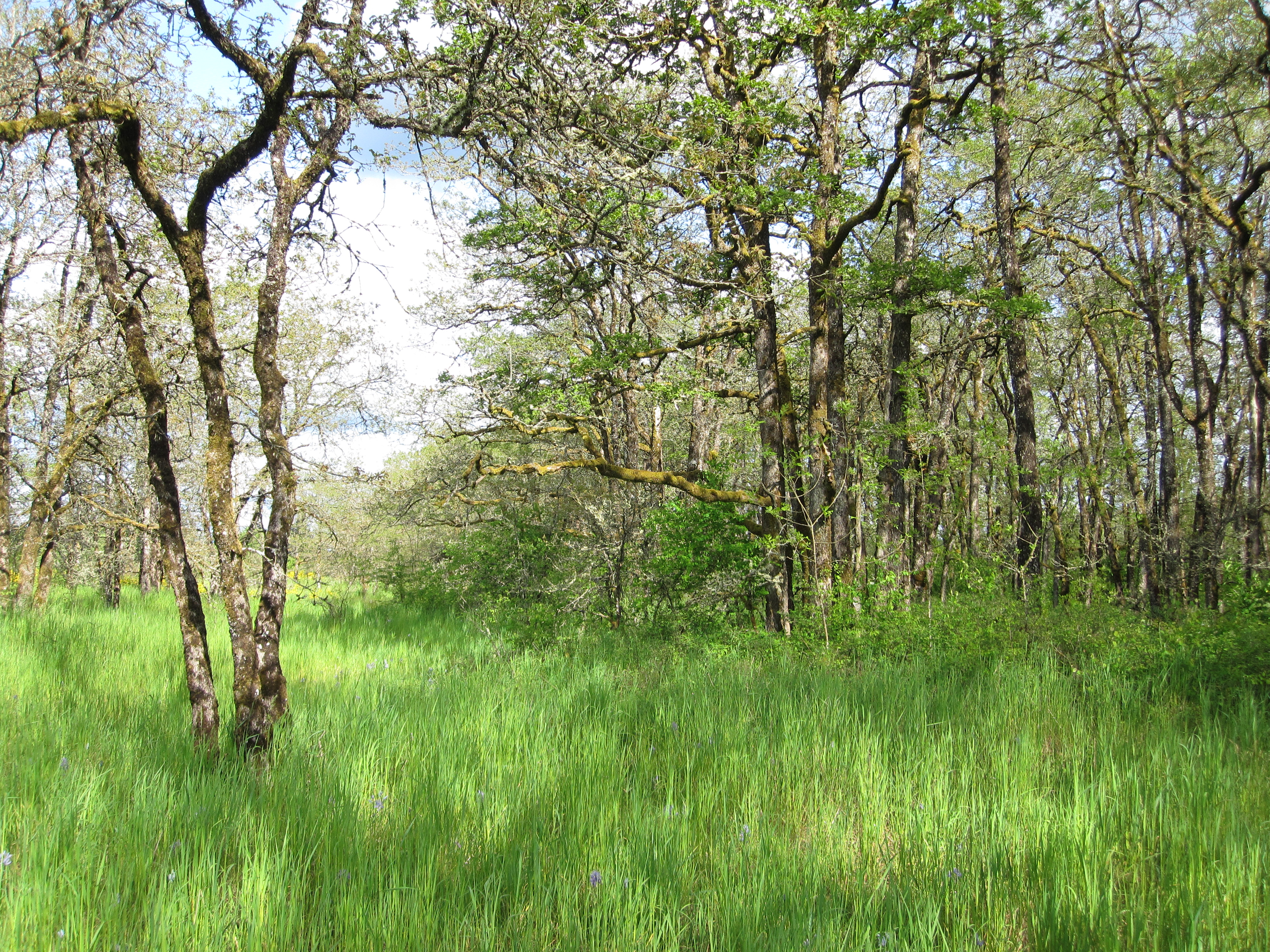
- Garry oaks (Quercus garryana) bordering Scatter Creek
- Interactive map of Scatter Creek Unit location
- Location: Southwest Washington, Washington, United States
- Coordinates: 46.833°N 123.007°W
- Governing body: Washington Department of Fish & Wildlife
- Website: Washington State Department of Fish & Wildlife - Scatter Creek Wildlife Area

The Scatter Creek Wildlife Area is a multi-unit protected area and wildlife preserve in southern Thurston County, Washington. Covering seven units, the area is owned and managed by the Washington Department of Fish and Wildlife (WDFW) in cooperation with county government and volunteer organizations.

== History ==
Grassland and prairie units of the Scatter Creek Wildlife area were formed by retreating glaciers approximately 15,000 years ago. (Note: Other sources mention the glacial retreats that affected the prairie lands to have occurred 10,000 years ago.) The glacial till helped create an outwash plain of thin soil that is full of rocks; the prairie is often prone to drought due to the shallow layers. A fertile ecosystem developed which allowed the migration of animal, insect, and plant species into the areas. Indigenous people in the region used the prairies for sustenance and medicinal needs, harvesting a variety of wildflowers or hunting wild game. Native Americans used fire to allow the prairies to remain as open grassland.

Early settlers converted the prairie lands into farms, introducing non-native plants and stopping the practice of controlled burns. The Scatter Creek area was temporarily used as the county seat for Thurston County.

The prairies of Scatter Creek and connected units was once part of Puget prairie which once spanned up to 160,000 acres (65,000 ha). Approximately 2% of the original prairie footprint remains with most restoration and conservation efforts undertaken by local volunteer groups in collaboration with environmental scientists. The first restoration and preservation projects undertaken in the Scatter Creek Wildlife Area began in the mid-1990s.

=== Oversight and management ===
The multiple units of Scatter Creek are overseen by a cooperative that includes The Nature Conservancy, Thurston County Parks Department, and Washington Department of Fish and Wildlife (WDFW), along with several volunteer associations.

== Units ==
=== Black River Wildlife Area Unit ===
The Black River Wildlife Area Unit is located between Gate and Rochester, Washington on the Black River. Open for the fishing, hunting, and viewing of wildlife, the 120-acre (49 ha) grounds features a sedge meadow. The unit is also known as the Black River Habitat Management Area. (Note: An additional preserve of a similar name, the Black River National Wildlife Refuge, also known as the Black River Unit, is part of Billy Frank Jr. Nisqually National Wildlife Refuge. The refuge is located north of Littlerock. The unit was established in 1996. As of 2026, efforts to develop and protect the 2,200-acre (890 ha) preserve are ongoing.)

The Nature Conservancy purchased a pair of wetland tracts totaling 124 acres (50 ha) near the refuge in 2002.

=== Davis Creek Wildlife Area Unit ===
The Davis Creek Wildlife Area Unit is located near Oakville and contains numerous animal and bird species, including deer, elk, and various types of waterfowl. The 654-acre (265 ha) riparian unit is situated near the Chehalis River and visitors are able to fish and hunt on the grounds.

=== Glacial Heritage Wildlife Area Unit ===
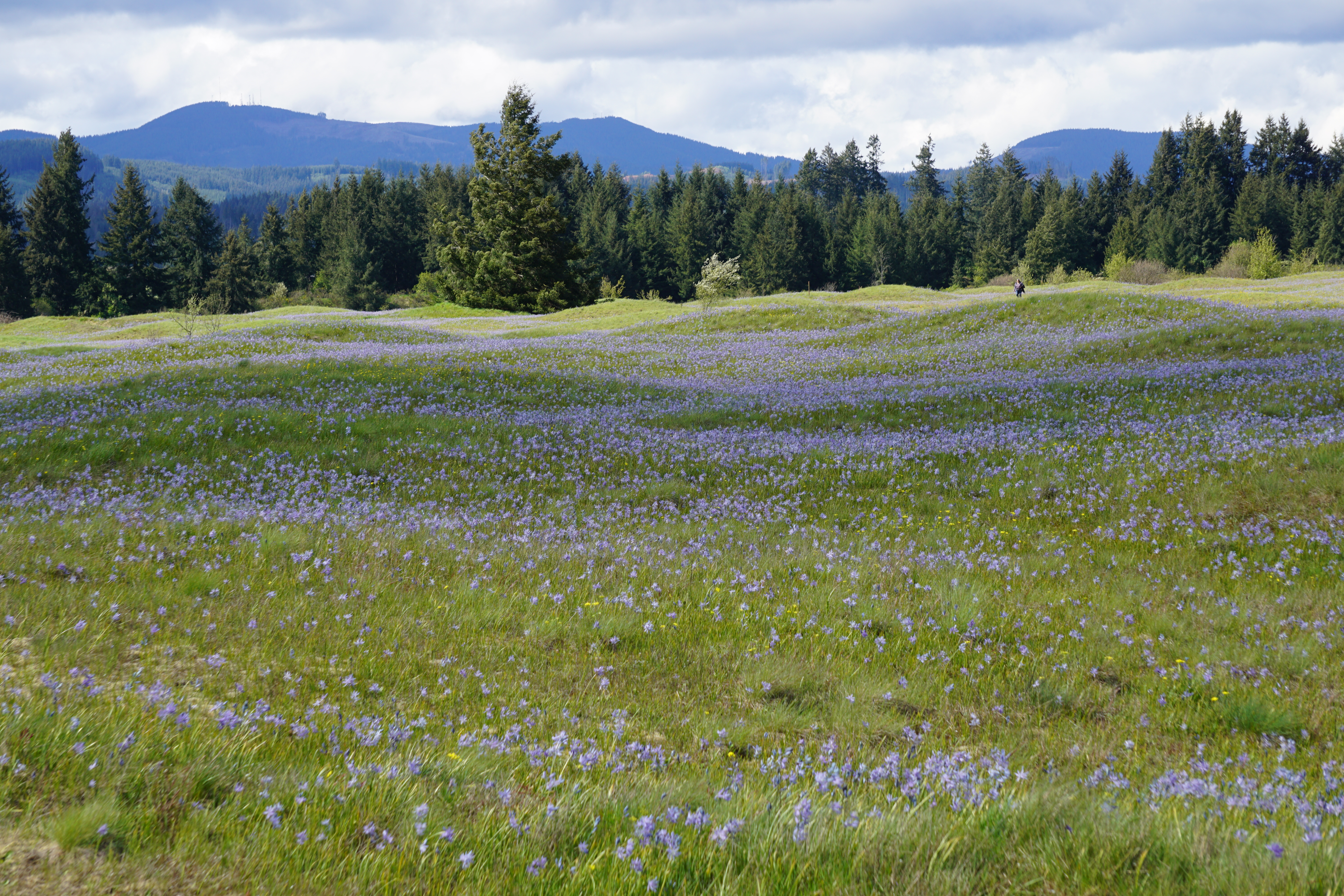
Prairie at Glacial Heritage Preserve, 2022

The Glacial Heritage Wildlife Area Unit, known as the Glacial Heritage Preserve or under its formal name, Black River-Mima Prairie Glacial Heritage Preserve, is located east of Mima, Washington between Littlerock and Rochester, directly south of the Mima Mounds Natural Area Preserve on the Black River. The 80-acre (32 ha) prairie grassland unit, (Note: The overall Glacial Heritage Preserve ecosystem is listed at 1,000 acres (400 ha).) part of a larger prairie oak ecosystem, protects rare and threatened plant species located within the preserve. The unit is open to the public only one day per year, known as Prairie Appreciation Day, an event held since 1994. (Note: The once-a-year Prairie Appreciation Day is usually held on the second Saturday of May.)

The lands were purchased in 2005. The preserve and unit are joint-owned by Thurston County and the Washington Department of Fish and Wildlife (WDFW). Oversight and management of the lands have been under the Center for Natural Lands Management (CNLM) since 2011 and a volunteer group, known as the Friends of Puget Prairies since 2004. The CNLM also operates a nursery near the preserve, storing native seeds to help replenish the overall protected wildlife corridor.

Along with the prairie and oak habitat, a coniferous forest and a woodland riparian area near the Black River are located within the boundaries of the grounds.

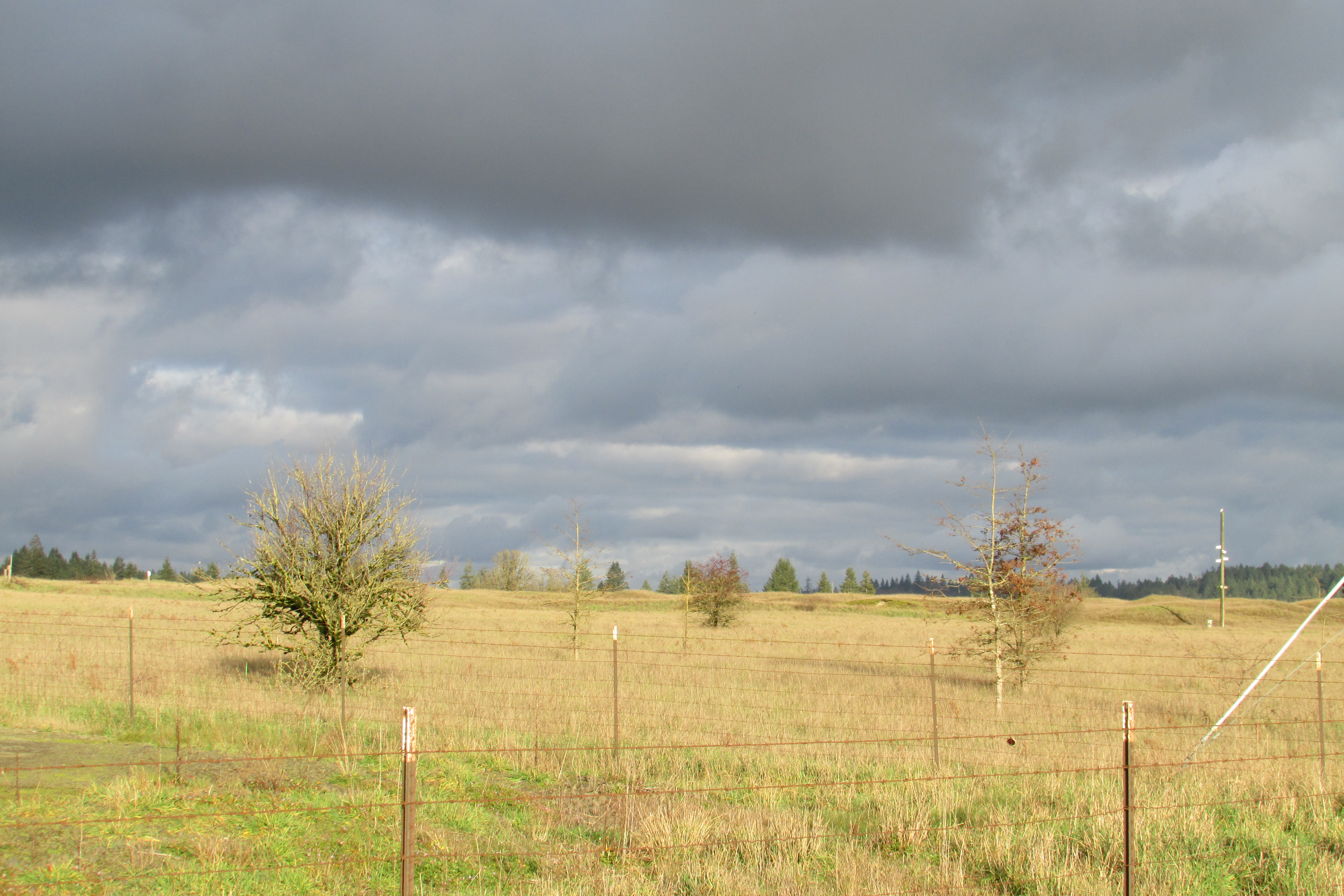
Glacial Heritage Natural Area Preserve, 2023

Several species of animals and birds, such as elk and western meadowlark, have returned to the Glacial Heritage Wildlife Area. The prairie is home to purple martins, robins, and towhees, as well as raptor species such as kestrels and ospreys. Native plants, which include camas and the endangered golden paintbrush, have thrived in the protected habitat. The golden paintbrush is a crucial food source for larvae of the Taylor's checkerspot butterfly, an endangered species. Conservation efforts include persistent attention to the removal of Scotch broom, an invasive, non-native plant.

The southern end of the Gate to Belmore Trail is near the preserve and under plans by the county's Trail Connectivity Program, the pathway is to be extended by 1.6 miles (2.6 km) to the site. The project would connect the corridor of natural areas and preserves to the Yelm-Rainier-Tenino Trail and other hiking routes in the region.

=== Scatter Creek Unit ===
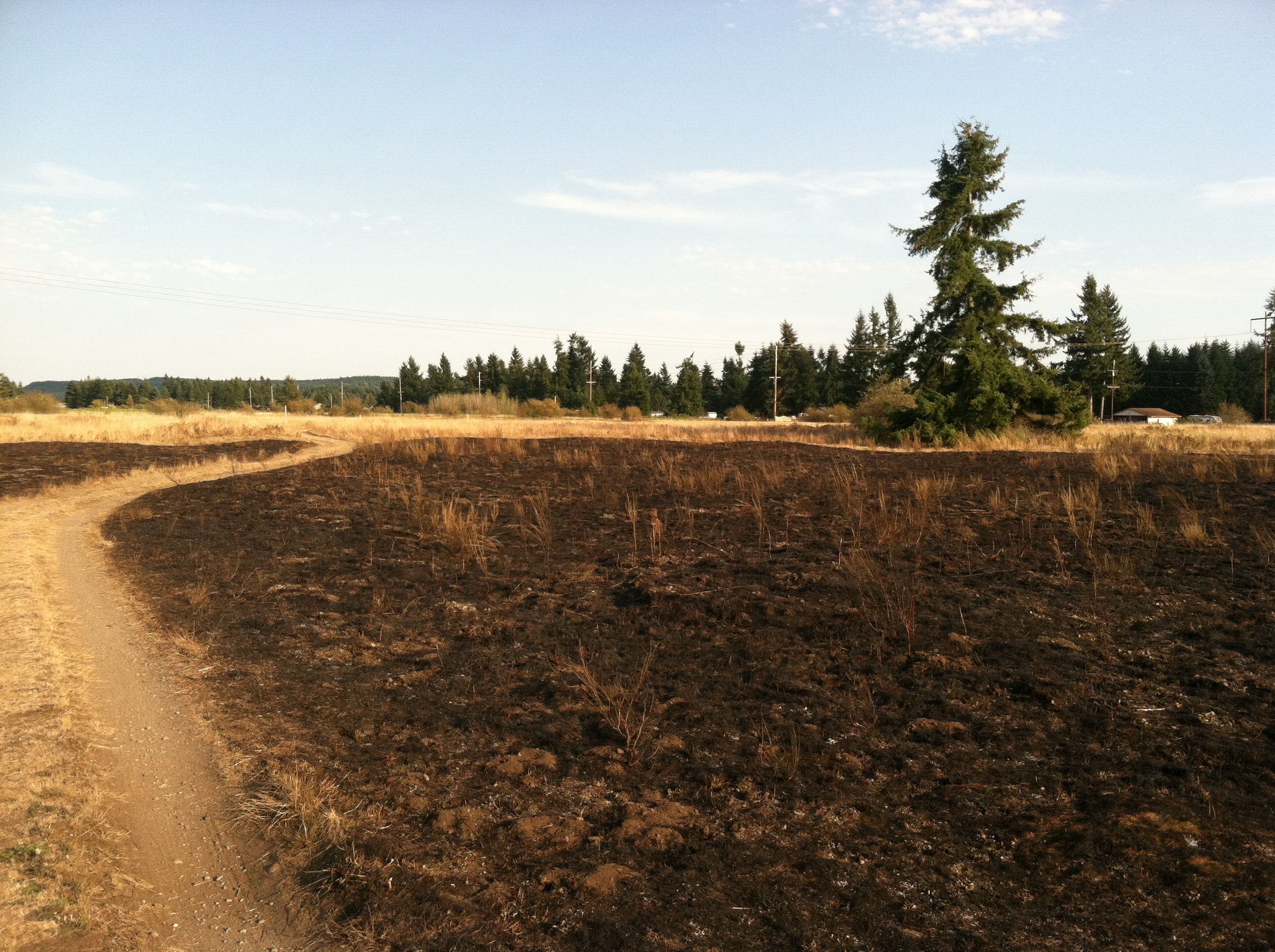
Controlled burn at Scatter Creek Unit, 2014

The Scatter Creek Unit is a 1,079-acre (437 ha) unit that is split into two sections, the North site and the South site and is located near Grand Mound, Washington and Rochester. The south unit is the site of the former Miller-Brewer homestead.

A brush fire in August 2017 burned approximately 345 acres (140 ha) in the South site of the Scatter Creek area. An historic home and barn were lost during the blaze, thought to be caused by human activity. Restoration of the prairie immediately after the fire was estimated to take years and potentially cost $1 million. The WDFW, which annually released pheasants equally to both the North and South parcels, divided their September 2017 release heavily in favor of the south portion to offset losses from the fire.

The Scatter Creek Unit is home to one of the few remaining sections of south Puget Sound prairie. Garry oaks can be found growing in riparian areas, along with Oregon ash. In the forested hills on the north side of the reserve, conifers such as Douglas fir predominate. Mima mounds can be found at both the North and South site. Native wildflowers are abundant in the units, with species such as balsamroot, camas, and chocolate lily.

The stream, Scatter Creek, meanders through the unit. The creek is a tributary of the Chehalis River and is home to a population of native coho salmon. A fish hatchery outside the unit, in the early 2000s, was the only such facility to raise Atlantic salmon in the state. In 2003, the non-native species was spotted in Scatter Creek.

The unit has been used by visitors as a hunting ground and as dog-training site. The unit was dedicated for use for field trials in the 1960s but horses and most hunting was eventually banned in order to protect various native species; pheasant hunting is allowed. A total of 4.75 miles (7.64 km) of trails exists between both tracts, which individually include a main, looped pathway.

=== Skookumchuck Wildlife Area Unit ===
The Skookumchuck Wildlife Area Unit is located downstream of the Skookuchuck Dam. The 883-acre (357 ha) parcel contains a mix of habitats, including grassland, forest, meadow, orchard, and wetlands. Various species in the unit include pheasant and elk, and salmon and steelhead exist in the Skookumchuck River. The unit is under a partnership agreement between the WDFW and the owner of the land, TransAlta. Hunting of fowl and fishing in the river is allowed.

=== Violet Prairie Wildlife Area Unit ===
The Violet Prairie Wildlife Area Unit is located east of Tenino on Old Highway 99. The lands, originally a 1,567-acre (634 ha) ranch owned by Dr. William Barnett, were purchased by The Conservation Fund in June 2021. The unit was completely acquired by the WDFW in 2024 and listed at approximately 1,500 acres (610 ha). Until that year, the prairie was closed to public access due to the necessity to determine how visitation would affect certain parts of the protected grounds. The prairie was opened for public use by 2025 and visitors can participate in several recreational activities including hiking and hunting; horses may be ridden within the grounds.

The preserve is home to the endangered Mazama pocket gopher as well as various creatures listed under the Species of Greatest Conservation Need program, including the Oregon vesper sparrow, and butterflies such as the Puget blue, and the Taylor's checkerspot.

The soil at Violet Prairie is sediment deposited after the Last Glacial Period. Precipitation drains quickly through the ground leaving the grassland drier than is typical in western Washington. As the prairie was historically cleared of trees and other brush by indigenous people through controlled burns, and had been used for agricultural and livestock feeding since early pioneer settlement in the 1800s, the WDFW allows cattle to continue to graze the lands. Though an official study had not yet been conducted as of 2025, anecdotal evidence suggests bare soil from livestock feeding allows native seeds and vegetation to replenish the prairie while keeping fire dangers at low levels; native species are also suggested to rebound in numbers due to the nature of the grazing allowance.

=== West Rocky Prairie Unit ===
The West Rocky Prairie Unit, also known as the West Rocky Prairie Wildlife Area, is located near Tenino. The unit is 119.0 acres (48.2 ha) and contains Oregon white oak, Oregon ash, Douglas fir, and maple. In 2023, the WDFW undertook a tree-thinning operation to restore the prairie oak habitat by removing heavy densities of ash, fir, and maple. The project would also overhaul the roads in the parcel.

== Other protected areas ==
Prairies existing outside of the Scatter Creek Wildlife Area and its units include the grasslands of Colvin Ranch, located approximately southwest of Tenino. Originally the homestead of Ignatius Colvin in 1865, the land is protected under the Grassland Reserve Program (GRP). The association provides payment to landowners to help preserve and restore native prairies while continuing to farm the lands. Cattle at the Colvin Ranch eat non-native grasses, allowing native flowering plants to spread. Listed with the GRP in May 2005, the Colvin property was the first Washington state parcel to join the program.

== Environment and ecology ==
Idaho fescue is one of the grasses native to the Scatter Creek prairies. As part of the restoration of the Glacial Heritage unit in late 2000, grass plugs of Idaho fescue were planted at the site. The grasses were grown by prisoners at McNeil Island Corrections Center, using seeds previously collected at the protected wildlife site.

Other native plants include blue camas, chocolate lily, and purple-stemmed aster. Sunflowers and a variety of violets grow naturally during the spring seasons. Water howellia grow in the wetland areas of some units.

Native berries that grow in the prairie units include blackberry, raspberry, saskatoon berry, and serviceberry. Additional bulb and root plants include wild carrots and yampa.

Invasive plants, such as Scotch broom, have been consistently removed during the restoration of the units. Removal of Scotch broom began in 2000; the rose checker mallow, which had not been seen in Washington state since 1983, was found in the Scatter Creek Wildlife Unit during the efforts. Early settlers introduced invasive oats, and a pasture grass known as bent grass.

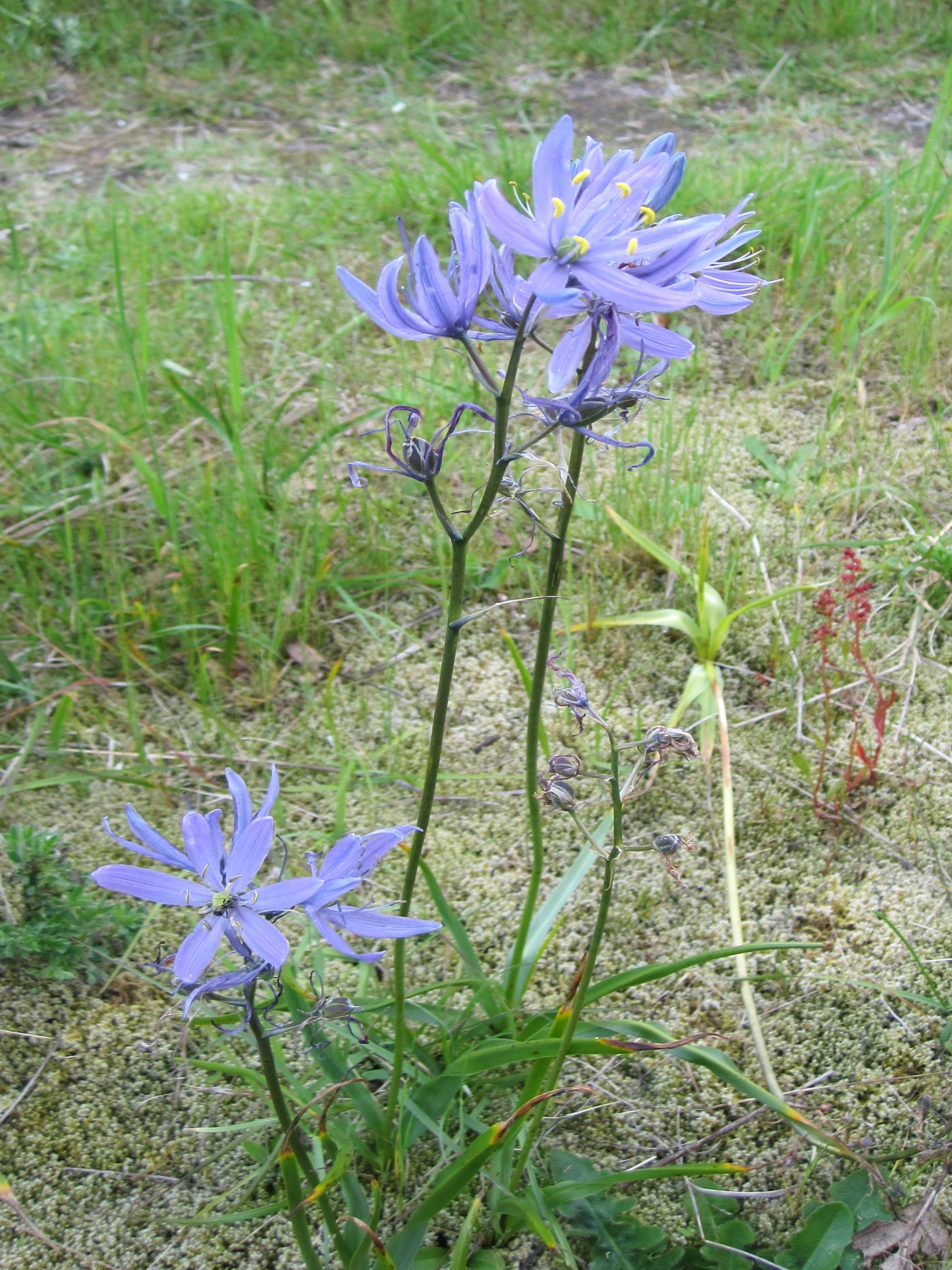
Camas (Camassia quamash)

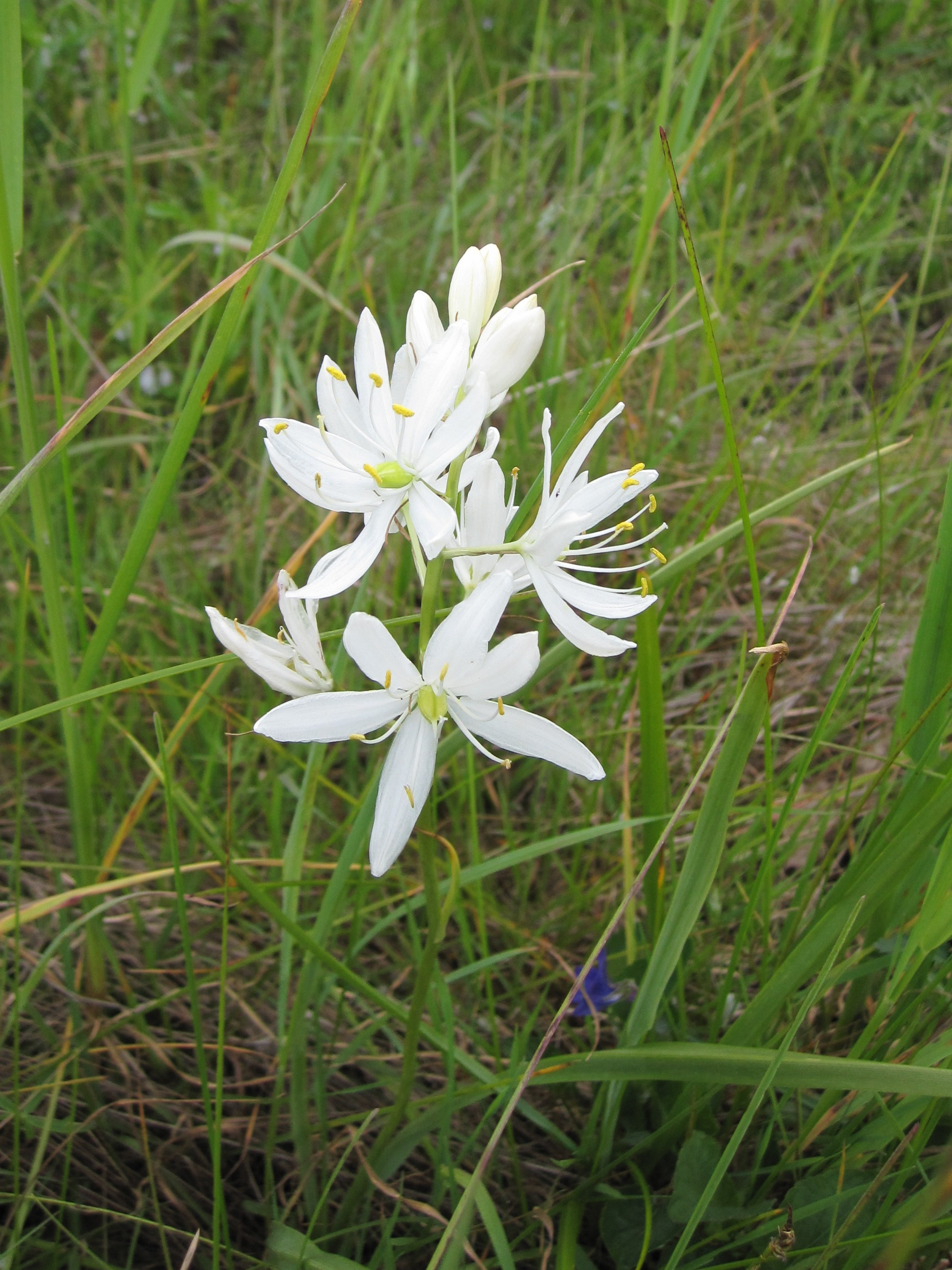
White morph of Camassia quamash

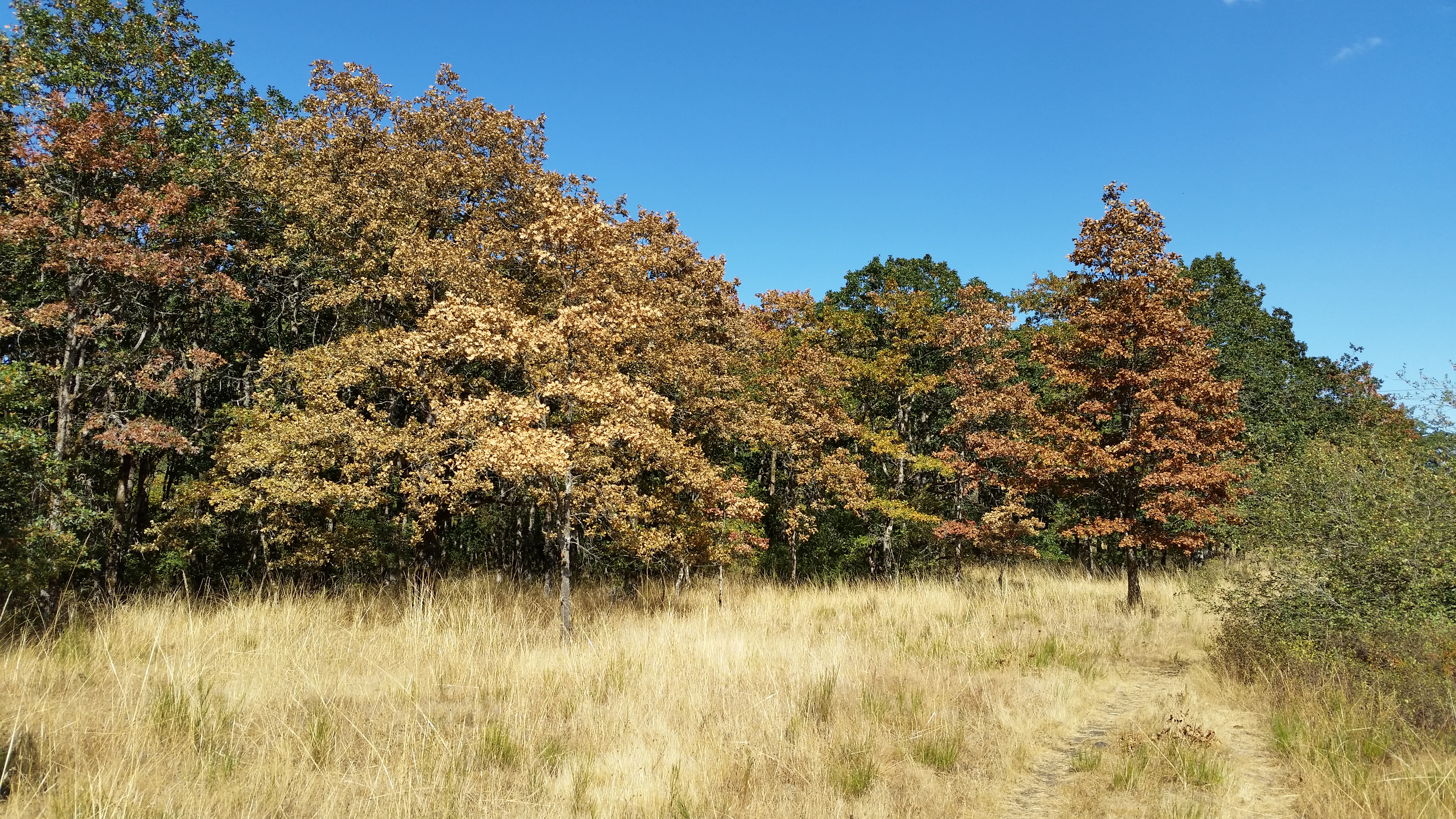
Garry oaks (Quercus garryana) with senescing leaves

== Wildlife ==
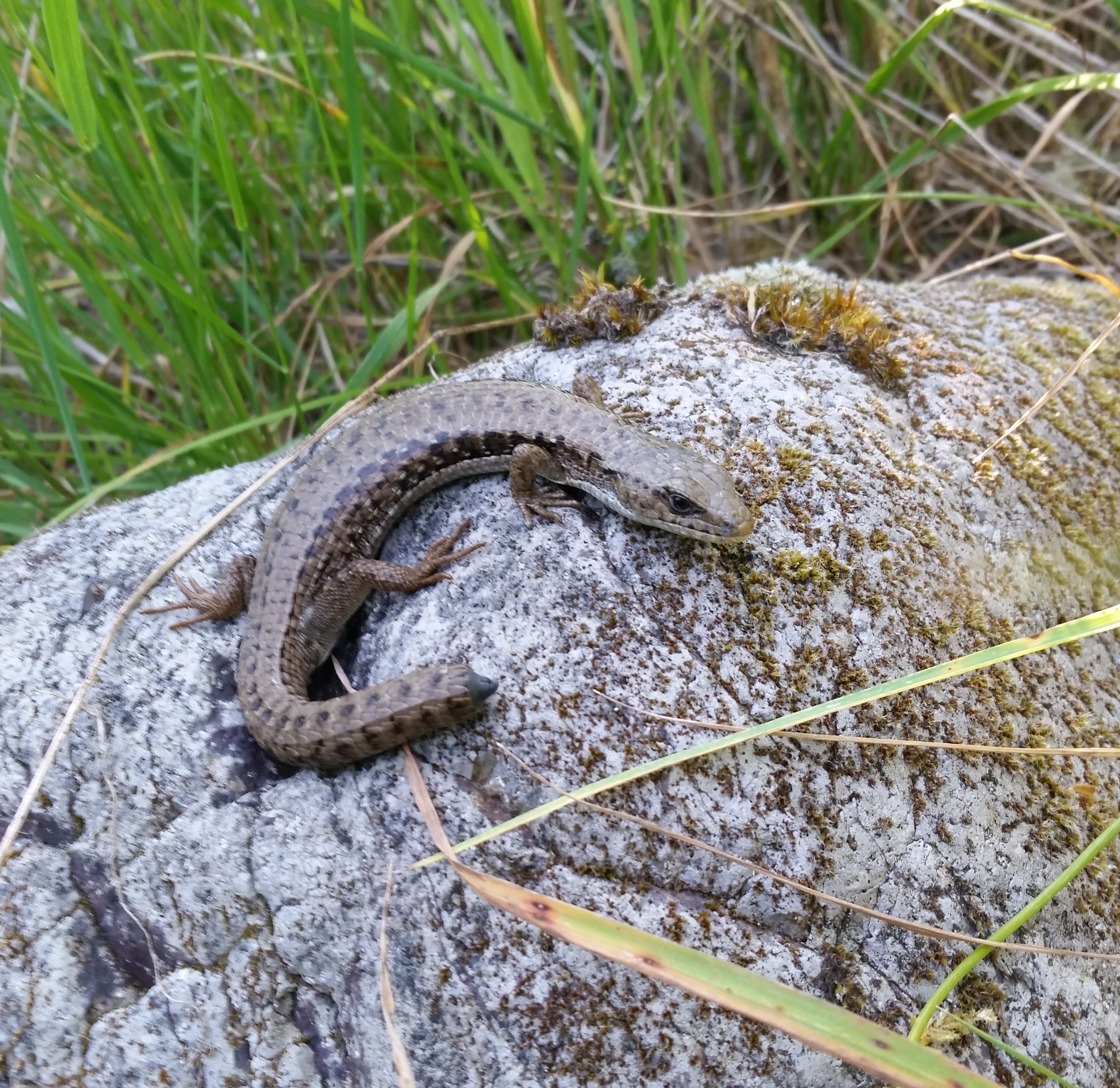
Northern alligator lizard

=== Amphibians and reptiles ===
Pond turtles and Oregon spotted frogs, endangered and declining in the state, are native to the prairie units.

=== Birds ===
Restoration efforts in the early 2000s led to the return of native birds such as Western bluebirds and white-tailed kites. The lands also include killdeer, kingfishers, meadowlark, raptor, and Savannah sparrow.

=== Butterflies ===
Two rare butterfly species, the Whulge checkerspot and Mardon skipper are located among the Scatter Creek units. The Mardon skipper was listed on Washington state's endangered species list.

=== Mammals ===
Pocket gophers and Western gray squirrels are located throughout the Scatter Creek units. Predators such as bobcat, coyote, and fox, along with herbivores such as deer and rabbits, live among the units. Aquatic or water-dwelling mammals include beaver, muskrat, and otter.

== Recreation ==
The two Scatter Creek sections contain looped hiking trails. The South Unit is open to horseback riding and the waters of Scatter Creek are open to recreational fishing.

== See also ==
- List of geographic features in Thurston County, Washington
- List of parks and recreation in Thurston County, Washington
