= Billy Frank Jr. Nisqually National Wildlife Refuge =

National Wildlife Refuge near Puget Sound

- IUCN category IV (habitat/species management area)
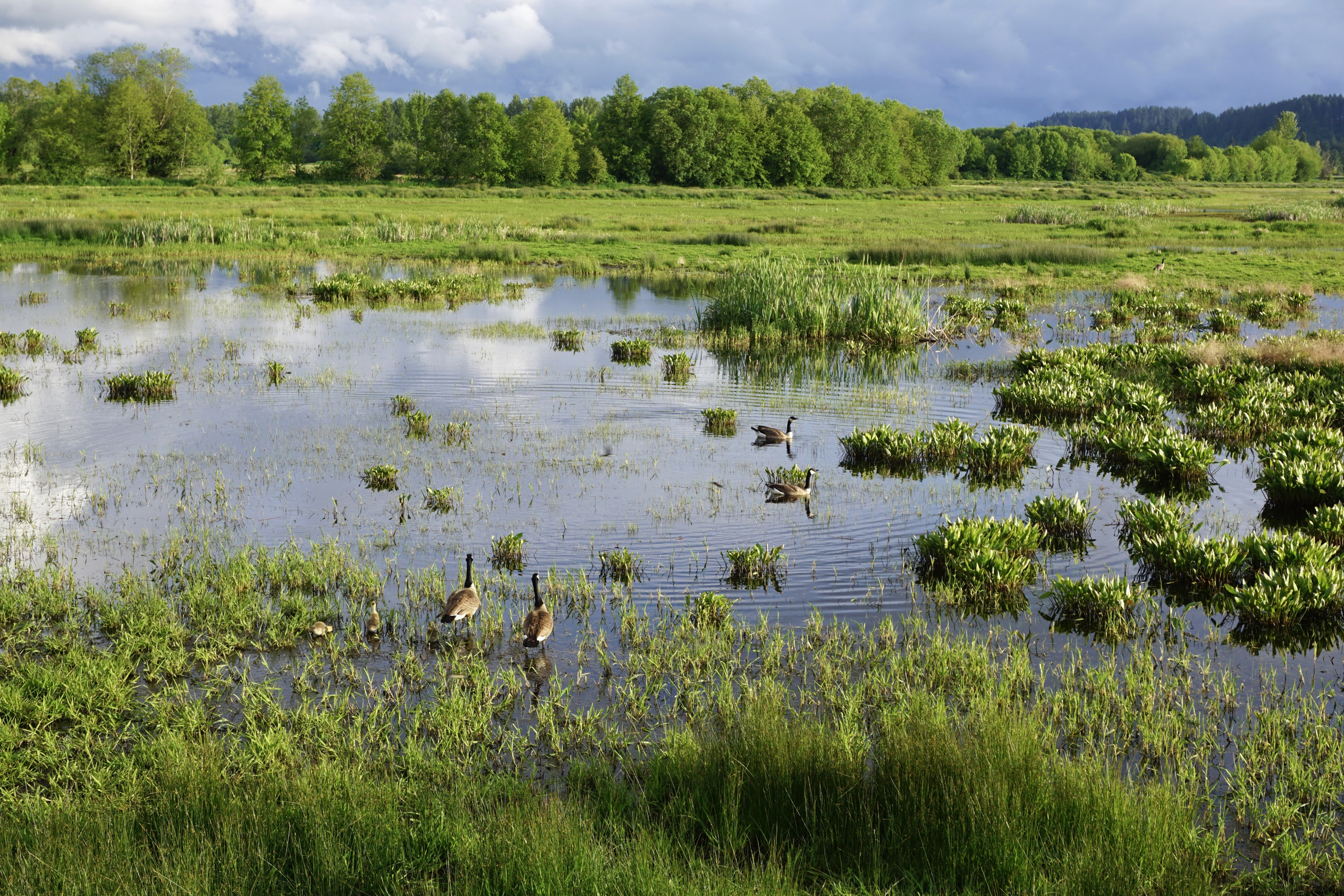
- Refuge in March 2025
- Interactive map of Refuge location
- Location: Thurston and Pierce counties, Washington, USA
- Nearest city: Lacey, WA
- Coordinates: 47°04′57″N 122°43′18″W
- Area: 4,529.21 acres (18.3291 km^{2})
- Established: 1974
- Named for: Billy Frank, Jr.
- Visitors: 380,000 (in 2024)
- Governing body: United States Fish and Wildlife Service
- Website: Billy Frank Jr. Nisqually NWR

The Billy Frank Jr. Nisqually National Wildlife Refuge is a wildlife preserve operated by the United States Fish and Wildlife Service on the Nisqually River Delta near Puget Sound in northeastern Thurston County, Washington and northwestern Pierce County, Washington. The refuge is located just off Interstate 5, between the cities of Tacoma and Olympia.

== History ==
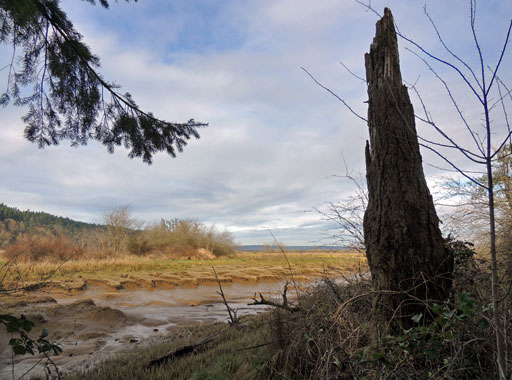
Treaty Tree where the Treaty of Medicine Creek was signed

=== Background ===
The oral history of the Nisqually describes the Nisqually basin as the point of origin of their people. Their endonym, dxʷsqʷaliʔabš, 'people of the grass', comes from the grasses that grew in the basin. The delta was relied upon to provide sustenance and the food sources were abundant enough for 14 permanent villages and a seasonal economy. Salmon was caught via a variety of techniques and the people were able to hunt a diverse array of wildlife, including various species of waterfowl, game, and sea mammals. The grass and woodlands in the area were used to gather seasonal fruits such as berries, grow crops such as camas, and provide timber for the construction of weirs and canoes. The Nisqually practiced cultural burning and, through managed modification, created a sustainable habitat for millenniums.

In the 1830s, a fort was built near the Nisqually basin and fur trading began in earnest, leading to the loss of beaver dams and the natural wetlands. Yearning for more economic diversity, ranching began in 1839, and severe grazing damages led to a growth of trees on the prairies. By the 1850s, farmers and missionaries began migrating to the area, demanding for the Nisqually to be relinquished of their lands. The Medicine Creek Treaty was signed in 1854 and the signatory tribes, though given the right to fish, were removed to reservations, ceding all other lands under the treaty to the federal government. A brief armed conflict, known as the Puget Sound War, resulted over dissatisfaction with the treaty, but ended due to a combination of the execution of Leschi (one of the leaders on the Native side) and federal expansion of the lands conveyed under the treaty.

A transcontinental railroad was introduced to the area in 1883, and with it an increase in migration, logging, and large-scale agriculture. The timber production, due to erosion and increase to water temperatures, decimated the salmon habitat. Land reclamation was increased due to needs for farming. The building of dikes also became another cause in the decrease to the aquatic ecosystem. By the 1910s, local power companies began constructing dams on the Nisqually River, further destroying salmon spawning and migration. Despite an attempt in the 1950s that added fish ladders and other modes of opportunity for salmon to swim around the dams, one line of Chinook salmon was declared extinct.

=== Creation ===
A large port was planned beginning in 1965 that would have filled the basin. The depth and openness of the basin was considered desirable, but community efforts involving numerous groups (including the Nisqually people, environmental groups, and local landowners) blocked the build. A state department, known at the time as the Department of Game, slowly began buying up hundred-acre parcels in the valley and they entered into a partnership with the Nisqually Tribe to combat the creation of the port. By 1970, widespread support against the port was reported and such organizations as the Nisqually Delta Association and Nisqually River Task Force were formed to study the watershed and its critical status as a necessary habitat. Reports from the studies showed that the port would be a catastrophic detriment to the already decimated valley and proposals, quickly adopted, were outlined to repair the Nisqually basin. Protections of the estuaries, upstream habitats, and Nisqually tribal right were emphasized and no port would be built. Further studies called for the land to be protected under a federal wildlife refuge, though proposals allowed for continued farming of the valley and upstream logging but with more stringent rules.

The 12.6 km^{2} refuge was created in January 1974 after the purchase of a large farm. Additional large tracts were purchased, or planned to be added. Further court cases solidified the Nisqually tribal fishing rights and that the state "had a legal obligation to protect salmon habitat".

The refuge is to provide habitat and nesting areas for waterfowl and other migratory birds. It includes a protected estuary, salt marshes and open mudflats, freshwater marshes, open grassland, and riparian woodland and brush.

A separate unit that is part of the Nisqually reserve, known as the Black River National Wildlife Refuge, is located in the wetlands of the Black River near Littlerock. The in-development refuge was officially established in 1996 and is planned to encompass 3,600 acres (1,500 ha).

On December 18, 2015, President Barack Obama signed the Billy Frank Jr. Tell Your Story Act into law, redesignating the wildlife refuge in honor of Nisqually tribe leader and treaty rights activist Billy Frank, Jr.. Frank, who died in 2014, had been arrested approximately 50 times during protests against the port build, as well as for Nisqually tribal rights, in the 1960s and 1970s, also was a central figure in restoration efforts. The bill also established the Medicine Creek Treaty National Memorial within the refuge to commemorate the Treaty of Medicine Creek. The national memorial is where the treaty was signed at the Treaty Tree, which is only accessible by boat up McAllister Creek.

== Restoration ==
State legislation enacted early attempts at restoration of the watershed in the mid-1980s, creating the Nisqually River Management Plan and Nisqually River Council. The power companies agreed to proper flow rates as well as the creation of the Clear Creek hatchery. In the 1990s, additional lands surrounding the Nisqually valley were purchased and added to the refuge as a buffer against encroaching residential growth. Tidelands began to be restored, starting in 1996, and culminating in 2009 with hundreds of acres of habitat, including the revival of 50% of salt marsh areas, restored. Large dikes were removed, and additional protections were taken on upstream rivers, lands, and valleys.

== Wildlife ==
The wildlife refuge is home to the Nisqually River Delta, which has the unique status as Washington's largest relatively undisturbed estuary. The confluence of the freshwater Nisqually River and the saltwater south Puget Sound has created a variety of unique environments, each rich in nutrients and natural resources for the local wildlife. The delta provides habitats for more than 300 different species of fish and wildlife.

In 1904 the Brown Farm Dike, five miles long, was created to protect farmland from tidal surge, resulting in a loss of important habitat for young fish, birds and marine mammals such as harbor seals. As part of a long running project to restore the estuary, in 2009, a new 10,000 foot dike was installed behind the old dike and four miles of the old Brown Farm Dike were removed. This enabled the tidal flows to reclaim 762 acres to the estuary.

Sea life features 18 species of fish located in one of three habitats: riverine, estuarine, or the Nisqually Reach nearshore. Large populations of fall Chinook salmon, starry flounder and shiner perch offer a sampling of the fish that are abundantly available. The saltmarshes and mudflats are located outside of the dikes. Rich in nutrients, they are the home to clams, crabs, shrimp and worms, which in turn feed ducks, gulls and herons. Over 20,000 birds, made up of 275 different migrating species, use the freshwater marshes and grasslands for breeding, resting or wintering. The most abundant bird types include raptors, shorebirds and songbirds. Larger animals such as hawks and coyotes feast in the grassland due to the presence of mice and voles. The riparian woodland and brush habitats contain many amphibians, mammals and reptiles.

== Recreation ==
The refuge contains approximately 5 miles (8.0 km) of flat trails that course over the tidal areas of the estuary. The elevated Nisqually Estuary Boardwalk Trail, which extends 1-mile (1.6 km) into the tidal flats, as well as other wooden boardwalks and gravel trails provide viewing opportunities of various birds and aquatic species.

== See also ==
- List of geographic features in Thurston County, Washington
- List of parks and recreation in Thurston County, Washington
- List of National Wildlife Refuges
- List of national memorials of the United States
