= Rochester, Washington =

Place in Washington State

- CDP
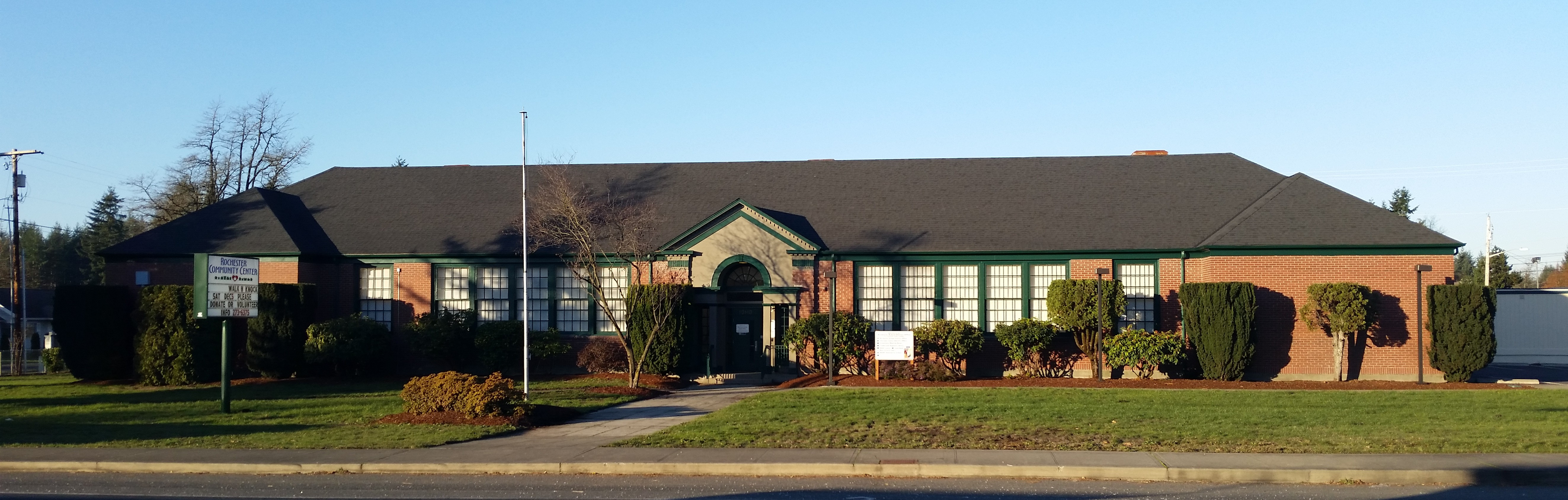
- Rochester Community Center
- Interactive location map of Rochester
- Coordinates: 46°49′25″N 123°5′0″W
- Country: United States
- State: Washington
- County: Thurston
- Founded: 1852; 174 years ago
- Platted: 1890; 136 years ago

Area
  - Total: 2.3 sq mi (6.0 km^{2})
  - Land: 2.3 sq mi (6.0 km^{2})
  - Water: 0 sq mi (0.0 km^{2})
- Elevation: 144 ft (44 m)

Population (2020)
  - Total: 6,064
  - Density: 790/sq mi (305.1/km^{2})
- Time zone: UTC-8 (Pacific (PST))
  - Summer (DST): UTC-7 (PDT)
- ZIP Code: 98579
- Area code: 360, 564
- FIPS code: 53-59110
- GNIS feature ID: 1512611

Rochester (/ˈrɒtʃɛstər/) is a census-designated place (CDP) in Thurston County, Washington, United States. It was founded in 1852, and the 2020 census recorded its population at 6,064. According to the United States Census Bureau, the CDP has a total area of 2.3 square miles (6.0 square kilometers), all of it land. Rochester Schools had 2,105 students registered in the 2021-22 School Year.

== History ==
Rochester was platted in 1890, and named after Rochester, Indiana, the native home of a first settler. An early variant name was "Key".

== Demographics ==
Historical population
Census	Pop.	Note	%±
1990	1,250		—
2000	1,829		46.3%
2010	2,388		30.6%
2020	6,064		153.9%
U.S. Decennial Census; 2020 Census

As of the census of 2000, there were 1,829 people, 647 households, and 505 families residing in the CDP. The population density was 790.2 people per square mile (305.7/km^{2}). There were 677 housing units at an average density of 292.5/sq mi (113.2/km^{2}). The racial makeup of the CDP was 88.41% White, 0.16% African American, 1.69% Native American, 0.93% Asian, 0.11% Pacific Islander, 5.52% from other races, and 3.17% from two or more races. Hispanic or Latino of any race were 10.39% of the population. 12.8% were of German, 11.5% Irish, 7.8% American, 7.5% Norwegian, 5.6% English and 5.4% Scottish ancestry.

There were 647 households, out of which 41.6% had children under the age of 18 living with them, 62.4% were married couples living together, 9.9% had a female householder with no husband present, and 21.9% were non-families. 17.2% of all households were made up of individuals, and 5.7% had someone living alone who was 65 years of age or older. The average household size was 2.83 and the average family size was 3.14.

In the CDP, the age distribution of the population shows 30.1% under the age of 18, 8.6% from 18 to 24, 31.9% from 25 to 44, 21.3% from 45 to 64, and 8.1% who were 65 years of age or older. The median age was 32 years. For every 100 females, there were 101.0 males. For every 100 females age 18 and over, there were 104.6 males.

The median income for a household in the CDP was $43,090, and the median income for a family was $44,777. Males had a median income of $40,676 versus $26,518 for females. The per capita income for the CDP was $14,912. About 6.2% of families and 7.7% of the population were below the poverty line, including 6.2% of those under age 18 and 8.6% of those age 65 or over.

== Arts and culture ==
=== Festivals and events ===
Rochester hosts an annual Swede Day festival, usually in June. It began as an honor to recognize the Swedish culture and heritage of the town's early beginnings in the late 19th and early 20th centuries. A parade, a maypole dance, and traditional Swedish cuisine highlight the event. The celebration first began in 1978, replacing an annual Strawberry Festival held in the town.

=== Historic Buildings and sites ===
Swede Hall, built in 1939, replaced an original hall built in 1911 at nearby Independence Valley. Constructed in a style similar to traditional Swedish halls, the building received approximately $200,000 during the Washington state budget in 2019 to make necessary improvements to the 80 year-old hall's infrastructure.

== Parks and recreation ==
The Black River Habitat Management Area, the Glacial Heritage Preserve, and the Scatter Creek Unit surround the community. Mima Mounds Natural Area Preserve is north of the town.

The South Sound Speedway, a Figure 8 racetrack, is directly east of the downtown area.

== Education ==
- Grand Mound Elementary School
- H.E.A.R.T
- Rochester Co-op Preschool
- Rochester High School
- Rochester Primary School
- Rochester Middle School

The Rochester Primary School was built in 1936 and, as of 2023, is the headquarters for the school district.

== See also ==
- Scatter Creek Unit
