= Capitol Land Trust =

US non-profit conservation organization

- Formation: September 9, 1987; 39 years ago
- Type: 501(c)(3)
- Tax ID no.: EIN 911413484
- Purpose: Land and habitat conservation
- Location: Olympia, Washington
- Revenue: ▼$3.12 million (2023)
- Expenses: ▼$1.31 million (2023)
- Website: capitollandtrust.org

Capitol Land Trust (CLT) is a 501(c)(3) non-profit conservation organization based in Olympia, Washington, United States. It was founded on September 9, 1987 and became tax-exempt in April 1994. As of 2025, CLT had 6,538 acres (2,646 ha) owned, under easement, or protected by other means in Grays Harbor, Lewis, Mason, and Thurston counties.

The organization's mission statement is to "strategically conserve vital natural areas and working lands in the South Puget Sound and Chehalis Basin watersheds, for their ecological and community benefits."

In 2023, CLT had $3.12 million in revenue, $1.31 million in expenses and $23.5 million in total assets.

In 2025, CLT partnered with Conservation Northwest and Port Blakely Tree Farms to put 2,357 acres (954 ha) near Capitol State Forest under a permanent conservation easement for $8 million, potentially preserving wildlife access between Cascade and Olympic Mountains.

== Public preserves ==
The organization manages 5 nature preserves, four of which are open to the public as of 2026:

- Bayshore Preserve – 78 acres (32 ha) near the western shore of Oakland Bay
- Darlin Creek Preserve – 312 acres (126 ha) near Black River
- Hilburn Preserve – 10 acres (4.0 ha) near Shelton
- Inspiring Kids Preserve - 113 acres (46 ha) on the eastern shore of Henderson Inlet, planned to be completed in 2027.
- Randall Preserve – 7 acres (2.8 ha) near the southern end of Eld Inlet
