= Littlerock, Washington =

Unincorporated community in Washington, United States

- Unincorporated community
- Interactive map of Littlerock, Washington
- Coordinates: 46°54′06″N 123°01′05″W
- Country: United States
- State: Washington
- County: Thurston
- Elevation: 144 ft (44 m)
- Time zone: UTC-8 (Pacific (PST))
  - Summer (DST): UTC-7 (PDT)
- ZIP Code: 98556
- Area code(s): 360, 564
- GNIS feature ID: 1512396

Littlerock is an unincorporated community in Thurston County, Washington, United States. Littlerock is 11 miles (18 km) southwest of Olympia. The town is west of Interstate 5 and Maytown.

Littlerock is located near several protected lands, such as the Mima Mounds Natural Area Preserve and Capitol State Forest.

== History ==
The first white settler in the area, Thomas Elliott Rutledge, filed a claim for 160 acres (65 ha) in 1854 and named his settlement "Black River". The community was later renamed "Little Rock" or "Littlerock" for a mounting stone on the Rutledge property; a post office called Littlerock has been in operation since 1879.

In 1909, Littlerock had two shingle mills with 330 employees, a lumber camp and saw mill, which produced 20,000 feet (6,096.0 m) of lumber daily. A Methodist church, a school with 3 teachers, a grocery store, furniture and hardware stores were also built.

In 2020, the Washington Commercial Aviation Coordinating Commission nominated a site north of Littlerock for the site of a new major airport to serve the Seattle metropolitan area alongside Seattle–Tacoma International Airport (SEA). A similar site was proposed in the 1990s for a study that ultimately resulted in an expansion of SEA. The Littlerock site was determined to be infeasible due to community opposition and its potential air corridor passing over Olympia.

== Parks and recreation ==
The Mima Mounds Natural Area Preserve, declared a National Natural Landmark, is located outside of the town center. North of Littlerock is Darlin Creek Preserve, a conservation site under Capitol Land Trust. Other nearby protected areas include the Glacial Heritage Preserve and the Black River Habitat Management Area. The community lies near the border of the Capitol State Forest.

The Gate to Belmore Trail, a rail trail, courses through the community.
