= Mima Mounds Natural Area Preserve =

Natural area in Thurston County, Washington, United States

- IUCN category III (natural monument or feature)
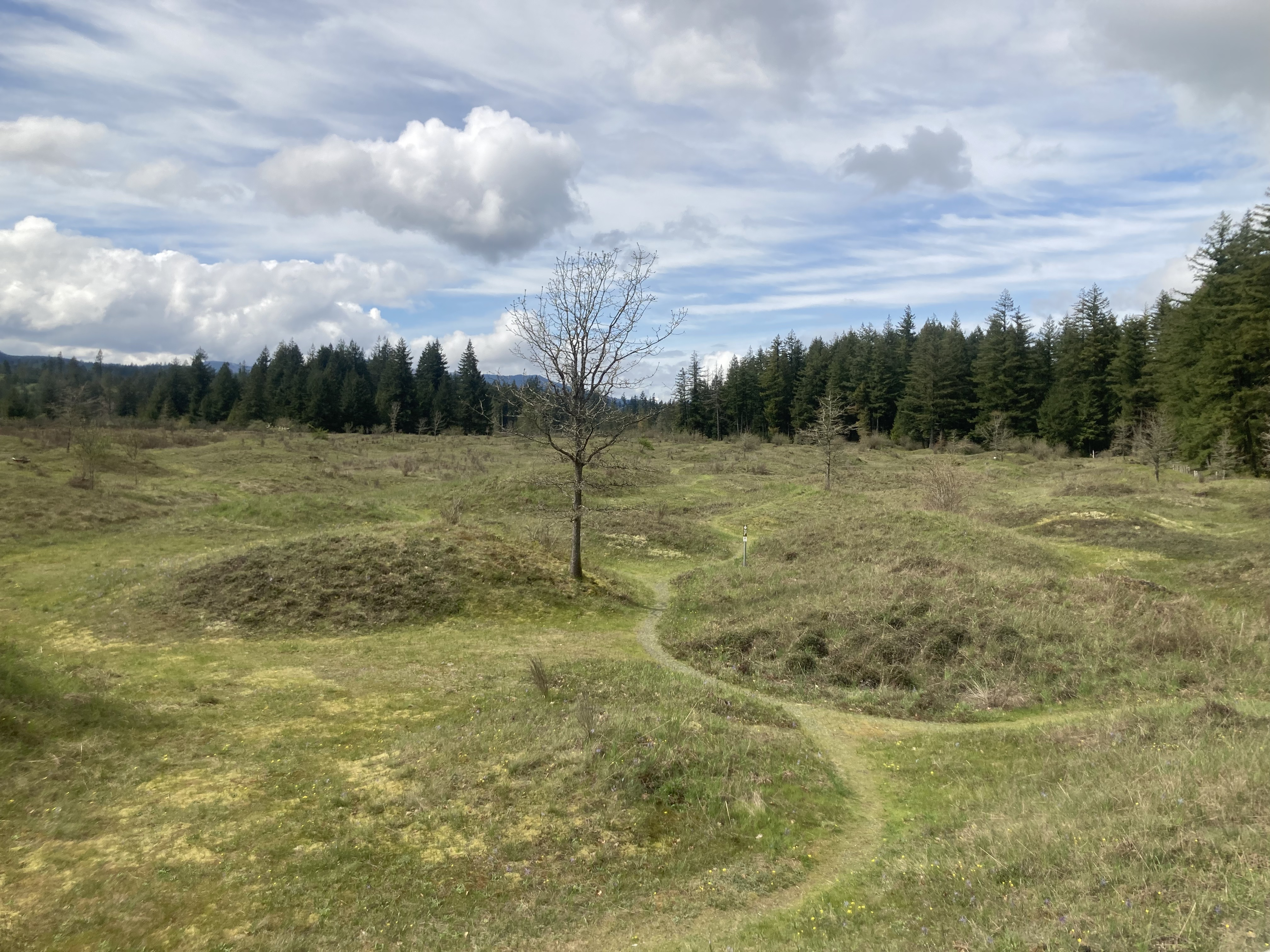
- Mima mounds in May 2023
- Interactive map of Preserve location
- Location: Southwest corner of Thurston County, Washington, United States
- Nearest town: Littlerock, Washington
- Coordinates: 46°53′N 123°03′W
- Area: 756 acres (306 ha)
- Designation: National Natural Landmark
- Established: 1976
- Governing body: Washington Department of Natural Resources
- Website: Department of Natural Resources - Mima Mounds

Mima Mounds Natural Area Preserve is a state-protected Natural Area in the southwest corner of Thurston County, Washington. The site was designated as a National Natural Landmark in 1966 as an example to protect mima mounds.

== History ==
The mounds were formed approximately 15,000 years around the time of the last glacial retreat. Indigenous people used controlled burns at the site to maintain the landscape as a prairie, allowing vegetation used for food or medicine to prosper. The origins of the word, mima (MY-ma), has been reported to be unknown, though it may mean, "newness", under the language of the Chehalis people.

The mounds were documented by Charles Wilkes in May 1841 during a global expedition. Wilkes speculated the mounds were burial sites of Native Americans, but after digging into a few of the features, no relics were found by his team. The Wilkes research of Mima Mounds is the first known scientific attempt at the preserve.

In 1966, the mounds were designated a National Natural Landmark and the area was established as the Mima Mounds Natural Area Preserve in 1976.

=== Formation theories ===
The formations have been suspected to be burial mounds of indigenous people, piles created by either floods or glaciers, or remnants of where trees once stood after a forest was devasted by a tornado. The Chehalis tribe has a history of stories mentioning that the mounds are from the remains of large sea mammals, coming to rest after being washed away during a large flood. A more common theory, which emerged in the 1940s, states that the mounds were formed by burrowing animals, most likely gophers. In the 1990s, another hypothesis suggested the landscape was formed by earthquakes. As of 2025, no consensus has been reached in the scientific community on how the mounds were formed.

== Geography and geology ==
The mounds were once part of a larger stretch of a prairie ecosystem encompassing approximately 180,000 acres (73,000 ha), spanning from present-day Joint Base Lewis–McChord through Chehalis and into Oakville. The preserve is located between Capitol State Forest and the community of Littlerock. The preserve is listed as either over 600 acres (240 ha) or precisely at 756 acres (306 ha).

The site is located on an outwash plain of the Vashon Glacier. Immediately north of Mima Mounds was the southern reach of the Puget Lobe.

The mounds, also described as hillocks, are situated on a plain of underlying cobble that is most likely a remnant of a glacial lake. The volcanic rock, andesite, is heavily present in the mounds. The rock traveled from Mount Rainier during extensive flooding in the region when the Glacial Lake Carbon ice dam failed. Gravel, sand, and silt account for the remaining components of the features.

== Features ==
There are approximately 8-10 mounds per acre, measuring 1–7 feet (0.30–2.13 m) in height and having diameters 7–40 feet (2.1–12.2 m). Spaced relatively evenly, vegetative growth on the mounds include grass, moss, and wildflowers. A few of the hillocks contain trees.

== Ecology and environment ==
The landscape contains natural vegetation such as camas lilies, huckleberry, Indian plum, and salal. The mounds are usually covered in various shades of lichen and moss. Gophers have been native to the area since the glaciers retreated. The site contains 756 acres (306 ha) of Garry oak woodland, oak savanna, and prairie grasslands.

Golden paintbrush, once common on the prairie and at the preserve, is considered a threatened species. Invasive plants include Douglas fir and Scotch broom.

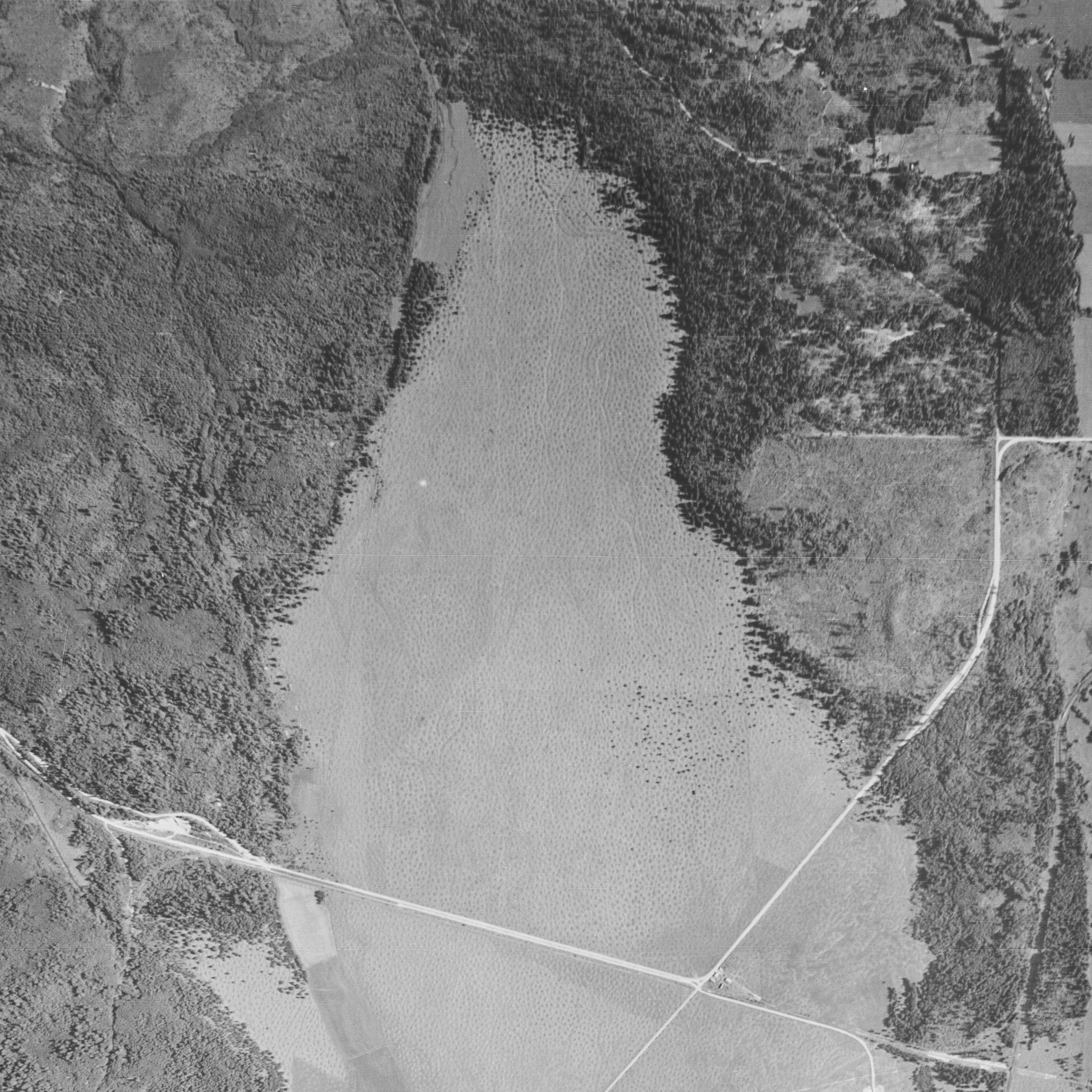
Mima area, June 1941

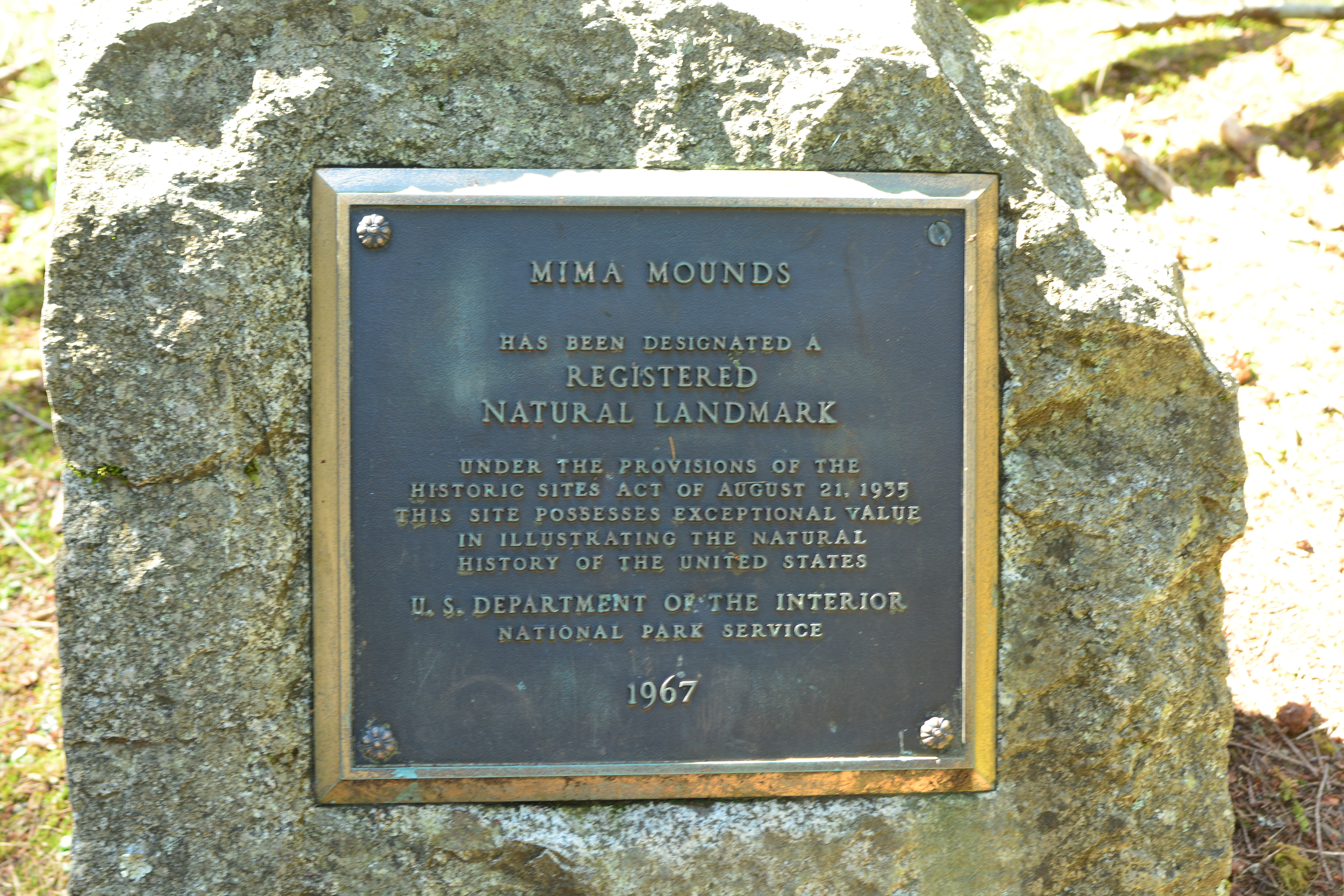
NPS plaque designating the landmark

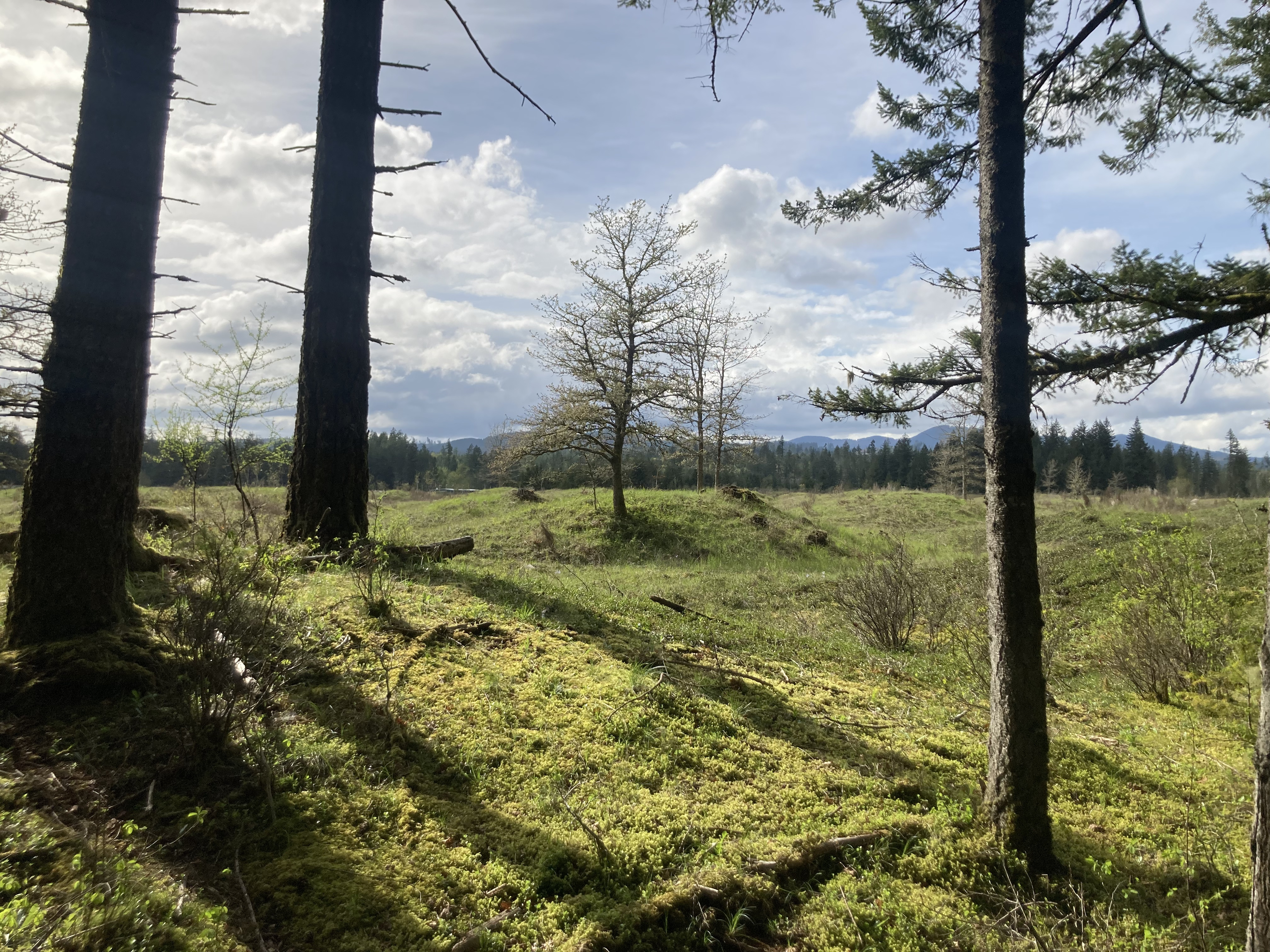
Trees and mounds, May 2023.

=== Butterflies ===
The preserve is host to wildflowers and many species of butterfly (some endangered), with activity between spring and early fall, mid-morning and mid-afternoon.

- Common wood-nymph
- Coenonympha tullia
- Vanessa cardui (rare; migratory)
- Vanessa atalanta
- Lorquin's admiral
- Boloria epithore (late April-May)
- Speyeria zerene
- Euphydryas editha taylori (endangered)
- Polites mardon (endangered)
- Polites sonora (late May-August)
- Ochlodes sylvanoides
- Papilio zelicaon (May, July-August)
- Papilio eurymedon (April-October)
- Papilio rutulus
- Anthocharis sara
- Callophrys augustinus
- Callophrys polios
- Icaricia icarioides blackmorei
- Glaucopsyche lygdamus (March-June)
- Great spangled fritillary (early June-August)
- Holly blue
- Parnassius clodius
- Monarch butterfly (rare; vagrant: not native to region)

== Recreation ==
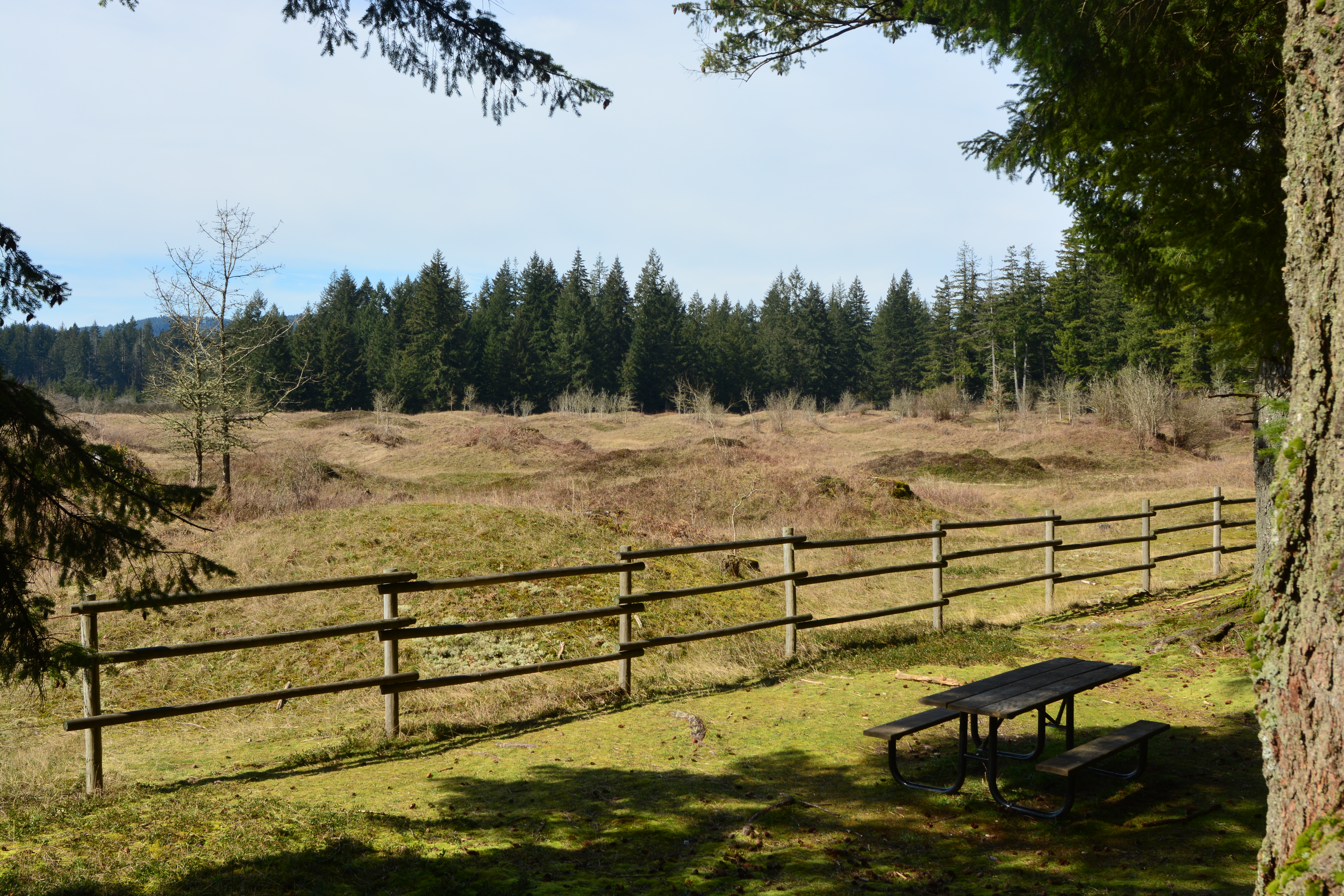
Picnic area with view of mounds, March 2021.

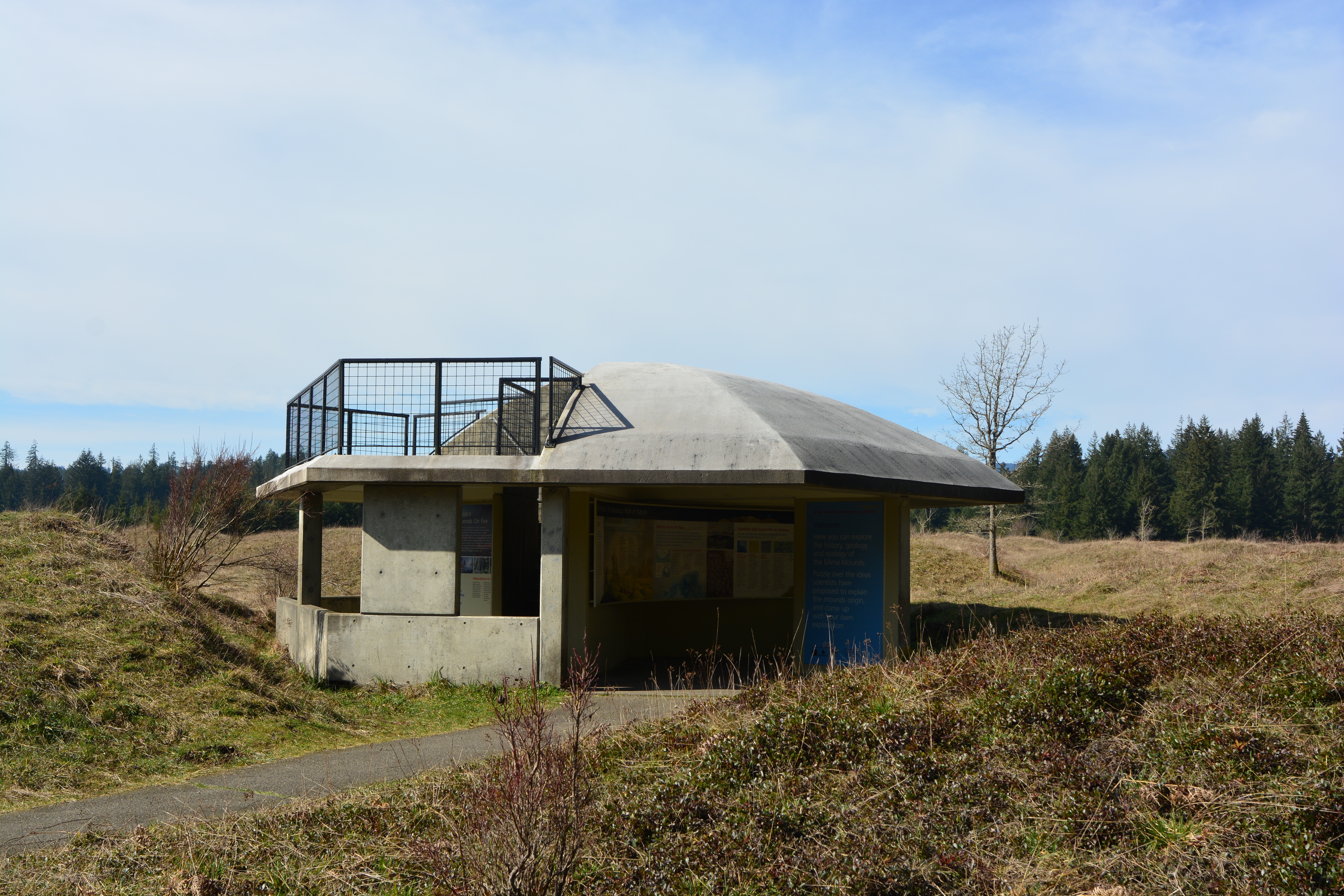
Observation structure with information graphics

A short, ADA-accessible 0.5 mile paved trail leads to a small interpretive shelter and observation deck with view of the prairie. A longer, unpaved gravel 1.5 mile loop trail to the south explores the mounds with possible views of Mount Rainier and Mount St. Helens.

== See also ==
- List of geographic features in Thurston County, Washington
- List of parks and recreation in Thurston County, Washington
- List of Washington Natural Area Preserves
- Mima, Washington
- Rocky Prairie
