= Rocky Prairie =

Prairie and protected area in Washington state

- Rocky Prairie Natural Area Preserve
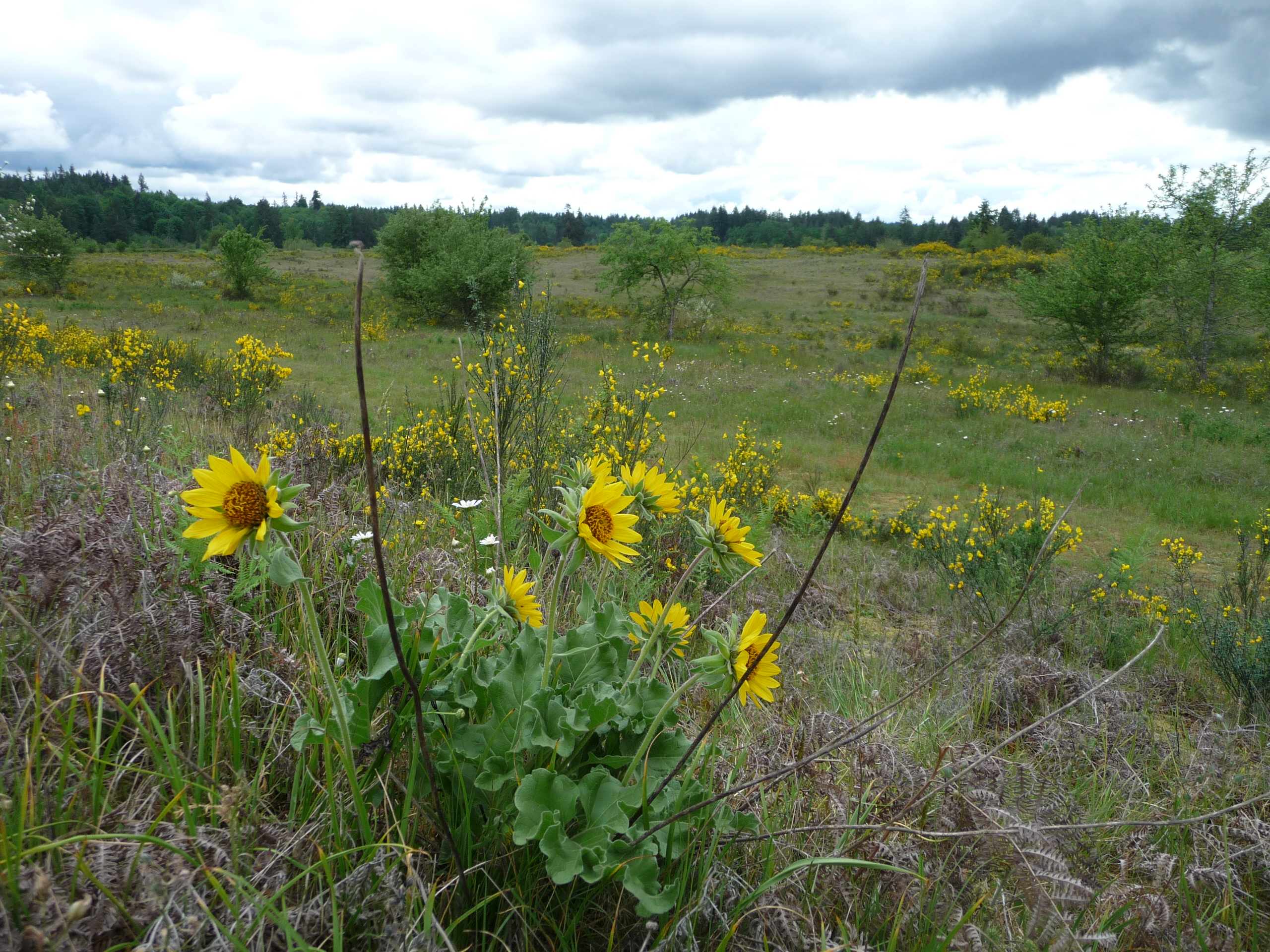
- Balsamorhiza deltoidea at Rocky Prairie
- Interactive map of Rocky Prairie
- Location: Thurston County, Washington
- Nearest town: Tenino, Washington
- Coordinates: 46°55′12.20″N 122°51′40.29″W
- Area: 810 acres (330 ha)
- Designation: Nature reserve
- Owner: Washington Natural Areas Program; Washington State Department of Natural Resources
- Website: Rocky Prairie Natural Area Preserve

Rocky Prairie is a Puget prairie that is about 56 miles (90 km) southwest of Seattle, Washington, and about 10 miles (16 km) south of Washington's capital city of Olympia. It sits very close to the Millersylvania State Park, the community of Maytown, and the city of Tenino.

Old Highway 99 runs through Rocky Prairie. The part of the prairie west of the highway is called West Rocky Prairie. Both the west and east sides of the prairie have various plant and animal species. Many of the plant species are flowering plants. Both sides also have areas of Mima mounds (not to be confused with the Mima mounds at Mima Mounds Natural Area Preserve about 10.5 kilometers or 6.5 miles to the west).

== History ==
Rocky Prairie and the other local prairies were formed around 17,000 BP (before present) during the Vashon Glaciation. The Vashon Glaciation was the time period in which the Cordilleran Ice Sheet extended south of the present-day US–Canadian border into Western Washington. The Vashon Glaciation was part of the Fraser Glaciation (the ice that had pushed through the Fraser River basin in British Columbia). This occurred during the Wisconsin Glaciation, the time period when ice sheets covered much of Canada and the northern United States. The Wisconsin Glaciation occurred during the last glacial period, a time when the Earth was more glaciated. This was the most recent glaciation of the Pleistocene Ice Age (the current ice age). The Pleistocene Ice Age is part of an even longer ice age called the Late Cenozoic Ice Age, which began 33.9 million BP with the formation of the Antarctic Ice Cap and continues to present day.

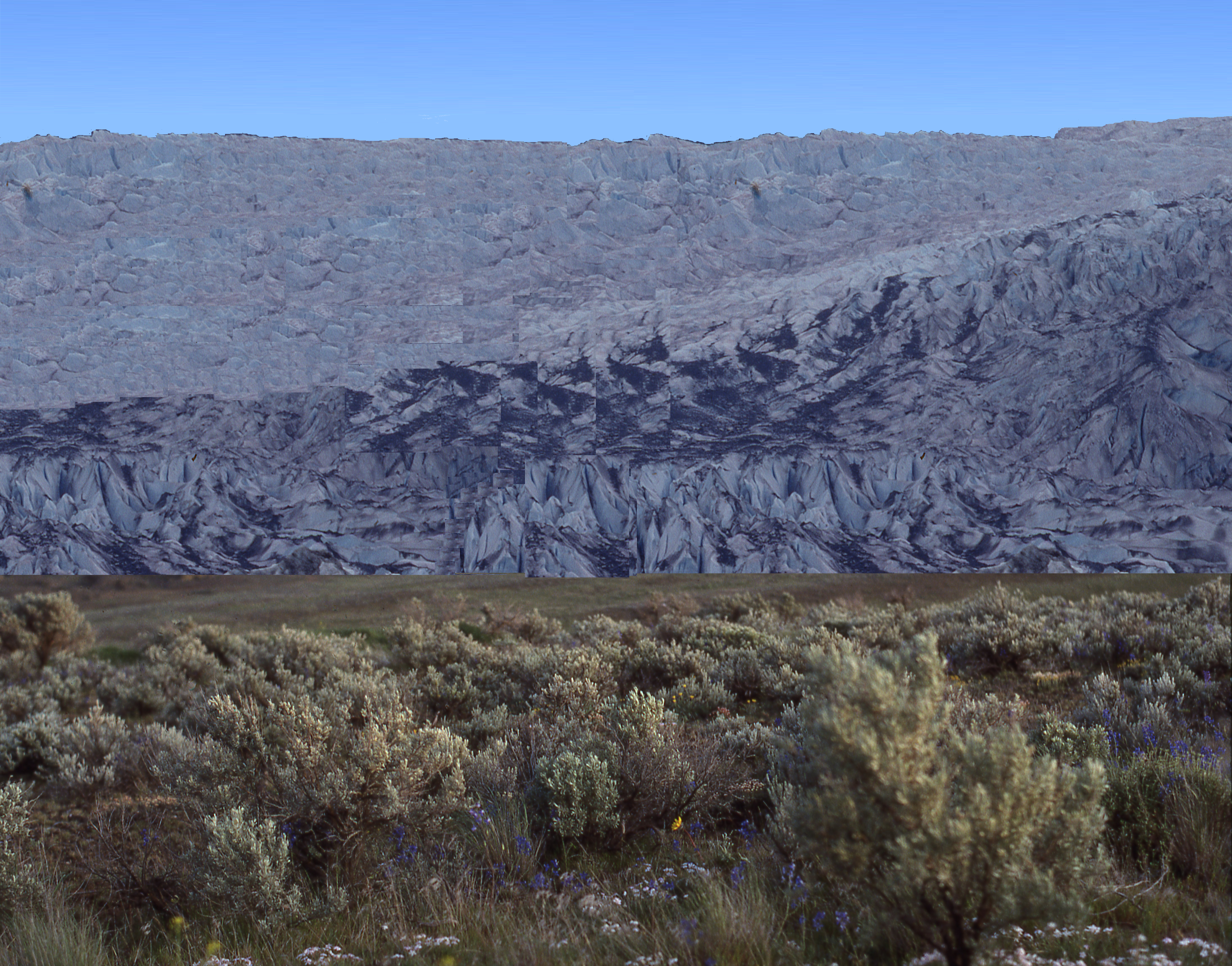
Artist's conception, glacier during the Vashon Glaciation

During the Vashon Glaciation, the Cordilleran Ice Sheet covered parts of Alaska and Canada. The portion that extended south of the Canadian border is called the Puget Lobe. Rocky Prairie was almost at the edge of where the glacier stopped, and was only under ice for a short period of time.

Pollen data collected from Battleground Lake (a lake about 123 kilometers (76 miles)to the southeast of Rocky Prairie) show that from 20,000 - 16,000 BP, annual temperatures in the area were about 6 ± 1 °C (10.8 ± 1.8 °F) colder than in present times (present times as of 1990). Annual precipitation was around 1 meter (39 in) less, meaning that precipitation was only about 24.5% of what it is in present times (present times as of 1990). At the glacier's edge, the wall of ice was around 200 meters (660 feet) high.

As the glaciers melted, they left behind sand and gravel. The sand and gravel drains water making the soils dry, particularly in the summer. Many of the plants that grew on these prairies were used as food or medicine by the early inhabitants. With the eventual encroachment of forest, the early inhabitants had to burn the prairies in order to maintain them. The practice went on for millennia, and is still continued today by conservation organizations. In current times, burning is also a way of controlling invasive non-native species.

=== Settler history ===
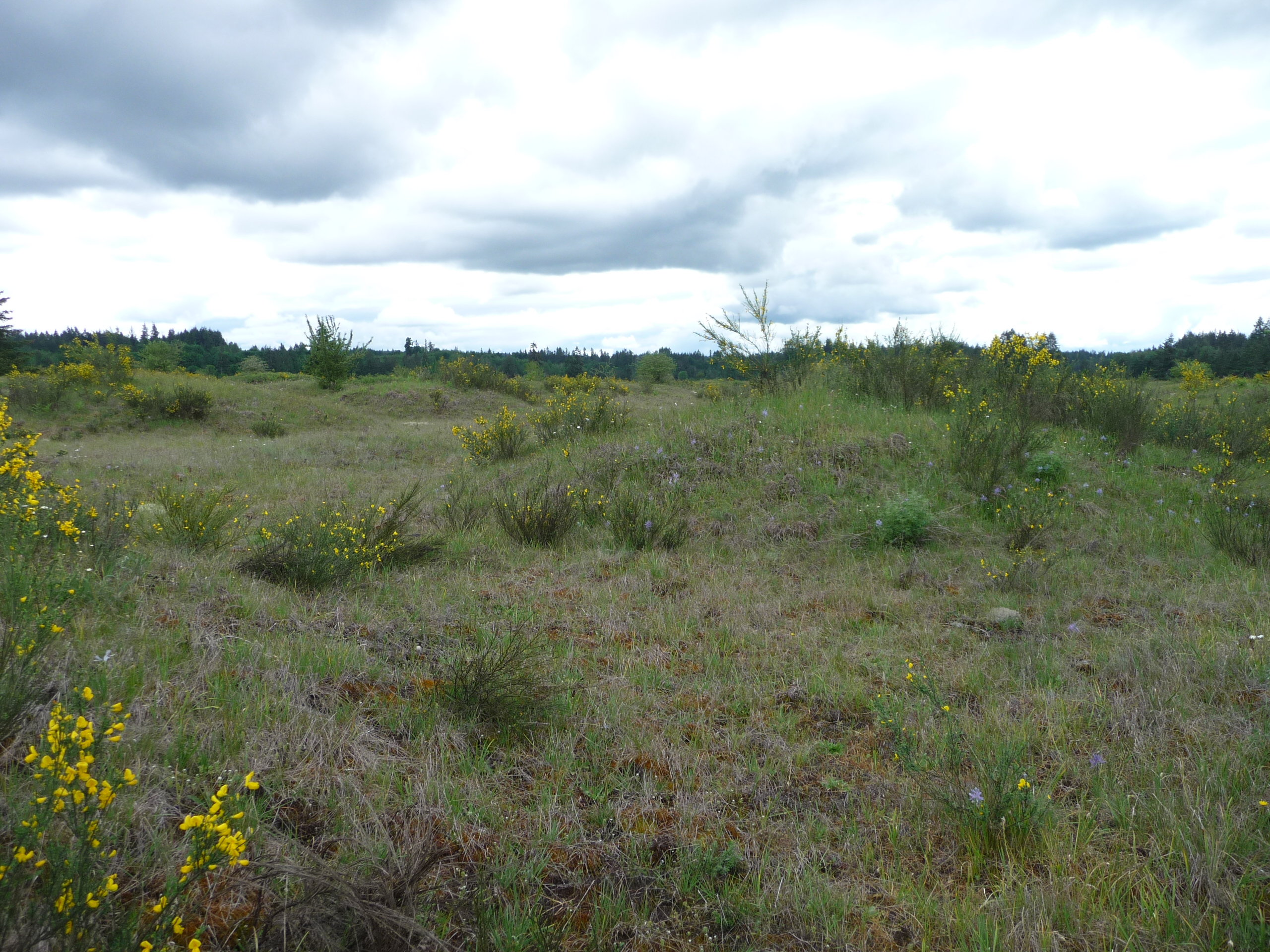
Mima mounds at Rocky Prairie

With the arrival of European settlers in the mid-1800s, new immigrants introduced plant species from where they came from so they could feel more at home. Many of these plants reproduced quickly, took over, and began replacing native species. A very problematic species on prairie lands in Thurston County is Cytisus scoparius (Scotch broom). Non-native grasses have also been a problem. Most of the grass on the prairies is non-native.

Thurston County has seen explosive growth since the 1970s, and the trend is expected to continue for the foreseeable future. Between 1970 and 2010, the population density of Thurston County grew from just 41.1 persons/km^{2} (106.5 persons/mi^{2}) to 134.9 persons/km^{2} (349.4 persons/mi^{2}). The average rate of growth during those years was 2.3 person/km^{2} (6.1 persons/mi^{2}) per year, which is 4.3 times the global average on land.

The explosive growth is causing prairie and other natural lands to quickly shrink.

=== Proposed development ===
The Port of Tacoma owns a property on West Rocky Prairie that borders on the West Rocky Prairie Unit (the state owned property). The size of the property is 746.56 acres (302.12 hectares).

On July 17, 2006, the Port of Olympia and the Port of Tacoma made an agreement to build a railway logistics center. The next day, the Port of Tacoma purchased the property at Rocky Prairie from Citifor, Inc. for a price of over US$21 million (about $70,000 per hectare or $28,000 per acre). Later that year, local groups got together to block the proposal.

In 2008, there were several meetings with the public in which the Thurston County commissioners and representatives from the ports were present. Many citizens had the opportunity to speak in front of the public and voice their opinion about the proposal. Almost everyone that spoke was opposed to the proposal. On June 30, 2008, the Port of Tacoma and the Port of Olympia dropped the proposal to put in the logistics center.

The Port of Tacoma decided to sell the property. In April 2010, a developer from southern California made a down payment on the property. They formed a company called Maytown Sand and Gravel, LLC. After about a year, the property went back to the Port of Tacoma. The company had defaulted on their loan.

In 2019, the Port of Tacoma is selling the property to NorthPoint Development, LLC, a development company centered in Riverside, Missouri for a price of $24 million (about $79,000 per hectare or $32,000 per acre). The company is trying to get Thurston County to change the zoning of the property to industrial.

The current proposal is to have a logistics center on West Rocky Prairie. There would be six million square feet of warehouses (which is about 56 hectares or 138 acres). There would be a massive increase in truck and freight train traffic, and numerous negative secondary environmental impacts.

== Units ==
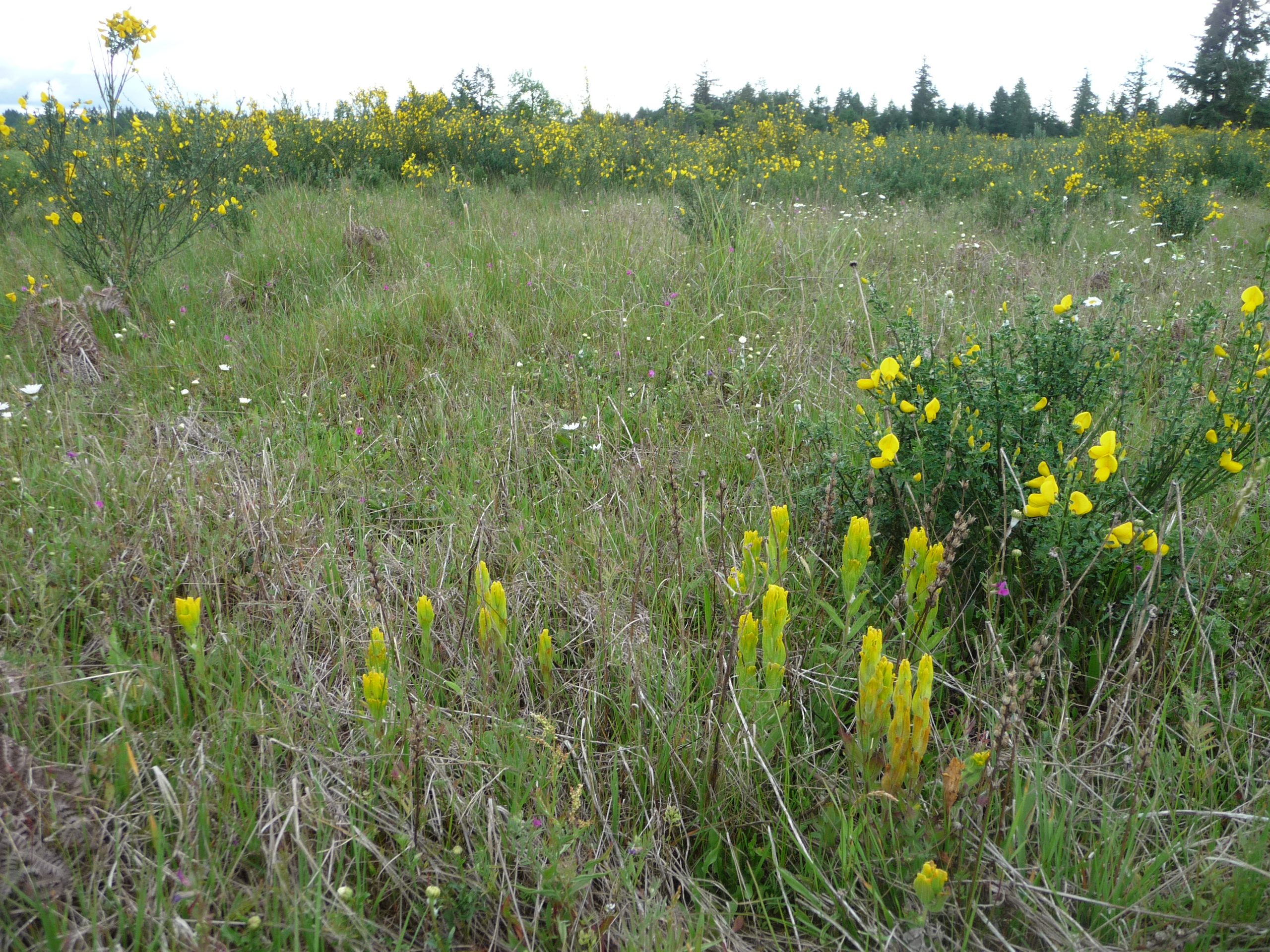
Photo of Castilleja levisecta (golden paintbrush) at Rocky Prairie.

Rocky Prairie is divided into several different properties. The two land owners west of Old Highway 99 are the Washington State Department of Fish and Wildlife and the Port of Tacoma. A major land owner east of Old Highway 99 is the Washington State Department of Natural Resources. There is also another property on the east side owned by Thurston County which has a gravel pit located on it. Some of the prairie on the east side is private property, and has pastures and houses on it.

In West Rocky Prairie, the property that belongs to the Washington State Department of Fish and Wildlife is called the West Rocky Prairie Wildlife Area. The size of the property is 810 acres (330 hectares). Part of the property is wooded, and part of it is in the prairie. The West Rocky Prairie Unit has over 300 acres (120 hectares) of woods, 360 acres (150 hectares) of wetlands, 40 acres (16 hectares) of Quercus garryana (Garry oak trees), and 300 acres (120 hectares) of Mima mounds.

== Climate ==
The closest weather station to Rocky Prairie with a long period of record collection is at the Olympia Regional Airport in the city of Tumwater. Under the Köppen climate classification system, the climate of the Olympia area is classified as Csb. The C means that it is a temperate climate, meaning that the winters are chilly to mild. The s means that it is a Mediterranean climate, meaning that the summers are dry. The b means that the summers are warm but not hot. This type of climate is also called a warm-summer Mediterranean climate. In this type of climate, the winters are rainy. The area south of Olympia is in hardiness zone 8A.

Climate data for the Olympia Regional Airport (metric units); Averages are for the most recent 50-year period as of 2019, 1969-2018
	Jan	Feb	Mar	Apr	May	Jun	Jul	Aug	Sep	Oct	Nov	Dec	Year
Average high °C	7.4	9.6	12.2	15.0	18.8	21.7	25.2	25.4	22.1	15.9	10.2	7.0	15.9
Average mean °C	3.8	4.9	6.8	8.8	12.2	15.0	17.6	17.7	14.8	10.1	6.1	3.5	10.1
Average low °C	0.1	0.2	1.3	2.7	5.6	8.3	10.0	10.0	7.5	4.3	2.0	0.1	4.4
Precipitation (cm)	19.51	13.79	13.80	8.98	5.75	4.07	1.57	2.75	5.54	11.82	21.37	19.39	128.34
Source for data to create chart: NOAA - National Centers for Environmental Information

Climate data for the Olympia Regional Airport (standard units); Averages are for the most recent 50-year period as of 2019, 1969-2018
	Jan	Feb	Mar	Apr	May	Jun	Jul	Aug	Sep	Oct	Nov	Dec	Year
Average high °F	45.3	49.3	54.0	59.0	65.9	71.0	77.3	77.8	71.8	60.5	50.4	44.6	60.6
Average mean °F	38.8	40.8	44.2	47.9	54.0	59.0	63.7	63.9	58.7	50.2	43.0	38.4	50.2
Average low °F	32.2	32.4	34.4	36.8	42.0	47.0	50.0	50.0	45.6	39.8	35.5	32.1	39.9
Precipitation (inches)	7.68	5.43	5.43	3.54	2.26	1.60	0.62	1.08	2.18	4.66	8.41	7.63	50.53
Source for data to create chart: NOAA - National Centers for Environmental Information

== Plant species ==
Rocky Prairie plant species (Click "show" to display table)
Division	Class	Order	Family	Genus and species	Common name(s)
Pinophyta	Pinopsida	Pinales	Pinaceae	Pseudotsuga menziesii var. menziesii English translation: False hemlock spruce - Archibald Menzies - variety	Coast Douglas-fir; Pacific Douglas-fir
		Apiales	Apiaceae	Lomatium triternatum English translation: Small border - three leaves	Nineleaf biscuitroot
		Apiales	Apiaceae	Lomatium utriculatum English translation: Small border - inflated	Common lomatium Spring gold
		Asparagales	Asparagaceae	Camassia quamash English translation: Sweet - sweet	Camas; Common camas Common camash Small camas Quamash
		Asparagales	Iridaceae	Sisyrinchium angustifolium English translation: Pig snout - narrow leaf	Narrow-leaf blue-eyed-grass
		Asterales	Asteraceae	Achillea millefolium English translation: Achilles - thousand leaves	Common yarrow Yarrow
		Asterales	Asteraceae	Antennaria microphylla English translation: Antenna - small leaf	Dwarf everlasting Littleleaf pussytoes Pink pussytoes Rosy pussytoes Small pussytoes
		Asterales	Asteraceae	Balsamorhiza deltoidea English translation: Balsam root - triangle shaped	Deltoid balsamroot
		Asterales	Asteraceae	Solidago canadensis English translation: Heal (to make well) - Canadian	Canada goldenrod Canadian goldenrod
		Asterales	Asteraceae	Solidago spathulata English translation: Heal (to make well) - small spathe	Coast goldenrod Dune goldenrod
		Asterales	Campanulaceae	Campanula rotundifolia English translation: Little bell - round leaf	Harebell
		Asterales	Campanulaceae	Howellia aquatilis	Water howellia
		Asterales	Asteraceae	Erigeron speciosus English translation: Early old man - spectacular	Aspen fleabane Garden fleabane Showy fleabane
		Asterales	Asteraceae	Eriophyllum lanatum English translation: Woolly leaf - woolly	Common woolly sunflower Oregon sunshine
		Asterales	Asteraceae	Microseris laciniata English translation: Small lettuce like plant - narrow lobes	Cutleaf silverpuffs Cut leaf microseris
		Asterales	Asteraceae	Sericocarpus rigidus	Columbian whitetop aster
		Asterales	Asteraceae	Hieracium albertinum	Houndstongue hawkweed Western hawkweed
		Caryophyllales	Caryophyllaceae	Cerastium arvense English translation: Horn - farmland	Field chickweed
		Dipsacales	Caprifoliaceae	Symphoricarpos albus English translation: Fruit clusters - white	Common snowberry
		Ericales	Ericaceae	Arctostaphylos uva-ursi English translation: Bear, bunch of grapes - bear's grape	Kinnikinnick; Pinemat manzanita
		Ericales	Primulaceae	Dodecatheon hendersonii English translation: Twelve gods - Louis Forniquet Henderson	Broad-leaved shooting star Henderson's shooting star Mosquito bills Sailor caps
		Fabales	Fabaceae	Lupinus albicaulis English translation: Wolf - white stems	Sicklekeel lupine
		Fabales	Fabaceae	Lupinus lepidus English translation: Wolf - elegant	Dwarf lupine Pacific lupine Prairie lupine
		Fagales	Fagaceae	Quercus garryana English translation: Oak - Nicholas Garry	Garry oak Oregon oak Oregon white oak
		Lamiales	Lamiaceae	Prunella vulgaris English translation: Quinsey - common	Blue curls Brownwort; Carpenter's herb Common self-heal Heal-all; Heart-of-the-earth; Woundwort
		Lamiales	Orobanchaceae	Castilleja levisecta	Golden Indian paintbrush Golden paintbrush
		Liliales	Melanthiaceae	Toxicoscordion venenosum English translation: Toxic garlic - venomous	Death camas Meadow death camas
		Liliales	Liliaceae	Fritillaria affinis English translation: Dice box - similar	Checker lily Chocolate lily
		Malpighiales	Violaceae	Viola adunca English translation: Violet - hooked	Early blue violet Hookedspur violet Sand violet Western dog violet
		Poales	Juncaceae	Luzula campestris English translation: Lucciola - plains	Field wood-rush Good Friday grass Sweep's brush
		Poales	Poaceae	Festuca idahoensis English translation: Straw - Idaho	Blue hunchgrass Idaho fescue
		Poales	Poaceae	Danthonia californica English translation: Étienne Danthoine - California	California oatgrass
		Ranunculales	Ranunculaceae	Aquilegia formosa English translation: Eagles' claw - beautiful	Crimson columbine Red columbine Western columbine
		Ranunculales	Ranunculaceae	Delphinium nuttallii English translation: Dolphin - Thomas Nuttall	Nuttall's larkspur
		Ranunculales	Ranunculaceae	Ranunculus occidentalis English translation: Little frog - western	Western buttercup
		Rosales	Rosaceae	Malus fusca English translation: Apple - dusky	Oregon crabapple Pacific crabapple
		Rosales	Rosaceae	Potentilla gracilis English translation: Potent, small - graceful	Graceful cinquefoil Slender cinquefoil
		Rosales	Rosaceae	Rosa pisocarpa English translation: Rose - pea-like fruit	Cluster rose Swamp rose
Photographs shown were not necessarily taken at Rocky Prairie, and most likely were not taken there. Photographs of similar types of plants may be substituted if that species/subspecies photo is not available.

== Animal species ==
Rocky Prairie animal species (Click "show" to display table)
Phylum	Class	Order	Family	Genus and species	Common name(s)
Arthropoda	Insecta	Hymenoptera	Apidae	Bombus californicus	California bumble bee
Arthropoda	Insecta	Lepidoptera	Hesperiidae	Euphyes propertius	Propertius duskywing
Arthropoda	Insecta	Lepidoptera	Hesperiidae	Euphyes vestris	Dun sedge skipper Dun skipper Sedge witch
Arthropoda	Insecta	Lepidoptera	Hesperiidae	Hesperia comma	Common branded skipper Holarctic grass skipper
Arthropoda	Insecta	Lepidoptera	Hesperiidae	Hesperia juba	Jagged-border skipper Juba skipper Yuba skipper
Arthropoda	Insecta	Lepidoptera	Hesperiidae	Ochlodes sylvanoides ssp. orecoastus	Coastal woodland skipper
Arthropoda	Insecta	Lepidoptera	Hesperiidae	Polites mardon	Mardon skipper
Arthropoda	Insecta	Lepidoptera	Hesperiidae	Polites sonora	Sonoran skipper Western long dash
Arthropoda	Insecta	Lepidoptera	Lycaenidae	Icaricia icarioides ssp. blackmorei	Puget blue
Arthropoda	Insecta	Lepidoptera	Nymphalidae	Euphydryas editha ssp. taylori	Taylor's checkerspot Whulge checkerspot
Arthropoda	Insecta	Lepidoptera	Nymphalidae	Speyeria zerene ssp. bremnerii	Valley silverspot
Chordata	Amphibia	Anura	Ranidae	Rana pretiosa	Oregon spotted frog
Chordata	Aves	Anseriformes	Anatidae	Branta canadensis	Canada goose
Chordata	Aves	Accipitriformes	Accipitridae	Haliaeetus leucocephalus	Bald eagle
Chordata	Aves	Passeriformes	Turdidae	Turdus migratorius	American robin
Chordata	Mammalia	Artiodactyla	Cervidae	Odocoileus hemionus ssp. columbianus	Columbian black-tailed deer
Chordata	Mammalia	Rodentia	Geomyidae	Thomomys mazama ssp. tumuli	Tenino pocket gopher
Chordata	Mammalia	Rodentia	Sciuridae	Tamiasciurus douglasii	Douglas squirrel
Photographs shown in animal species chart were not necessarily taken at Rocky Prairie, and most likely were not taken there. Photographs of similar types of animals may be substituted if that species/subspecies photo is not available.

== See also ==
- List of geographic features in Thurston County, Washington
- Scatter Creek Wildlife Area
