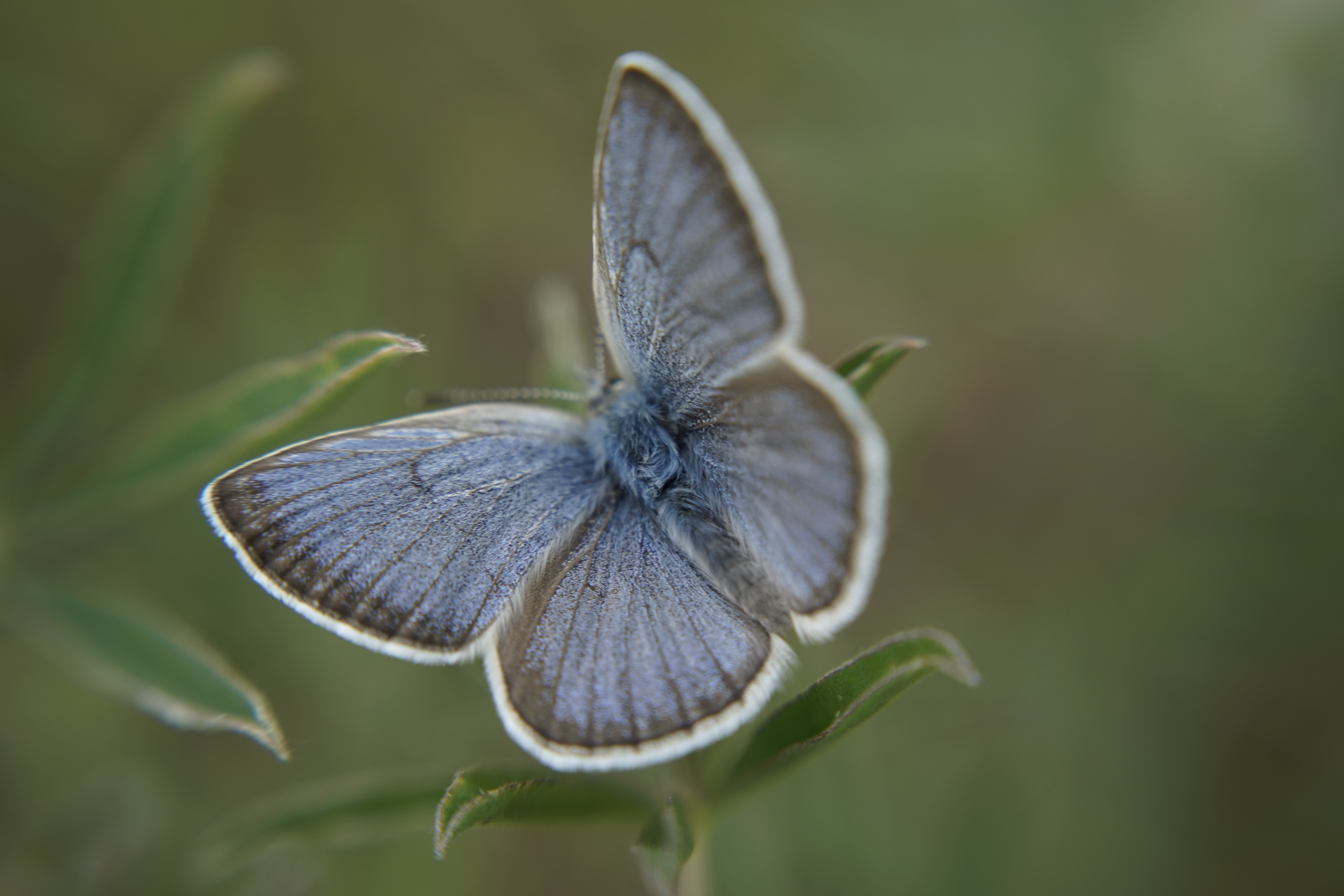
- Puget blue male

Scientific classification
- Domain: Eukaryota
- Kingdom: Animalia
- Phylum: Arthropoda
- Class: Insecta
- Order: Lepidoptera
- Family: Lycaenidae
- Genus: Icaricia
- Species: I. icarioides
- Subspecies: I. i. blackmorei

Trinomial name
- Icaricia icarioides blackmorei (Barnes & McDunnough, 1919)

= Icaricia icarioides blackmorei =

Subspecies of butterfly

Icaricia icarioides blackmorei, the Puget blue, is a butterfly native to the Puget Sound area in the northwestern U.S. state of Washington. It is a subspecies of Boisduval's blue (Icaricia icarioides).

== Description ==
The Puget blue is a small blue and grey butterfly with a wingspan of around 1.8 inches (4.6 cm) in the family Lycaenidae. The male has dorsal wings that are a silvery blue with a wide dark margin. The female is grey brown with diffuse blue patches at the base of the wings, with chocolate brown inner wings. The range of this subspecies spans from Vancouver Island and the Olympic Mountains in alpine to subalpine habitat to the lowland prairies of the South Puget Sound.

== Conservation status ==
At this time, the Puget blue has not yet been designated endangered or threatened by the federal government, but it is a candidate subspecies for restoration in the state of Washington. Populations in the prairies have declined due to the loss of prairies as well as the encroachment of woody vegetation such as Douglas-fir (Pseudotsuga menziesii) and Scotch broom (Cytisus scoparius).

== Threats ==
Scotch broom out-competes the host plants of this butterfly subspecies and as a nitrogen fixer it alters the natural nutrient balance in the soils. Because many prairie species, such as their host plant, the lupine (Lupinus lepidus and Lupinus albicaulis), have adapted to thrive on much lower nutrient levels the increased nutrient loading greatly inhibits the lupines ability to thrive. The subalpine populations have increased as logging activities have cleared land allowing the expansion of the lupine. The biggest threat to the subalpine populations is climate change, while the prairie populations are most threatened by habitat loss and fragmentation. Land management techniques used to maintain prairies such as controlled burns, can either help or hurt populations of native butterflies. If timed correctly controlled burns can greatly increase that year's lupine crop, giving the Puget blue a better chance of success.
