= Puget prairie =

Endangered prairie in Washington

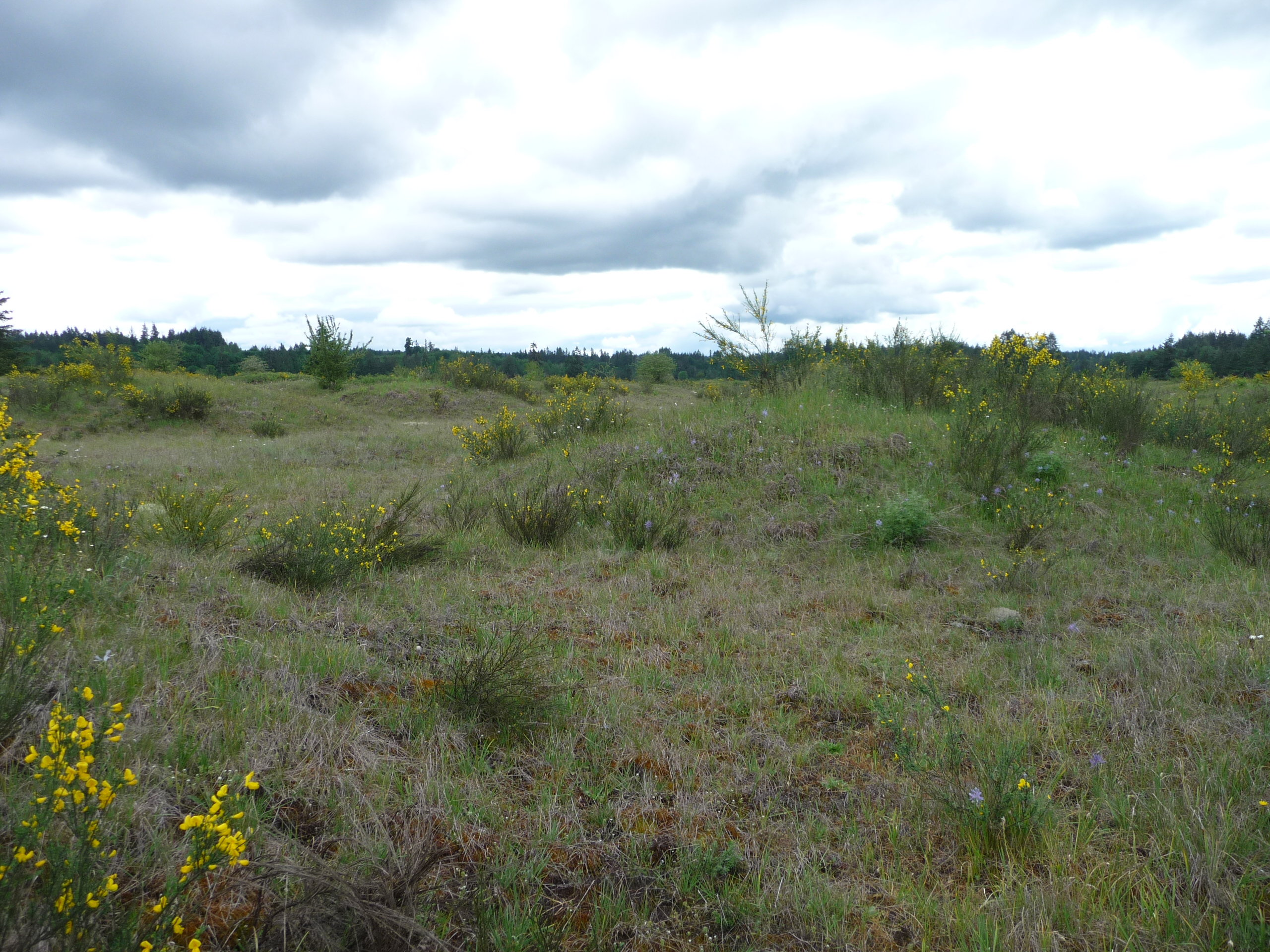
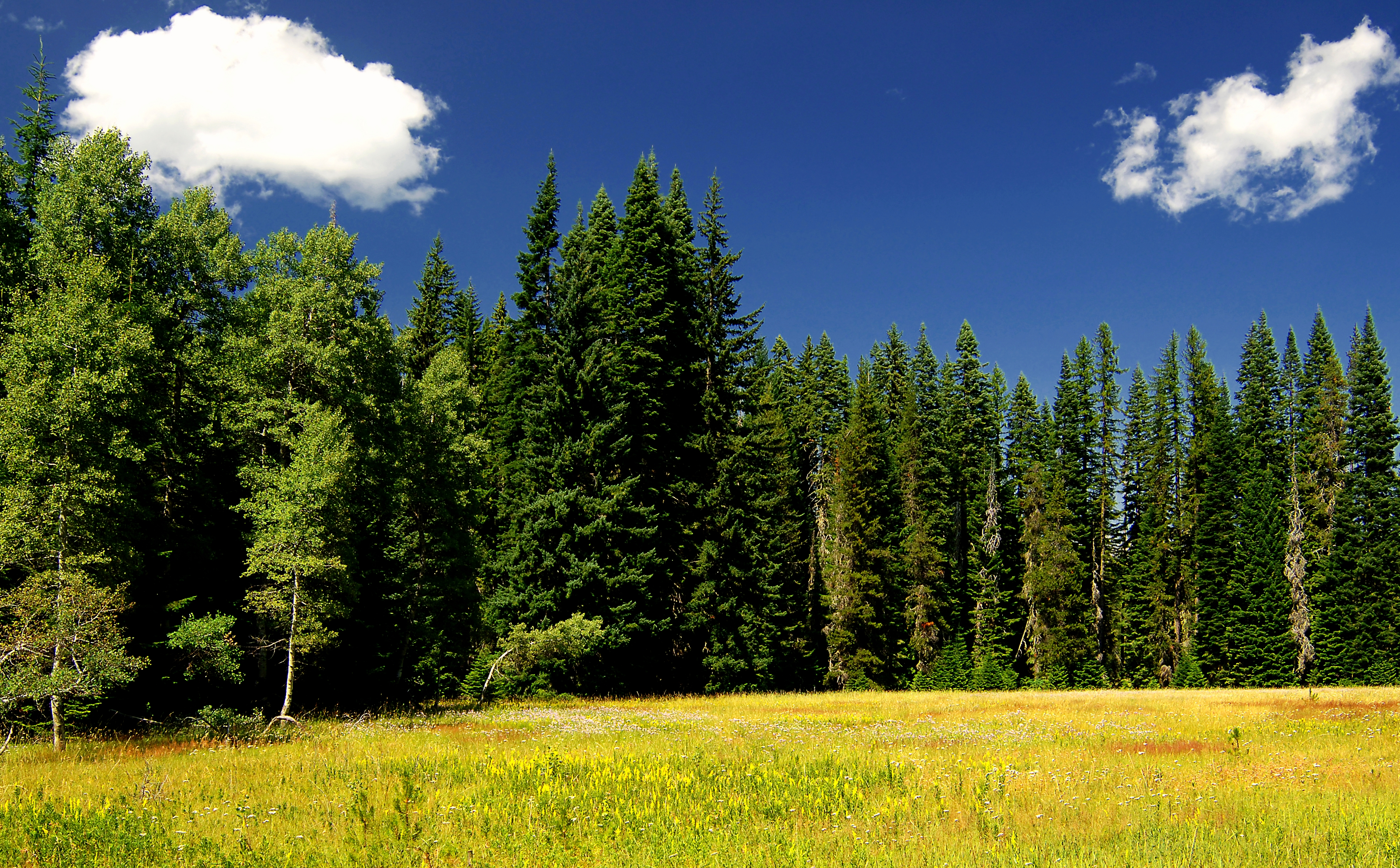
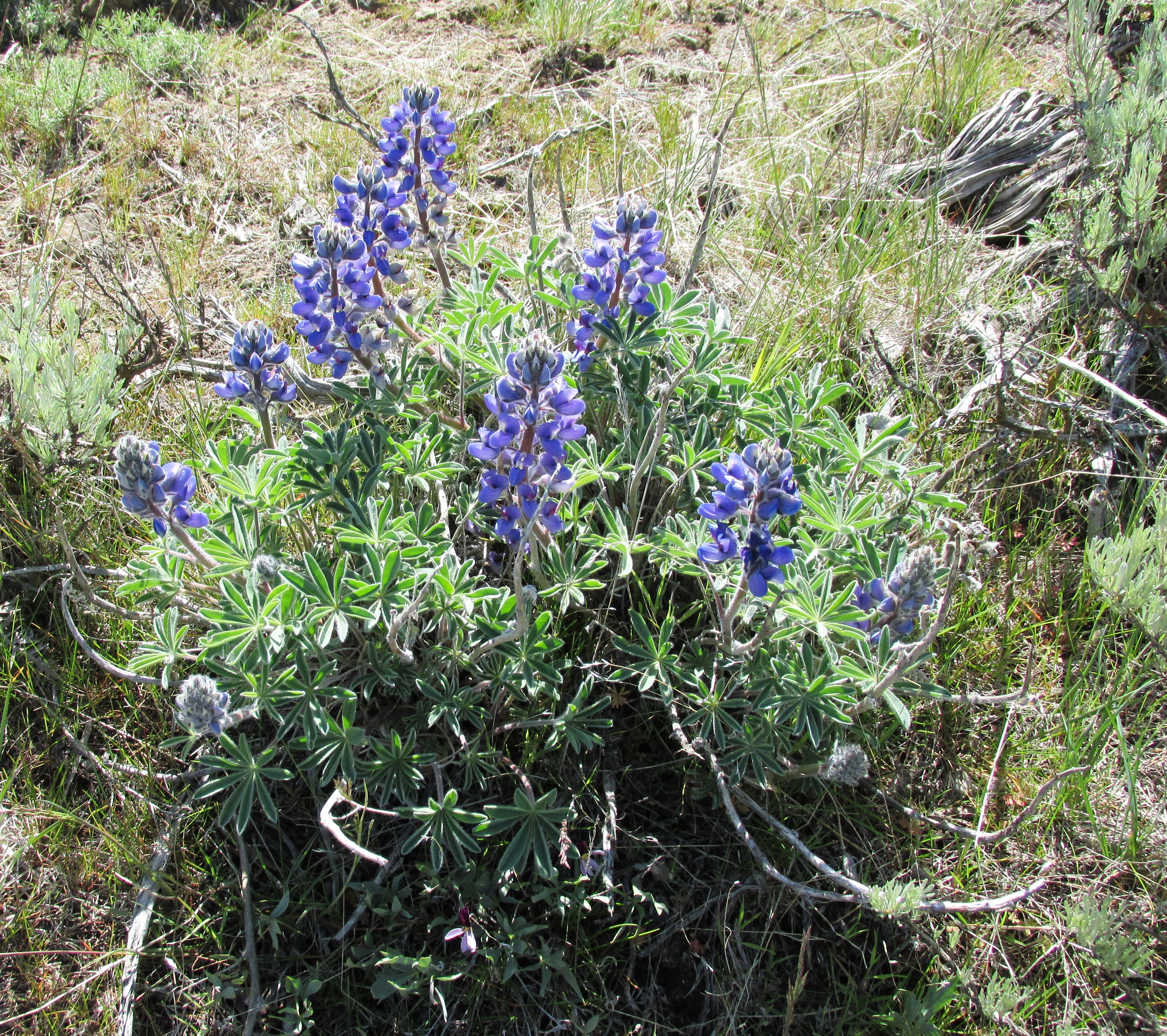

Puget prairie, also known as South Sound prairie or South Puget Sound prairie, is an endangered type of prairie found along the southern coast of the Puget Sound in northwestern Washington, in the United States. It is home to many endemic species, and is threatened greatly, with under 10% of the native prairie remaining. The prairie was formed due to receding glaciers from the last ice age, which left behind large areas of drained and gravelly soil. Puget prairie once covered almost 150,000 acres of modern Washington, but due to suppression of natural and controlled fires, encroachment of non-native plants, and human development, it receded to its modern size, far smaller than its pre-contact range.

== Formation ==
The Puget prairie formed due to the receding of the Vashon glacier roughly 11,000 years ago, which revealed the soil beneath the ice that had sat for thousands of years. This soil was gravelly and incredibly well-drained, creating conditions ideal for prairie formation.

== Loss and preservation of native prairie ==
Puget prairie is relatively flat and covered with cultivable soil, making it ideal for human settlement. Before European contact and mass development of the area, the expansion of forest would be held back by fire, including natural fires that were uncontained, and controlled fires triggered by the Indigenous peoples of the area. These fires would also hold back Douglas fir. After contact, these lands would begin to be cultivated and settled, introducing many non-native plants and species to the ecosystem. Because of the increased human presence, and lack of understanding of the relationship between fire and prairie preservation, the fires that had kept the loss of prairie in check began to be suppressed, further extending the loss of Puget prairie.

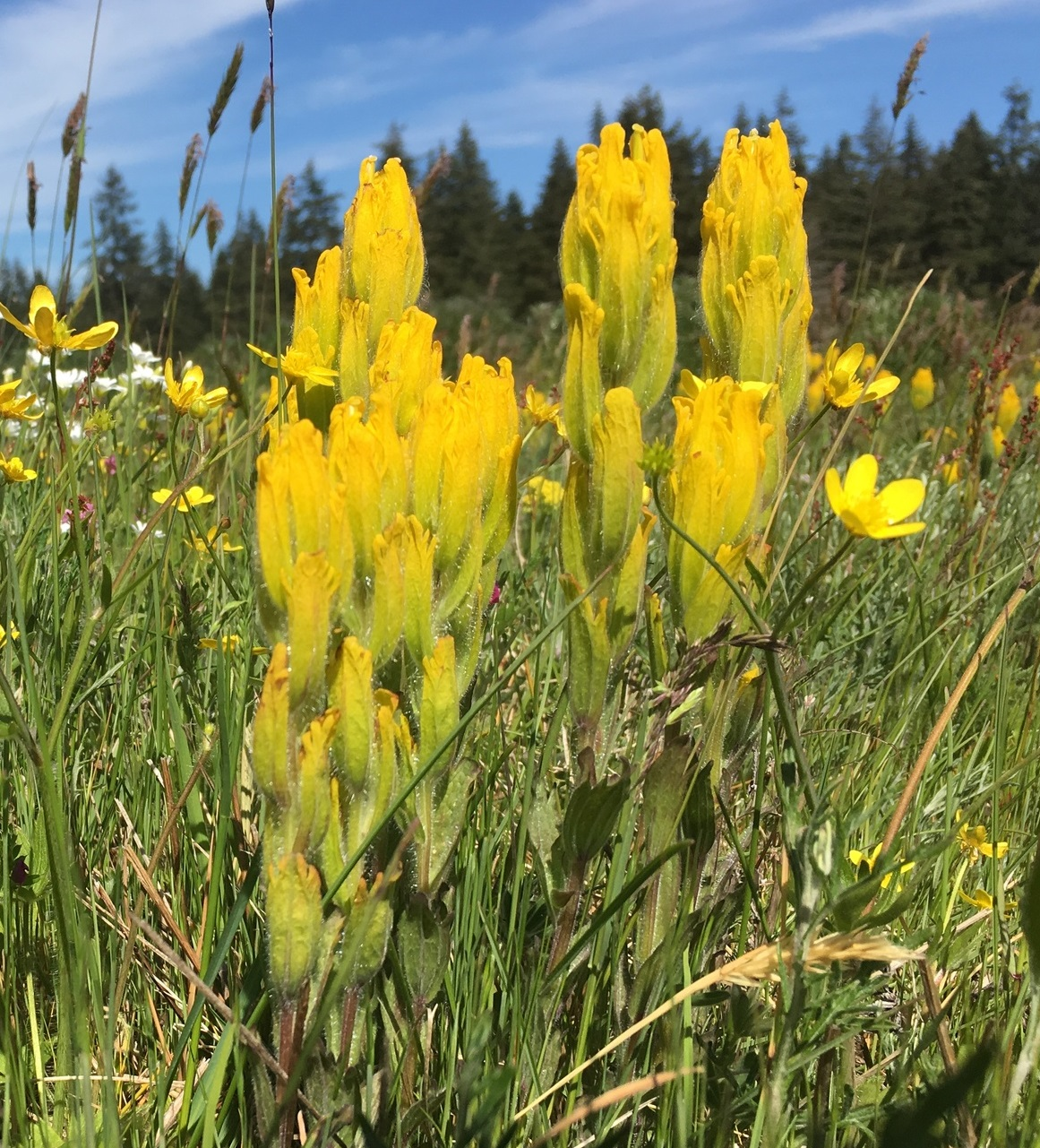
Golden Paintbrush

As of 2013, on the 149,360 acres of land marked as "grassland soils", native Puget prairie occurred on 12,582 acres, and native species dominated 2,993 acres. This means that only 8% of the prairie area was still definitively native Puget prairie, and just 3% of the total soils were still populated mainly by native plant species. There have been many conservation efforts to preserve the prairie; an example is Rocky Prairie, a Natural Area Preserve southwest of Seattle that protects Golden Paintbrush (Castilleja levisecta), a threatened plant native to the Puget prairie. These efforts have resulted in local restoration of many native plants and biomes, leading to results such as the aforementioned Golden Paintbrush being considered for delisting from endangerment by the U.S. Fish & Wildlife Service.
