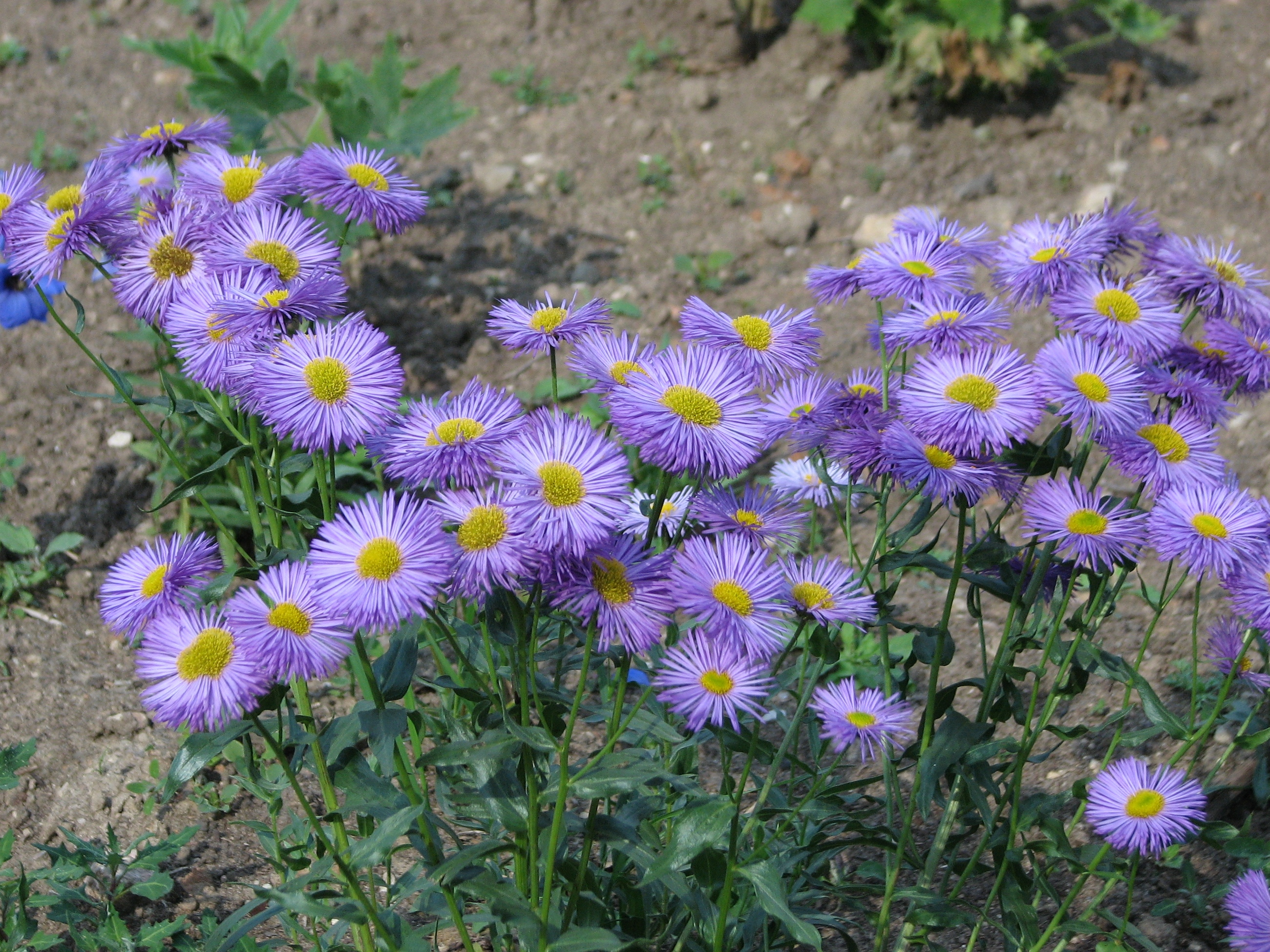
- Main Botanical Garden, Academy of Sciences, Moscow, Russia

Conservation status
- Secure (NatureServe)

Scientific classification
- Kingdom: Plantae
- Clade: Tracheophytes
- Clade: Angiosperms
- Clade: Eudicots
- Clade: Asterids
- Order: Asterales
- Family: Asteraceae
- Genus: Erigeron
- Species: E. speciosus

Binomial name
- Erigeron speciosus Eastw.

Synonyms
- Synonymy: Erigeron conspicuus Rydb.; Erigeron eucephaloides Greene; Erigeron grandiflorus Nutt. October 1834 not Hook. September 1834; Erigeron leiophyllus Greene; Erigeron leucotrichus Rydb.; Erigeron macranthus Nutt.; Erigeron salicinus Rydb.; Erigeron villosulus Greene; Stenactis speciosa Lindl.

= Erigeron speciosus =

Species of flowering plant

Erigeron speciosus is a widespread North American species of flowering plants in the family Asteraceae known by the common names aspen fleabane, garden fleabane, and showy fleabane.

== Description ==
E. speciosus is a perennial herb which grows up to 100 centimetres (39 inches) tall, producing underground rhizomes and a woody caudex. The inflorescence generally contains 2–20 flower heads per stem. Each head contains 75–150 white, lavender or blue ray florets surrounding many yellow disc florets. Flowers bloom from June to October.

The species is similar to E. subtrinervis, the stems and leaves of which are hairy.

== Etymology ==
The specific epithet speciosus means 'pretty'.

== Distribution and habitat ==
The species has been found in western Canada and the United States, from Alberta and British Columbia south as far as Arizona and New Mexico, with some isolated populations in the Mexican state of Baja California. It grows in open coniferous forests.
