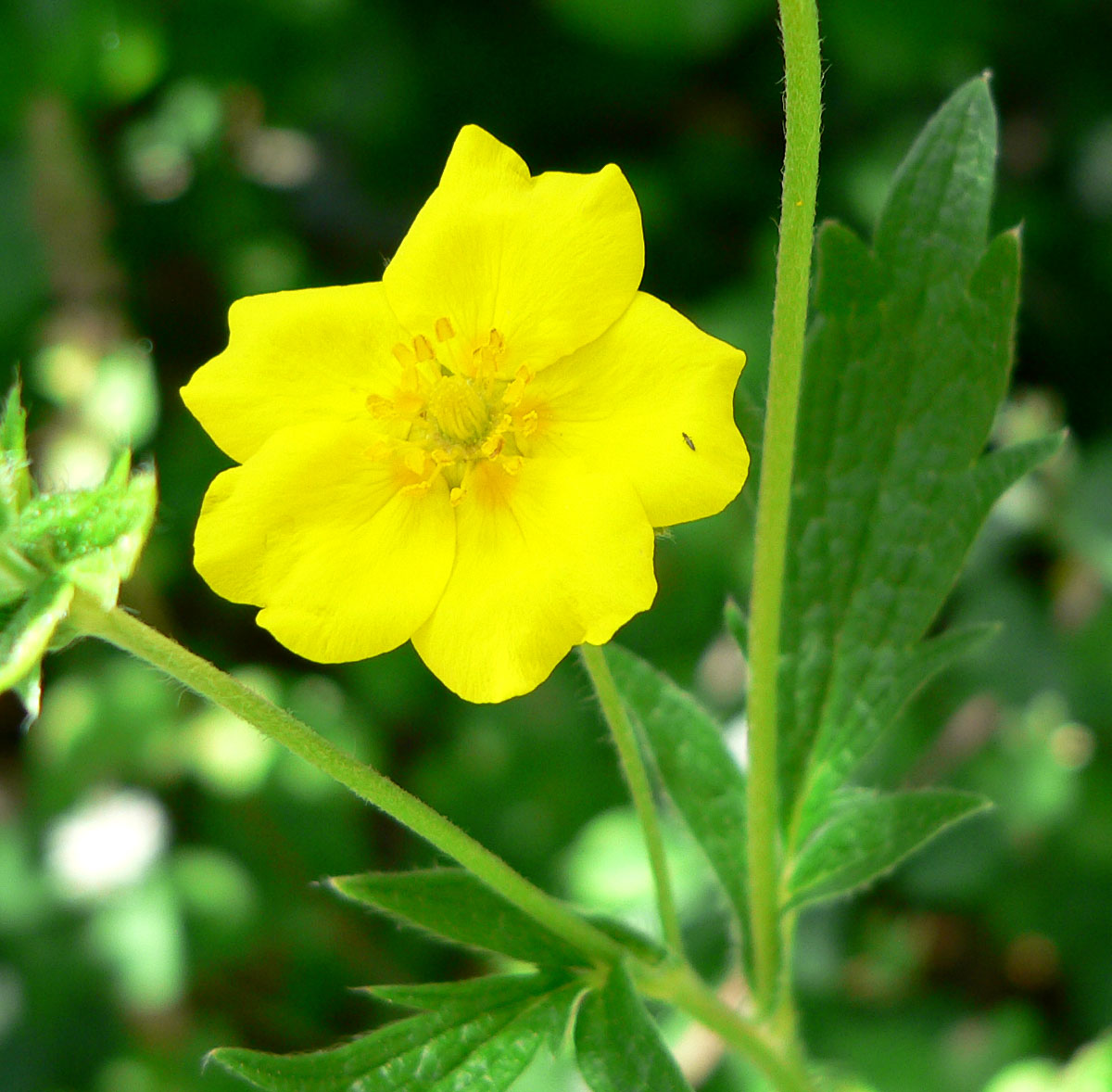

Scientific classification
- Kingdom: Plantae
- Clade: Embryophytes
- Clade: Tracheophytes
- Clade: Spermatophytes
- Clade: Angiosperms
- Clade: Eudicots
- Clade: Rosids
- Order: Rosales
- Family: Rosaceae
- Genus: Potentilla
- Species: P. gracilis

Binomial name
- Potentilla gracilis Douglas ex Hook.

Synonyms
- Potentilla flabelliformis Lehm. Potentilla pectinisecta Rydb.

= Potentilla gracilis =

Species of flowering plant

Potentilla gracilis, known as slender cinquefoil or graceful cinquefoil, is a species of cinquefoil. It ranges from Alaska down the west coast of Canada and the United States, and Colorado.

Named varieties are:

- Potentilla gracilis var. elmeri (Rydb.) Jeps. – combleaf cinquefoil
- Potentilla gracilis var. flabelliformis (Lehm.) Nutt.

This perennial herb is variable in morphology, growing several erect stems up to a meter tall from a branching caudex and rhizome unit. The leaves are palmate and compound, each divided into five to seven wide lance-shaped leaflets with toothed edges. The leaflets are hairy, with many more hairs on the undersides, making them lighter in color than the top surfaces. The basal leaves are borne on very long petioles. Leaves higher on the stem are smaller and reduced. The inflorescence is a cyme of several flowers, each with usually five sepals, lower bracts, and yellow petals.

It is a larval host to the two-banded checkered skipper.
