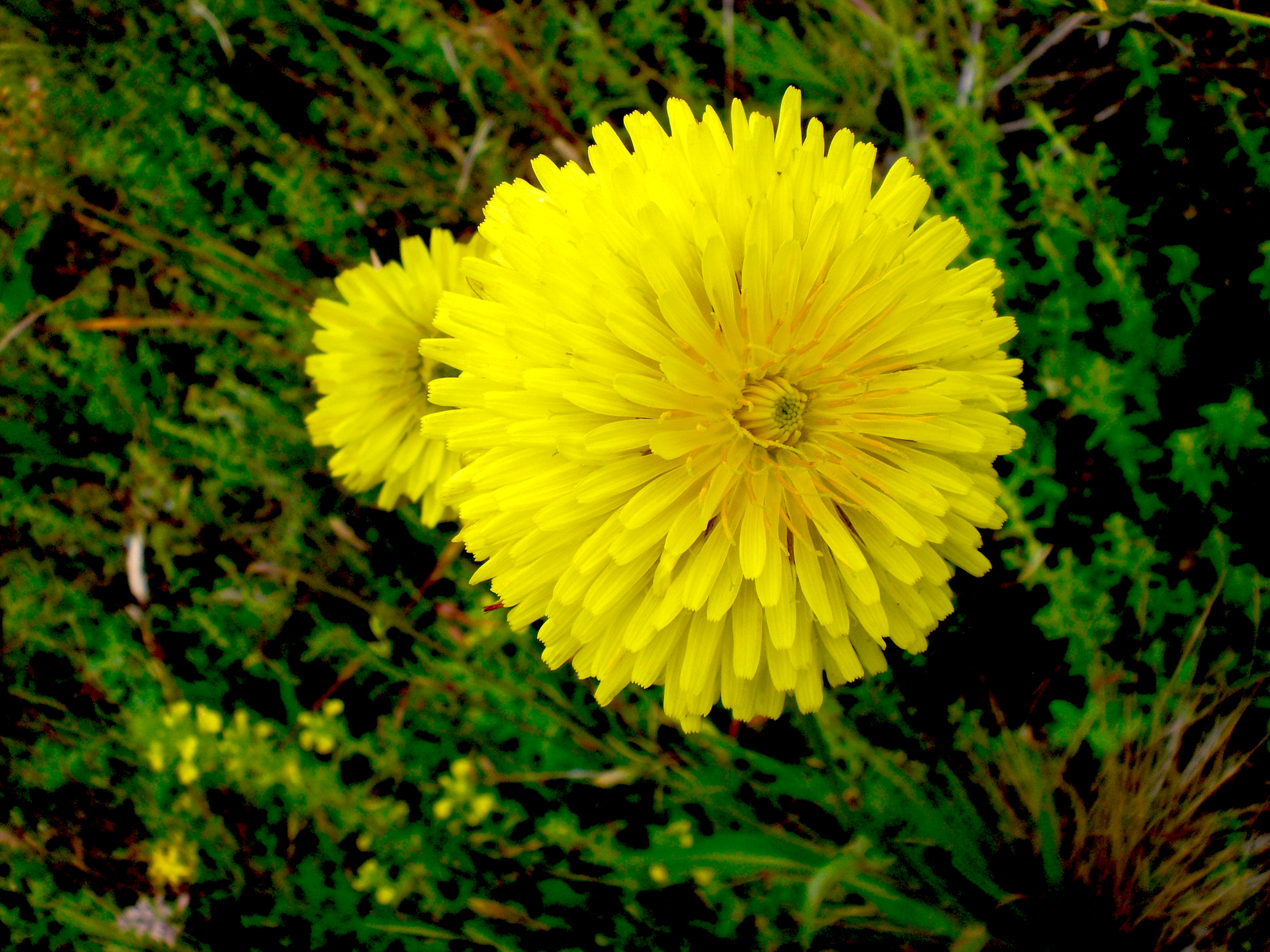

Scientific classification
- Kingdom: Plantae
- Clade: Tracheophytes
- Clade: Angiosperms
- Clade: Eudicots
- Clade: Asterids
- Order: Asterales
- Family: Asteraceae
- Genus: Microseris
- Species: M. laciniata

Binomial name
- Microseris laciniata (Hook.) Sch.Bip.

= Microseris laciniata =

Species of flowering plant

Microseris laciniata is a species of flowering plant in the family Asteraceae known by the common name cutleaf silverpuffs. It is native to the western United States from Washington to northern California and Nevada, where it grows in forest and grassland habitat.

== Description ==
It is a perennial herb growing up to a meter tall with a branching stem. The plentiful leaves are 10 to 50 centimeters long and variable in shape, with smooth, toothed, or lobed edges. The inflorescence is borne on a tall, erect or curving peduncle. The flower head may be 3 centimeters long when in bud and wide when in bloom, bearing up to 100 or more long yellow ray florets.

The fruit is an achene with a gray or brown body a few millimeters long. At the tip of the body is a large pappus made up of 5 to over 20 long, hairy scales, each of which may exceed one centimeter in length.

There are four Microseris laciniata subspecies.

== Uses ==
The root, though bitter, was used for food by Native Americans of Mendocino. The milky sap was left out in the sun and used as a gum.
