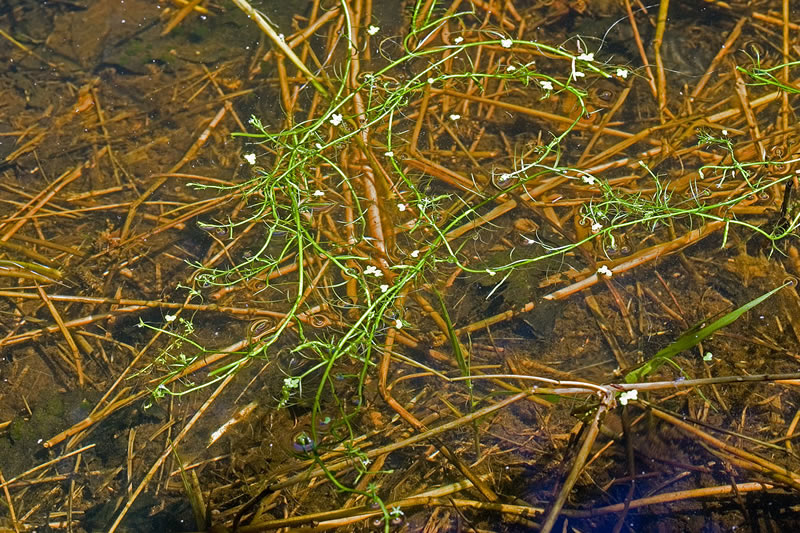

Conservation status
- Vulnerable (NatureServe)

- Delisted (ESA)

Scientific classification
- Kingdom: Plantae
- Clade: Tracheophytes
- Clade: Angiosperms
- Clade: Eudicots
- Clade: Asterids
- Order: Asterales
- Family: Campanulaceae
- Subfamily: Lobelioideae
- Genus: Howellia; A.Gray
- Species: H. aquatilis

Binomial name
- Howellia aquatilis A.Gray

= Howellia =

Genus of flowering plants

Howellia aquatilis, the water howellia, is a small plant in the family Campanulaceae that was considered a federally threatened species between 1994 and 2021 under the Endangered Species Act of 1973. It is the only species in the monotypic genus Howellia. Thomas Jefferson Howell and Joseph Howell discovered the species in 1878.

== Distribution ==
The water howellia is found in large area of the Pacific Northwest region of the United States. It can be found in California, Idaho, Montana, and Washington, and it is known historically from Oregon.

The plant grows in wetland habitat surrounded by forests, which provide organic material. Associated tree species include Populus trichocarpa (California poplar), P. tremuloides (quaking aspen), and Fraxinus latifolia (Oregon ash). The water bodies are located in glacial potholes, river oxbows, ephemeral ponds, flood plains and other areas that fill with water periodically as snow melts and spring rain falls.

== Biology ==
The plant produces two types of flowers. Submerged cleistogamous flowers remain closed and self-pollinate, and flowers that bloom above the surface of the water open into white blossoms and may cross with other individuals. Because it often pollinates itself, the species has a low genetic diversity. Seeds are produced in the water but they require open air for germination, so they sprout when the wetland has dried in the fall.

== Conservation ==
Threats to this species include loss of habitat to logging and draining and conversion to urban use, alteration of the local hydrology by placement of dams and dikes, deposition of silt, livestock activity, introduced species of plants, low genetic diversity, and climate change.
