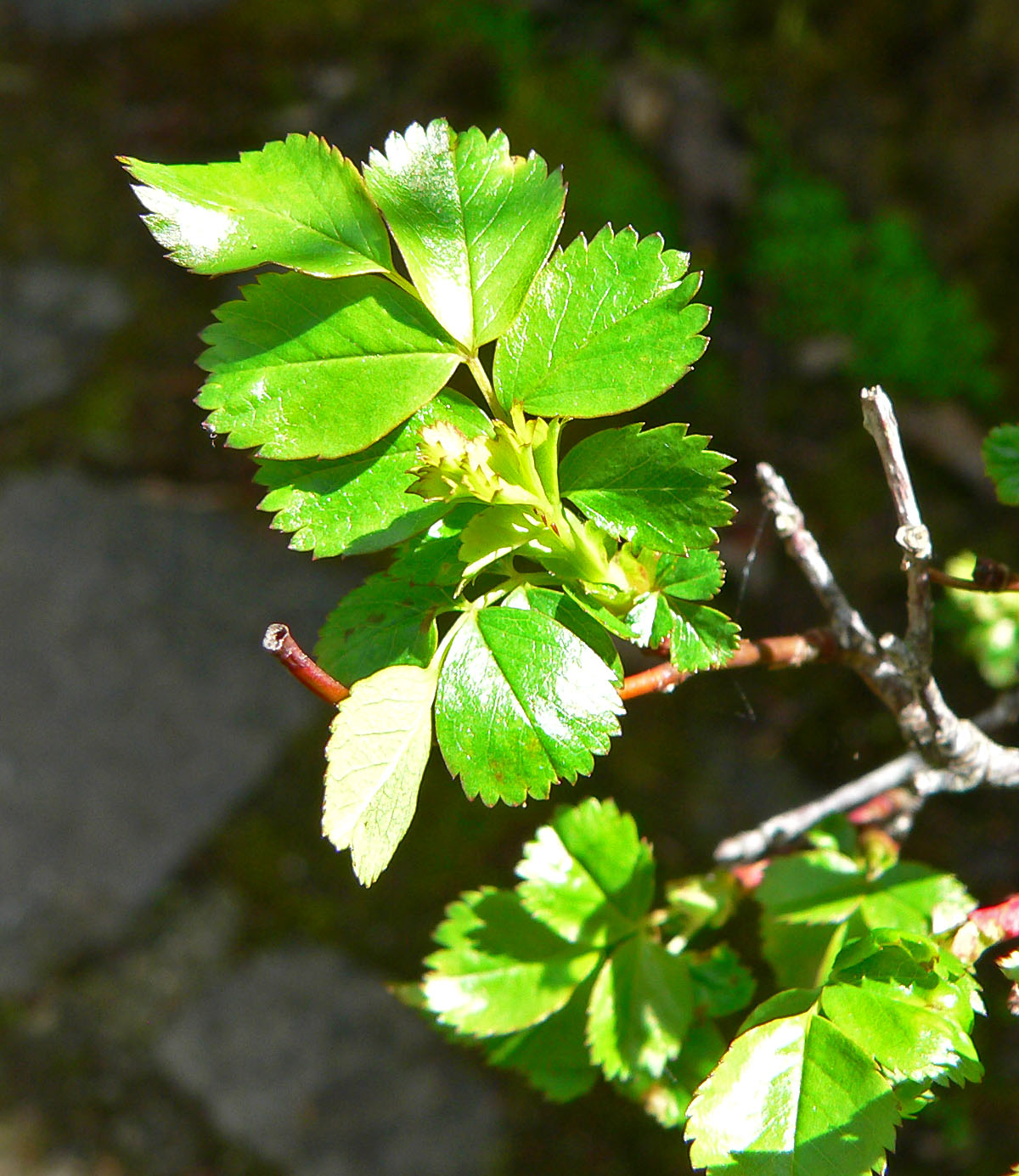

Scientific classification
- Kingdom: Plantae
- Clade: Tracheophytes
- Clade: Angiosperms
- Clade: Eudicots
- Clade: Rosids
- Order: Rosales
- Family: Rosaceae
- Genus: Rosa
- Species: R. pisocarpa

Binomial name
- Rosa pisocarpa A.Gray

= Rosa pisocarpa =

Species of flowering plant

Rosa pisocarpa is a species of rose known by the common name cluster rose or swamp rose. It is native to western North America from British Columbia to northern California, where it generally grows in moist habitats. It is a shrub sometimes forming a thicket, and growing up to 2.5 meters tall. The stems can be dark red or blackish and are often studded with straight, paired prickles at nodes. The leaves are each made up of several toothed oval leaflets, the terminal leaflet up to 4 centimeters long. The inflorescence is a cyme of up to 10 flowers with pink petals each up to 2 centimeters in length. The fruit is a rose hip about a centimeter wide. The hips are pear- or egg-shaped and borne in clusters, and are decorative in fall and early winter, when they are red or reddish-purple and contrast with yellow foliage. Fall foliage can be yellow or dark red.

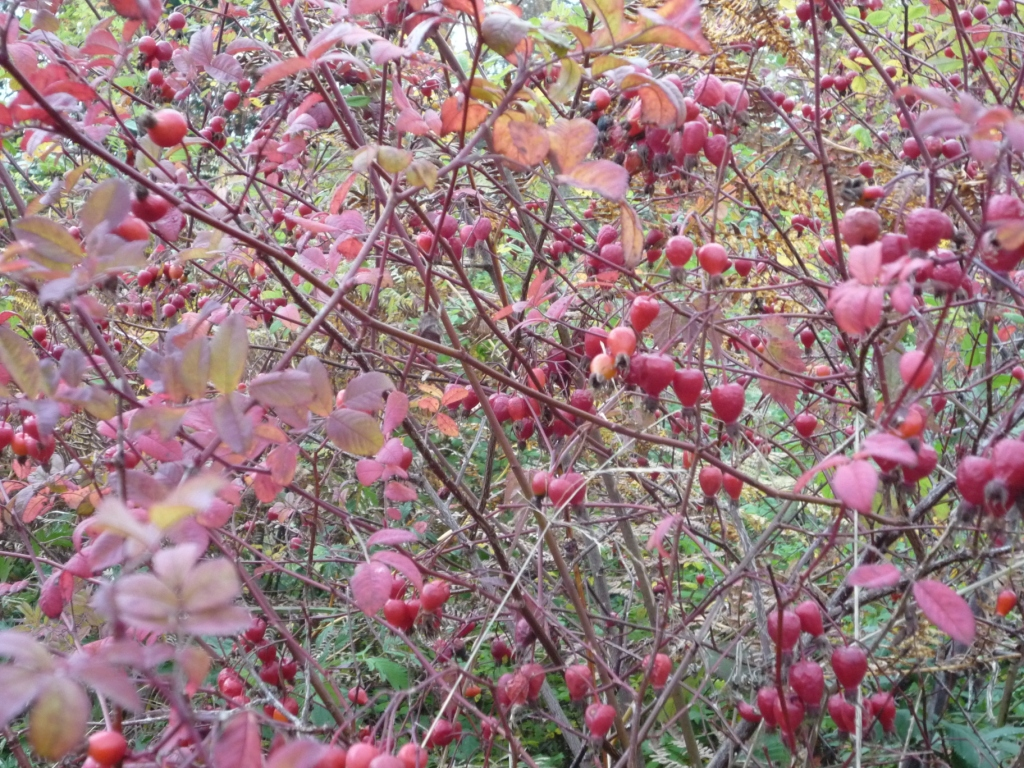
Fall color and hips.

== Ecology ==
Rosa pisocarpa has a wetland indicator status of FAC for the Pacific Northwest (region 9) and FACU for California (region 0). It grows in full sun in the northern and wetter portions of its range, but also tolerates partial shade, and can grow in dry or lean soils.

Rosa pisocarpa grows in riparian areas, along roadside ditches, in powerline right-of-ways, along fencerows and hedgerows, in wetland buffers and woodlands.

Rosa pisocarpa is used in wetland restorations and in native plant landscaping. Its thorny thickets and numerous, persistent hips provide shelter and food for birds and other small wildlife. Deer browse new stems and foliage.

Rosa pisocarpa hosts gall-making wasps of the family Cynipidae, genus Diplolepis, in the insect class Hymenoptera. Two species are D. polita, which makes bristly round red or green galls on leaves, and D. rosae, the mossy rose gall, which makes large, mossy, feathery, greenish or yellowish growths on stems.

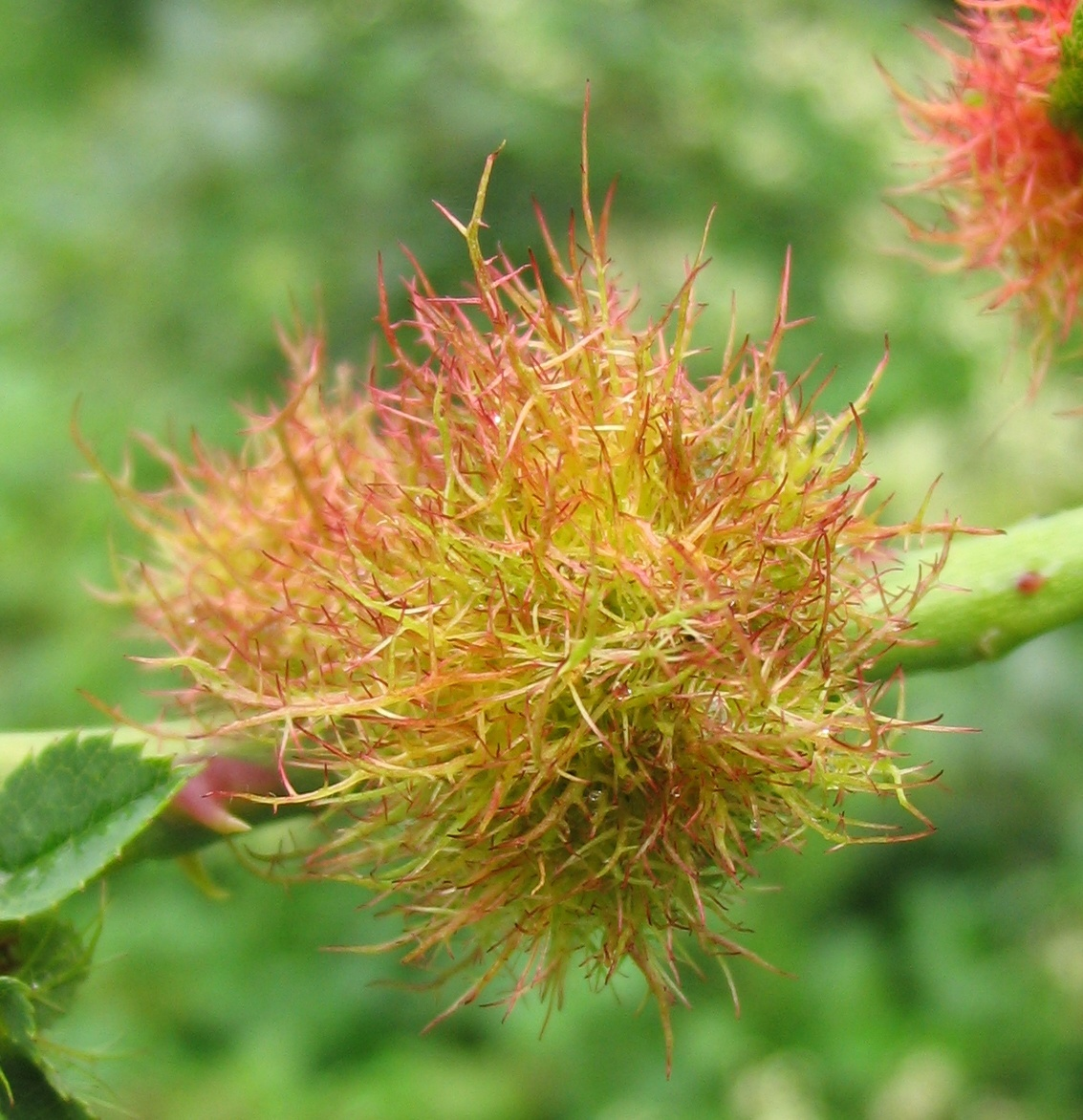
Mossy Rose Gall

== In Culture ==
The Wildrose, the oldest lesbian bar in the United States, is likely to be named after the Clustered Wildrose as it is the most prominent wild rose in cascadia.
