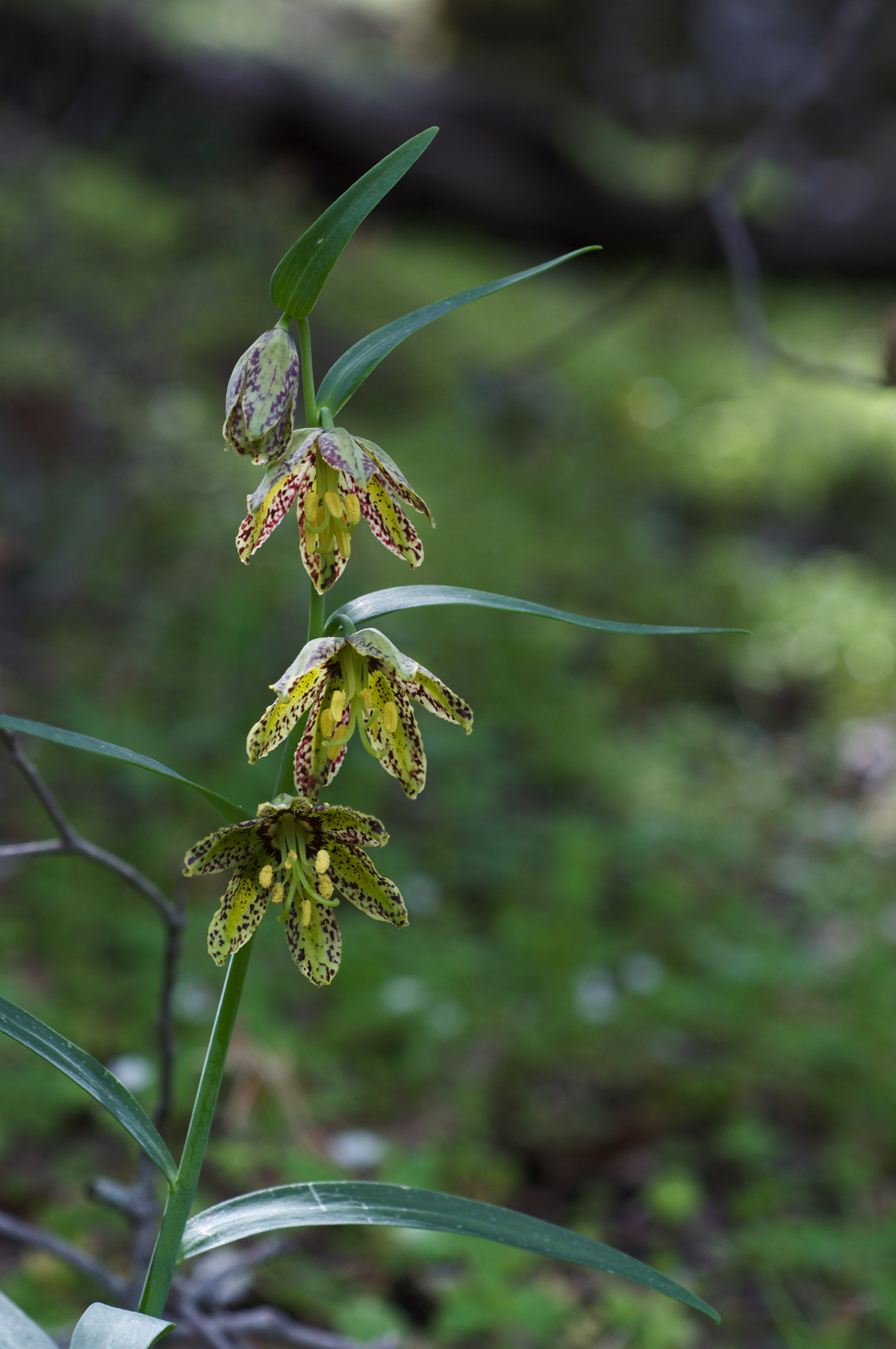

Conservation status
- Secure (NatureServe)

Scientific classification
- Kingdom: Plantae
- Clade: Embryophytes
- Clade: Tracheophytes
- Clade: Spermatophytes
- Clade: Angiosperms
- Clade: Monocots
- Order: Liliales
- Family: Liliaceae
- Subfamily: Lilioideae
- Genus: Fritillaria
- Species: F. affinis

Binomial name
- Fritillaria affinis (Schult. & Schult.f.) Sealy

Synonyms
- Fritillaria lanceolata Pursh; Fritillaria mutica Lindl.; Fritillaria lunellii A.Nelson; Fritillaria phaeanthera Purdy; Fritillaria eximia Eastw.

= Fritillaria affinis =

Species of flowering plant

Fritillaria affinis, the chocolate lily, is a highly variable species of flowering plant in the lily family Liliaceae native to western North America.

== Description ==
It grows from a bulb, which resembles a small mass of rice grains. The stems are 10–120 centimetres (4–47 inches) tall. The flowers are produced in the spring, nodding, 1–4 cm (1/2–1 1/2 in), yellowish or greenish brown with a lot of yellow mottling to purplish black with little mottling, or yellow-green mottled with purple. The leaves are in whorls.

There are two varieties:

- Fritillaria affinis var. affinis: This is the more common and widespread variant, occurring throughout the plant's range. It can be differentiated by its strong mottling pattern. Its bulb has 2 to 20 small scales.
- Fritillaria affinis var. tristulis: This variant is much less widespread; it is found only in Marin County on the north coast of California. It has a much more subtle mottling pattern and is generally darker overall. Its bulb has 60 to 100 small scales.
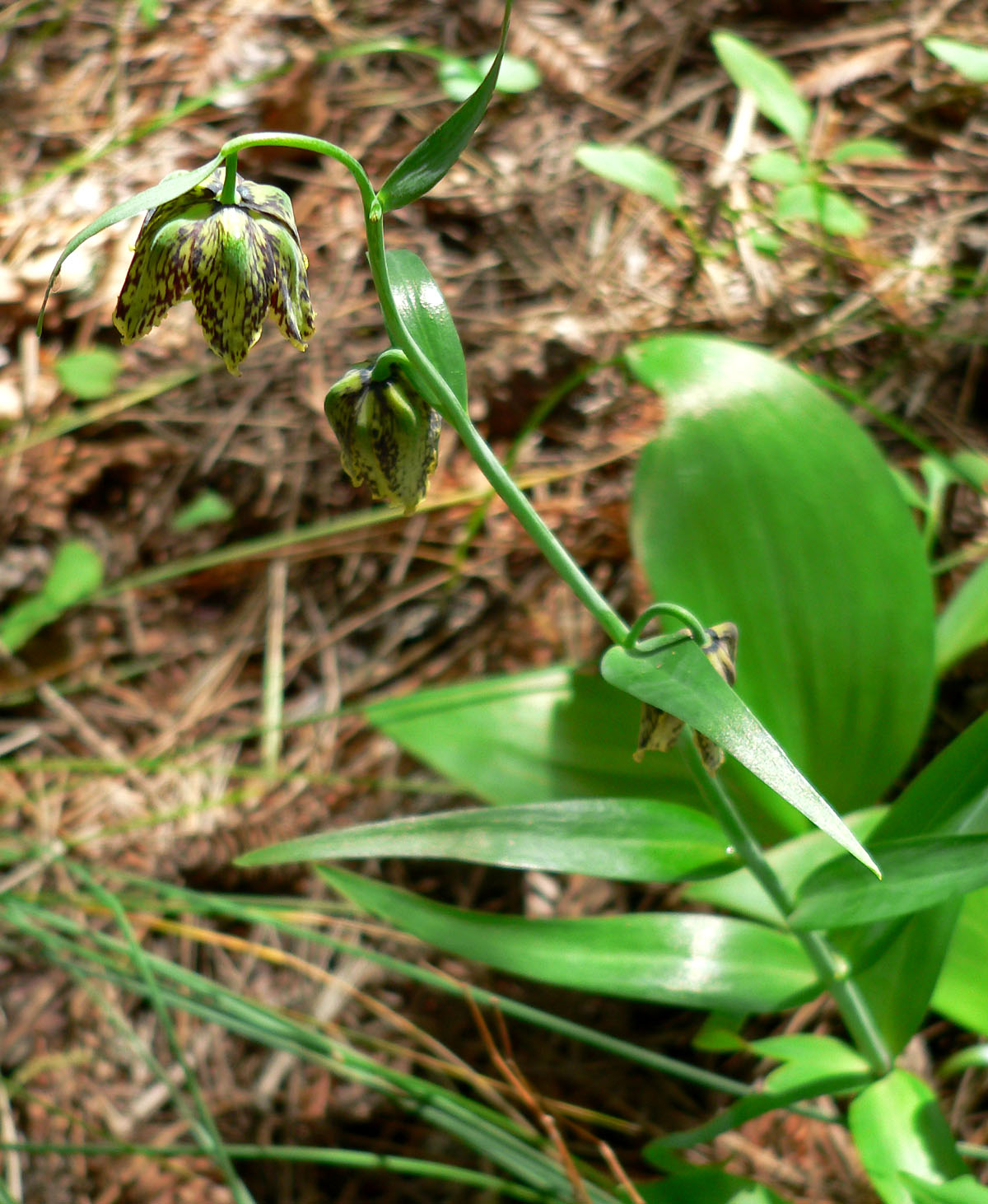
Plant habit

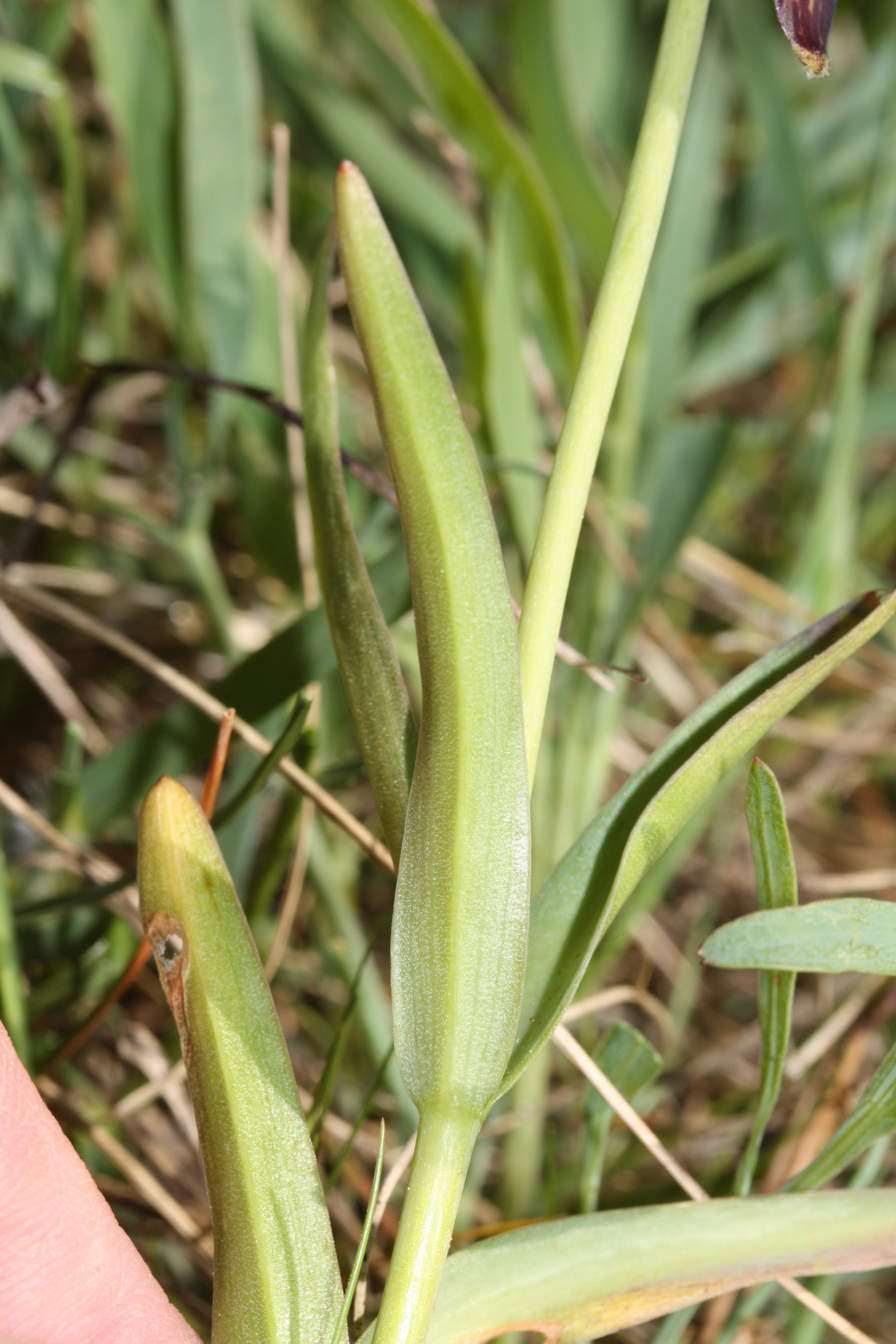
Leaves and stem

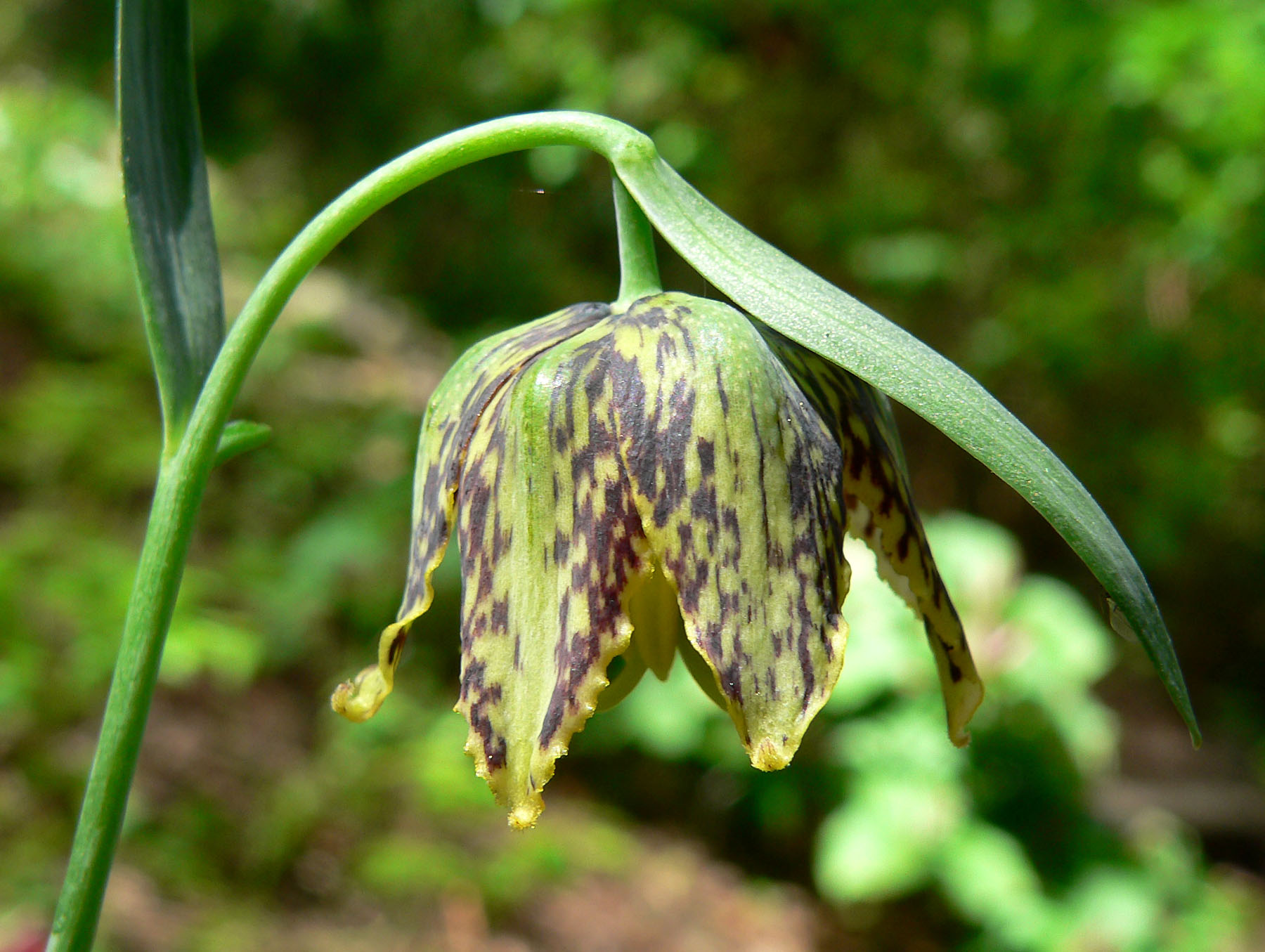
Flower

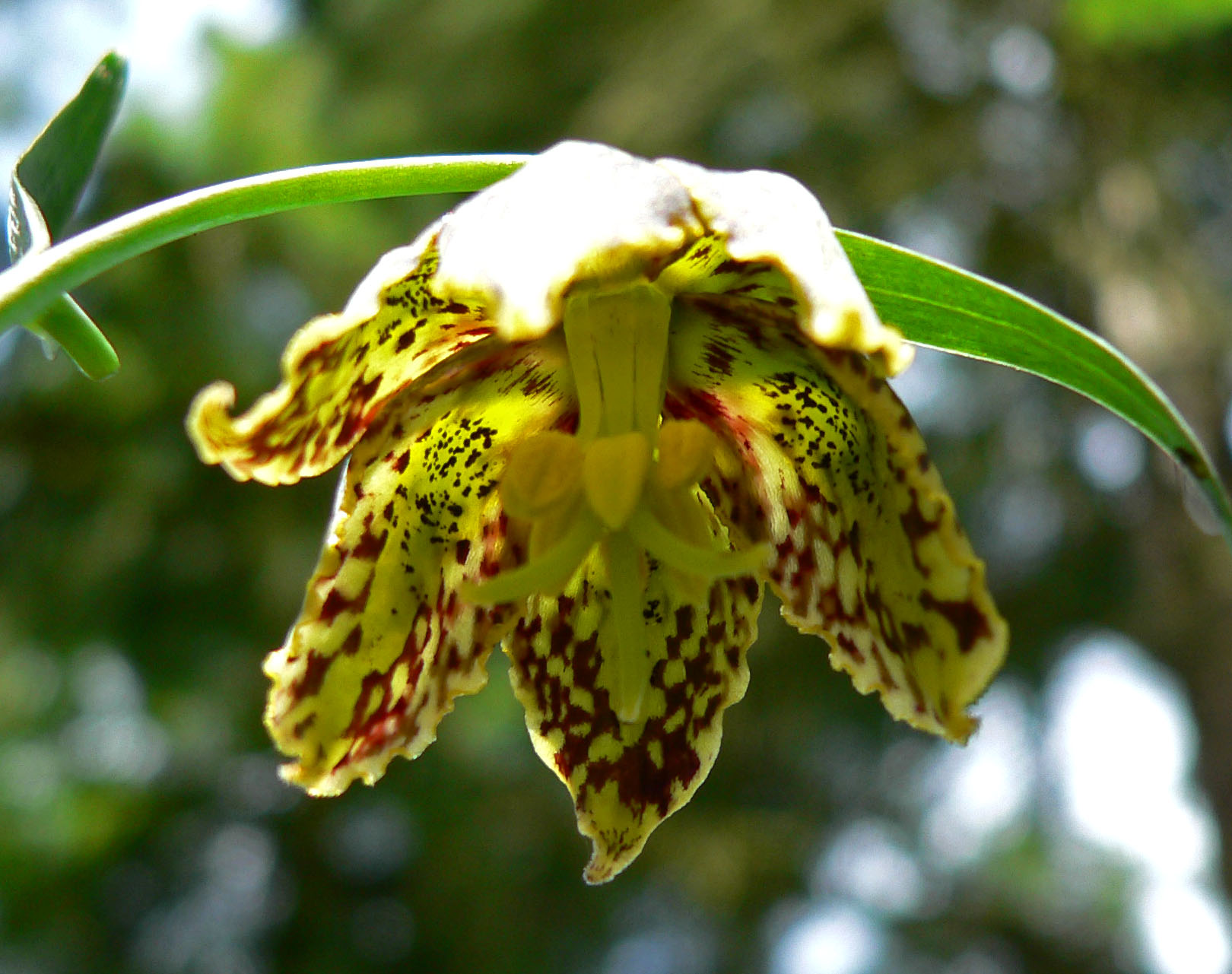
Flower underside

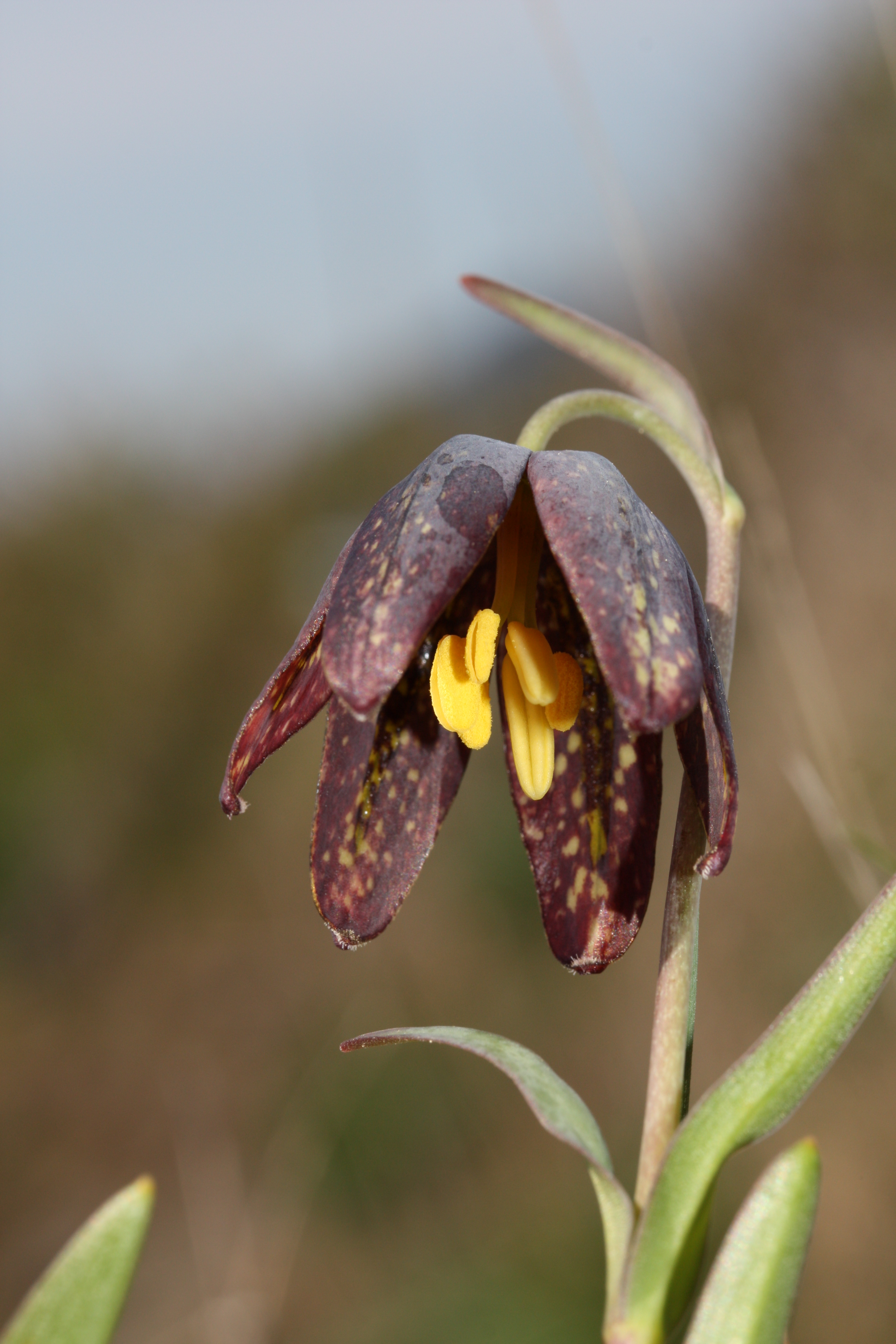
Dark flower

== Distribution and habitat ==
It can be found in California, Klamath Ranges, the north coast ranges, Cascade Ranges, north Sierra Nevada foothills, and the San Francisco Bay Area, north to British Columbia, Oregon, Washington, Montana and Idaho.

Its habitat includes oak or pine scrub or open woods and thickets near the coast. It prefers low to mid-elevation, shade or part shade, dry summer dormancy, and good drainage.

== Uses ==
The roots or bulbs can be eaten raw or cooked. Historically, the bulbs of this plant were eaten steamed by Salish Native American peoples, including the Squamish, Sechelt, Halq'emeylem and Straits Salish.

== See also ==
- List of plants known as lily
