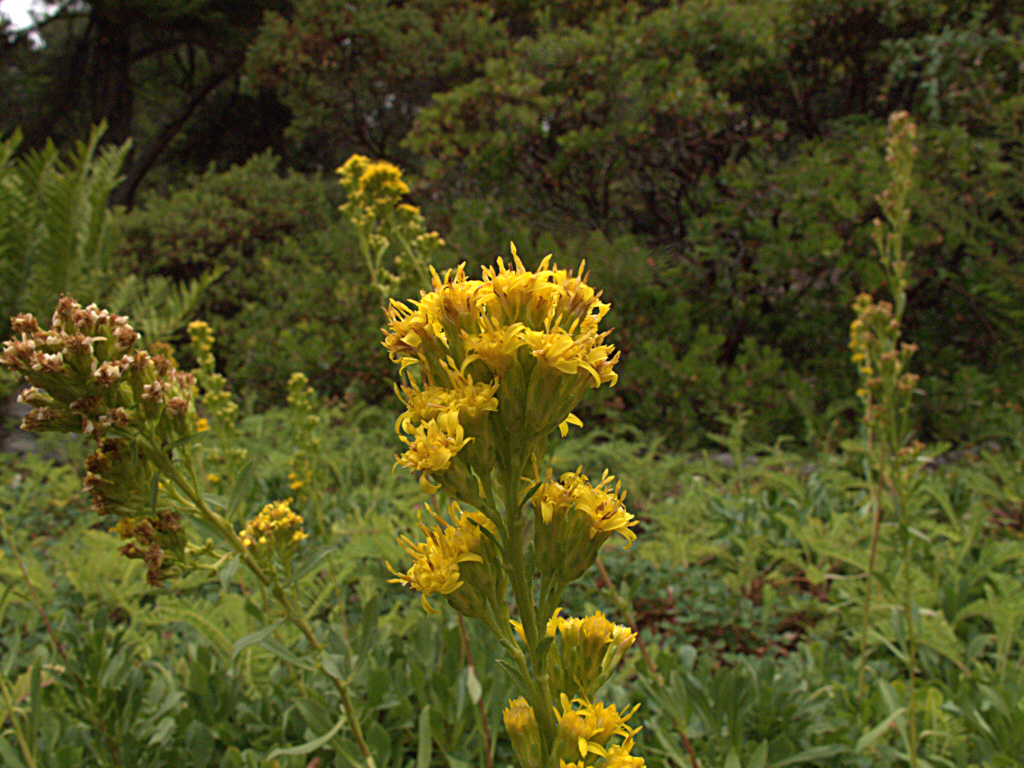

Scientific classification
- Kingdom: Plantae
- Clade: Tracheophytes
- Clade: Angiosperms
- Clade: Eudicots
- Clade: Asterids
- Order: Asterales
- Family: Asteraceae
- Genus: Solidago
- Species: S. spathulata

Binomial name
- Solidago spathulata DC.

Synonyms
- Synonymy: Aster candollei Kuntze 1891 not Harv. 1865; Homopappus spathulatus (DC.) Nutt.; Solidago simplex var. spathulata (DC.) Cronquist; Solidago spiciformis Torr. & A.Gray

= Solidago spathulata =

Species of flowering plant

Solidago spathulata, the coast goldenrod or dune goldenrod, is a North American species of goldenrod in the family Asteraceae.

== Description ==
Solidago spathulata is perennial herb up to 80 centimetres (31 in) tall with a branching underground caudex. One plant can produce a branching array of as many as 100 yellow flower heads, each about 6 millimetres (1/4 in) across and with about 8 rays.

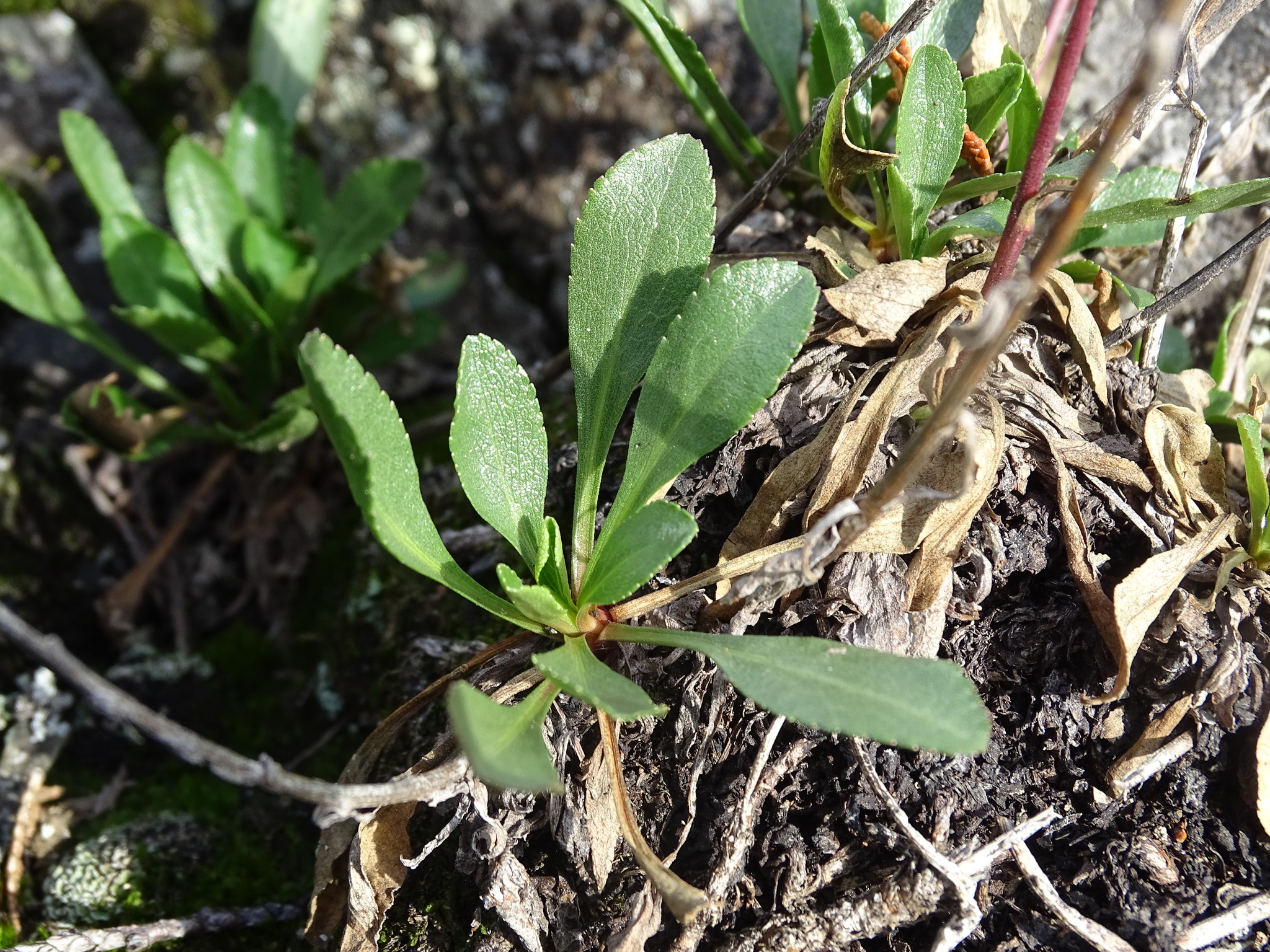
Basal leaves

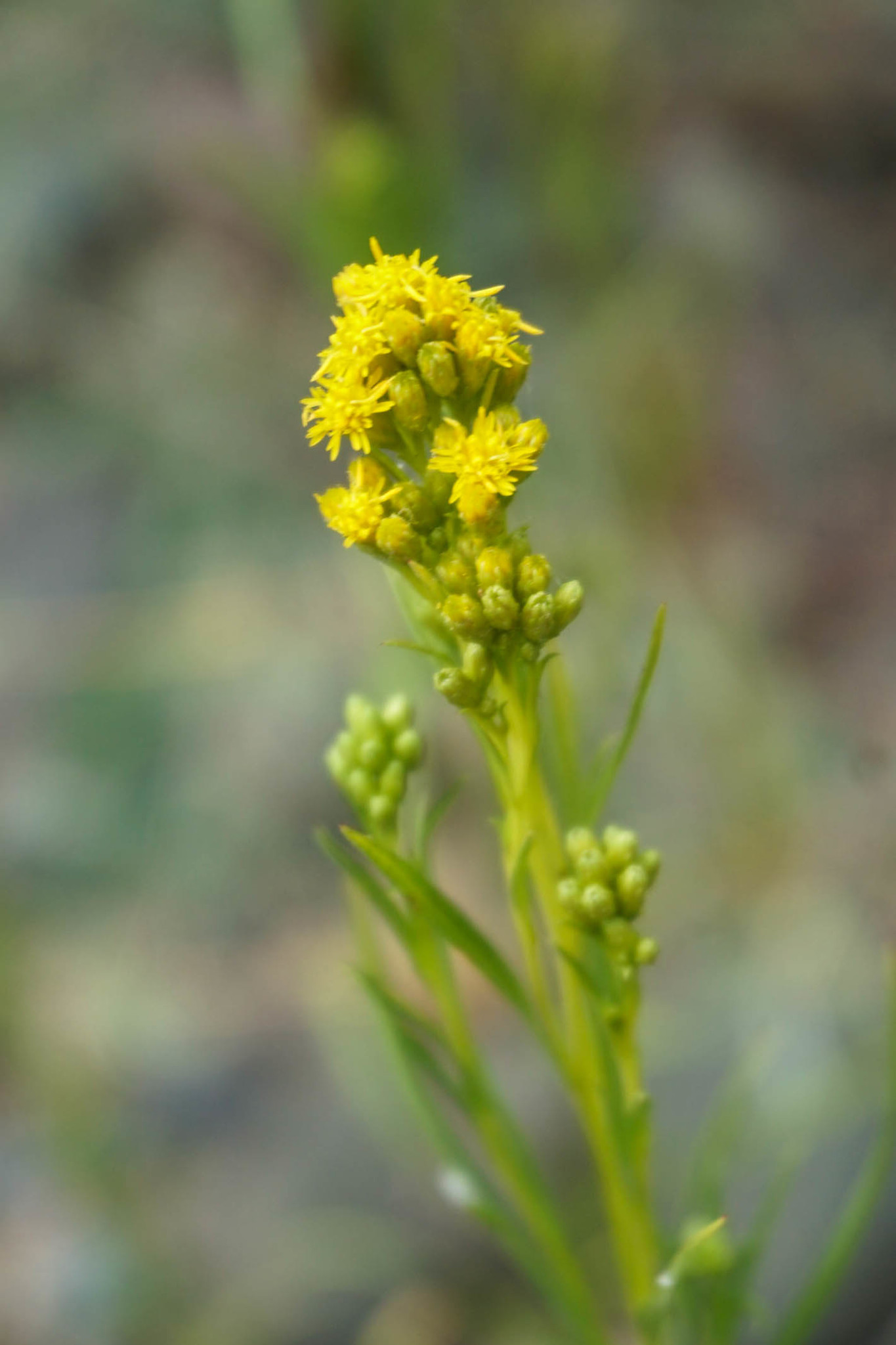
Flowers

=== Similar species ===
It resembles S. multiradiata, which replaces it in montane regions and has bristles on its leaf stalks.

== Distribution and habitat ==
It is native to the Pacific Coastal regions of the United States, in the states of Oregon and California. It grows on coastal sand dunes and hillsides.
