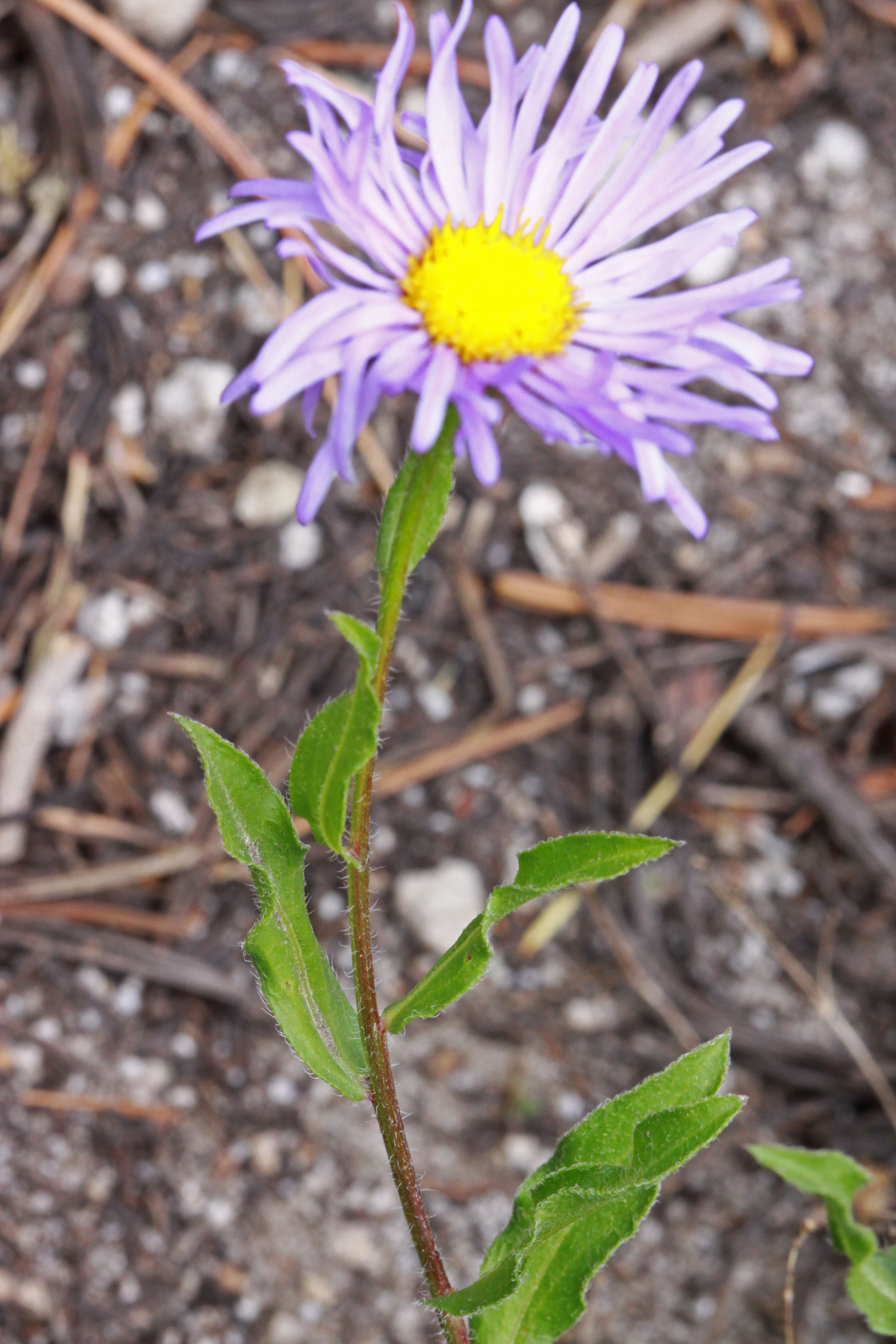

Conservation status
- Secure (NatureServe)

Scientific classification
- Kingdom: Plantae
- Clade: Tracheophytes
- Clade: Angiosperms
- Clade: Eudicots
- Clade: Asterids
- Order: Asterales
- Family: Asteraceae
- Genus: Erigeron
- Species: E. subtrinervis

Binomial name
- Erigeron subtrinervis Rydb. ex Porter & Britton

Synonyms
- Erigeron glabellus var. mollis A.Gray; Erigeron glabellum var. molle A.Gray; Erigeron bakeri Wooton & Standl.; Erigeron incanescens Rydb.; Erigeron speciosus var. mollis (A.Gray) S.L.Welsh

= Erigeron subtrinervis =

Species of flowering plant

Erigeron subtrinervis, called the three-nerved daisy, the three-nerve fleabane, or the hairy showy daisy, is a North American species of flowering plants in the family Asteraceae. It grows in various mountains of western Canada and the western United States: Rocky Mountains, northern Cascades, Black Hills, etc., from British Columbia and Washington state east to North Dakota and south as far as New Mexico.

Erigeron subtrinervis grows in openings and along roadsides in aspen groves and conifer forests, as well as on ridges and mountain peaks at high elevations. It is a perennial herb up to 90 cm (3 feet) tall, producing underground rhizomes and a woody caudex. The inflorescence generally contains 1-21 flower heads per stem, in a flat-topped array. Each head contains 100–150 purple or lavender ray florets surrounding many yellow disc florets.
