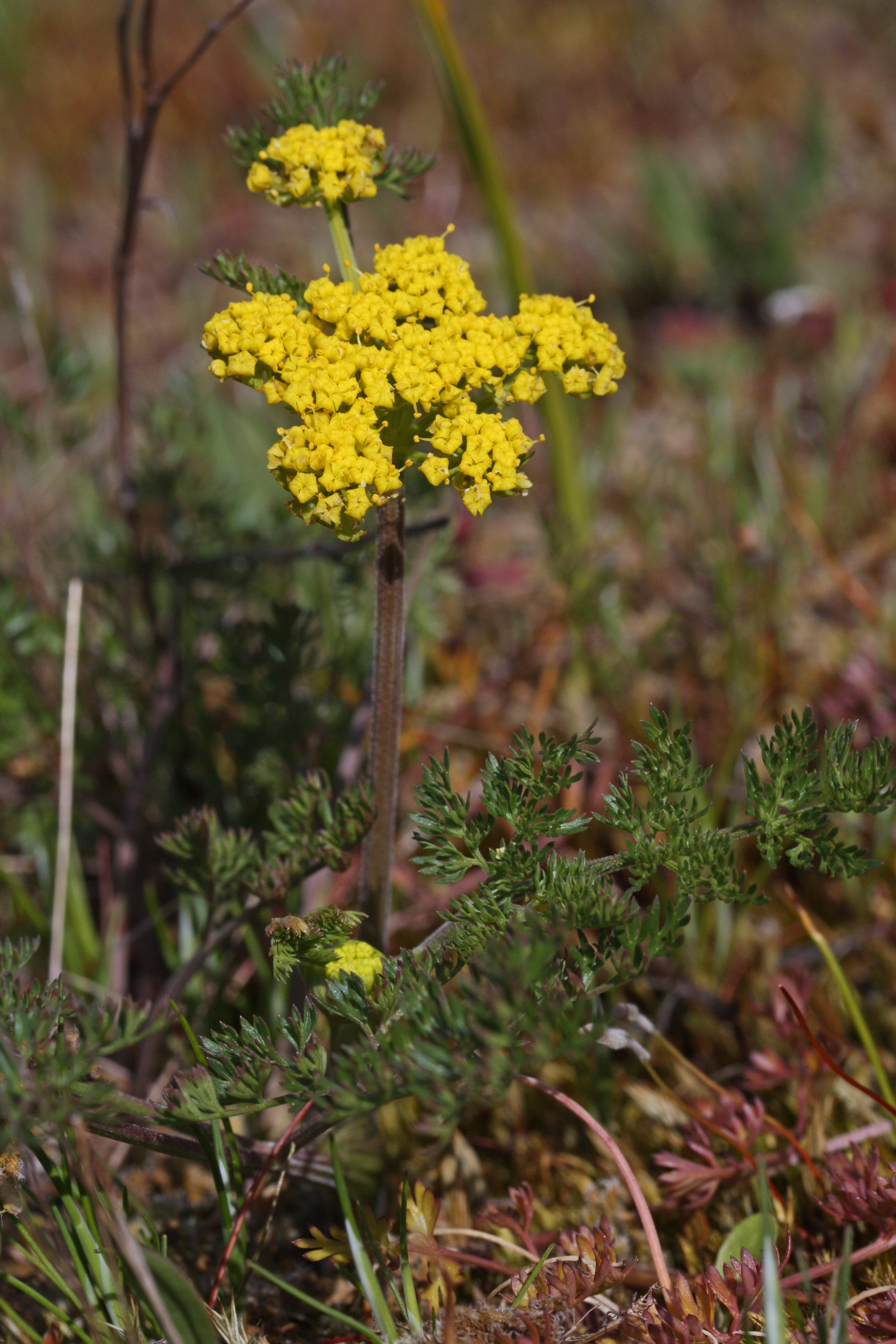

Scientific classification
- Kingdom: Plantae
- Clade: Tracheophytes
- Clade: Angiosperms
- Clade: Eudicots
- Clade: Asterids
- Order: Apiales
- Family: Apiaceae
- Genus: Lomatium
- Species: L. utriculatum

Binomial name
- Lomatium utriculatum (Nutt. ex Torr. & A.Gray) J.M.Coult. & Rose

= Lomatium utriculatum =

Species of flowering plant

Lomatium utriculatum is a species of flowering plant in the carrot family known by the common name common lomatium or spring gold. It is native to western North America from British Columbia to California, where it grows in many types of habitat including chaparral, and in the Sierra Nevada.

== Description ==
Lomatium utriculatum is a hairless to lightly hairy perennial herb growing up to 0.5 meters (1 1/2 feet) tall from a slender taproot. The leaves are basal and also grow from the middle and upper sections of the stem, 5–15 centimeters (2–6 inches) long on a 2–10 cm (3/4–4 in) stalk. Each leaf is generally divided and subdivided into many small linear lobes. Leaves higher on the stem have prominent sheaths. The inflorescence is a webbed umbel of yellow flowers with rays up to 12 cm (4 1/2 in) long, blooming from February to June and expanding to 25 cm (10 in) across while in fruit. The fruit is seedlike and 5–10 millimeters (3/16–3/8 in) long.

== Range and habitat ==
Lomatium utriculatum is native to western North America from British Columbia to California, where it grows in many types of habitat including chaparral, and in the Sierra Nevada. In Washington, Oregon, and British Columbia it is found most often west of the Cascade Mountain crest, unlike most Lomatium species, which grow in dry areas east of the Cascades.

== Uses ==
This plant was used as a food and medicinal remedy by many Native American groups, some of whom ate the fresh leaves raw.
