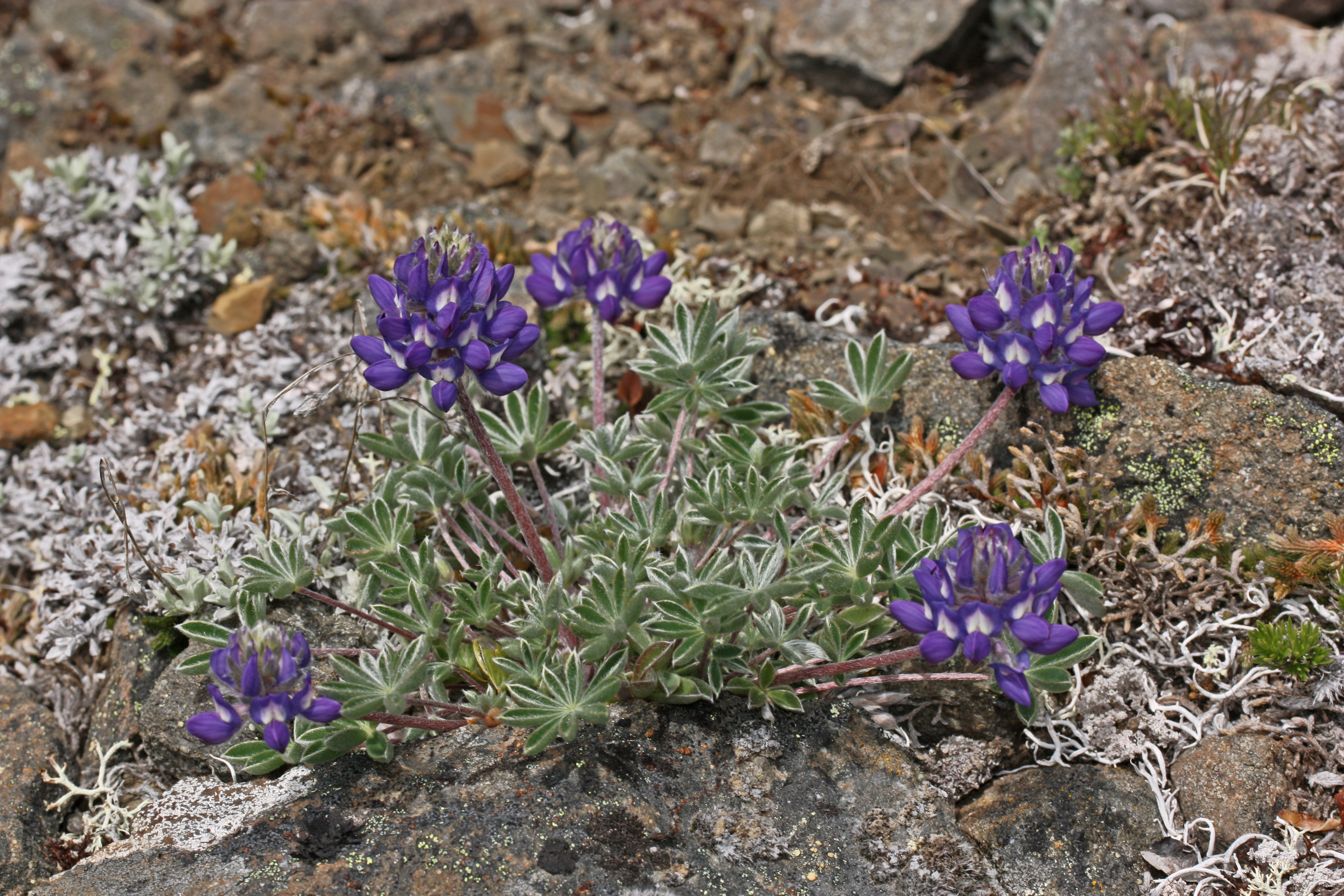
- Lupinus lepidus var. lobbii (prairie lupine)

Scientific classification
- Kingdom: Plantae
- Clade: Embryophytes
- Clade: Tracheophytes
- Clade: Angiosperms
- Clade: Eudicots
- Clade: Rosids
- Order: Fabales
- Family: Fabaceae
- Subfamily: Faboideae
- Genus: Lupinus
- Species: L. lepidus

Binomial name
- Lupinus lepidus Lindl., 1828

= Lupinus lepidus =

Species of legume

Lupinus lepidus, the Pacific lupine, prairie lupine or dwarf lupine is a perennial herbaceous plant in the pea family (Fabaceae) native to western North America.

== Description ==
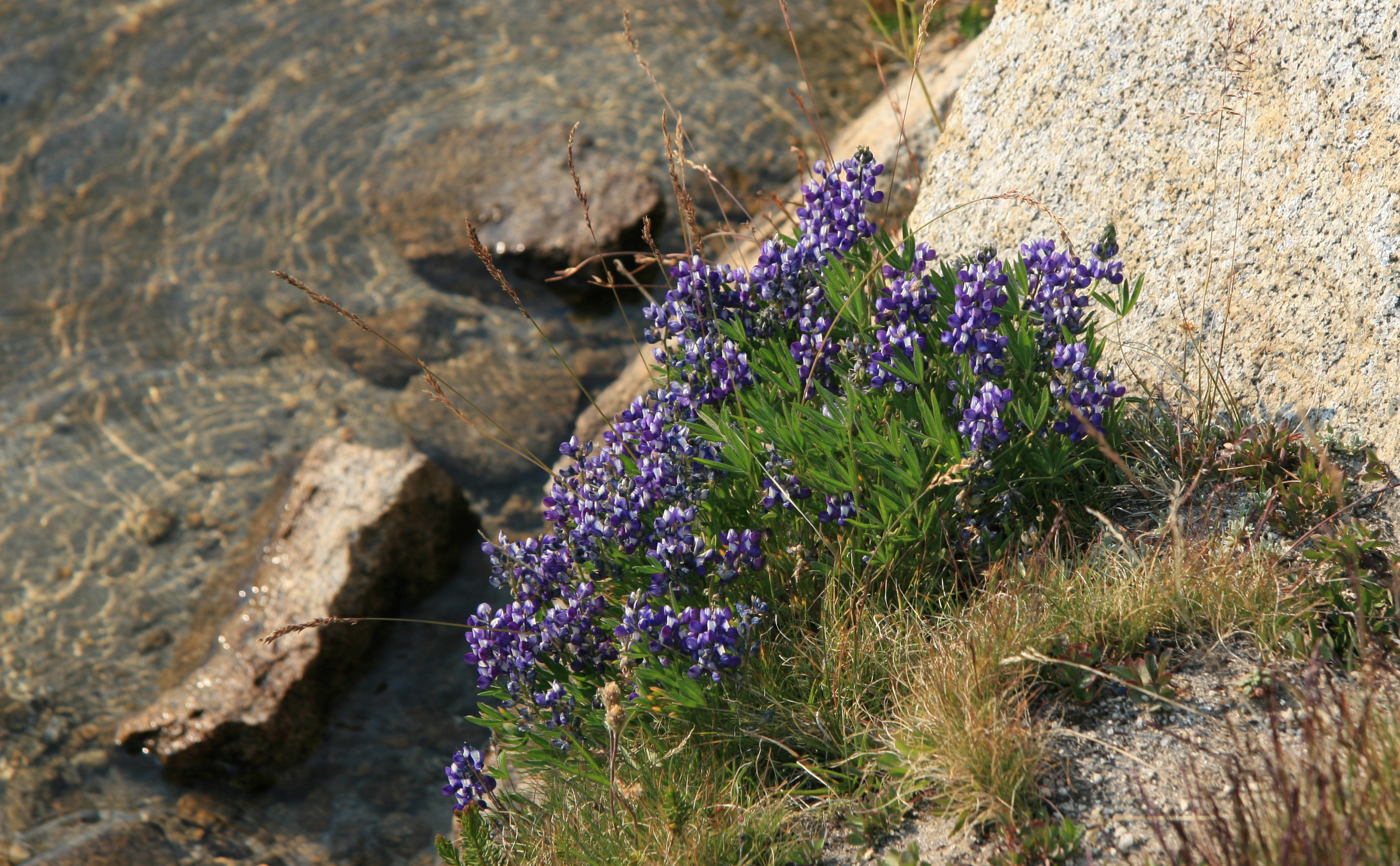
Specimen of the Sierra Nevada

Lupinus lepidus is a small hairy perennial that reaches 10 to 61 centimetres (4 to 24 inches). Palmately compound leaves extend up the stem, but most are basal. The inflorescence is a dense spike-like raceme, with pink, purple, or blue flowers that often have a yellowish spot. The plant blooms from mid-April through August, depending on elevation and habitat. The fruit is a pod containing multiple seeds.

== Taxonomy ==
Many varieties have been described, several of which are considered separate species by some authorities.

== Distribution and habitat ==
The species is endemic to western North America, where it may be found in open areas from low prairie, open montane forest, to the alpine. Although rare in British Columbia, its range extends south from Alaska to southern California and eastward to the Rocky Mountains. In California, it is mainly a species of meadows and areas that are moist during the spring growing season in the Sierra Nevada mountain range, from 1,500 to 3,000 metres (4,900 to 9,800 ft).
