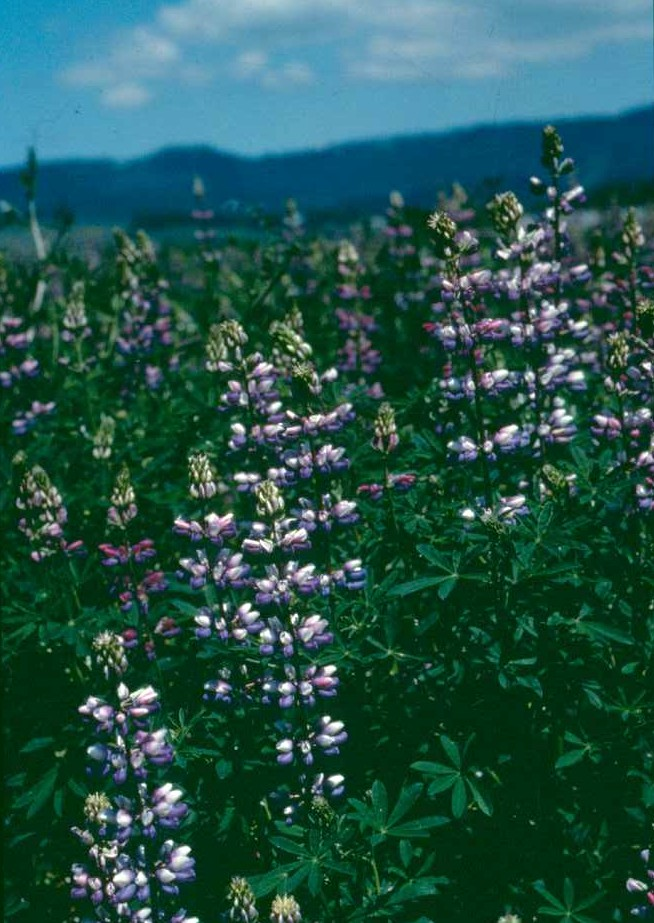

Scientific classification
- Kingdom: Plantae
- Clade: Tracheophytes
- Clade: Angiosperms
- Clade: Eudicots
- Clade: Rosids
- Order: Fabales
- Family: Fabaceae
- Subfamily: Faboideae
- Genus: Lupinus
- Species: L. albicaulis

Binomial name
- Lupinus albicaulis Dougl.

= Lupinus albicaulis =

Species of legume

Lupinus albicaulis is a species of lupine known by the common name sicklekeel lupine. It is native to the western United States from Washington to California, where it grows mostly in mountain habitat. It is a hairy, erect perennial herb often exceeding a meter in height. Each palmate leaf is made up of 5 to 10 leaflets each up to 7 centimetres (2 3/4 in) long. The inflorescence is up to 44 centimetres (17 in) long, bearing whorls of flowers each 1 to 1.6 centimetres (1/3 to 2/3 in) long. The flower is purple to yellowish or whitish in color and has a sickle-shaped keel. The fruit is a silky-hairy legume pod up to 5 centimetres (2 in) long containing several seeds. In Oregon, where the plant is native, it has been cultivated for several uses, including reforestation and revegetation of roadsides and other disturbed habitat.
