= Griffin School =

Griffin School may refer to:

== Basic and secondary education ==
- Griffin School District, Olympia, Washington, USA
- Griffin High School (Georgia), Griffin, Georgia, USA
- Sacred Heart-Griffin High School, Springfield, Illinois, USA

== Higher education ==
- Harvard Kenneth C. Griffin Graduate School of Arts and Sciences, Harvard University, in Massachusetts
- Kenneth C. Griffin School of Computer Science, Carnegie Mellon University, in Pennsylvania
- Kenneth C. Griffin Department of Economics at the University of Chicago, in Illinois
