= Marshall Middle School =

There are several Marshall Middle Schools in the United States.

They include:

- Marshall Middle School (Long Beach), California
- Marshall Middle School (Olympia), Washington
- Marshall Middle School (Pittsburgh, Pennsylvania)
- Marshall Middle School (San Diego), California
- Marshall Middle School (Virginia), in Warrenton, Virginia
