= Percival Creek =

Creek in Thurston County, Washington state

- Etymology: Captain Percival, early settler

Physical characteristics
- Mouth
  - coordinates: 47°02′09″N 122°54′49″W
- Discharge
  - location: Percival Cove, Capitol Lake

Basin features
- Geographic Names Information System: 1507379

Percival Creek is a stream in Thurston County in the U.S. state of Washington. The creek empties into Percival Cove, a bay within Capitol Lake.

Percival Creek was named after Captain Percival, an early settler. Filtered runoff gathered at Yauger Park's water retention pond complex in West Olympia is released into Black Lake Ditch, running from Percival Creek to Capitol Lake, draining into the Salish Sea at Budd Inlet.

== See also ==
- List of geographic features in Thurston County, Washington
- List of rivers of Washington (state)
