= Heritage Park (Olympia, Washington) =

Public park in Olympia, Washington

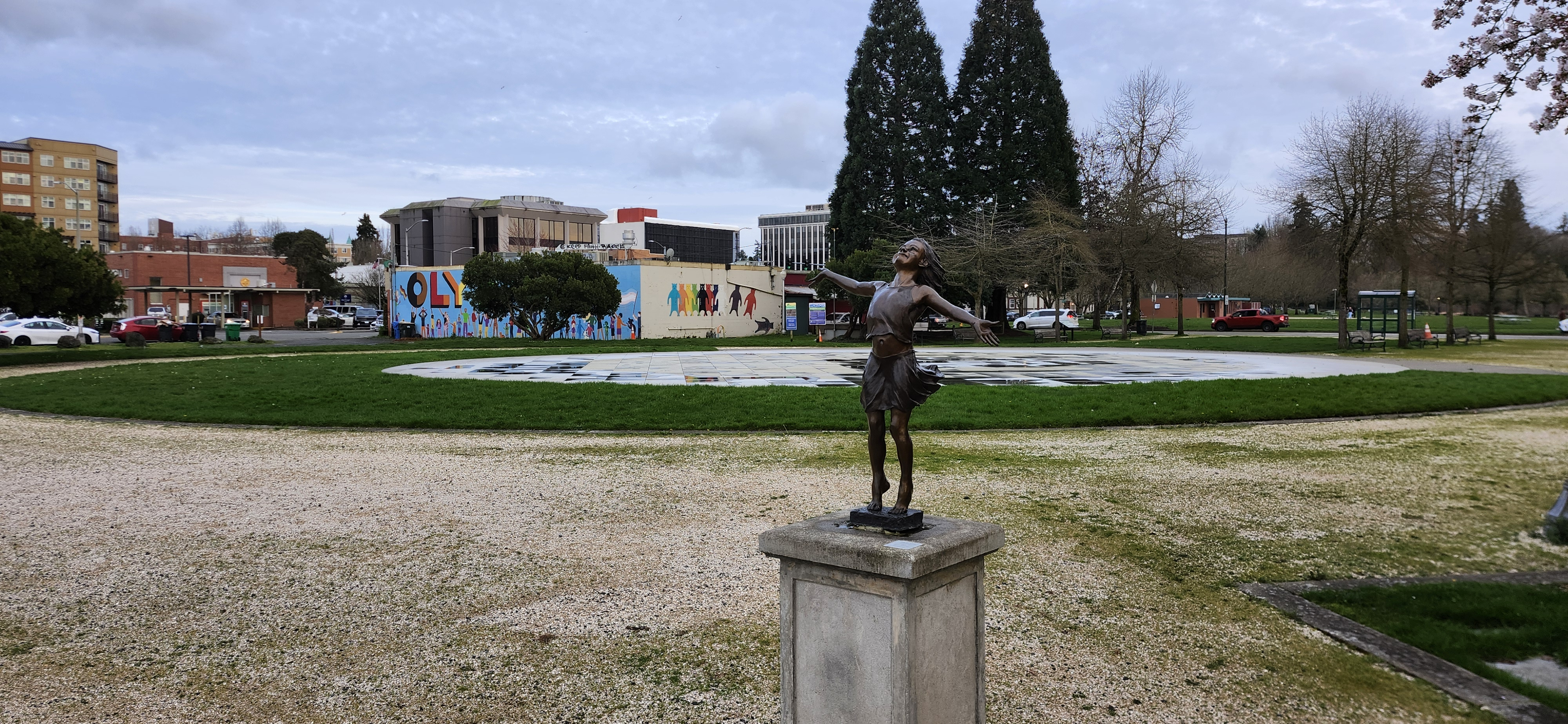
- Splashpad at Heritage Park, 2026
- Interactive map of Park location
- Type: Urban Park
- Location: 330 5th Ave SW, Olympia, Washington
- Coordinates: 47°02′39″N 122°54′18″W
- Area: 24 acres (9.7 ha)
- Owner: Washington state
- Status: Open
- Hiking trails: 2
- Habitats: Waterfront
- Water: Capitol Lake
- Collections: Public art
- Parking: Parking lot
- Events: Capital Lakefair
- Facilities: Amphitheater
- Website: Washington State Capitol Campus - Heritage Park

Heritage Park is a 24-acre (9.7 ha) state-owned park adjacent to the campus of the Washington State Capitol, Capitol Lake and downtown Olympia, Washington.

== Recreation ==
Heritage Park contains two trails around Capitol Lake and connect to the State Capitol Campus; an amphitheater area is also available for modest events. The park is home to the Heritage Park fountain, a sprayground located on a 1.1-acre (0.45 ha) parcel across from Percival Landing.

The park is host to the annual Lakefair festival, which takes places in July.

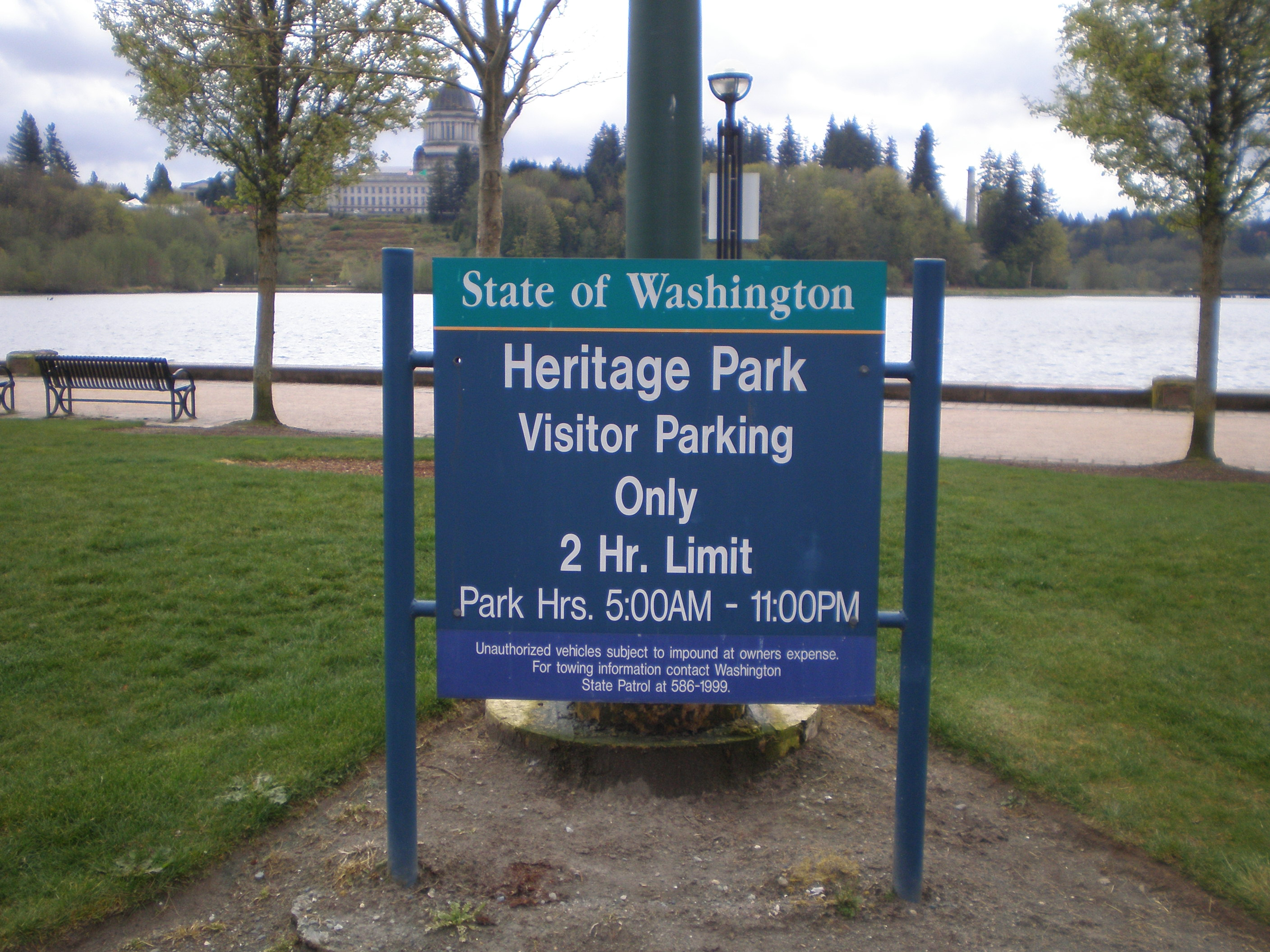
Park sign; view of Capitol Lake and State Capitol, 2011

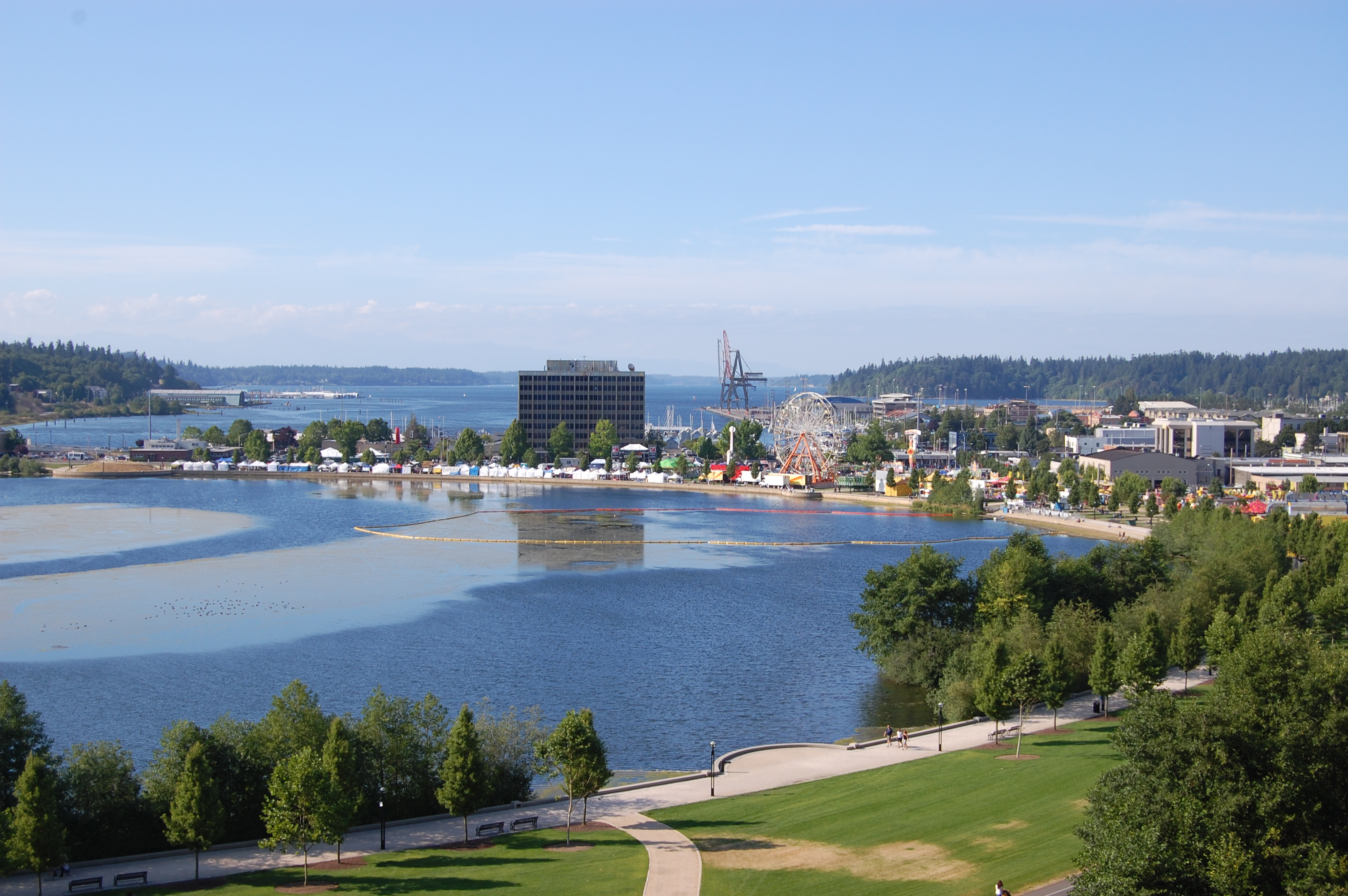
Capital Lakefair at Heritage Park, 2008

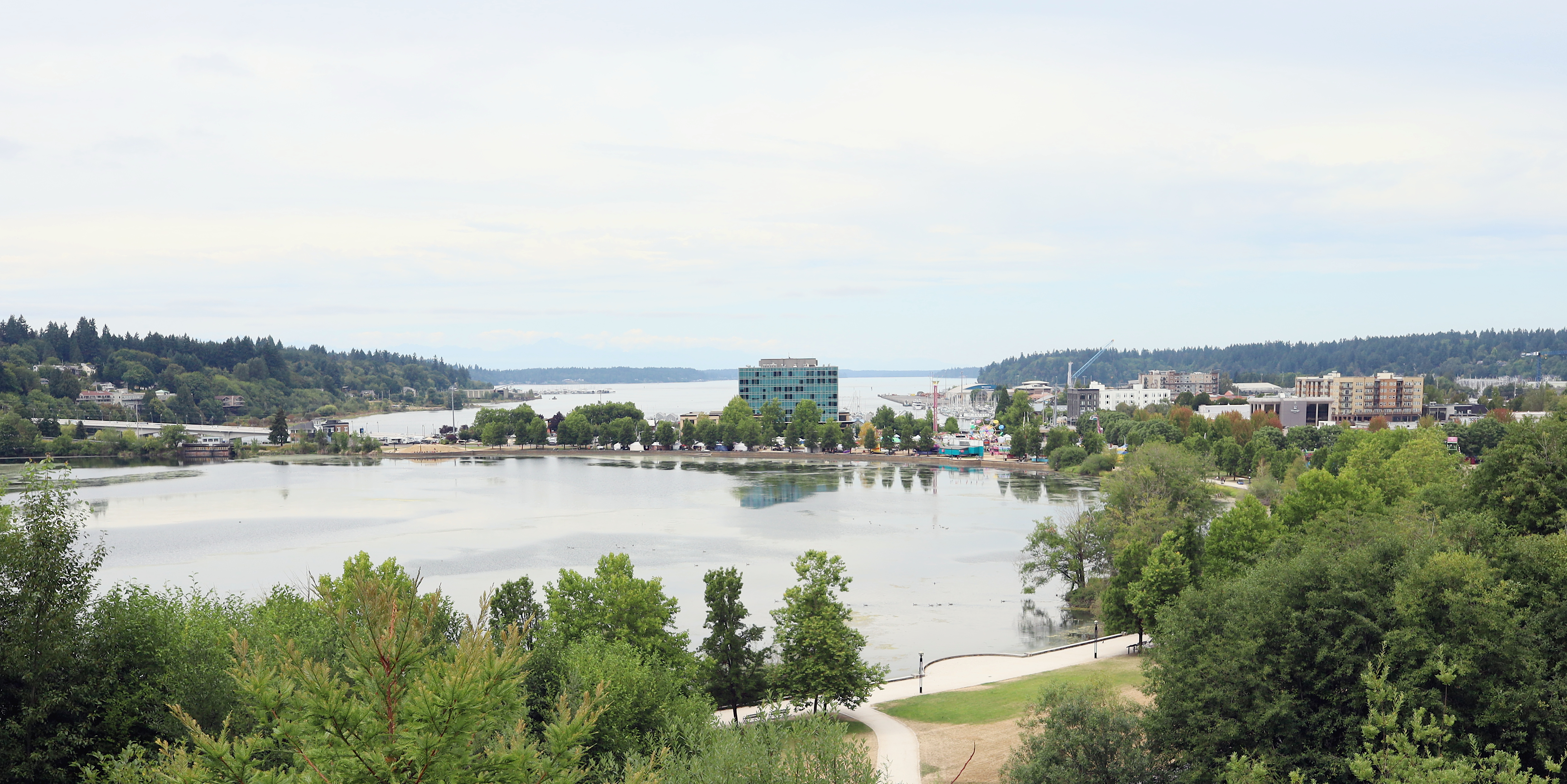
Capitol Lake, 2025

== Ecology ==
Heritage Park is vulnerable to flood waters; on January 7, 2022, the park experienced significant flooding as a result of a 17.9 foot (5.5 m) king tide.

== See also ==
- History of Olympia, Washington
- Parks and recreation in Olympia, Washington
