= Yauger Park =

Park in Olympia, Washington

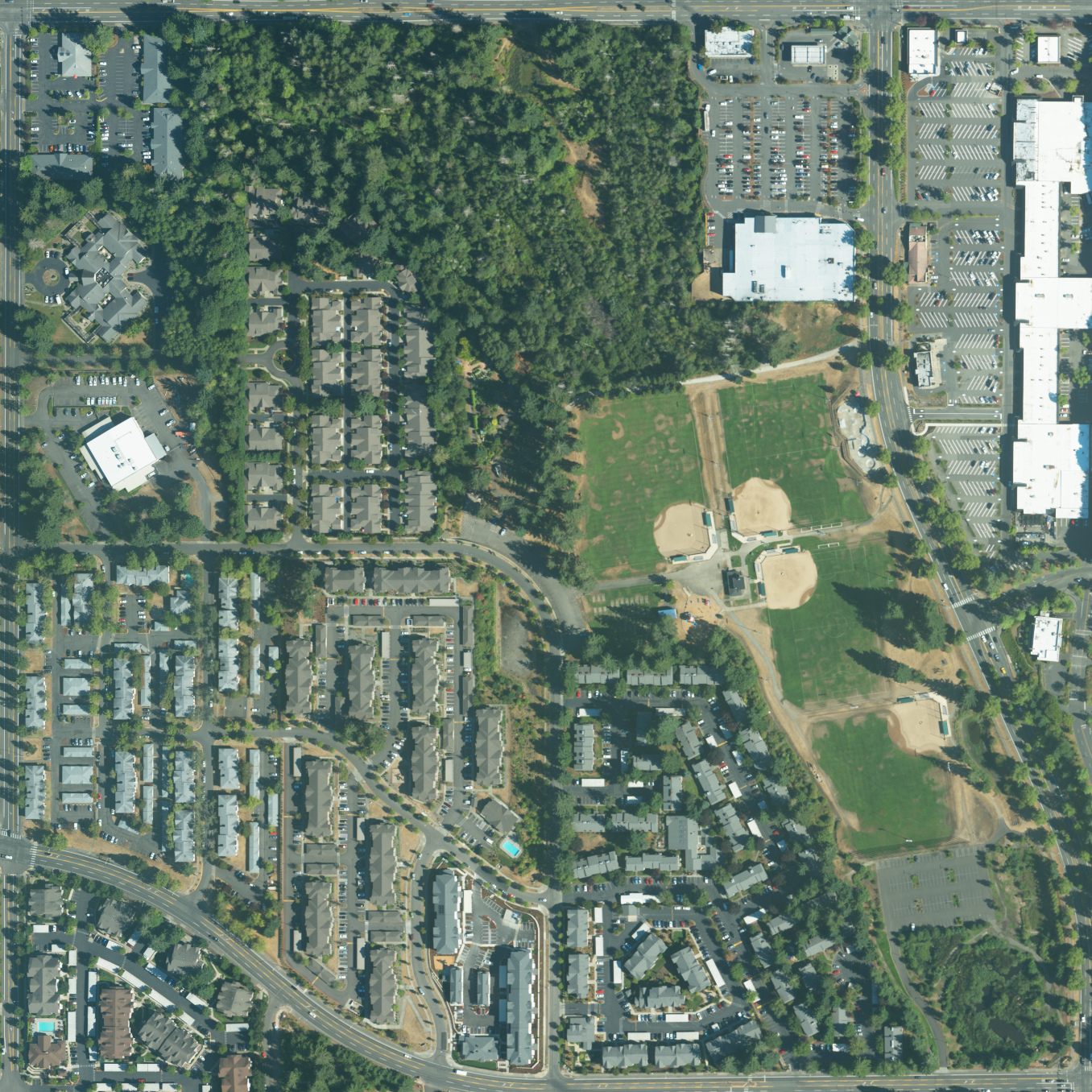
- Park and surrounding area in August 2023
- Type: Sports, recreation, wetlands
- Location: 3100 Capital Mall Drive SW, Olympia, Washington (Note: An alternate address, providing direct access to the park, is 503 Alta Street SW. which is also near a recycling drop-off area and the demonstration garden.)
- Coordinates: 47°02′37″N 122°56′33″W
- Area: 48.99-acre (19.83 ha)
- Established: 1982
- Etymology: Named after the Yauger family
- Owner: City of Olympia
- Status: Open
- Camp sites: 0
- Paths: Sidewalks, jogging path, nature trail
- Terrain: Flat
- Water: Wetlands with stormwater retention ponds
- Parking: Two parking lots
- Public transit: Intercity Transit
- Facilities: Bathrooms, concession stand

Yauger Park is a mixed-use recreation and sports park in Olympia, Washington across from Capital Mall. The park contains a natural filtering water retention system that serves as a wetland preserve and is home to a community and demonstration garden.

The 49-acre (20 ha) park was created in the early 1980s on land once owned by the Yauger family. The grounds were purposefully constructed to flood and the stormwater retention area was expanded twice, in 1995 and during a large scale project completed in 2011. A system of bioswales, ponds, rain gardens, and weirs can hold up to 27 million US gallons (100 Ml) of urban runoff from hundreds of acres in the surrounding West Olympia neighborhood. The natural filtration system connects with other bodies of water, including Capitol Lake, delivering clean water throughout the local ecosystem until it reaches Budd Inlet.

The ponds, located in the southern portion of the park, form part of a 5-acre (2.0 ha) wetland area and during most of the year, is home to various species of aquatic creatures and waterfowl. The stormwater grounds were intentionally built to create a habitat for wildlife. A forested area in the northern portion, near the gardens, is home to a variety of birds.

Most sports and recreational amenities were built as part of the early beginnings of Yauger Park. Features include baseball fields and space for additional sports, a competition horseshoe pit area, a jogging path, a nature trail, playground, and a skate park. The skate park was built in 2000 after a community-led initiative.

Ongoing issues at Yauger Park regarding safety, such as drug use and homeless camps, have been a focal point in the 21st century. Yauger Park contains the last athletic complex created in Olympia.

== History ==
Yauger Park was first developed beginning in 1982 (Note: Reports during a 2009-2011 stormwater retention upgrade list the beginning year of the park as 1978, based on submitted plans during the project.) by United States Army Colonel Kendall Yauger after he and his sister, Ruth, sold the land to the city of Olympia. The land, part of a larger 410-acre (170 ha) claim, was originally owned by Kendall and Ruth's parents, Reverend and Mrs. Francis Yauger, in the early 20th century. The family claim's acreage was sold over time in parcels that eventually became Capital Mall and the campus of Capital High School.

The park was specifically constructed to be used for both recreational activities and as a stormwater retention area. Baseball fields were constructed between 1980 and 1982 and a playground area with wood equipment was added. A competitive, horseshoe pit area was created and the Olympia Horseshoe Pitching Club was formed, practicing at Yauger Park since the early 1980s.

A skate park was constructed in 2000, with improvements made in 2016. The idea for a skateboarding site was first conceived in the late 1990s as a place for skateboarders to legally practice their abilities. Estimated to cost $250,000, skateboarders and residents in the community raised half the funds with the city covering the remaining expenditures.

The first disc golf course in the city was opened at Yauger Park in May 2007; it was a nine-hole course, paid for and built by a local disc gold association. The Yaguer Park community garden was completed in 2011, becoming the second community garden in an Olympia recreational area after Sunrise Park. Consisting of approximately 70 plots, the garden parcels were originally sold to residents for $25 per year; the first plantings were Olympian blueberries.

The park, in 2019, was one of four sites in the city to be a location for glass recycling drop-offs. The city deemed that glass would no longer be recycled via normal trash pickup due to excess costs, recycling difficulties, and international policy changes.

Yauger Park has struggled with safety issues in the 21st century with concerns over drug use and garbage at the site, as well as homeless camping. As of 2025, the athletic complex at Yauger Park is the last such type to be constructed in Olympia.

=== Renovations and upgrades ===
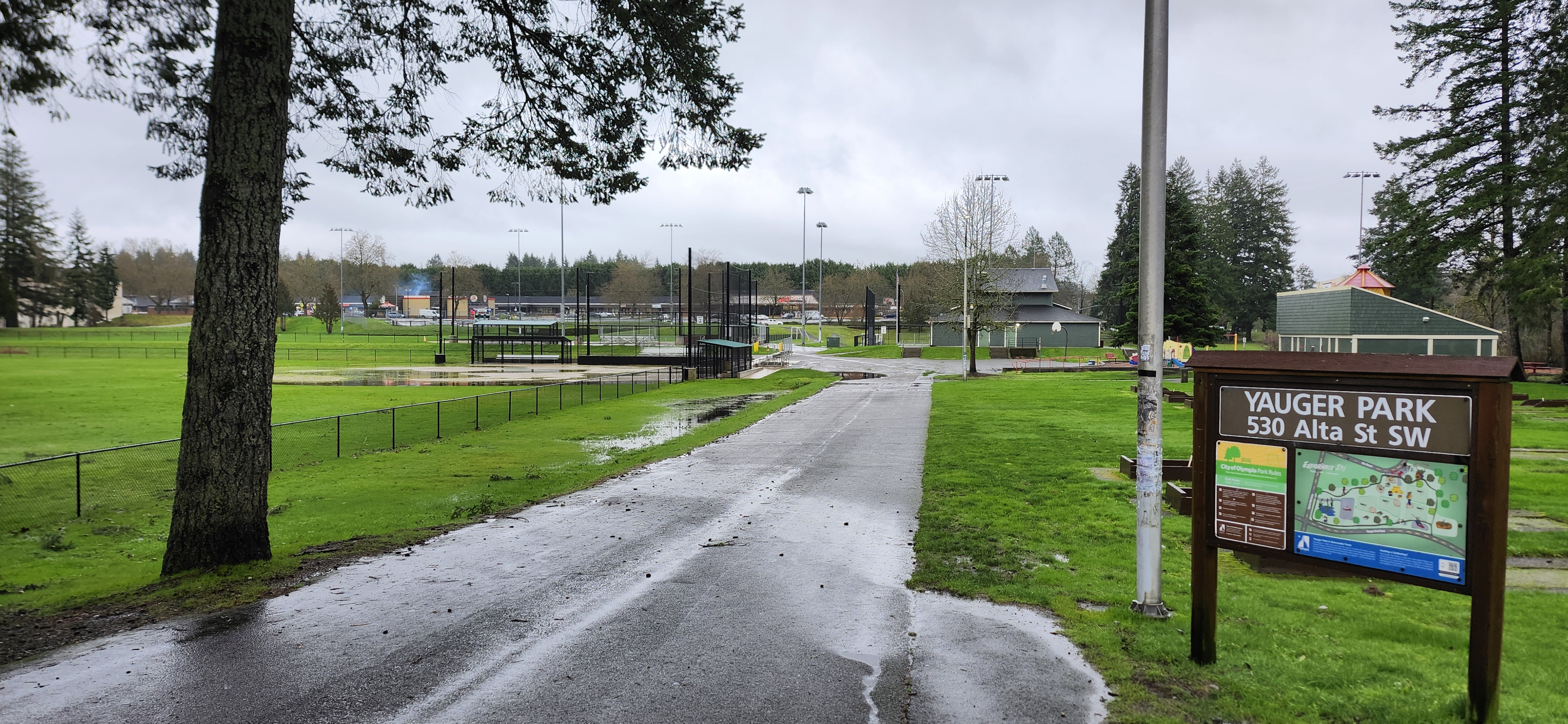
Yauger Park, Alta Street, 2026

Renovation and upgrade projects in the 21st century include an almost $3 million effort completed in 2013 to increase the holding capacity of the stormwater pond system and the construction of a new playground. The play area was original to the park and updated with a section for pre-school children; a 25 foot (7.6 metres)-tall "Mega Tower" was added. An installation of a paved parking lot at the baseball fields was also part of the project. To make room for the additional ponds, the disc golf course was removed.

A bike pump track was opened in 2015. Located at the north end of the park near the skate area, the closed loop circuit was known as the Yauger Park Bike Skills Area.

A $1.4 million renovation project began in June 2022 to restore the ballfields. The original chain link backstop was replaced, deemed too short to protect spectators; the outfield fences had been previously increased in height during a retention pond project in 2011 to protect the wetland area from baseballs. A conversion of the dugouts was undertaken in part to comply with the Americans with Disabilities Act of 1990. Additional efforts in the park included concrete work, installation of an irrigation system, and improvements to the pathways on the grounds.

== Geography ==
Yauger Park is located in an urban area of West Olympia and is immediately west of Capital Mall. Residential neighborhoods and commercial business areas surrounds the park. A forested refuge, once the sighting of a cougar in 2008, borders the park to the north.

== Features ==
The 48.99-acre (19.83 ha) grounds (Note: The listed acreage has varied based on the source or as the park has been enlarged. Yauger Park was recorded to be 39.7 acres (16.1 ha) in 2004. See other sourcing throughout the page.) contain a variety of ballfields or playing surfaces, a horseshoe court, a nature trail, an 11,500-square-foot (1,070 m^{2}) skate park, and a flat running track. Two parking lots are available; one lot rests in the area prone to flooding. The site hosts a summer-only concession stand and a covered picnic shelter. The park contains two gardens, a community garden situated next to the Dirt Works Demonstration Garden.

=== Retention pond ===
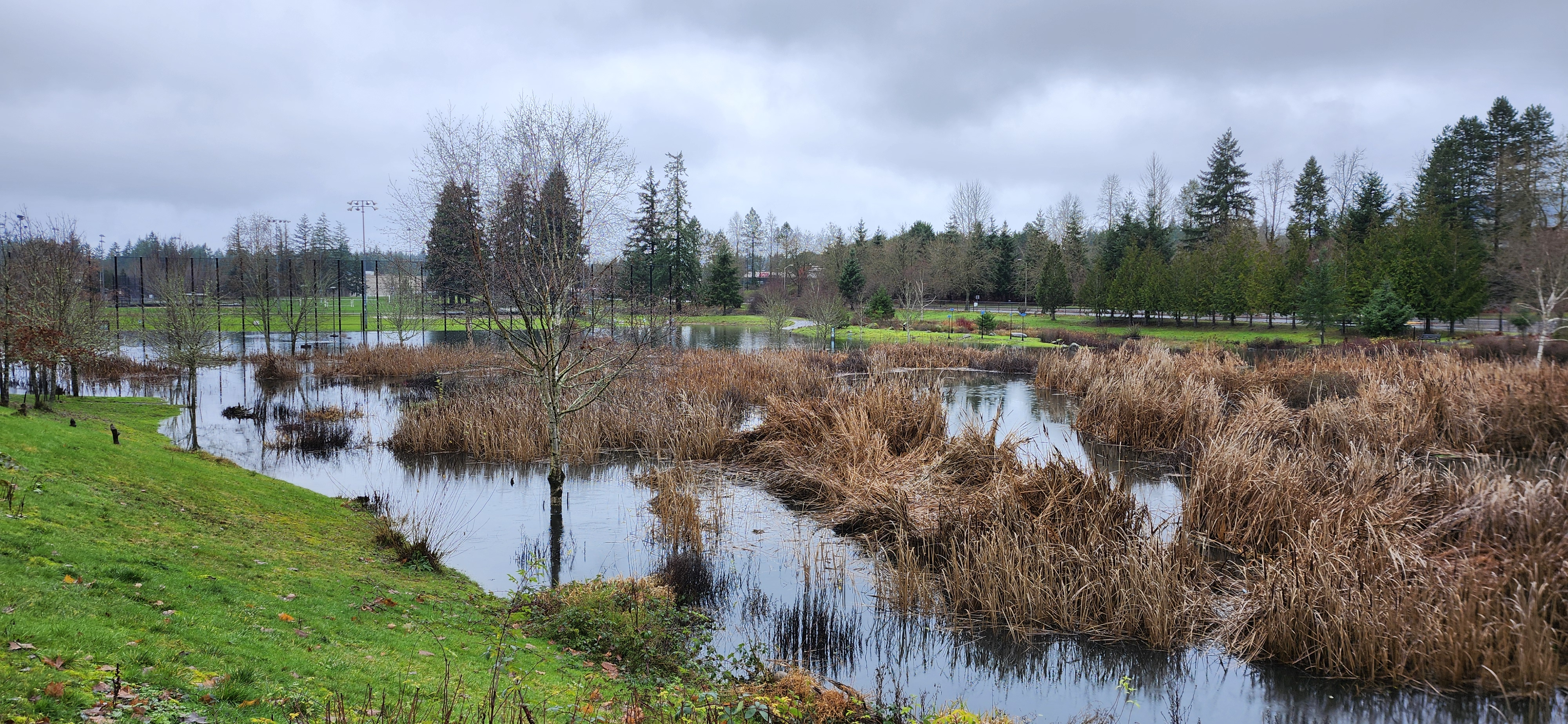
Retention pond, 2026

Yauger Park was intentionally constructed to flood, specifically during the winter months. A stormwater retention pond, 5.67 acres (2.29 ha) in size, is located at the south end of the grounds and captures urban runoff from approximately 570 acres (230 ha) in West Olympia. The system is known as the Yauger Park Regional Stormwater Complex.

The water is slowly released via an underground pipe system into Black Lake Ditch via the Black Lake Meadows wetlands complex. The complex, a 45-acre (18 ha) parcel that was once a homestead at Percival Creek, was a $1.7 million reconstruction effort completed in 1995 to help divert excess water from the park. Through a series of other storm ponds and wetlands, the waters connect with Percival Creek and Capitol Lake. The runoff is naturally filtered before it enters Budd Inlet and the Salish Sea. The flooded area of the park becomes a temporary wetland and contains a system of bioswales and weirs to hold up to 27 million US gallons (100 Ml) of water.

The park and its retention pond is part of a larger ecosystem management initiative which includes participation of the Washington Department of Fish and Wildlife (WDFW) and local indigenous tribal nations and communities. Volunteer groups, such as Puget Sound Starts Here and the Stream Team of Thurston County, provide additional resources.

The pond and retention area was expanded beginning in 2009 to combat additional runoff due to an increase of urban development in West Olympia. Despite a holding capacity of 65 acre feet of water, runoff excess in the park had led to increased local road flooding in the 2000s. The ponds, made of irregular shapes, were deepened and surrounded with walking paths; a footbridge over the ponds was also built. Rain gardens were constructed as was a new stormwater facility. The original gravel parking lot was replaced with porous asphalt. Specific attention was given to landscaping, built to encourage wildlife such as birds and fish to habitat in the area. Completed in October 2011, the $2.4 million upgrade project was funded by a federal stimulus grant and allowed for an increased capacity of up to 72 acre feet of water, or an additional 20% more runoff. The capture of pollutants, such as heavy metals and oil, was estimated to increase by 60%.

As of 2024, the system has reached maximum operating capacity, which does not meet 50-year peak flow requirements, resulting in flooding problems in the area.

== Recreation ==
The park contains 2 miles (3.2 km) of pathways, including a nature trail that was built by students of Capital High School in 1986. Two small loops taking hikers past the two gardens in the northwest corner of the park. A 0.75-mile (1.21 km) jogging track loops around the ballfield area.

== Environment and ecology ==
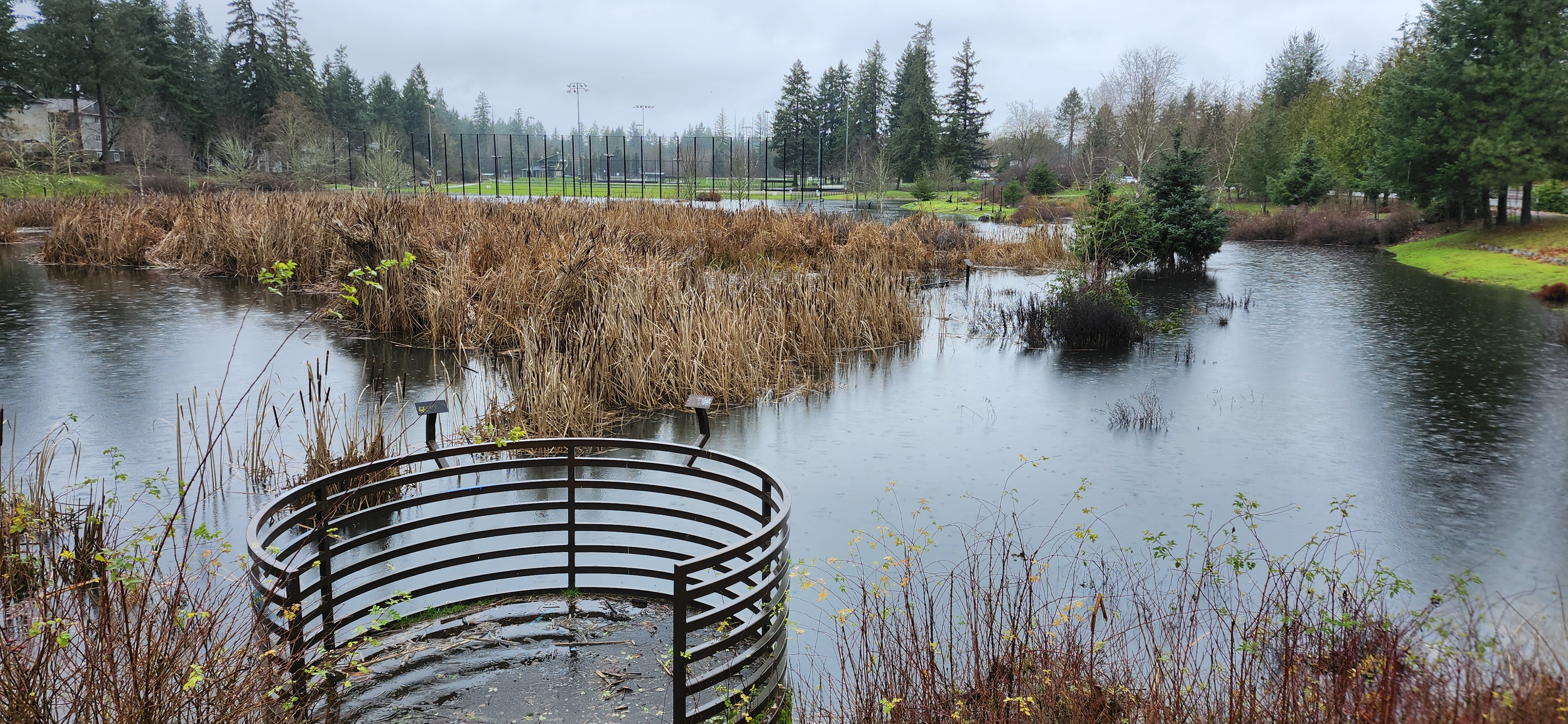
Retention pond, alternate view, 2026

During low levels of water retention at the park, the pond serves as a wetland area for aquatic, amphibian, and waterfowl species. Aquatic species include beaver, frogs, northwestern salamander, and the Olympic mud minnow, a fish listed under conservation protection by the state. Some invasive amphibians have been recorded but native species are considered to be abundant.

Recorded birds at the wetland area include red-winged blackbirds, buffleheads, wood ducks, and mergansers. Listed birds in the forested section include American robin, American goldfinch, junco, and rufous-sided towhees.

The park's demonstration garden was used as a recycling center for native vegetation within Thurston County. Part of an effort known as the Native Plant Salvage Project, the initiative was begun in 1994 to remove plants from construction sites before they were destroyed and placed in "holding beds" at Yauger Park. The plants were then transferred and replanted as part of restorations of waterways in the region or for use in urban landscaping.

== See also ==
- History of Olympia, Washington
- Parks and recreation in Olympia, Washington
