= Griffin School District =

School district in Washington, United States

Griffin School District 324 is a public school district headquartered in Olympia, Washington, US. It serves portions of Thurston County to the northwest of Olympia. As of May 2011, the district has an enrollment of 657 students.

The district operates one K-8 school, the Griffin School. High school students attend Capital High School in the adjacent Olympia School District. The Griffin School District operates buses to the high school.
