= Capital High School (Olympia, Washington) =

Location
- 2707 Conger Avenue; Olympia, Washington 98502; United States; 47.050833°N 122.934667°W

Information
- Type: Public High School
- Motto: Think, Explore, Grow.
- Established: 17 October 1975; 51 years ago
- School district: Olympia School District
- Principal: Condee Wood
- Staff: 136
- Teaching staff: 61.55 (FTE)
- Grades: 9 - 12
- Enrollment: 1,326 (2023-2024)
- Student to teacher ratio: 21.54
- Colors: Red & Yellow
- Fight song: Fight, Fight, Fight You Mighty Cougars and Go On To Victory
- Mascot: Cougars
- Newspaper: Outlook
- Website: capital.osd.wednet.edu

Capital High School (CHS), commonly referred to as Capital, is a public high school in Olympia, Washington, United States. It is one of two comprehensive high schools in the Olympia School District. Capital is located on Olympia's Westside, and serves the entire northwest corner of Thurston County. High School students from the Olympia School District and Griffin School District attend Capital.

== History ==
The grounds of Capital High School were originally owned by the Yauger family which sold the land off in parcels, eventually becoming of use for the campus, Capital Mall, and Yauger Park.

Capital High School started remodeling the building in 2005 and it was completed on 2006 costing about $10.5 million. The new remodel included a new student commons, a 400-seat auditorium, an auxiliary gymnasium, fitness room, modernization of the library, alternative education, administrative offices, and four pod areas. McGranahan Partnership of Tacoma designed the project.

On Christmas morning of 2008 around 5 A.M., one of the remodeled sections of roof collapsed due to heavy snow. About 2,500 square feet of roof collapsed causing fire alarm to go off. The collapse also broke a natural gas line but crews were able to shut off the gas before it caused any damage to the building.

== Sports ==
Capital High School is a 3A-division member of the Washington Interscholastic Activities Association. It is a member of the 3A South Sound Conference. (Capital High School was 4A-division until 2006–2007 season, 3A-division until 2007–2012 season, 2A-division until 2012-2014 and then moved back up to 3A Fall 2014).

State Championships
Season	Sport	Number of Championships	Year
Fall	Cross Country, Boys	1	1997
Fall	Football	2	1996, 1998
Fall	Golf, boys	6	1980, 1981, 1983, 1984, 1988, 1999
Fall	Swimming, girls	1	2001
Fall	Volleyball, girls	1	2017
Winter	Wrestling	1	2001
Spring	Baseball	2	1979, 1998
Spring	Softball, girls	4	1994, 1995, 1997, 1998
Spring	Tennis, boys	3	1990, 1992, 2014
Total		21	

State Championships, 2nd place:

Baseball - 1978, 1995, 1997; Boys Cross Country - 1996; Fastpitch Softball - 2007; Football - 2002; Boys Golf - 1987; Girls Golf - 1994; Girls Swimming - 2002; Boys Tennis - 1991, 1993; Girls Tennis - 1988, 1990; Girls Volleyball - 1994, 2013, 2014, 2019; Wrestling - 2000,

== Rivalries ==
Capital has many athletic rivalries with schools in the South Sound area, including Olympia, Tumwater, North Thurston and Timberline.

=== Olympia ( Spaghetti Bowl) ===
The main rival of Capital is the Crosstown Olympia Bears. The two schools play in the annual Spaghetti bowl football game. The first game was in 1977 and has been played periodically since then.

Capital victories	Olympia victories	Tie games

No.	Date	Location	Winner	Score
1	1977		Capital	27–7
2	1978		Capital	27–0
3	1979		Capital	23–19
4	1980		Olympia	21–14
5	1981		Olympia	55–14
6	1982		Olympia	28–7
7	1983		Capital	13–7
8	1984		Capital	21–20
9	1985		Capital	19–7
10	1986		Capital	17–7
11	1987		Capital	20–19
12	1988		Olympia	21–0
13	1989		Olympia	13–7
14	1990		Olympia	20–14
15	1991		Capital	24–0
16	1992		Capital	30–20
17	1993		Capital	49–6
18	1994		Capital	13–7
19	1995		Capital	35–14
20	1996		Capital	14–7
21	1997		Capital	27–24
22	1998		Olympia	24–21
23	1999		Olympia	28–13
24	2000		Capital	16–13 OT
25	2001		Olympia	31–12
26	2002		Capital	30–25
27	2003		Olympia	35–14
28	2004		Capital	29–6
29	2005		Olympia	14–7
30	2006		Olympia	49–14
31	2007		Olympia	31–7
32	2008		Olympia	7–0
33	2009		Olympia	35–28
34	2010		Capital	49–28
35	2011		Olympia	10–7
36	2012		Capital	19–0
37	2013		Olympia	20–6
38	2014		Capital	17–7
39	2015		Olympia	41–7
40	2020		Olympia	40–7
41	2022		Olympia	55–21
42	2024		Olympia	21–14
43	2025		Capital	33–27 OT

== Notable alumni ==
- David Ainuu, professional rugby player
- Spencer Allen, MLB coach
- Bill Bryant, Seattle Port Commissioner
- Brodie Buckland, 2012 Olympic rower
- Rachel Corrie, American peace activist
- Andres Gonzales, PGA golfer
- Jed Hansen, former MLB player (Kansas City Royals)
- Adam Kasper, record executive
- Joe Kraemer, former MLB player (Chicago Cubs)
- Travis Lee, former Major League Baseball player
- Amanda Moll, pole vaulter
- Hana Moll, pole vaulter
- Eloise Mumford, film and Broadway actress
- Joshua Phillips, professional soccer player, politician
- Jared Sandberg, former professional baseball player
- Tobi Vail, musician, Bikini Kill
