= Lakefair =

Annual summer festival in Olympia, Washington

Capital Lakefair
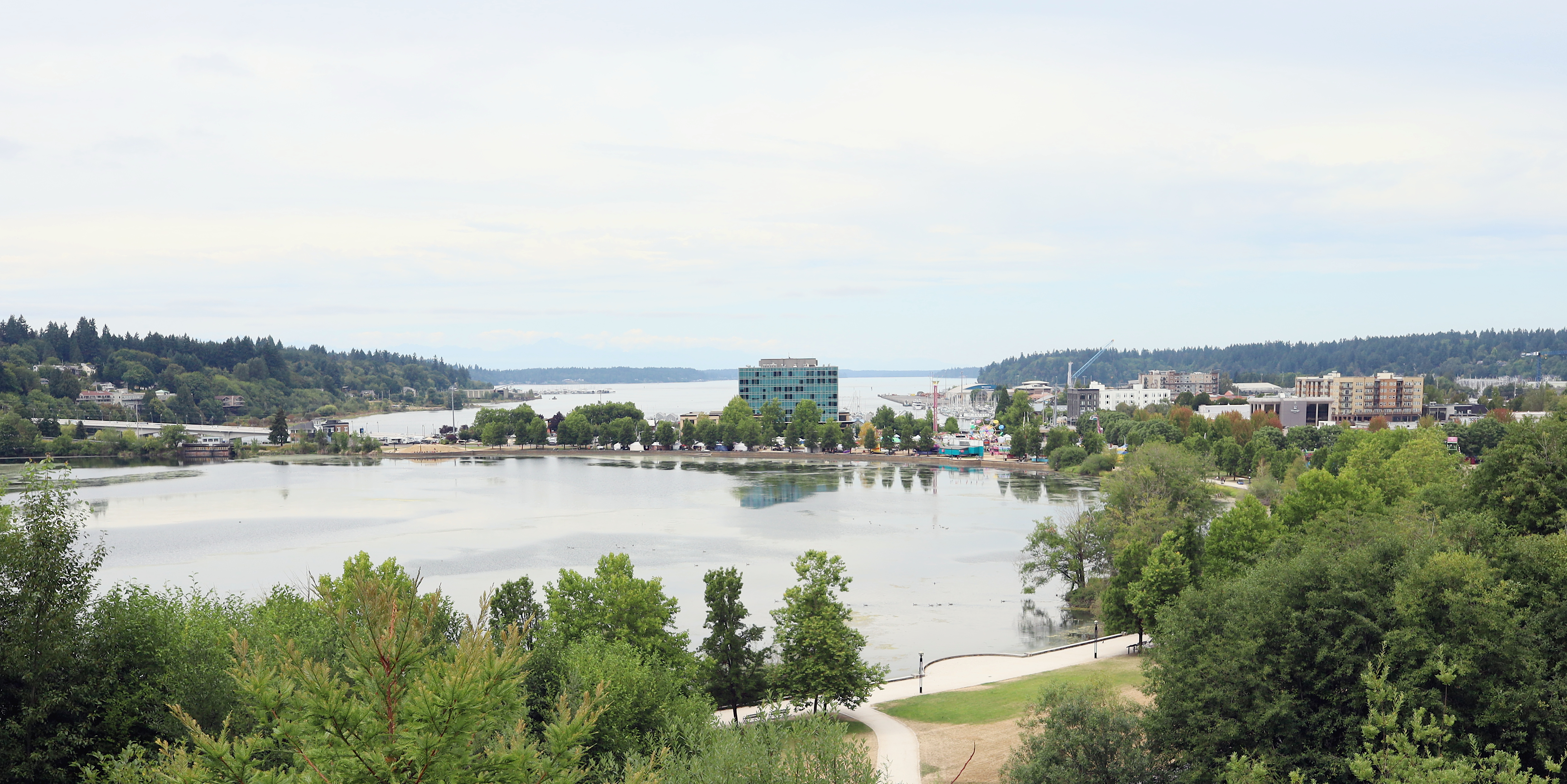
- Lakefair in 2025, seen from the Capitol campus
- Genre: 5-day community festival
- Date: 3rd week in July
- Frequency: Annual
- Venue: Heritage Park
- Locations: Capitol Lake, Olympia, Washington, USA
- Years active: 66
- Inaugurated: 1957
- Most recent: July 16–20, 2025
- Next event: July 2026
- Attendance: 200,000+
- Major events: 5 days of stage entertainment, arts-and-crafts vendor booths, non-profit/commercial food row booths, 50+ in the park, car show, parade, and fireworks
- Organiser: Capitalarians
- Filing status: 501(c)(3)
- People: Karen Adams-Griggs, co-President; Ken Ringering, co-President; Larrel O'Keefe, co-President
- Sponsors: Washington's Lottery, Les Schwab, Red Wind Casino, Olympia Federal, and more
- Website: www.lakefair.org

Capital Lakefair is an annual summer festival in Olympia, Washington. It is hosted by a registered 501(c)(3) non-profit organization of the same name. The event takes place at Heritage Park during the third weekend of July, ending on a Sunday night with a fireworks show over Capitol Lake.

The event was cancelled during the COVID-19 pandemic in 2020 and 2021.

== Organization ==
Capital Lakefair is a 501(c)(3) non-profit organization which has been tax-exempt since 2004. In 2023, it had $387,623 in revenue, $16,090 in net income and $188,272 in assets.

The festival is a volunteer driven organization governed by a voting member body known as the Capitalarians, a group of individuals that show their love and dedication to the people of Thurston County by donating their time and effort.

Each year as part of the Scholarship Ambassador Program (formerly the Royal Court), a new group of young women from area high schools join the Lakefair Scholarship Ambassador program tradition. The Scholarship Ambassadors participate in all aspects of the organization throughout the season. This includes local activities such as the donation drive by Bob Leingang Memorial Fish In, All Kids Win, American Cancer Society's Relay for Life, and events held by other area non-profit service groups. They also visit locations across Oregon, Washington, and British Columbia as the Lakefair Float rides in parades hosted by other community festivals. Each Scholarship Ambassador receives a $3,000 scholarship to be applied to any type of higher education, and the selected head ambassador receives an additional $2,000.

Funding for Capital Lakefair is provided by contributions from individuals and businesses in their community, local city/county lodging tax funds, grants, financial and/or in-kind donations by their sponsors and operations from the annual five-day festival in July.

Lakefair was established in 1957 to celebrate the community and continues to be the largest such event in the area.

== Scholarship program ==
The Royal Court tradition began with the first Lakefair in 1957, and the Scholarship Program was established years later in 1975 by Capitalarian Dee Hooper. It continues to be one of the most recognized scholarship programs in the Pacific Northwest and has awarded more than $500,000 in funding to date. The program is currently sponsored by their partners at Olympia Federal Savings.

Members of the Scholarship Ambassador Program participate in all aspects of Capital Lakefair throughout the season. It provides an educational opportunity for participants to learn about themselves, their community and prepare for higher education and adult life. In addition to local events, members visit communities around the Pacific Northwest from Oregon to British Columbia as they travel with the Lakefair Float to other festivals.

Each member of the Scholarship Ambassador Program receives a $3,000 scholarship, the Head Ambassador an additional $2,000, and remaining candidates $500 each. The funds may be applied to any form of higher education including a traditional degree, trade school or vocational training program.

The process begins with each participating school selecting a representative by December to become their candidate for the Scholarship Ambassador Program. In early February candidates take part in a one-day event that includes a panel discussion, individual interviews with 5 independent judges from the business community and a speech on a predetermined subject. Once complete three to six young women will be nominated at Coronation to serve on the Court, one of whom is named Lakefair Head Ambassador (formerly the Queen).
