= Spencer Allen (baseball) =

American baseball coach (born 1977)

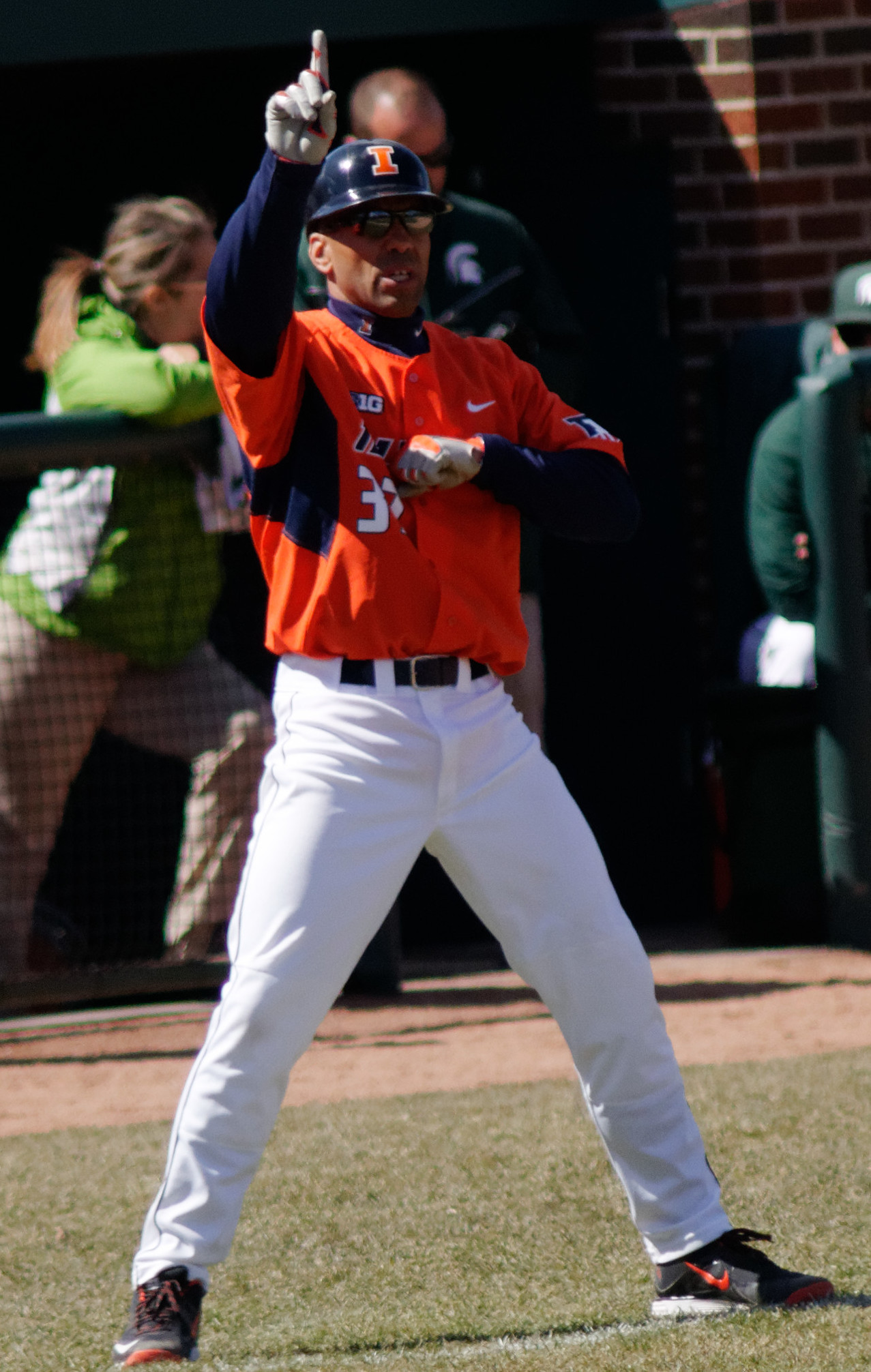
- Allen with Illinois in 2015

Milwaukee Brewers – No. 67
- Coach
- Born: December 10, 1977 (age 48); Olympia, Washington, U.S.
- Bats: Right Throws: Right

Teams
- Milwaukee Brewers (2026–present)

Career highlights and awards
- World Series champion (2026)

Spencer Allen (born December 10, 1977) is an American professional baseball coach who currently serves as the first base coach for the Milwaukee Brewers of Major League Baseball (MLB). He played college baseball at Green River College from 1997 to 1998 before transferring to Iowa State from 1999 to 2001 for head coach Lyle Smith. He then served as the head coach of the Northwestern Wildcats (2016–2021).

== Playing career ==
Allen attended Capital High School in Olympia, Washington. Allen played for the school's varsity baseball team for three years. He was named a First Team All-Conference selection as a sophomore while playing the outfield. Allen then enrolled at the Green River College, to play college baseball for the Green River Gators baseball team.

As a redshirt freshman in 1998, Allen was named a 2nd Team All-Northwest Athletic Association of Community Colleges.

In the 2000 season as a junior, Allen had a .258 batting average, a .333 on-base percentage (OBP), and a .315 SLG, with ten RBI.

Allen had his best season as a senior in 2001, hitting career highs in doubles (10), home runs (one), RBI (17), batting average (.267) and slugging (.360).

== Coaching career ==
=== College ===
Spencer Allen
Biographical details
- Born: December 10, 1977 (age 48); Olympia, Washington, U.S.

Playing career
- 1997–1998: Green River College
- 1999–2001: Iowa State
- Position: Second baseman

Coaching career (HC unless noted)
- 2002: Edmonds Community College (assistant)
- 2004: Iowa (volunteer assistant)
- 2005–2006: Creighton (assistant)
- 2008–2009: Purdue (assistant)
- 2010–2012: Washington State (assistant)
- 2013–2014: Creighton (assistant)
- 2015: Illinois (assistant)
- 2016–2021: Northwestern

Head coaching record
- Overall: 101–152

Allen was hired by Northwestern after serving as an assistant for Illinois. On May 31, 2021, Allen resigned as the head coach of Northwestern.

=== Professional ===
==== Milwaukee Brewers ====
Allen (left), as first base coach, speaks with Brewers player Sal Frelick during game 2 of the 2026 NLCS

Allen joined the Milwaukee Brewers organization prior to the 2022 season. On January 5, 2026, Allen was promoted to serve as the team's first base coach, replacing Julio Borbón.

== Head coaching record ==
Record table
Season	Team	Overall	Conference	Standing	Postseason
Northwestern Wildcats (Big Ten Conference) (2016–2021)
2016	Northwestern	15–39	7–17	10th	
2017	Northwestern	24–28	13–11	7th	Big Ten Tournament
2018	Northwestern	17–32	6–18	13th	
2019	Northwestern	24–26	11–12	9th	
2020	Northwestern	6–6	0–0		Season canceled due to COVID-19
2021	Northwestern	15–21	15–21	10th	
Northwestern:		101–152	52–79		
Total:		101–152			
National champion Postseason invitational champion Conference regular season champion Conference regular season and conference tournament champion Division regular season champion Division regular season and conference tournament champion Conference tournament champion
