= Capital Mall =

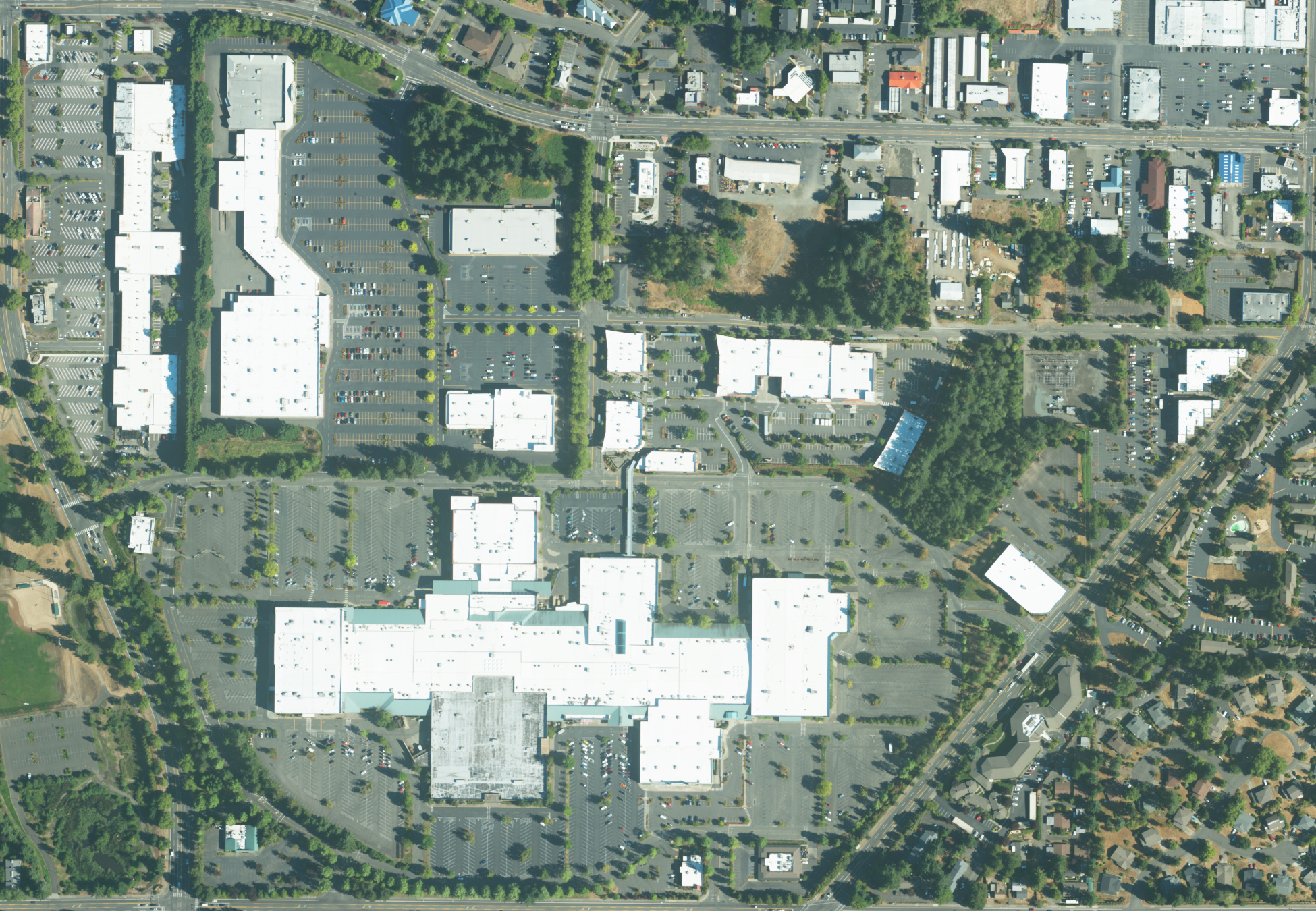
- Capital Mall and surrounding area in August 2023
- Location: Olympia, Washington, United States
- Coordinates: 47°02′31″N 122°56′08″W
- Address: 625 Black Lake Boulevard Olympia, WA 98502 U.S.
- Opened: October 5, 1978; 48 years ago
- Developer: The Hahn Company
- Manager: Pacific Retail Capital Partners
- Owner: Starwood Retail Partners (90%); U-R-Westfield (10%)
- Num. of stores: 106
- Floor area: 803,500 sq ft (74,650 m^{2}) (main retail area); 257,700 sq ft (23,940 m^{2}) (anchor retail area)
- Floors: 1 (2 in REI)
- Parking: 3,515 outdoor spaces
- Website: capitalmallolympia.com

Capital Mall is a shopping mall located in Olympia, Washington. The anchor stores are REI, Total Wine & More, Macy's, Dick's Sporting Goods, JCPenney, Best Buy, and Century Theatres. The mall was known as Westfield Capital from 1998 to 2013, when it was owned by the Westfield Group. In 2013, Starwood Capital Group purchased the mall and owned it until 2020; it is now managed by Pacific Retail Capital Partners.

In 2024, the Olympia City Council approved plans to develop the mall and surrounding area, known as the Capital Mall Triangle, into a high-density, walkable urban space; this allows certain buildings to be constructed up to 12 stories (130 feet (40 m)), will improve crosswalks and bike paths, and require additional stormwater mitigation systems.

== History ==
The grounds of Capital Mall were originally owned by the Yauger family which sold the land off in parcels, eventually becoming of use for the shopping complex, Capital High School, and Yauger Park. Capital Mall opened on October 5, 1978 and was developed by The Hahn Company. A 1978 article in The Spokesman-Review stated that Capital Mall was an integral factor in development of the city of Olympia. Concurrently with the mall, a number of retail developments and fast-food restaurants were also built around the mall. Construction of the mall required the city of Olympia to spend $3 million (equivalent to $14,808,673 in 2025) on road and traffic improvements, as the mall's development was predicted to more than triple the amount of traffic in the area.

The mall began with three anchor department stores: The Bon Marche, JCPenney, and Frederick and Nelson. Lamont's opened their 55,000 sq ft (5,100 m^{2}) store on April 17, 1980. J. C. Penney's store cost approx. $2.7 million (equivalent to $13,327,806 in 2025) to build and was designed by the Los Angeles, California firm of Burke Nicolais Archuleta. Frederick & Nelson was sold to Mervyns in 1992.

On August 18, 1991, a fire broke out on the mall's roof, causing over $3 million in damage. The mall was acquired in 1998 by Westfield America, Inc., a precursor of the Westfield Group, which renamed it "Westfield Shoppingtown Capital", dropping the "Shoppingtown" from the name in 2005. Upon acquisition by Westfield, it underwent a $50 million expansion and renovation. One facet of the expansion opened in 2002, when the vacated Lamonts store was replaced by a Best Buy and a food court.

Mervyns closed its 99,924 sq ft (9,283.2 m^{2}) store on December 31, 2006 and the space has since been divided into smaller sections: Forever 21 opened in August 2010, REI opened in May 2011, and Total Wine & More opened July 2013. Forever 21 closed permanently in September 2018. In October 2013, Westfield sold a controlling interest in several malls in the United States to Starwood Retail Partners, which included Capital Mall, for $1.6 billion. In October 2016, Dick's Sporting Goods opened a new store in the mall.

The Timberland Regional Library system opened a branch library in the mall in June 2021 as a pilot project to gauge demand in the western Olympia area. The library includes computers, book holds and returns, a children's area, and Wi-Fi.
