= Black Lake (Washington) =

Lake near Olympia in Washington State

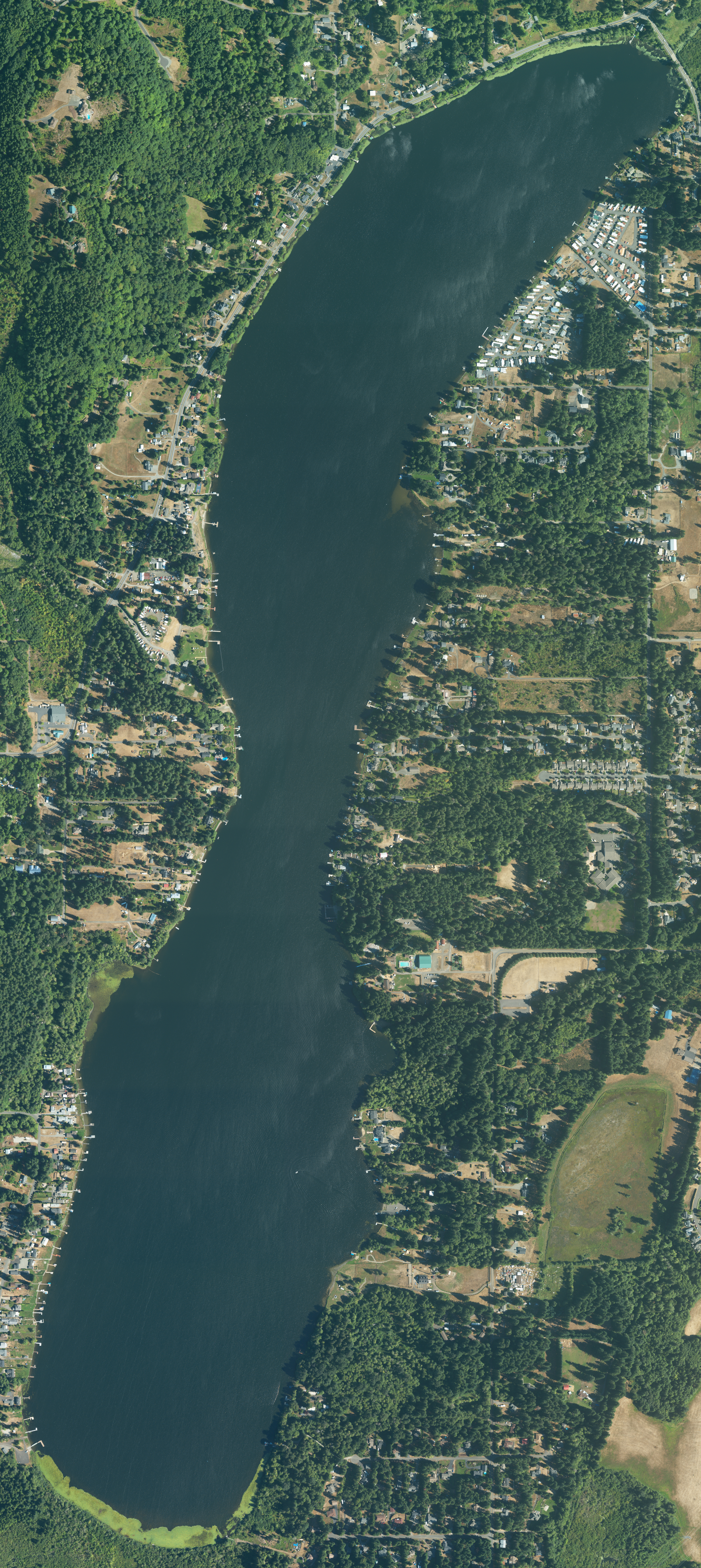
- Black Lake in August 2023
- Location: Near Lacey, Olympia, Tumwater
- Coordinates: 46°59′32.5″N 122°58′40.86″W
- Type: Lake
- River sources: Black River
- Ocean/sea sources: Pacific Ocean
- Surface area: 573.7 acres (232.2 ha)
- Average depth: 19 feet (5.8 m)
- Max. depth: 29 feet (8.8 m)
- Water volume: 11,000 acre-feet (14,000,000 m^{3})
- Shore length^{1}: 6 miles (9.7 km)
- Surface elevation: 130 ft (40 m)
- Settlements: Delphi; Olympia; Tumwater
- References: Geographic Names Information System: 1503407
- ^{1} Shore length is not a well-defined measure.

Black Lake is a lake located 4 miles (6.4 km) southwest of Olympia, Washington. With a surface area of 570 acres (2.3 km^{2}) and total volume of 11,000 acre-feet (14,000,000 m^{3}), it is one of the largest lakes in Thurston County.

The lake has two outflows: via the Black River, which drains southwest into the Chehalis River, thence to Gray's Harbor and the Pacific Ocean; and Percival Creek, which drains northeast into Capitol Lake, Budd Inlet and Puget Sound.

The lake's mean depth is 19 feet (5.8 m), with a maximum depth of 29 feet (8.8 m), and it has approximately 6 miles (9.7 km) of shoreline.

Black Lake was so named on account of the dark character of its water.

== History ==
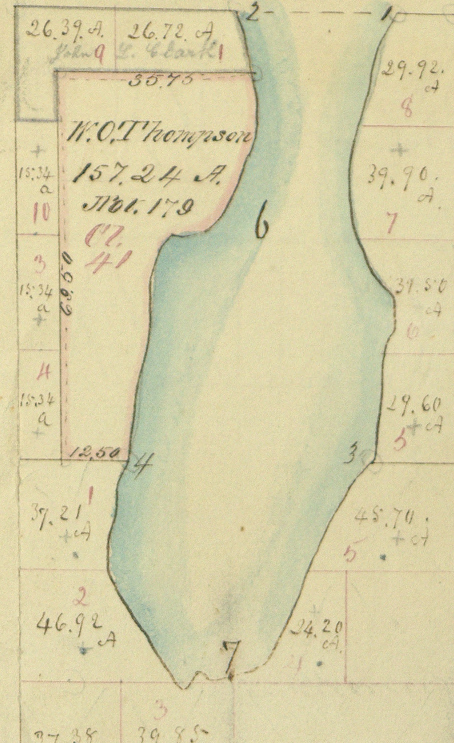
Thompson's 157 acre lot, 1863

One of the first settlers of the area was William Oaks Thompson (a.k.a. Black Lake Thompson), arriving from Cincinnati and setting up a home on the west shore of the lake in 1852. Thompson went on to develop the first road to Tumwater, a trail to Bush Prairie, and operated a scow ferry across the lake for travelers to Gate, Grand Mound, and Mima Prairie.

In 1922, Black Lake Ditch was created to connect Black River to Percival Creek. The straight ditch was constructed to help drain Black Lake and the surrounding wetlands. The ditch was estimated to lower the lake's water level by at least 5 feet (1.5 m) and drained agricultural parcels south of the lake.

== Ecology and environment ==
=== Ecology ===
Beaver dams on protected wildlife reserve parcels south of the lake restrict discharge and raise water levels by up to 4 feet (1.2 m), requiring regular county maintenance. The principal submersed species is the native water nymph; non-native eurasian watermilfoil was largely eradicated in 2006. Invasive plant species such as fragrant waterlily and yellow flag iris also restrict stream flow.

In 2006, logjams were built in Black Lake Ditch and in the stormwater wetland, Black Lake Meadows, near Mottman Industrial Park. Using trees and root balls that were removed from a local road project, the logjams were to help increase the migration and spawning grounds for coho and Chinook salmon, steelhead and cutthroat trout.

=== Environment ===
The lake is considered eutrophic and requires ongoing herbicide treatment, including the use of aluminium sulfate, glyphosate, imazapyr, triclopyr, and diquat dibromide. Filtered runoff gathered at Yauger Park water retention ponds in West Olympia is released into Black Lake Ditch. The naturally cleaned waters run from Percival Creek to Capitol Lake and eventually into the Salish Sea.

In September 2000, a significant algae bloom of Aphanizomenon and/or Anabaena cyanobacteria covered the western portion of the lake, restricting recreation activity. Smaller blooms took place in 1992 and 1994, and again in October 2011. In September 2011, microcystin was discovered at the lake, at a concentration requiring an advisory to avoid contact with lake water; and again in 2021.

In 2021, a survey of local pollution discovered three streams which introduced effluent from nearby septic systems into the lake. Thurston County officials inspected more than 500 parcels which drain to the lake; 200 septic systems in the area were overdue on required maintenance.

== Recreation ==
The lake's freshwater beach is accessible through Kenneydell Park, which offers a public dock, picnic and swimming areas. The 41-acre (17 ha) public park features over 1,000 feet (304.8 m) of waterfront.

Thurston County has maintained an undeveloped 53-acre (21 ha) parcel on the western shore of Black Lake known as Guerin Park. Purchased by the county in 1976, the site contains 1,180 foot (360 m) shoreline. Development of the grounds has been prevented due to wetland areas throughout the park. The Tumwater Historical Society proposed a museum at the site, focusing on the historical pioneer roots around the region. The build of a rowing club was also proffered.

== See also ==
- Deschutes River
- Barnes Lake
- List of geographic features in Thurston County, Washington
- Trosper Lake
