= Capitol Lake =

Artificially created body of water at Washington State Capitol

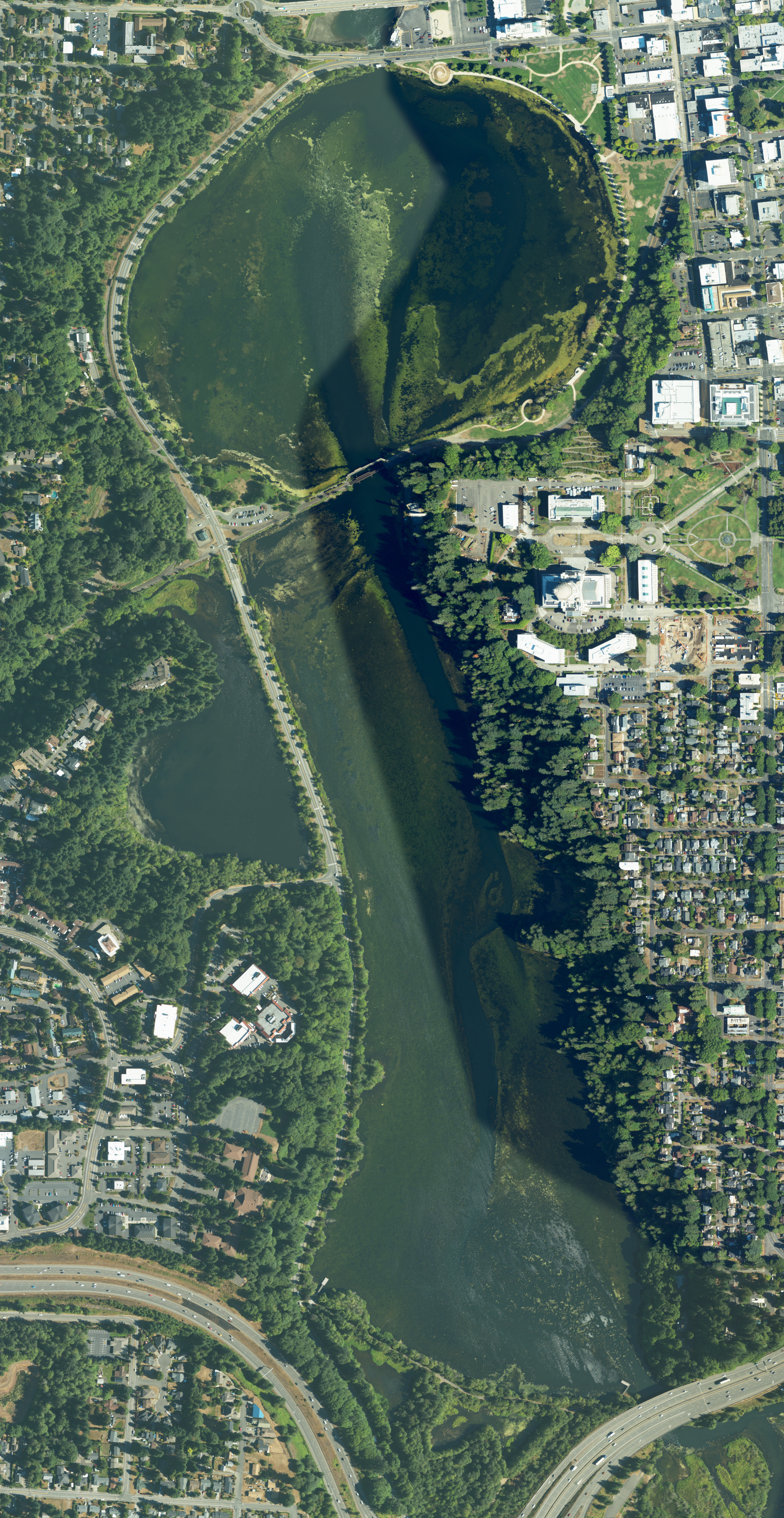
- Capitol Lake in August 2023
- Location: Olympia / Tumwater, Washington, United States
- Coordinates: 47°1′59.81″N 122°54′31.58″W
- Type: Artificial lake, Formerly wetlands and estuary
- Primary inflows: Deschutes River
- Primary outflows: Budd Inlet
- Max. length: 3 km (1.9 mi)
- Surface area: 260 acres (1.1 km^{2})
- Settlements: Tumwater, Olympia

Capitol Lake is a 3-kilometer (1.9 mile) long, 260-acre (1.1 km^{2}) artificial lake at the mouth of the Deschutes River in Tumwater/Olympia, Washington. The Olympia Brewery sits on Capitol Lake in Tumwater, just downstream from where the Tumwater Falls meet the artificial lake. The Washington State Department of Enterprise Services (DES) manages the lake, as part of The Washington State Capitol Campus.

== History ==
=== 19th century ===
Prior to American settlement, the tidal basin at the southern tip of Budd Inlet was a productive shellfish gathering area for native peoples. The area was of specific value to the Squaxin Island Tribe who inhabited the original estuary for millennia. After settlement in the mid-19th century, the basin received much of the wastewater and other effluent outflow from "uptown" Olympia. In the 1890s, the Northern Pacific Railroad located a station and switching yard on the eastern shore of the basin.

The first proposal to create Capitol Lake came when Leopold Schmidt of the Olympia Brewing Company proposed in 1895 to " mak(e) a freshwater lake of it by building a dam and locks near the Westside (Olympia) bridge."

=== 1900–1950 ===
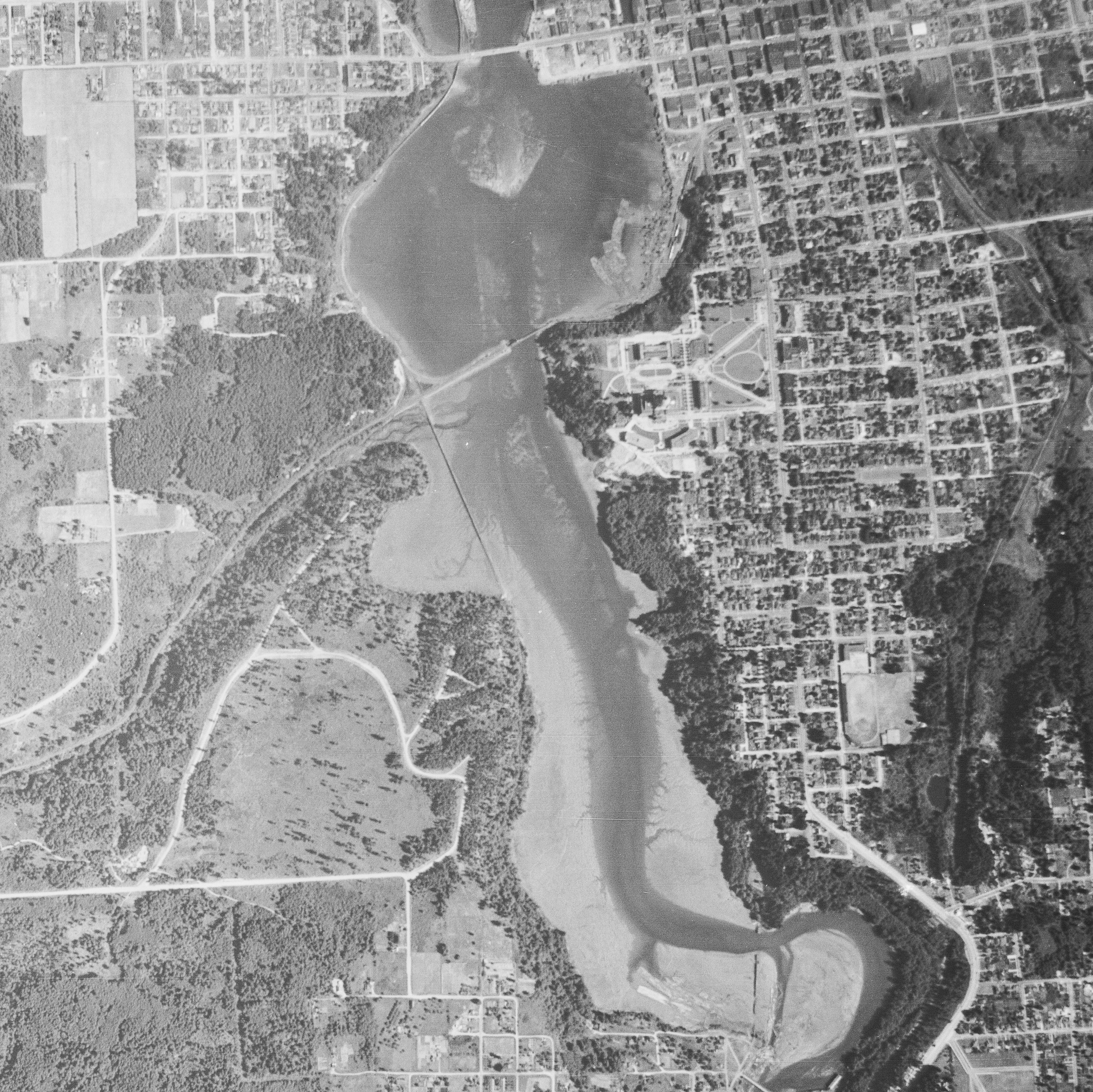
Capitol Lake in July 1941

In 1911, the State Capitol Commission held a nationwide competition for the design of the State Capitol Campus. The winning architects, Wilder and White, submitted a revolutionary City Beautiful movement and American Renaissance plan which included creating a body of water to reflect the Capitol Group of buildings on the bluff by installing a tide lock at the mouth of the Deschutes River.

A more limited lake was also part of the original landscape design by John Olmsted to reflect the Washington State Capitol building on Puget Sound. The lake as envisioned by Olmsted would have been created with a north to south running berm, as opposed to an east -to-west-running dam.

In 1915, the State Capitol Commission rejected a plan by former Olympia Mayor and state legislator Phillip H. Carlyon to replace Olympia's bridge to the Westside with a dam and locks. That plan would have created a lake very much like the present Capitol Lake. Because of opposition from upriver Tumwater businesses, such as the Olympia Brewing Company and the Olympia Power and Light Company, that plan was not approved.

The Capitol Group of buildings was constructed over several years from 1913 to 1940, and the State Capitol Committee then turned to the task of creating the Wilder and White reflecting Capitol Lake. In 1937, the state began purchasing the privately owned tidelands around the Capitol Campus. In 1941, opposition from Tumwater was finally overcome during a special town meeting. In 1947, due in large part by intense lobbying by Thurston County legislators, the state legislature approved funding for the construction of the dam in order to create Capitol Lake.

A shantytown known as "Little Hollywood" developed along the shores of the Deschutes River, at the foot of the Capitol Campus. The people living in the shanties dumped raw human waste and trash directly into the Deschutes River. This became an eyesore (July 7, 1948, The Daily Olympian) and probably a health hazard. Damming the Deschutes River destroyed the estuary, but also prevented the urban blight of the shantytown from recurring.

=== 1950–2000 ===
Capitol Lake was created in 1951 when the dam, known as the Fifth Avenue Dam, was completed consistent with the Wilder and White plan. This allowed for the retention of the outflow from the Deschutes River to cover the tide flats.

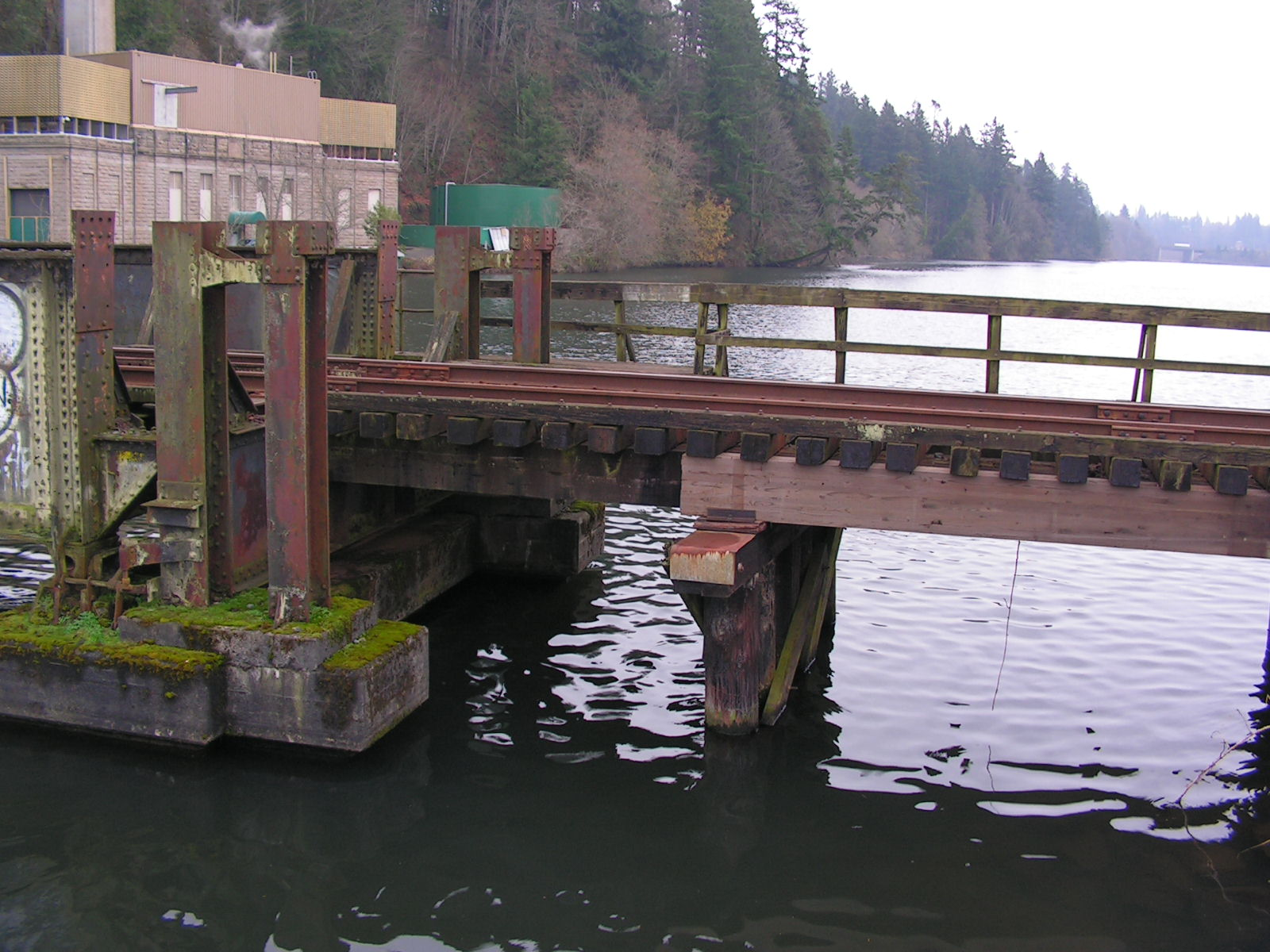
Railroad bridge crossing Capitol Lake.

Due to an increase in bacterial levels, swimming in the lake was banned beginning in the 1980s. In the 1990s and 2000s, the North Capitol Campus Heritage Park was created with the Arc of Statehood from the Western Washington Inlet to the Eastern Washington Butte along the eastern edge of Capitol Lake and the North Campus trail and Law Enforcement Memorial with views across Capitol Lake to the borrowed landscapes of Puget Sound and the Olympic Mountains.

=== 21st century ===
The February 2001 Nisqually earthquake did considerable damage to the 4th Avenue Bridge just north of the lake, as well as to the Deschutes Parkway on the west side of the lake.

== Estuary restoration ==
As Capitol Lake replaced the Deschutes River estuary the area underwent a high rate of siltation. The lake was dredged periodically to keep it from filling in, potentially offsetting eutrophication. Along with sediment issues and an introduction of an invasive species, poor water quality became an issue due to bacterial levels, causing the lake to be closed to swimmers for several decades.

In 2009, after 12 years of intensive and independently verified scientific study, members of the Capitol Lake Adaptive Management Plan (CLAMP) Steering Committee reached a consensus regarding the Department of Natural Resource's efforts to remove the 5th Avenue Dam and restore Deschutes Estuary. A finalized report, in agreement with other government departments, several Thurston County Commissioners, and the Squaxin Island Tribe, officially recommended the Capitol Lake Basin be returned to an estuary.

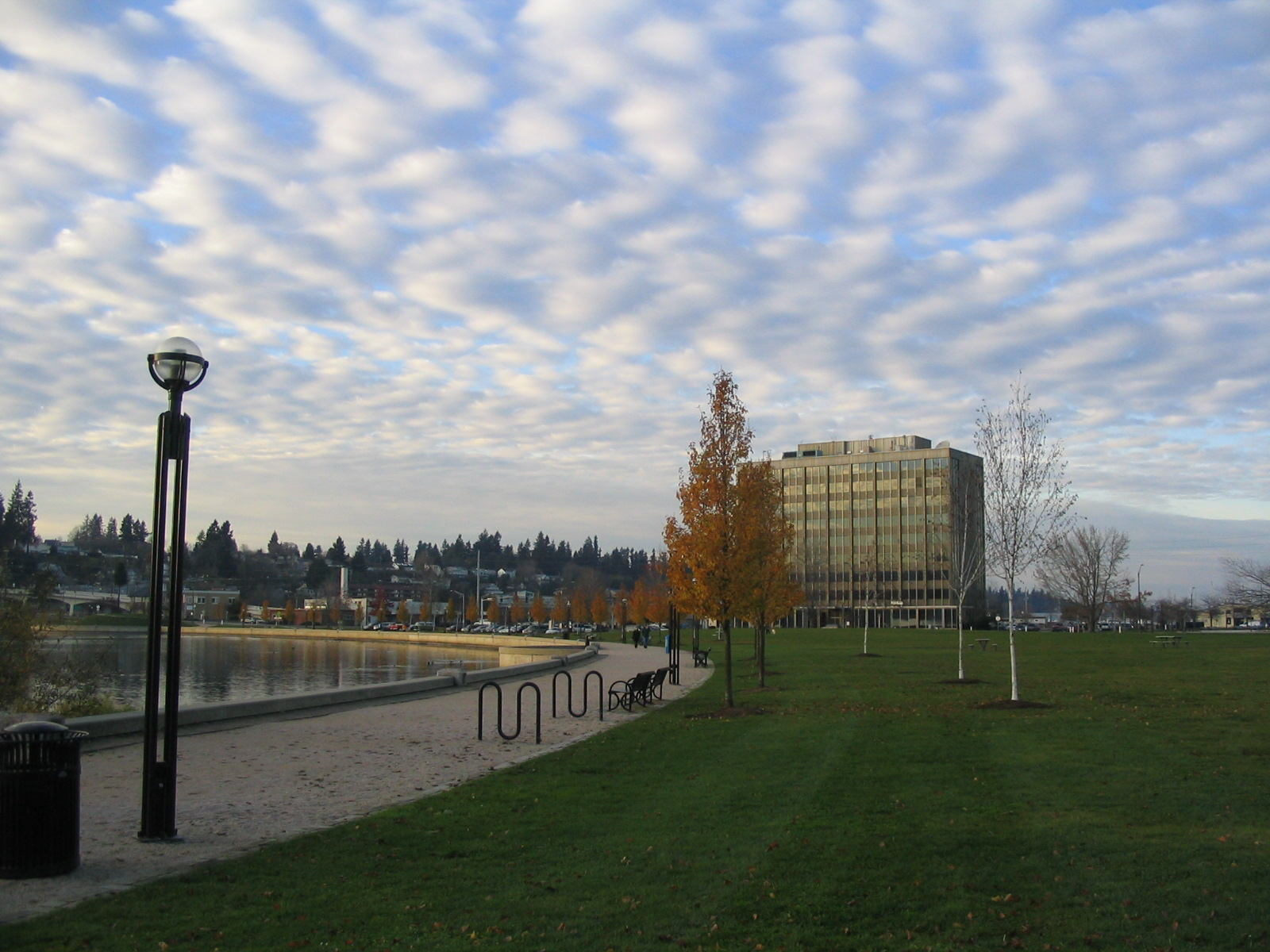
Looking north along Capitol Lake.

After a 25-year hiatus, in 2011 the State Legislature appropriated $200,000 in order to seek permits to reimplement maintenance dredging in order to retain and improve Capitol Lake as part of the historic Wilder and White design of the State Capitol Campus during its centennial year. The Washington State Department of Ecology released a report in 2012 that studied several areas of concern for the Deschutes River, Capitol Lake, and Budd Inlet, including bacterial and oxygen levels, sediment, and temperature. A 2022 report noted an accumulation of an additional 35,000 cubic yards of sediment per year.

In 2023, the state legislature authorized $7 million to the DES to officially begin efforts to restore the area to an estuary. The project is estimated to cost between $137 million to $247 million and the restoration may possibly provide an increase of salmon spawning within the watershed.

=== Opposition ===
Resistance from community members and government officials is based on concerns that the Capitol Lake restoration would remove a local landmark and that the loss of the dam would remove a flood control mechanism for the area. Along with budgetary concerns, additional issues cited are the potential loss of economic activity on the waterfront and doubts that the water quality would improve.

In response to the 2009 report, CLAMP noted that an invasive species, the New Zealand Mud Snail found within the lake, are recorded at such high quantities that their potential to cause "unpredictable environmental degradation" suggests that their release into the Southern region of the Puget Sound should be avoided at all costs.

== Environment and ecology ==
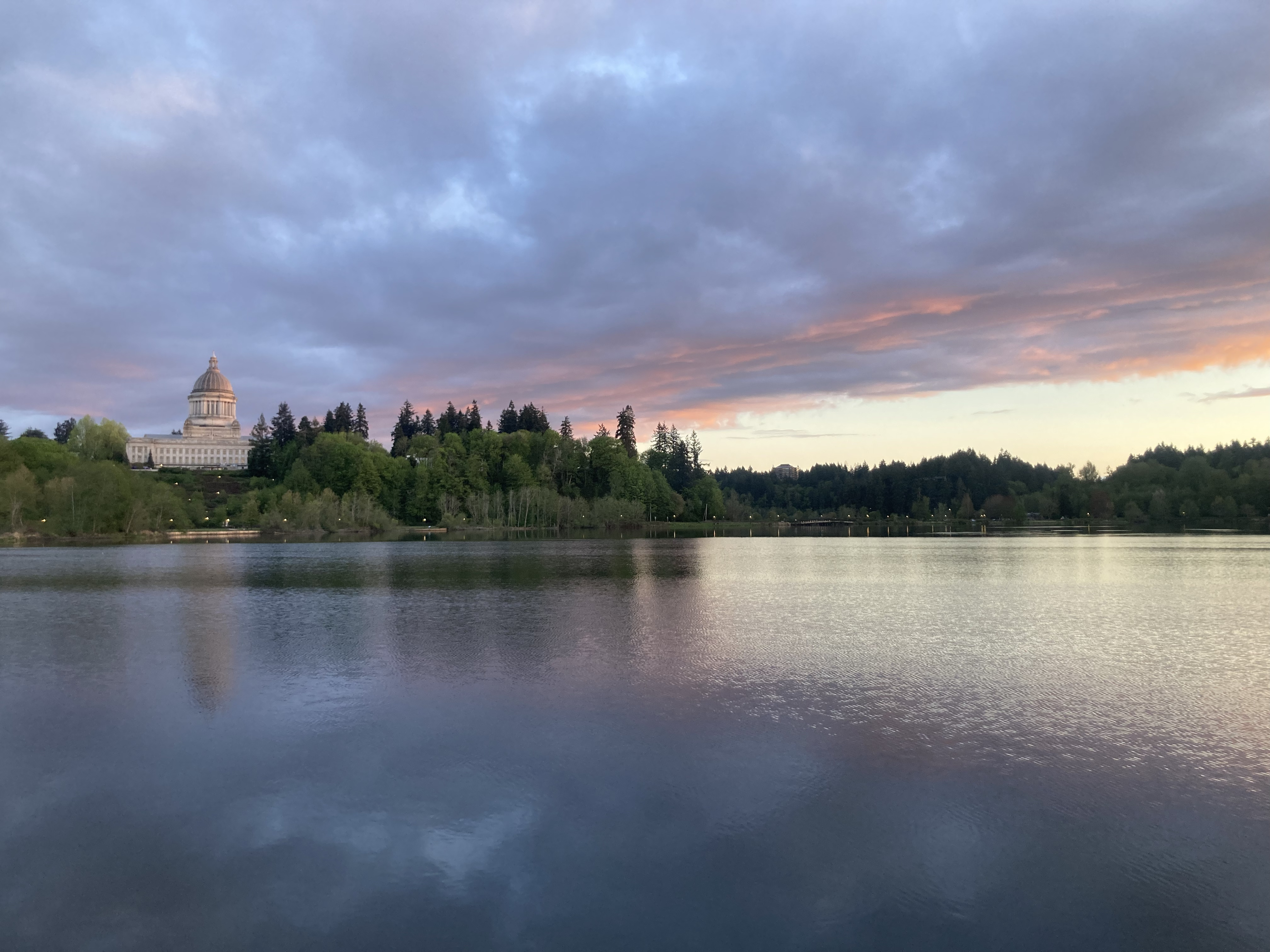
Washington State Capitol and Capitol Lake at sunset

Filtered runoff gathered at Yauger Park's water retention pond complex in West Olympia is released into Black Lake Ditch and Percival Creek, eventually reaching Capitol Lake before the naturally cleaned waters reach Budd Inlet.

=== Invasive species ===
In 2009, the New Zealand mud snail (Potamopyrgus antipodarum), an invasive species the size of a grain of rice, was discovered in Capitol Lake. The lake has been closed to all public use, including boating and other recreation, since 2009. A heavy cold snap in 2013, combined with a drawdown in water level in preparation, was roughly estimated to have killed 40–60% of the mudsnail population.

An infestation of Eurasian milfoil was controlled using herbicide in 2004. Later efforts relied on scuba divers to remove this invasive plant.

== Recreation ==
Heritage Park, a 24-acre public park bordered by the Washington State Capitol and downtown, features two trails around the lake and connect other paths.

Trails around Washington State Capitol Campus and Capitol Lake
Name	Length (in miles)	Description
North Basin Shoreline Trail and Sidewalk Loop	1.5	Circle path around the lake
Heritage Park Perimeter Road and Sidewalk Loop	1.7	Circle path around the lake, following outer Eastern sidewalks
Heritage Park Hillside Trail	0.5	Winding path up and down from Capitol campus
Marathon Park to Lakeridge Drive	0.4	Marathon Park (SW corner of lake) South to intersection
Lakeridge Dr to Interpretive Center	0.4	Intersection to Interpretive Center along Western edge of the lake
Interpretive Center to Fishing Dock	0.3	East from Interpretive Center along Southern edge of thelake
Fishing Dock to Interpretive Center	0.9	Across highways and back North to Interpretive Center

Capital Lakefair, centered on the lake, is held annually in July.

As of 2023, no boating or swimming activities are allowed within the lake.

== See also ==
- History of Olympia, Washington
- List of geographic features in Thurston County, Washington
- Olympia Downtown Historic District
- Parks and recreation in Olympia, Washington
