= Julio Borbón =

American baseball player (born 1986)

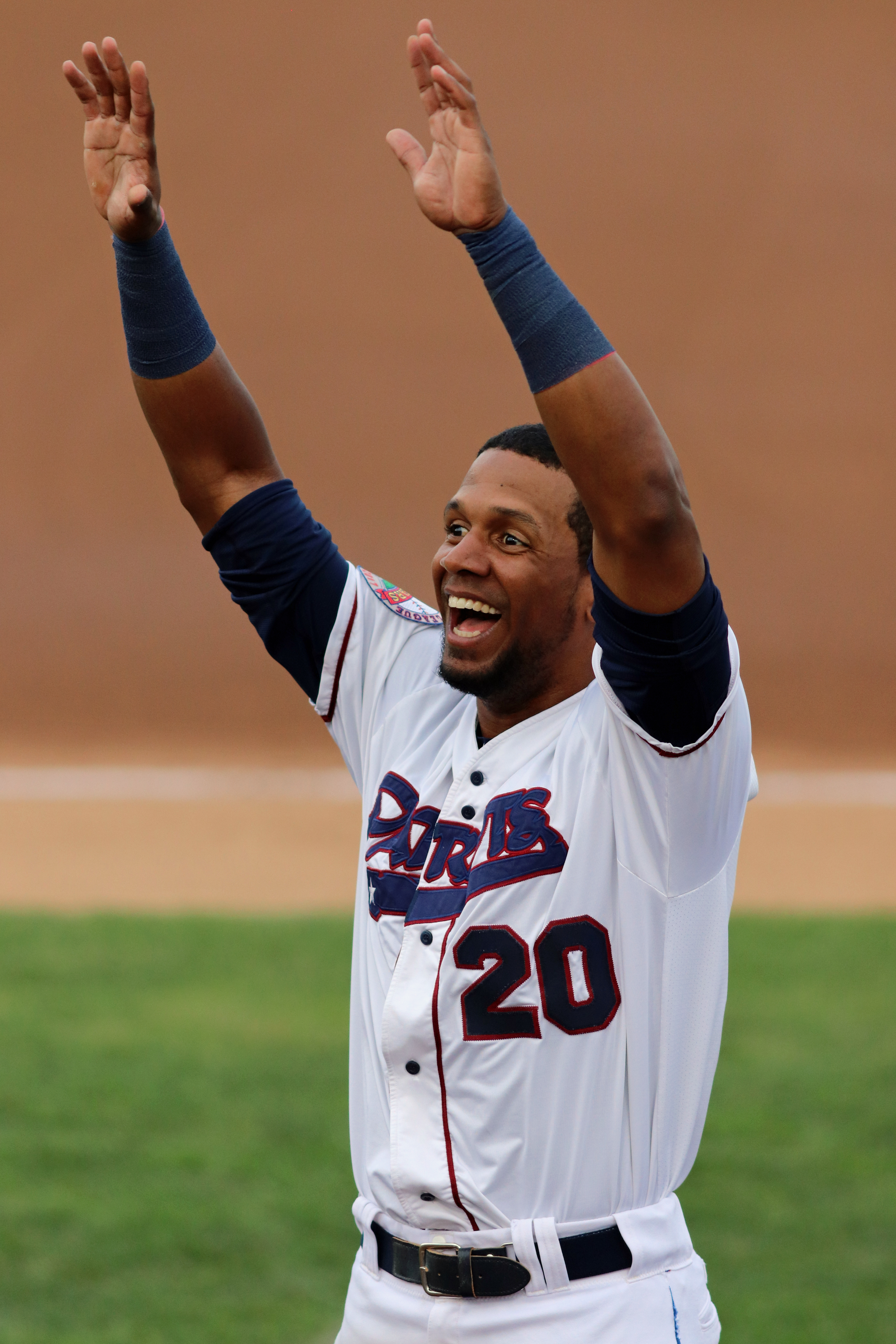
- Borbón with the Somerset Patriots
- Center fielder / Coach
- Born: February 20, 1986 (age 40); Starkville, Mississippi, U.S.
- Batted: Left Threw: Left

MLB debut
- June 29, 2009, for the Texas Rangers

Last MLB appearance
- August 27, 2016, for the Baltimore Orioles

MLB statistics
- Batting average: .273
- Home runs: 8
- Runs batted in: 76
- Stats at Baseball Reference

Teams
- As player: Texas Rangers (2009–2011, 2013); Chicago Cubs (2013); Baltimore Orioles (2016); As coach: Milwaukee Brewers (2025)
Medals
Men's baseball
Representing United States
World University Championship
Gold medal – first place	2006 Havana	Team

Julio Alberto Borbón (born February 20, 1986) is an American former professional baseball center fielder who most recently served as the first base coach for the Milwaukee Brewers of Major League Baseball (MLB). He played in MLB for the Texas Rangers, Chicago Cubs, and Baltimore Orioles.

== College career ==
Borbón attended the University of Tennessee. In 2005, Borbón helped the Volunteers reach the College World Series and was third on the team with a .350 batting average. His teammates that year included former major leaguers Chase Headley of the San Diego Padres and Luke Hochevar of the Kansas City Royals. After the 2005 season, he played collegiate summer baseball with the Cotuit Kettleers of the Cape Cod Baseball League. Borbon led the Volunteers with a .366 batting average and 19 stolen bases in 2006 and in 2007, his final season, had a .345 batting average.

== Professional career ==
=== Texas Rangers ===
Entering the 2007 Major League Baseball draft, Borbón was ranked the 19th-best overall prospect by Baseball America. In the draft, he was taken in the supplemental round by the Texas Rangers as the 35th overall pick.

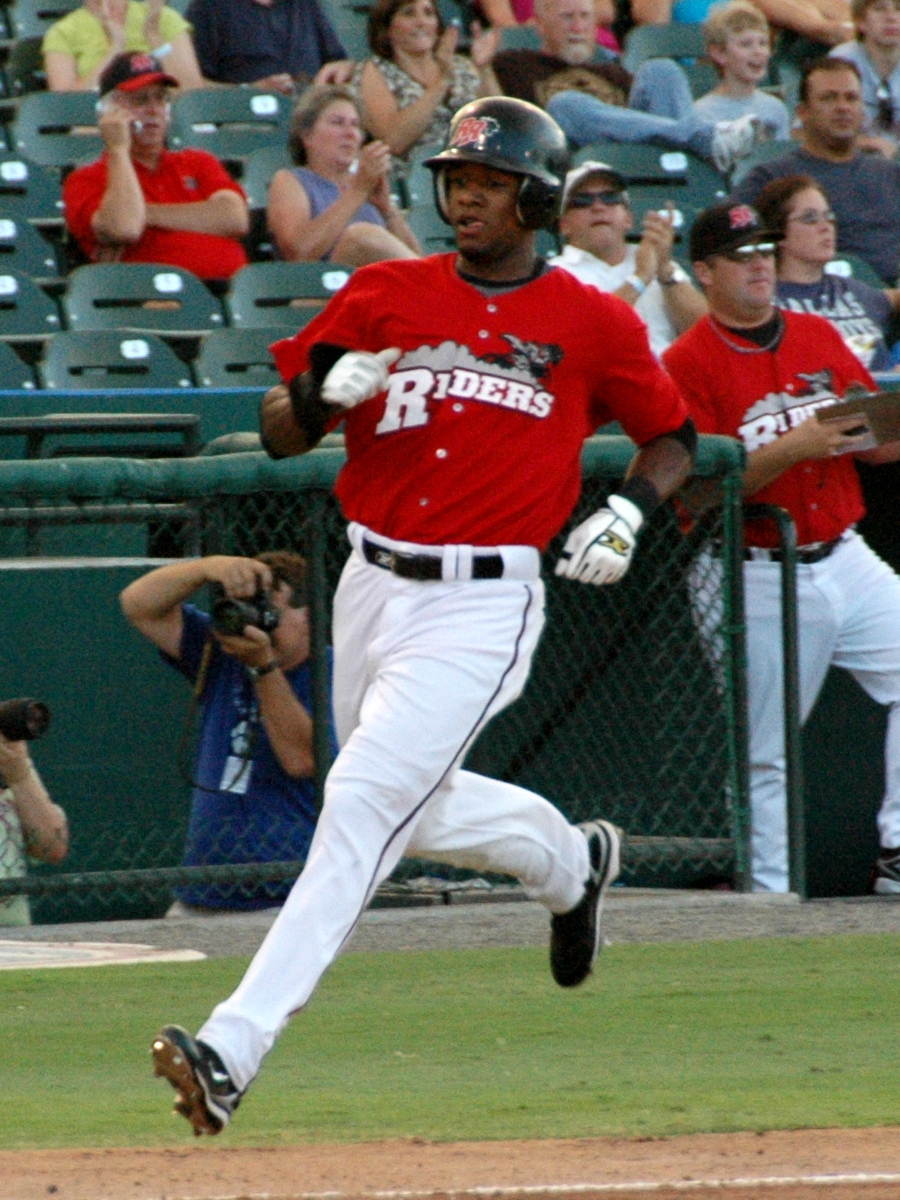
Borbon playing for the Frisco RoughRiders in 2008.

On August 16, 2007, Borbón signed a four-year major league contract worth $1.3 million, with a $800,000 signing bonus. Because he was signed to a major league contract, Borbón was placed on the Rangers 40-man roster and was optioned to the Single-A Spokane Indians. At Spokane, he played in 7 games and had a .172 batting average. He was then sent to play rookie ball for the Surprise Rangers and played two games for them.

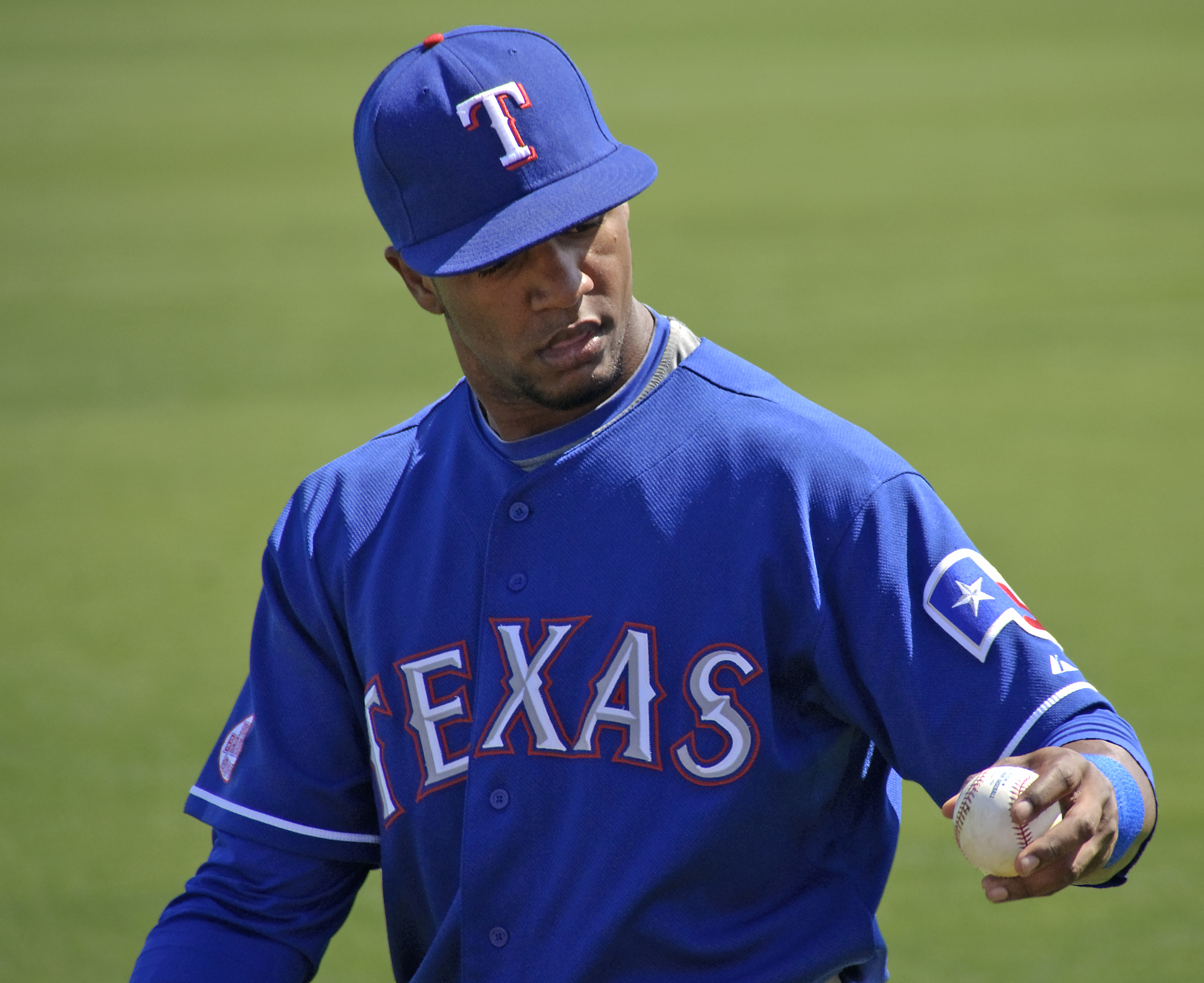
Borbon with the Texas Rangers in 2010

On June 29, 2009, Borbón made his major league debut with the Rangers. He hit his first major league home run on August 20 of that year. On September 8, he had his first multi-homer game in an 11–9 win over the Cleveland Indians.

=== Chicago Cubs ===
On April 19, 2013, the Chicago Cubs claimed Borbón off waivers. He was designated for assignment on August 2, 2013.

=== Baltimore Orioles ===
Borbón was selected by the Baltimore Orioles in the Triple–A phase of the Rule 5 draft on December 12, 2013. He was assigned to the Triple–A Norfolk Tides to begin the 2014 season, ultimately playing in 124 games and hitting .288/.342/.356 with five home runs, 44 RBI, and 34 stolen bases.

On February 14, 2015, Borbón re-signed with the Orioles organization on a minor league contract. He returned to Triple-A Norfolk, making 114 appearances and batting .269/.300/.321 with one home run, 28 RBI, and 23 stolen bases. Borbón elected free agency following the season on November 6.

On March 12, 2016, Borbón re-signed with the Orioles on a minor league contract. His contract was selected from the Double-A Bowie Baysox when the Orioles placed Hyun-soo Kim on the 15-day disabled list on July 19, 2016. Borbón made his first appearance in an MLB game in three years as an eighth-inning defensive substitute for center fielder Adam Jones in a 5–0 loss to the New York Yankees at Yankee Stadium on August 20. He made his first start with the Orioles in center field the next day, getting a single in three at bats and scoring a run in a 4–1 victory over the Yankees. On August 31, Borbón was removed from the 40-man roster and sent outright to Triple-A Norfolk.

=== Acereros de Monclova ===
On April 11, 2017, Borbón signed with the Acereros de Monclova of the Mexican League. In 55 games for Monclova, he batted .351/.408/.449 with two home runs, 22 RBI, and eight stolen bases.

=== Pericos de Puebla ===
Borbón was traded to the Pericos de Puebla on July 1, 2017. In 35 appearances for Puebla, he slashed .390/.457/.504 with three home runs, 15 RBI, and 12 stolen bases. Borbón became a free agent following the season.

=== Somerset Patriots ===
On April 2, 2018, Borbón signed with the Somerset Patriots of the Atlantic League of Professional Baseball. In 56 games for Somerset, he batted .301/.363/.454 with five home runs, 33 RBI, and 19 stolen bases.

=== Sultanes de Monterrey ===
On July 17, 2018, Borbón signed with the Sultanes de Monterrey of the Mexican League. In 42 games for Monterrey, he hit .301/.386/.399 with four home runs, 20 RBI, and 16 stolen bases.

Borbón announced his retirement from professional baseball on March 1, 2019.

== Post-playing career ==
=== New York Yankees ===
On March 1, 2019, Borbón announced that he joined the New York Yankees organization as a coach. In his first year, he served as a defensive coach for the Scranton/Wilkes-Barre RailRiders, with a focus on baserunning, outfield, and bunting instruction. In 2020, he moved into a new position as a defensive coach for the Gulf Coast League Yankees, but the season was later canceled due to the COVID-19 pandemic. In 2021, Borbón stayed with the team, now re-named the Florida Complex League Yankees, and was promoted to manager.

=== Minnesota Twins ===
On January 30, 2022, Borbón announced he was leaving the Yankees and accepted a position with the Minnesota Twins in their player development department.

=== Milwaukee Brewers ===
On December 17, 2024, the Milwaukee Brewers hired Borbón to serve as their first base coach. On January 5, 2026, the Brewers hired Spencer Allen as their new first base coach, announcing that Borbón would remain in the organization in an unspecified capacity.

On February 4, 2026, Borbón was announced as a special advisor to player development and scouting for the organization.

== Personal ==
Borbón was born in Mississippi while his father attended Mississippi State University. He is of Dominican descent. He attended high school at De La Salle in Santo Domingo, Dominican Republic, graduating in 2004. After high school he attended the University of Tennessee on a baseball scholarship. He left Tennessee after his junior year and was taken by the Texas Rangers with the 35th pick in the 2007 MLB draft. His brother, Edwin Borbón, played college baseball at Trevecca Nazarene University prior to his first two years at Tennessee junior college, Chattanooga State.

== See also ==
- Rule 5 draft results
