= Olympia School District =

School district in Washington, United States

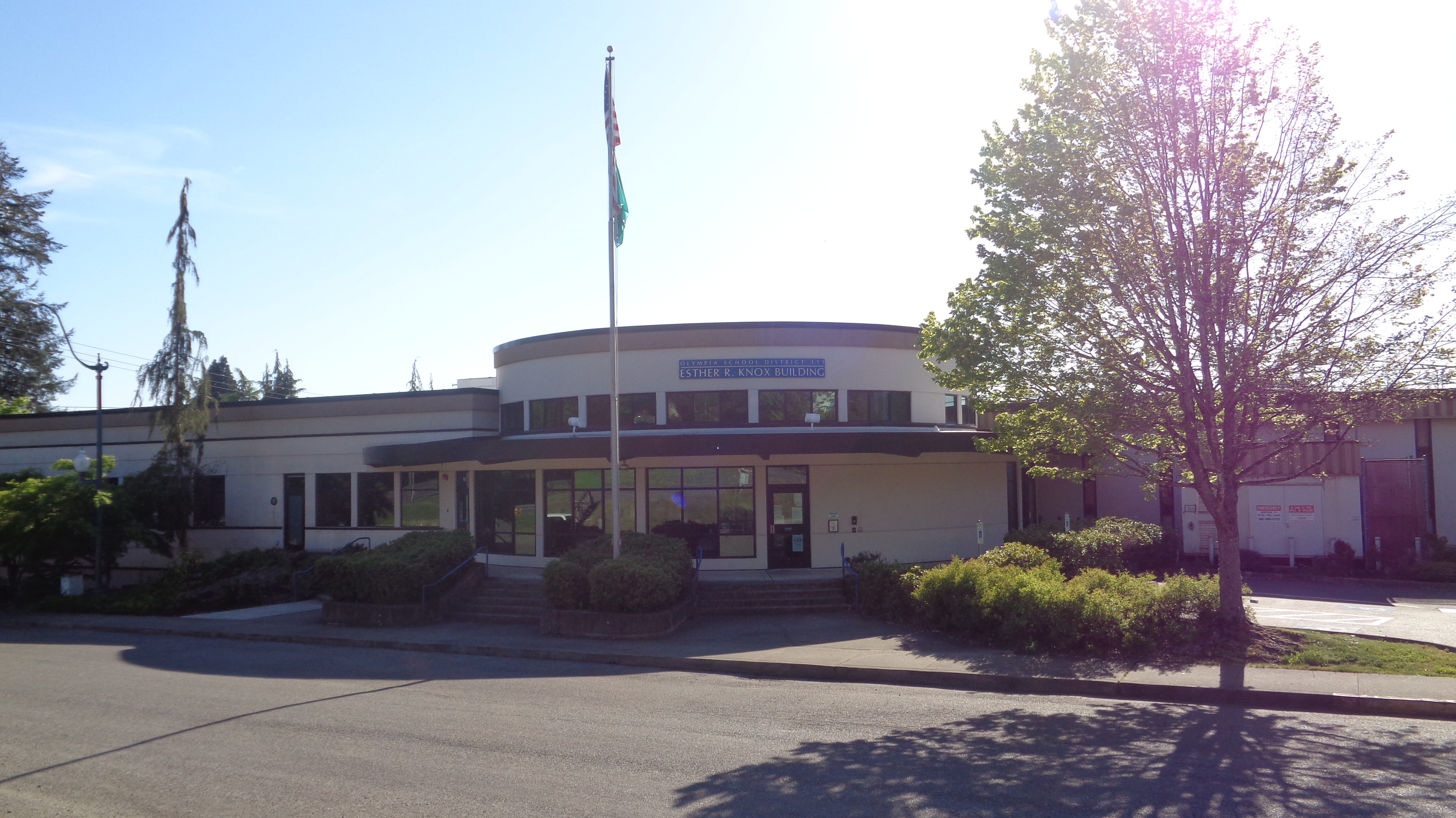
- OSD No. 111 Administration Office; Esther R. Knox Building

Address
- 111 Bethel St NE Olympia, Washington, 98501; United States

District information
- Type: Public
- Grades: Pre-K through 12
- Established: July 1, 1966; 59 years ago
- Superintendent: Dr. Patrick Murphy
- NCES District ID: 5306180

Students and staff
- Students: 9,666
- Teachers: 563
- Student–teacher ratio: 17.16

Other information
- Website: osd.wednet.edu

Olympia School District No. 111 is a public school district in Thurston County, Washington, including the City of Olympia.

In the 2025-26 school year, Olympia School District had a student enrollment of 9,666 across 19 campuses.

== History ==
=== Establishment ===
The area presently served by Olympia School District No. 111 was historically divided into 10 unique grade school districts. Beginning around 1910, these districts gradually began consolidation efforts, with the final consolidation that formed the present day Olympia School District No. 111 occurring in 1966. Known consolidations are listed below.

Election Date	Component Districts	Resulting District	Formation Date
c. 1910	McLane School District #4; Cedar Flats School District #64	McLane School District #76	-
August 20, 1914	School District #39; School District #77	Boston Harbor School District #302	-
August 21, 1922	Plainview School District #73; McLane School District #76	McLane School District #314	-
March 2, 1929	Olympia School District #1; Butler's Cove School District #56	Olympia School District #318	July 1, 1929
March 1, 1930	Gull Harbor School District #37; Olympia School District #318	Olympia School District #320	July 1, 1930
June 8, 1940	Summit Lake School District #32; McLane School District #314	McLane School District #328	July 1, 1940
February 4, 1950	Hays School District #3; Olympia School District #320	Olympia School District #1	July 1, 1950
March 10, 1964	Olympia School District #1; Boston Harbor School District #302	Olympia School District #11	July 1, 1964
June 14, 1966	Olympia School District #11; McLane School District #328	Olympia School District #111	July 1, 1966

== Schools ==
High Schools (Grades 9-12)
High School	Grade Levels/Type	Established	Enrollment (2020)	Mascot	WIAA Classification	Notes	Principals
Avanti	alternative	1996	142	Boxers	n/a		Michael Velasquez
Capital	comprehensive 9-12	1975	1367	Cougars	3A	Hosts students from Griffin School District.	Lil Hunter
OlympiaW	comprehensive 9-12	1907	1890	Bears	4A	Also known as William Winlock Miller High School	Matt Grant

Middle Schools (Grades 6-8)
Name	Grade Levels/Type	Established	Enrollment (2020)	Mascot	Principal
Jefferson	6-8	1961	467	Jaguars	Michael Hart
Marshall	6-8	1994	415	Mustangs	Anthony Brock
Reeves	6-8	1970	414	Raiders	Aaron Davis
Washington	6-8		787	Bulldogs	Paul Anders

Elementary Schools (Grades K-5)
Name	Grades	Established	Enrollment (2018)	Mascot	Principal	Remarks
Boston Harbor	K-5	1964*	184	Bruins	Jen Brotherton	*1900s as part of Boston Harbor school district, 1964 as officially part of OSD
Centennial	K-5	1989	484	Stars	Shannon Ritter	Replaced McKinley Elementary
Garfield	K-5	1852*	348	Cheetahs	Brendon Chertok	*1852 as Westside school, 1902 as Garfield School
Julia Butler Hansen	K-5	1994	479	Hawks	William (Billy) Harris	"Hansen". Hosts alternative HAP program.
Leland P. Brown	K-5	1965	331	Eagles	Sean Shaughnessy	"L.P. Brown"
Abraham Lincoln	K-5	1859	270	Lions	Marcela Abadi	Hosts the district's alternative Options Program
James Madison	K-5		243	Lion Cubs	Domenico Spatola-Knoll	
Margaret McKenny	K-5		349	Hawks	Michael Havens	Named for local environmentalist, activist and author.
McLane	K-5	1883*	337	Owls	Dannie Clark	Named for pioneer and legislator William McLane. Originally McLane School before integrating with Olympia.
Pioneer	K-5	1969	387	Bear Cubs	Joel Lang	
Theodore Roosevelt	K-5	1908	393	Ravens	Chisa Marshall	

Name	Grade Levels/Type	Established	Enrollment	Mascot	Administrator
Olympia Regional Learning Academy	K-12 alternative		367	Orcas	Stacey Anderson (K-5) Frank Reed (6-12)

== Other facilities ==
- District Headquarters at 111 Bethel St NE, Olympia, WA 98506.
- Transportation Department at 3000 RW Johnson Blvd SW, Tumwater, WA 98512.
- Support Service Center at 1914 Wilson St SE, Olympia, WA 98501.

== Board of directors ==
The Olympia School Board currently has five voting members. The voting members in 2026 are:

- District 1: Director Maria Flores (Board Vice President)
- District 2: Director Jess Tourette Palumbo (Board President)
- District 3: Director Renee Fullerton
- District 4: Director Hilary Seidel
- District 5: Director Gilbert Lamont

The Olympia School Board also has four student representatives. The students serve in an advisory capacity at board meetings and may cast non-binding, advisory votes on motions before the board. The student representatives for the 2025-2026 school year are:

- Capital HS: Malachi Cardona
- Avanti HS: Juniper Hummel-Church
- ORLA: Emma MacDonald
- Olympia HS: Vy Le
