= Mud Bay Logging Company =

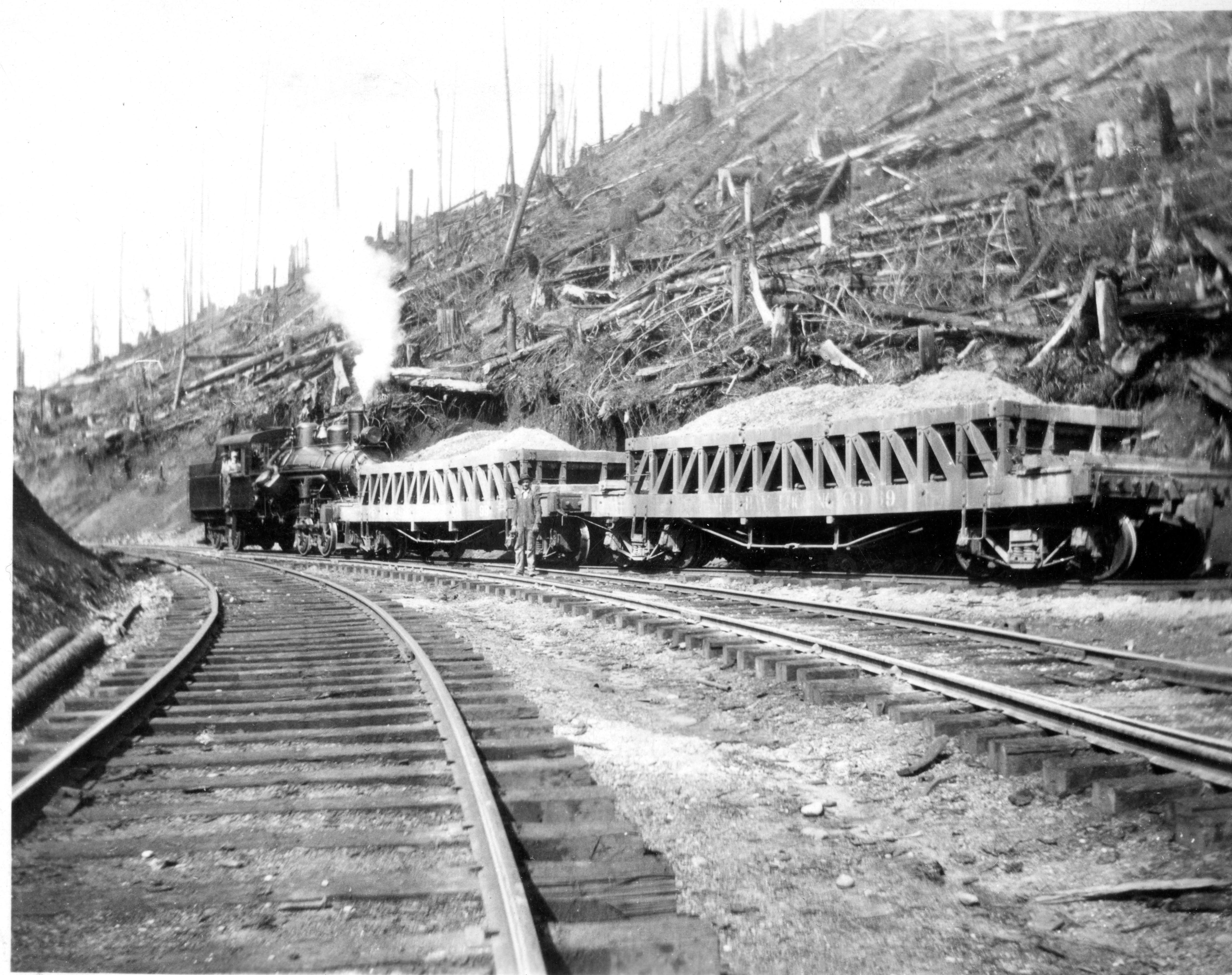
- Mud Bay logging train near a cleared hill, c. 1928

Overview
- Headquarters: Olympia, Washington
- Founders: Mark Draham; George W. Draham; Daniel O'Leary
- Dates of operation: 1910–1943

Technical
- Track gauge: 4 ft 8 1/2 in (1,435 mm)
- Track length: 35 miles (56 km) (1930)

Mud Bay Logging Company was a 20th-century logging company based in Olympia, Washington. The company was established in 1899 as Western Washington Logging Company by Mark Draham, who had previously established the Mason County Logging Company. The name changed to Mud Bay Logging Company in 1910. The company was disestablished in 1941, after the majority of forest products had been harvested from the Black Hills.

Over the course of more than thirty years, the company is estimated to have logged a total of 1.5 billion feet (460 thousand kilometres) of timber from 26,000 acres (110 km^{2}) of land, employing approx. 450 people during production peaks of the late 1920s.

== History ==
=== Operations ===
The company was incorporated on March 29, 1910 and employed approx. 125 men that year; between 1911–1918, the company was also known as the Thurston County Railway Company. The company's founders and original trustees were Mark Draham, George W. Draham and Daniel O'Leary.

Operations were in the Mud Bay, Thurston County, Washington area, harvesting timber from the Black Hills, hauling it out by logging railroad, and rafting the timber by water from a Mud Bay log dump to mills on Puget Sound. The railroad ran west from Mud Bay to Summit Lake, about halfway to McCleary, Washington; and south through the Black Hills as far as section 20 or 27 of township 17 north, range 3 west (almost as far as Littlerock) and operated at least four logging camps in the north and northeast portions of Black Hills.

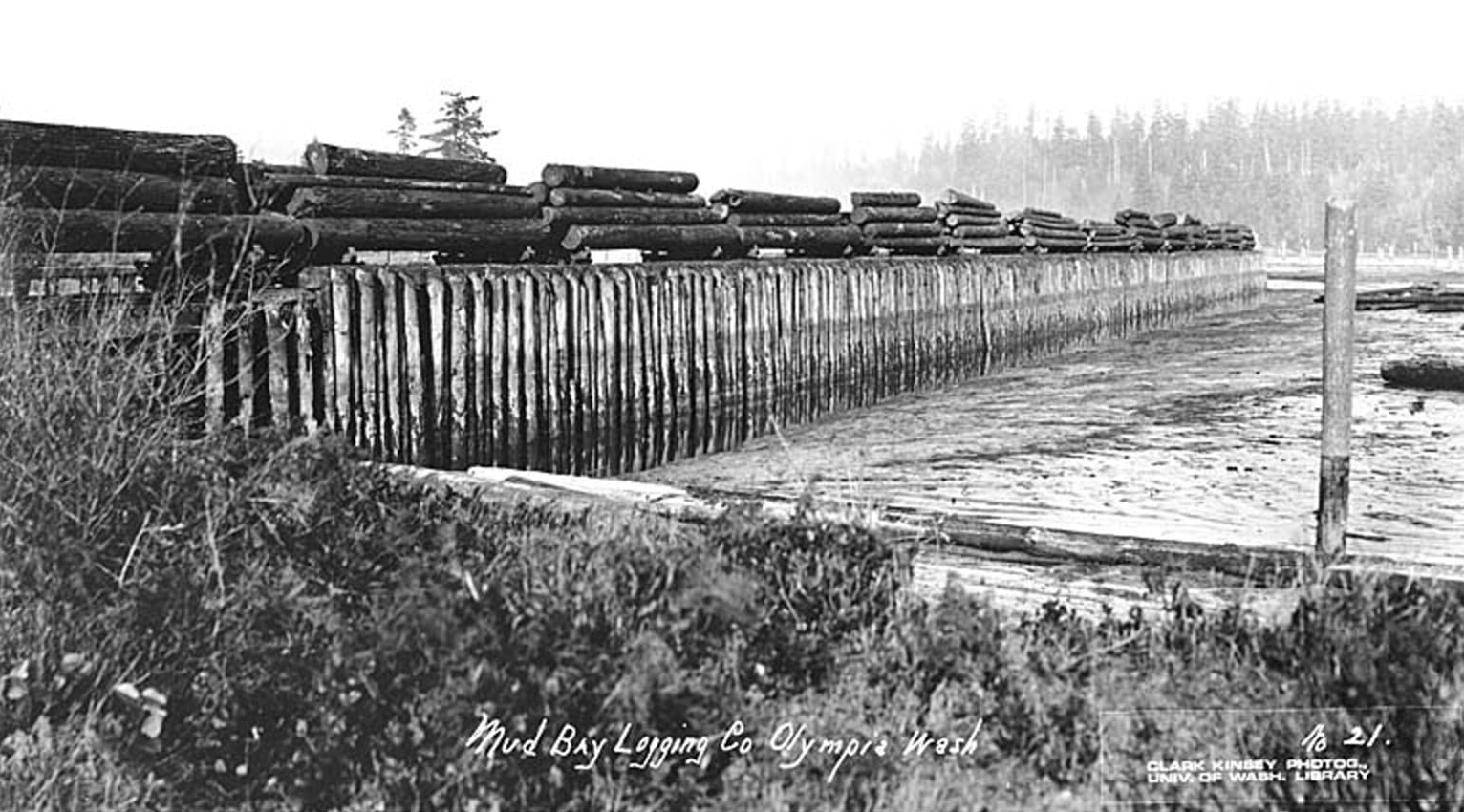
Log cars of the Mud Bay Logging Company at the Mud Bay log dump

By 1913, the company operated 13 miles (21 km) of rail track, and was equipped with two Baldwin engines and one Heisler locomotive.

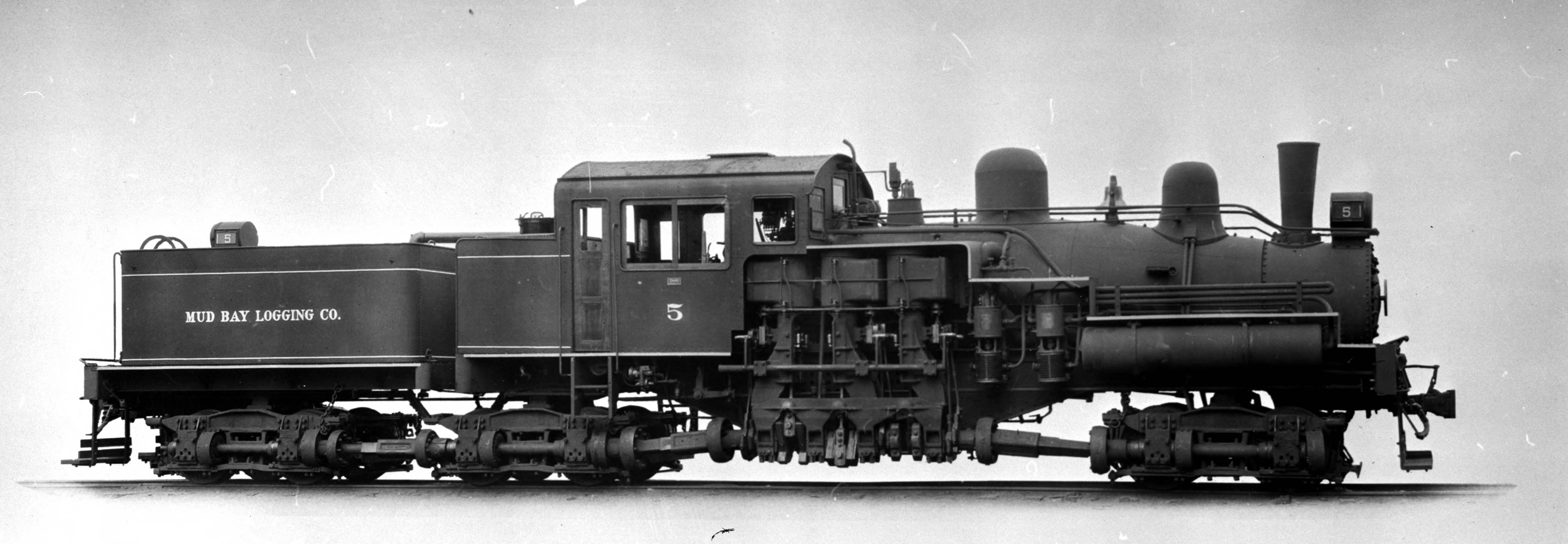
Shay locomotive No. 5, circa 1920

During the early 20th century, logging was a dangerous occupation, responsible for the deaths of 1 in 150 loggers in Washington. In November 1921, the railroad suffered one such accident, killing two men and severely injuring a third, when a train with 9 loaded cars lost control and crashed; another incident in October 1923 caused a donkey engine to topple on a foreman, crushing him to death.

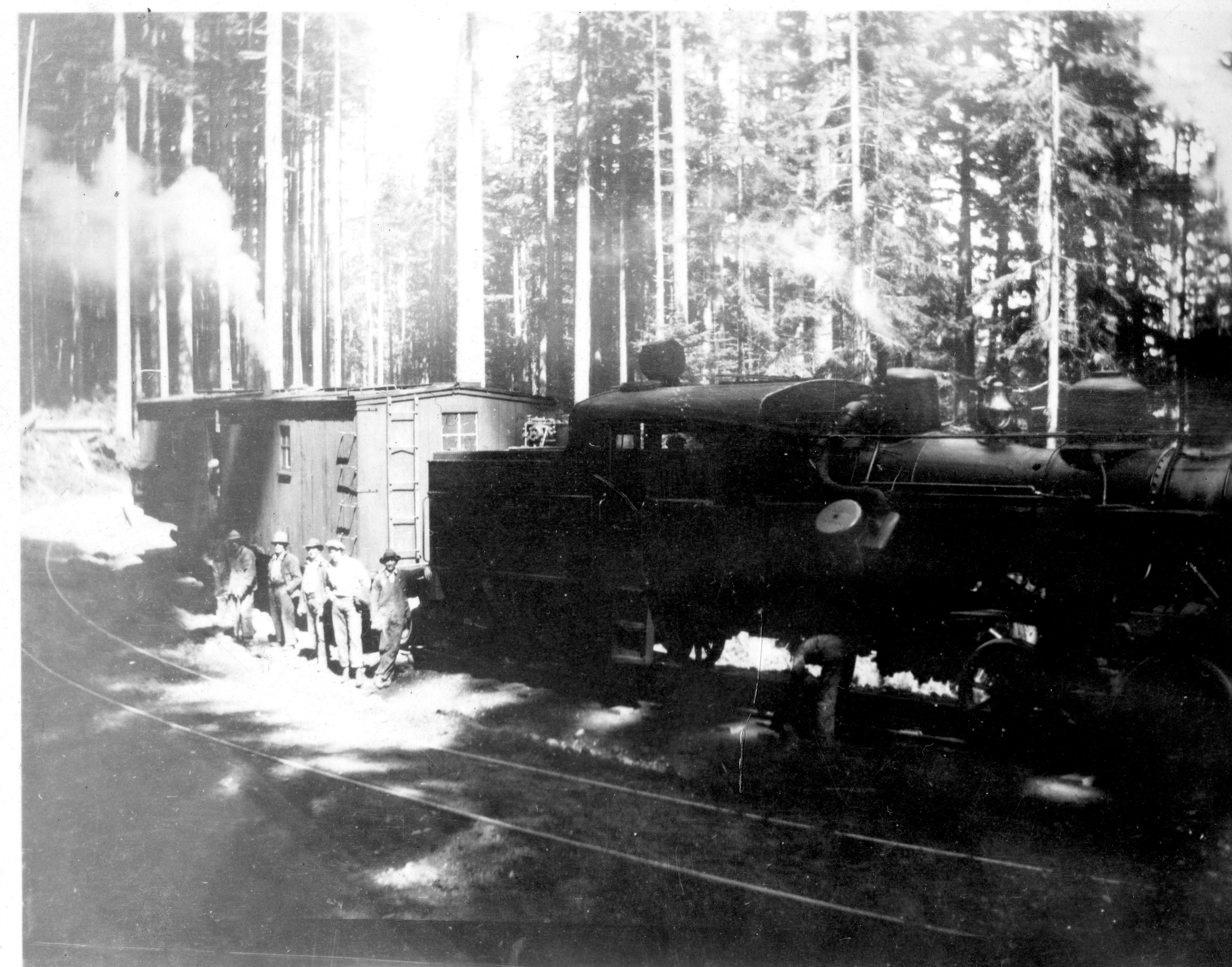
Mud Bay Logging Company Train No. 6 at rest, 1928

The company became one of the seven founding members of the State Log Patrol, incorporated in 1928 and given special quasi-law enforcement powers over timber piracy by the state legislature.

By 1930, the company had increased its rail lines to 35 miles (56 km) and had 8 locomotives.

In the 1940s, after the company ceased operations, several military groups practiced explosives demolition on former logging infrastructure throughout Capitol Forest. The corporation was formally dissolved on January 5, 1943.

=== Equipment ===
A 210,000-pound (95,000 kg) 2-6-6-2 steam powered Mallet locomotive (serial number 60412) was built in 1928 by Baldwin Locomotive Works for Mud Bay Logging Company. It became a Weyerhaeuser Timber Company logging locomotive after Mud Bay dissolved, and was operated at Klamath Falls, Oregon. It was Weyerhaeuser's last steam locomotive. It was acquired by the Northwest Railway Museum at Snoqualmie, Washington, in 1965, and was last operated in 1974.

== Legacy ==
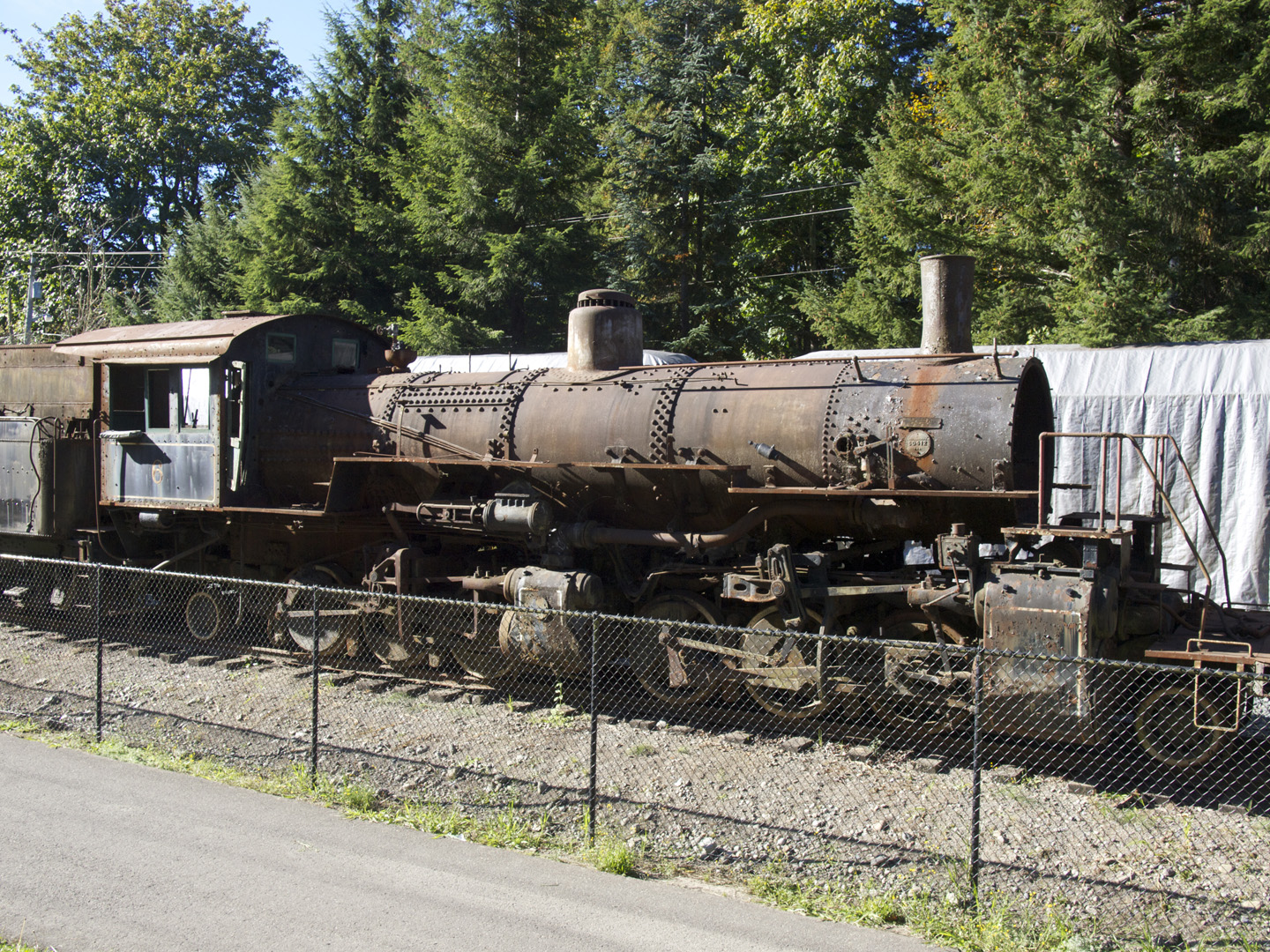
2-6-6-2 locomotive No. 6 at the Northwest Railway Museum

The company was one of the last in the South Puget Sound area to use a logging railroad. Traces of the rail line can be easily seen across the greater Olympia area, now used as county roads and private driveways, a natural gas pipeline, and a nature trail.

A portion of the logging railroad has been converted to a rail trail, now the McLane Creek Nature Trail. The timberlands worked by Mud Bay have become part of 100,000-acre (40,000 ha) Capitol State Forest, a state-managed protected area including multi-use forest where logging continues but with modern forestry practices.

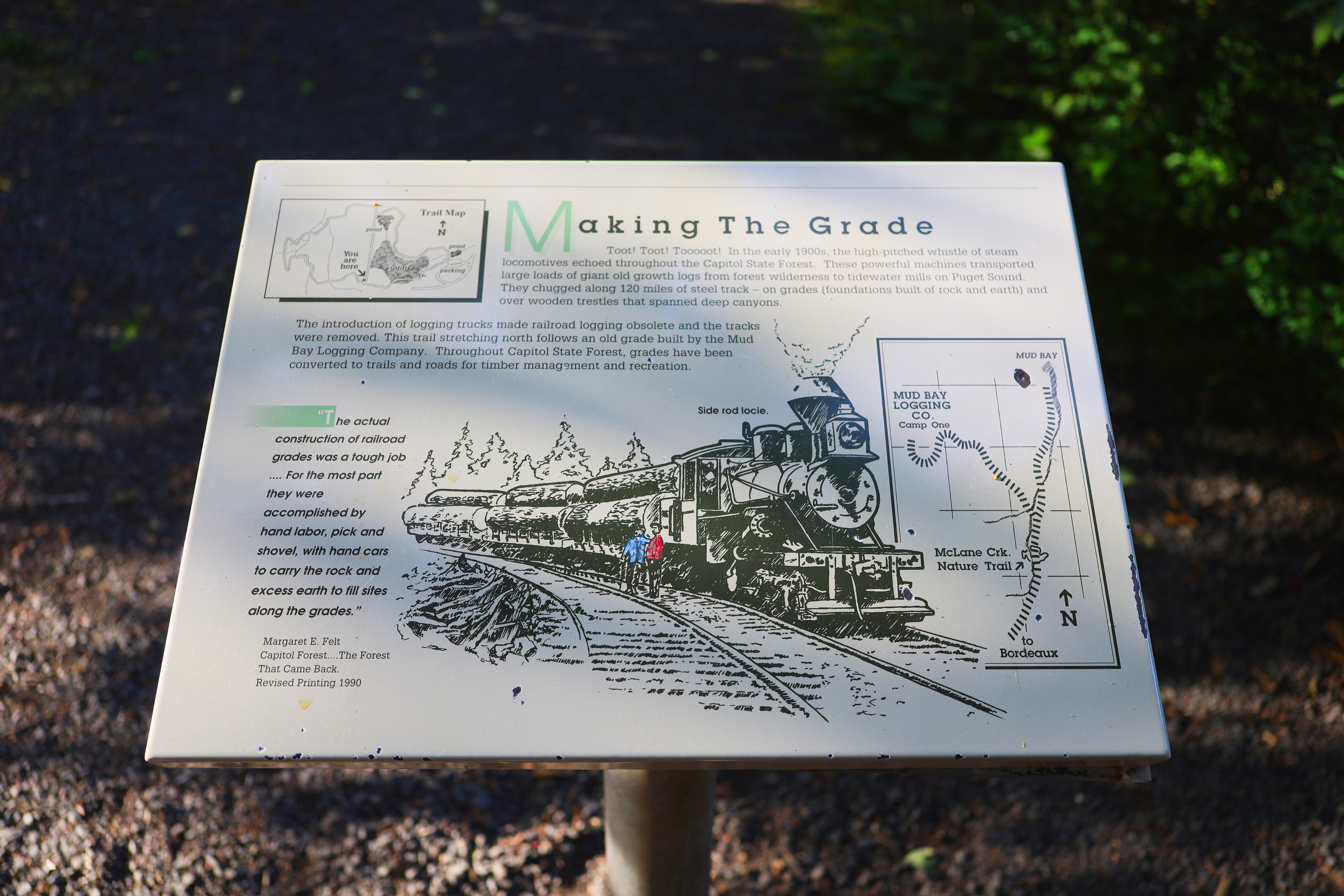
Railroad marker at McLane Creek

The Delphi School, a primary schoolhouse built in 1910 and originally intended to educate company employees' children, remains as a historic landmark in Delphi, Washington.
