= Bush Middle School =

Bush Middle School may refer to:

- Barbara Bush Middle School in Irving, Texas (Dallas-Fort Worth) - Carrollton-Farmers Branch Independent School District
- Bush Middle School in San Antonio, Texas - North East Independent School District
- G. W. Bush Middle School in Tumwater, Washington - Tumwater School District
