= William McLane (Washington politician) =

American politician

- Born: November 3, 1819
- Died: March 12, 1906 (aged 86); Thurston County, Washington
- Burial place: McLane Cemetery, Olympia, Washington
- Occupations: Pioneer and politician
- Spouse: Martha McLeod McLane

William McLane (1819–1906) was an Olympia, Washington pioneer and member of the Washington Territorial Legislature. McLane was born on November 3, 1819 in Butler County, Pennsylvania. He and Martha McLeod McLane pioneered a 307-or-320-acre (124 or 129 ha) homestead on Mud Bay.

Local place names such as McLane Creek are named for him, as is McLane Elementary School in the Olympia School District, on a hill above and east of Mud Bay; and the McLane Grange in Delphi Valley, to whom he donated land.

== Biography ==
McLane originally left Pennsylvania in 1852 and made his way to Washington Territory by ox-drawn wagon. He returned east to marry in 1854 then returned to Washington by sea via the Isthmus of Panama. Once there, he homesteaded at Bush Prairie (founded by pioneer George Bush, now in Tumwater), and later moved to the Mud Bay homestead.

McLane died in Thurston County on March 12, 1906, after living in his home for over 50 years.

== Legislative terms ==
McLane represented several counties in the Washington Territory:

- 9th session (1861) House — Thurston County
- 10th session (1862) House — Thurston County
- 11th session (1863) House — Thurston County
- 13th session (1865) House — Mason and Chehalis County
- 1st biennial session (1867) Council — Thurston and Lewis County
- 2nd biennial session (1869) Council — Thurston and Lewis County
- 4th biennial session (1873) Council — Thurston and Lewis County
