= Delphi School =

Former school in Thurston County, Washington

- U.S. National Register of Historic Places
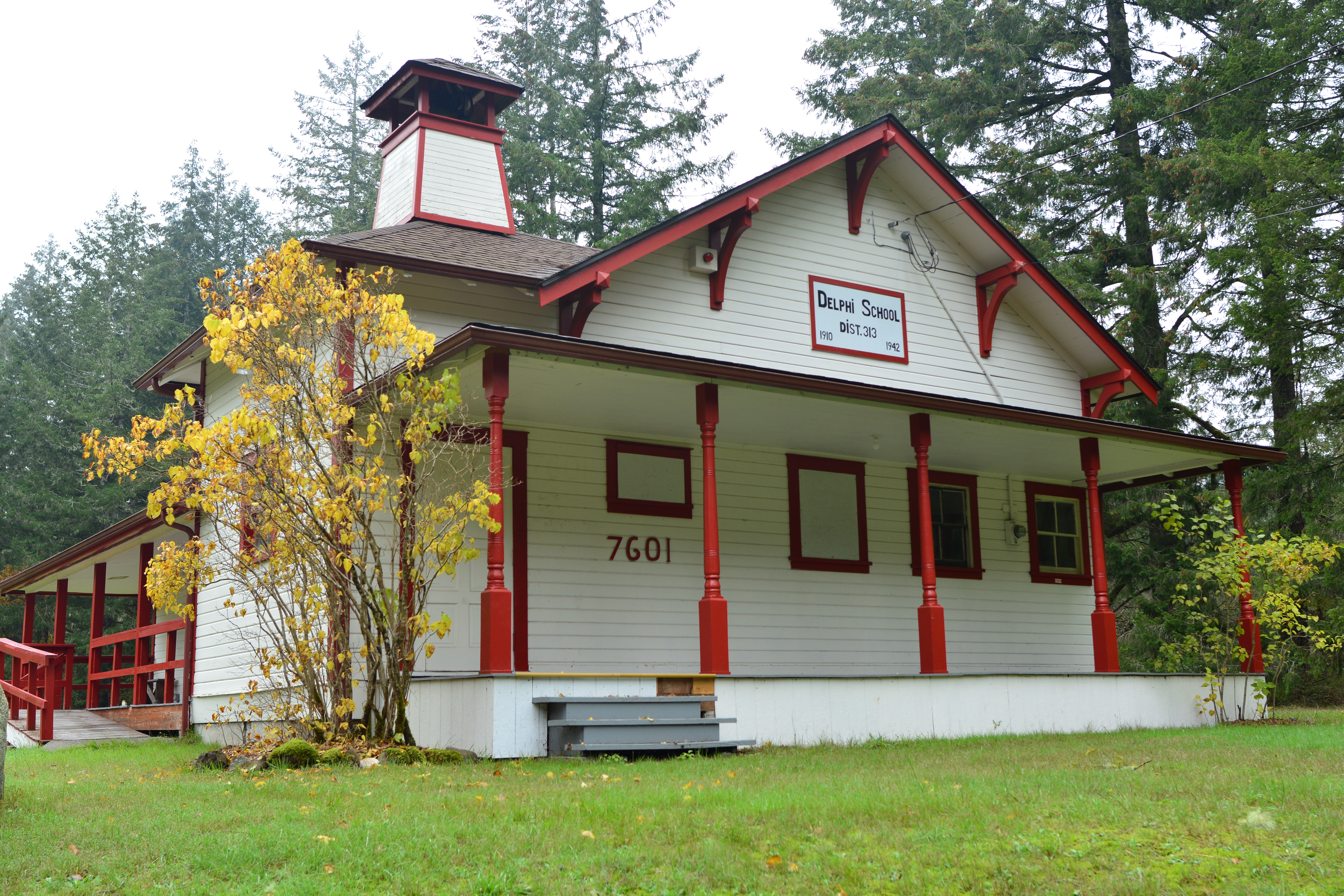
- View of school, November 2020

- Location within Washington (state)
- Location: 7601 Southwest Delphi Road, Olympia, Washington
- Coordinates: 46°58′45.5″N 123°01′11.4″W
- Built: 1910
- NRHP reference No.: 90001075
- Added to NRHP: July 19, 1990

The Delphi School is a historic building in Delphi, Washington, listed on the National Register of Historic Places since 1990. The building is a one-story, rectangular structure on a concrete foundation containing a single classroom. It served as a principal public primary education facility in rural Thurston County between 1910 and 1942. It currently serves as a privately owned community meeting hall.

== History ==
The building was complete in 1910 on a parcel donated by the Mud Bay Logging Company, intended to educate employees' children. At its peak, the school educated 15 students per year, up to the eighth grade.

The school closed in 1942, one year after logging operations ended.

The property was donated to become a community meeting hall in 1944, and the building has been maintained since by the Delphi Community Club, a 501(c)(3) non-profit organization since 2015.

In 2006, UNAVCO strainmeter and seismometer equipment was installed on the property.

== See also ==
- Delphi, Washington
- Mud Bay Logging Company
- McLane Creek
- Black Lake (Washington)
- History of Olympia, Washington
