= McLane Creek =

Creek in Thurston County, Washington state

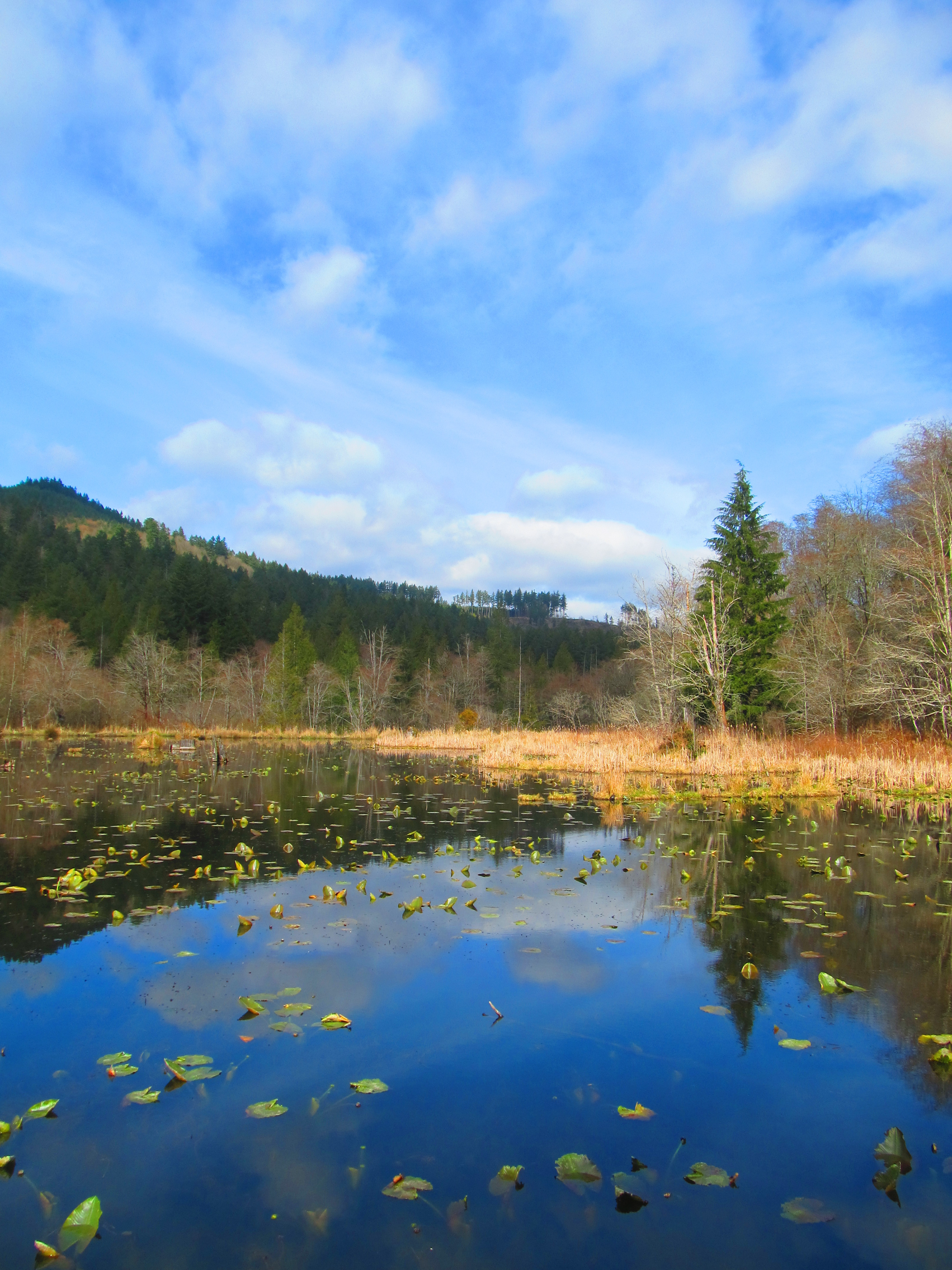
- Beaver Pond, McClane Creek Nature Trail, 2018
- Etymology: William McLane

Physical characteristics
- Source: Capitol Forest
- Mouth: Mud Bay in Eld Inlet
  - coordinates: 47°02′05″N 122°59′26″W
  - elevation: 16 feet (4.9 m)

Basin features
- Geographic Names Information System: 1511614

McLane Creek is a stream in Thurston County in the U.S. state of Washington. It enters Puget Sound at the southern end of Mud Bay in Eld Inlet. Several trails maintained by the Washington State Department of Natural Resources are available year-round for public hiking use.

== History ==
McLane Creek was named after William McLane, a pioneer settler and territorial politician. In the early 20th century, Mud Bay Logging Company operated a timber harvesting railroad along the creek.

In 1999, ashes of Kurt Cobain were scattered in McLane Creek by his daughter.

Approximately 36 acres (15 ha) at the mouth of McLane Creek at Eld Inlet was purchased via a grant under Capitol Land Trust in 2025. The land is part of a conservation easement and an overall effort to expand a protected area of shoreline and estuaries at the inlet; the addition expands the inlet protected area to 450 acres (180 ha).

The area is also known for its annual salmon run, when salmon return to McLane Creek each autumn to spawn, attracting visitors to the creek's viewing areas.

== Geography ==
The headwaters of the creek occur in Capitol Forest and the waterway passes southeast and then mostly north near the McLane Creek Nature Trail area. The brook continues a northern trajectory passing west of the Black Hills, and the cities of Tumwater and Olympia, before emptying into Puget Sound at Mud Bay.

== Nature Trail ==
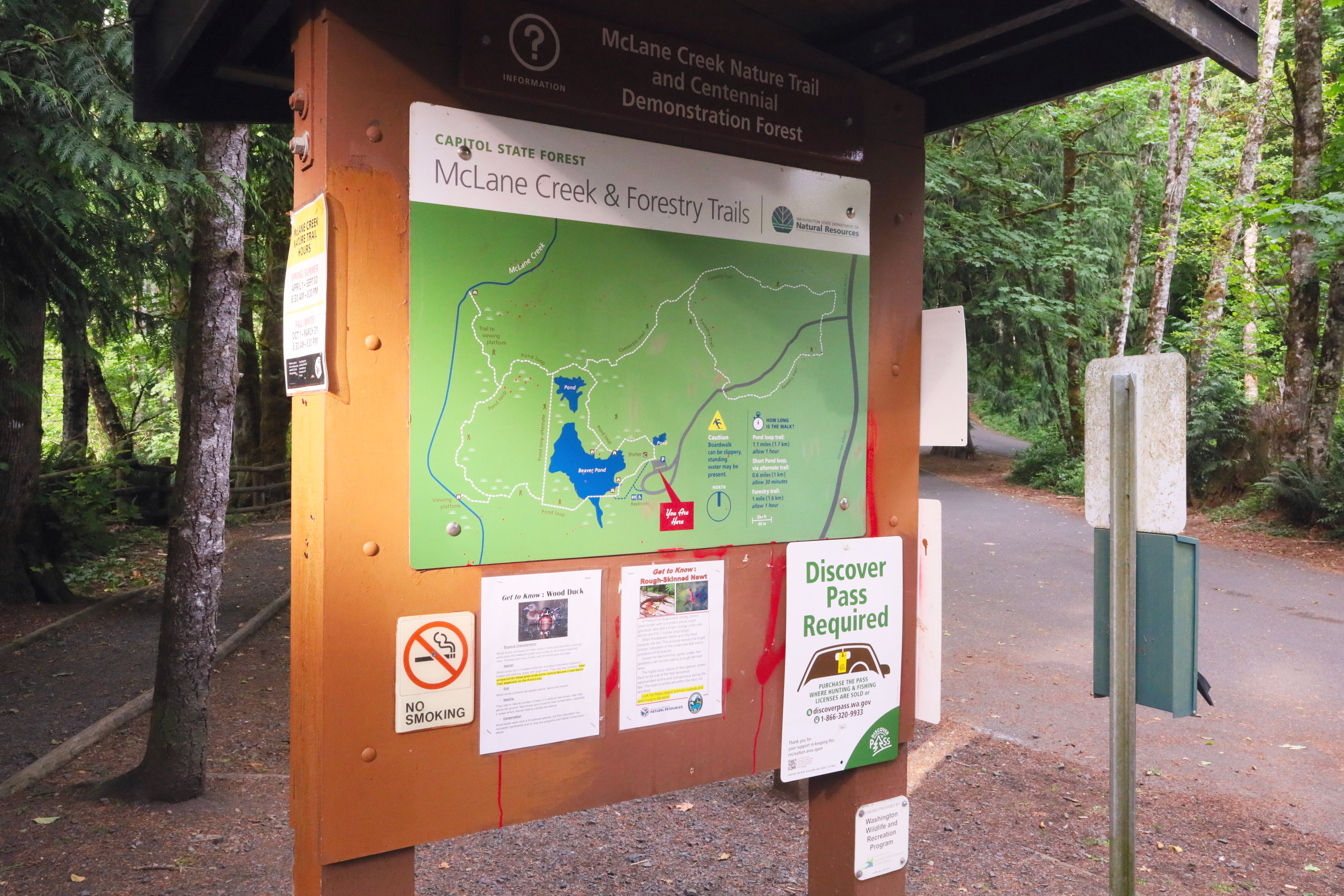
Creek and Forestry trails marker, June 2025

The McLane Creek Nature & Forestry Trail includes a 1.1-mile (1.8 km) looping trail, with a 0.6-mile (0.97 km) extension, and an additional 1.0-mile (1.6 km) path through the forest.

The trails are managed by the Department of Natural Resources. The flat trail, with a mix of boardwalks and natural pathways, contains wooden platforms for wildlife observation; visitors can also walk to the creek and through wetland areas. Remnants of demolished railroad tracks, from the Mud Bay Logging Company, cross the grounds.

Along with the aptly named Beaver Pond, visitors can view avian wildlife such as Canadian geese, kingfishers, and mallards. The creek is host to migrating chum salmon, usually in December. The area also includes second growth forest, with cedar, hemlock, and maple trees; wetlands contain alder, cascara and willows.

== See also ==
- List of geographic features in Thurston County, Washington
