= Larch Mountain (Thurston County, Washington) =

Mountain in Washington (state), United States

Highest point
- Elevation: 2,664 ft (812 m) NAVD 88
- Prominence: 2,316 ft (706 m)
- Coordinates: 46°59′14″N 123°08′27″W

Geography
- Location: Thurston County, Washington, U.S.
- Parent range: Black Hills
- Topo map: USGS Capitol Peak

Larch Mountain is a 2,664-foot (812 m) summit in the Black Hills range of Thurston County, Washington state. It is one of the two highest peaks in the Black Hills, along with Capitol Peak, and preceding 2,356-foot (718 m) Rock Candy Mountain. It is the most prominent peak in Thurston County.

== See also ==
- List of geographic features in Thurston County, Washington
