= Delphi, Washington =

- Unincorporated community
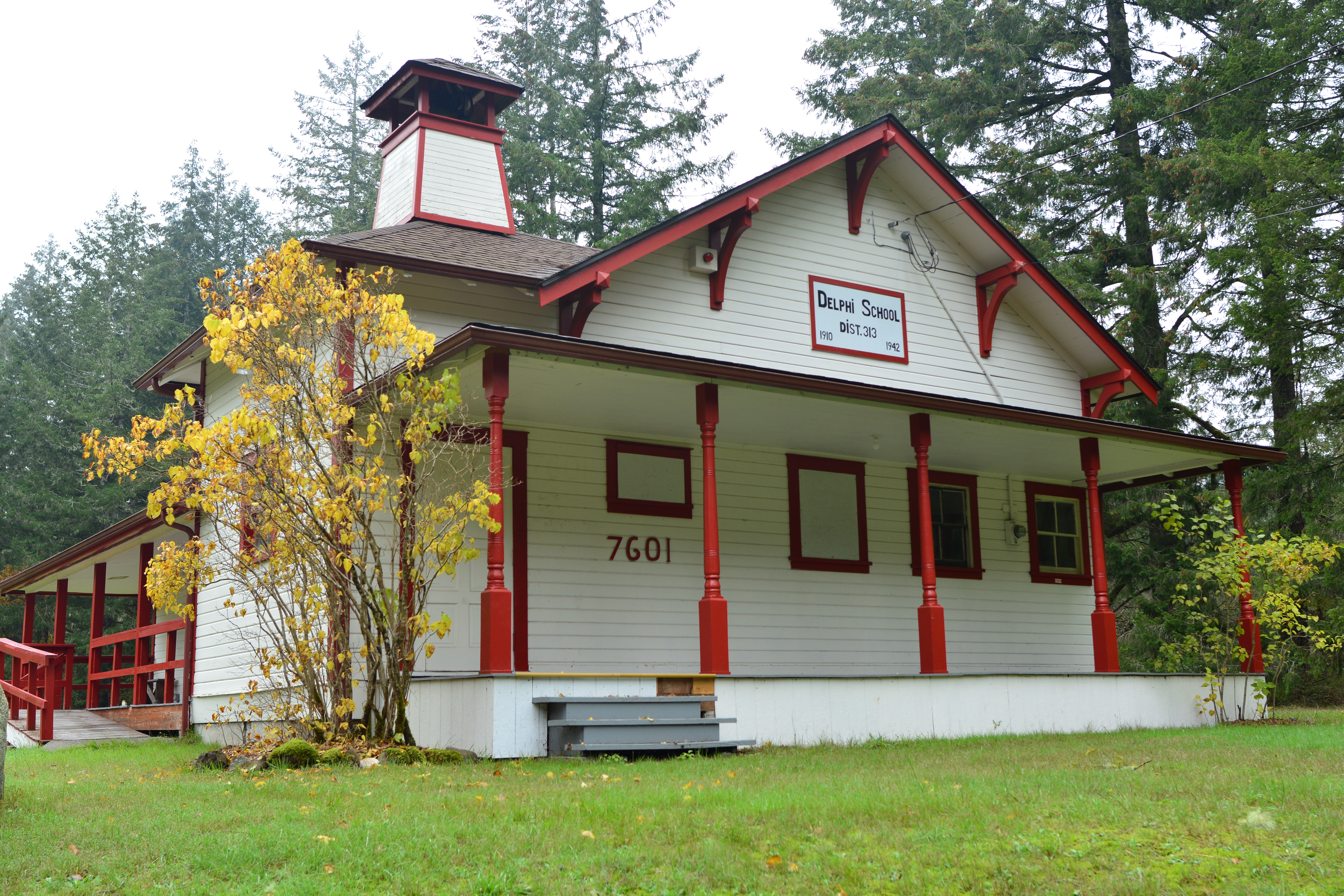
- Delphi School, November 2020
- Interactive map of Delphi, Washington
- Coordinates: 46°58′44″N 123°01′08″W
- Country: United States
- State: Washington
- County: Thurston
- Time zone: UTC-8 (Pacific (PST))
  - Summer (DST): UTC-7 (PDT)

Delphi is an unincorporated community in Thurston County, in the U.S. state of Washington. The community is located west of Tumwater and Black Lake; the town of Littlerock lies to the south. The name Delphi denotes "place of the Gods".

== History ==
A post office was established at Delphi in 1892, and remained in operation until 1923.

The Delphi School was built in 1910 and served as a primary school for the local community until the 1940s.

== Park and Recreation ==
The Mima Mounds Natural Area Preserve, declared a National Natural Landmark, is south of the community. Delphi lies near the border of Capitol State Forest.
