= Brooke Feldmeier =

American athletics competitor

Personal information
- Nationality: American
- Born: 26 January 1996 (age 30) Seattle, Washington

Sport
- Sport: Athletics
- Event: 800m

Achievements and titles
- Personal best(s): 800m: 1:59.08 (Eugene, 2023)

Brooke Feldmeier is an American track and field athlete who predominantly runs 800m races.

== Early life ==
Feldmeier is from Seattle, Washington. She attended Tumwater High School, University of Mississippi and the University of Oregon. Feldmeier was a part of the Oregon team that won the Cross Country, Indoor, & Outdoor NCAA Championships during the 2017 season, and was a five-time All-American. She would later volunteer as an assistant coach with the University of North Florida running team.

== Career ==
In January 2022, she recorded 2:00.92 to win the women's 800m race at the Razorback International in Fayetteville, Arkansas, which was a new personal best and a world leading time.

In June 2022, she reached the final of the 800m at the USATF Championships by setting a new personal best of 1:59.44. In the final she finished fifth with a new lower personal best time of 1:59.08.

In June 2023, Feldmeier acted as one of the pacemakers for Faith Kipyegon as she set a new world record for the women's 1500m at the Diamond League meeting in Florence.

She was selected as part of the American team to run the 800m at the 2023 Pan American Games in Santiago, Chile in November 2023.
