= Black Hills High School =

A.G. West Black Hills High School

Location
- 7741 Littlerock Road SW; Tumwater, Thurston, Washington 98512; United States; 46.978261°N 122.94798°W

Information
- School type: Public secondary Public
- Established: 1997
- School district: Tumwater School District
- NCES School ID: 530910002602
- Principal: Dave Myers
- Teaching staff: 41
- Grades: 9-12
- Age range: 14 - 19
- Enrollment: 792 (2023–2024)
  - Grade 9: 193
  - Grade 10: 194
  - Grade 11: 195
  - Grade 12: 175
- Student to teacher ratio: 22.66
- Colors: Navy Blue & Red
- Athletics: Yes
- Athletics conference: 2A Evergreen
- Mascot: Wolf
- Nickname: Wolfpack
- Rival: Tumwater, Shelton, Aberdeen, Centralia, W.F. West
- Newspaper: Daily Bulletin
- Website: bhhs.tumwater.k12.wa.us
- Last updated: August 21, 2025

A.G. West Black Hills High School (BHHS) is a public secondary school in Tumwater, Washington, United States, serving grades 9–12 in Thurston County. A part of the Tumwater School District, BHHS serves approximately 1,000 students each year. It is situated on 41 acres, and includes a 188,000 square foot building with parking and athletic fields to support high school and community programs. The Black Hills High School staff is composed of 3 Administrators, 52 teachers, 2 counselors, 8 Educational Assistants, and 25 Support Staff.

== History ==
A.G. West Black Hills High School opened in the fall of 1997. The school was named after Arthur Garret West (1886–1979) because of his commitment and interest in good schools, roads, and community improvement. It was also named after the Black Hills, which dominate the skyline to the west.

== Athletics ==
A.G. West Black Hills High School is a member of the Evergreen Conference, a 2A league of the Washington Interscholastic Activities Association.

State Championships
Season	Sport	Number of Championships	Year
Fall		0	
Winter	Rifle Team	2	2009–2010, 2010-2011
Spring	Fastpitch Softball, Girls; Boys Track	3	2005, 2010, 2016
Total		5	

State Championships, 2nd place:

Girls Basketball - 1999; Girls Golf - 2001

Rifle Team- 1st Place Nationals, 3rd Place Nationals- 2009–2010, 2010-2011 respectively

== Extracurriculars ==
A.G. West Black Hills High School features a number of extracurricular options, including marching band, National Honor Society, Gender Sexuality Alliance, DECA, book club, drama, yearbook, and rifle team.
