= Tumwater High School =

Location
- 700 Israel Road SE; Tumwater, Washington 98501; United States; 46°59′10″N 122°54′59″W

Information
- Type: Public secondary
- Established: 1961
- School district: Tumwater School District
- Principal: Zach Suderman
- Teaching staff: 50.30 (FTE)
- Grades: 9–12
- Enrollment: 1,139 (2023–2024)
- Student to teacher ratio: 22.64
- Campus: Suburban
- Colors: Green & White
- Mascot: Thunderbirds
- Website: ths.tumwater.k12.wa.us

Tumwater High School (THS) is a secondary school in Tumwater, Washington, United States, serving grades 9–12 in Thurston County. It is one of two comprehensive high schools in the Tumwater School District. Tumwater High School generally draws students from the portions of the Tumwater School District east of Interstate 5 and the Littlerock area west of I-5. Tumwater High School caters to its student population by having an extended parking lot, called "overflow", which allows for some ease whilst parking. During bus arrival, there are usual delays to the ability to park.

== Athletics ==
Tumwater High School offers athletic teams in cross country, golf, football, soccer, dance, swim and dive, tennis, volleyball, basketball, bowling, wrestling, baseball, fastpitch, and track and field. Tumwater also offers a club rifle team, which currently holds two national championships. The dance team also holds a national championship.

Tumwater High School is a 2A-division member of the Washington Interscholastic Activities Association.

The town has supported athletics at Tumwater High School and the recently formed Black Hills High School. The school's teams are known as the T-Birds.

Tumwater is best known for its football program. Most of the success can be credited to long time head football coach Sid Otton, who coached from 1973–2016. In the 2005 season, Otton broke the all-time Washington state wins record of 273 wins. During Otton's tenure, Tumwater won five state titles, was nationally ranked four times, and made the state playoffs more than 23 times. The final state title won under Coach Otton came on Dec. 4, 2010 against Archbishop Murphy High School in the 2A State Football Championship, by a score of 34–14. Otton compiled a career record of 394–131 in 49 seasons and retired following the 2016 season after 43 years at Tumwater. He retired as the all-time winningest high school football coach in Washington State history. He was elected to the Washington State Football Coaches Association Hall of Fame in 1996 For the 2017 season, former Otton player Bill Beattie ('78) took over as head coach and has continued the "Tumwater Winning Football" tradition. The T-birds won their sixth state football title with a 48–34 win over Steilacoom on Dec., 2019. William Garrow took over as head coach ahead of the 2023 season, leading the T-Birds back to the 2A state championship game in his first year, where they lost to Anacortes.

Tumwater's baseball team, coached by MLB veteran Lyle Overbay, won back-to-back state titles in 2022 and 2023, while its fastpitch team won the state title in 2022.

The Tumwater volleyball program has also had a lot of success over the years, including winning the state championship in 2008, 2014, and 2016. Many of the former Tumwater Volleyball players have gone on to play at the collegiate level. They are attending colleges such as Gonzaga University, Northwest University, Eastern Oregon University, Western Oregon University, and many other schools.

The U.S. Department of Education announced a Title IX investigation into Tumwater School District for allowing a transgender athlete in the opposing team against the Girls' basketball team in February 2025.

State championships
Season	Sport	Number of championships	Year
Fall	Football	6	1987, 1989, 1990, 1993, 2010, 2019
Fall	Volleyball, girls	3	2008, 2014 and 2016
Winter		0	
Spring	Fastpitch softball, girls	3	1993, 2006, 2022
Spring	Track and Field, girls	1	2023
Spring	Baseball, boys	2	2022, 2023
Total		13	

State championships, 2nd place:

- Girls' basketball - 2007, 2010
- Girls' cross country - 1984
- Fastpitch softball - 1992
- Boys' golf - 1997, 1998
- Boys' tennis - 1986
- Boys' track and field - 1992
- Girls' volleyball - 2007, 2011, 2015
- Baseball - 2013

== Notable alumni ==
- Brooke Feldmeier, 800m runner, Olympian
- Cade Otton, NFL Tight End
- Matt Johnson, NFL Safety
- Brad Otton Former NFL QB
- Barrett Martin Grammy Winner, Percussionist, Writer
