= Capitol State Forest =

State forest in Washington, United States

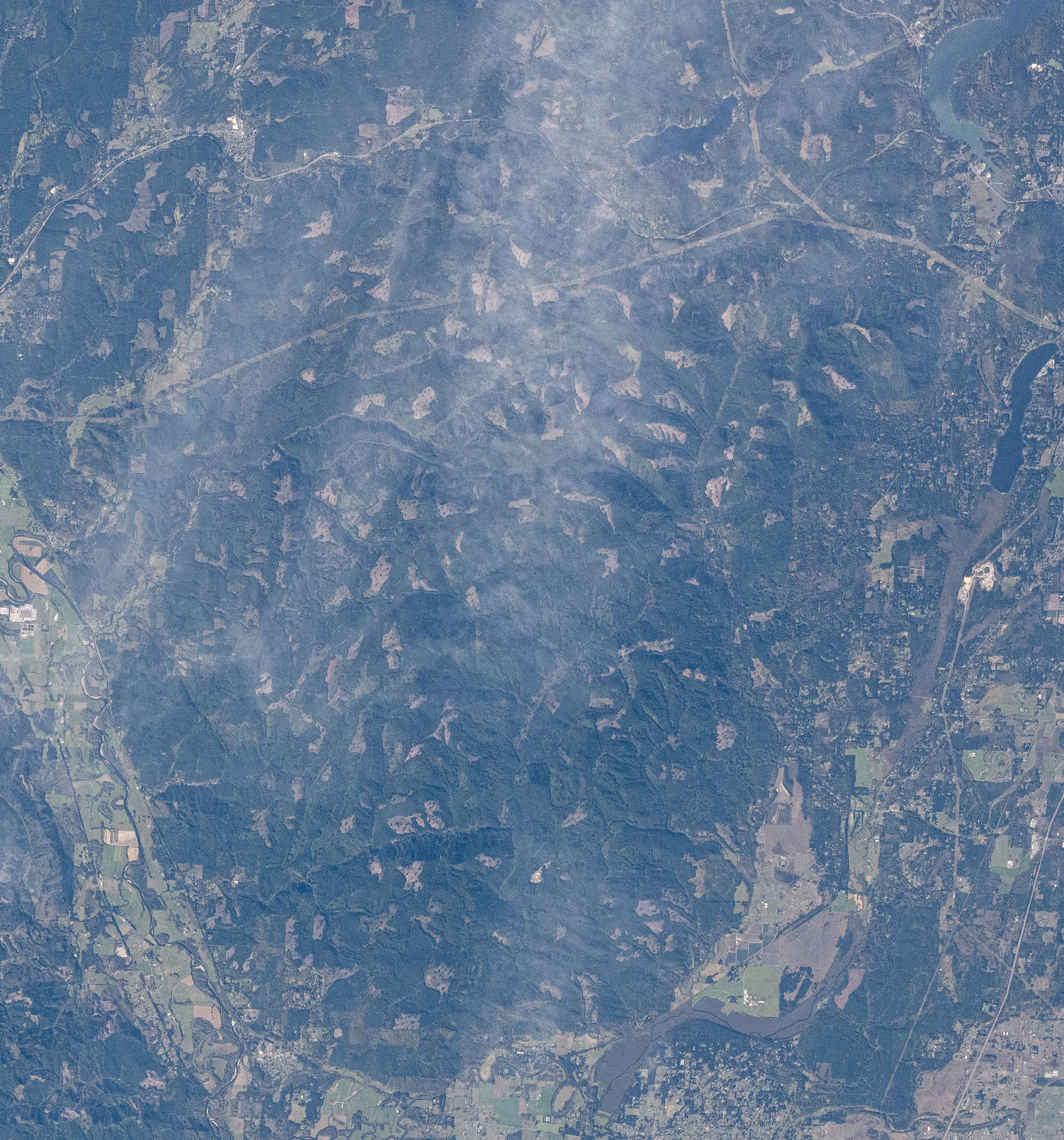
- View from Expedition 72, October 2024
- Interactive map of Capitol State Forest
- Location: Thurston, Washington, United States
- Nearest city: Tumwater, Washington
- Coordinates: 46°58′21.8″N 123°8′19.49″W
- Area: 111,000 acres (450 km^{2})
- Elevation: 2,658 ft (810 m)
- Operator: Washington State Department of Natural Resources
- Website: dnr.wa.gov

The Capitol State Forest is a 110,000-acre (450 km^{2}) state forest in Thurston and Grays Harbor counties in Washington, used for both commercial logging operations and recreation. The forest, containing the Black Hills, is surrounded by various preserves and wildlife areas; it contains Mima mounds geologic features and is the headwater for McLane Creek. Capitol State Forest is managed by Washington State Department of Natural Resources and considered public land.

== History ==
Prior to logging in the early 20th century, large old-growth trees up to 250 feet (76 m) in height and 12 feet (3.7 m) in diameter occupied the forest.

== Geography ==
Capitol Forest is approximately bounded by U.S. Route 12 to the southwest, Interstate 5 to the east and State Route 8 to the north.

It roughly contains the Black Hills. The Mima Mounds Natural Area Preserve is directly east and units of the Scatter Creek Wildlife Area, such as the Black River Wildlife Area and Glacial Heritage Wildlife Area, are to the southeast.

Cities and towns near its borders include Olympia, Tumwater, Littlerock, Oakville, and McCleary.

== Recreation ==
The forest is open to the public for off-road motorcycles, mountain biking, horseback riding, and hiking. Several cross-country cycling and downhill mountain biking trail systems are maintained by volunteers throughout the forest.

As of 2025, on ongoing project has been undertaken by the city of Olympia to connect existing trails in areas and neighborhoods between Capitol Forest and the Washington State Capitol campus. The commuter, "multi-modal" system is known as the Capitol to Capitol (CTC) trail.

=== McLane Creek ===
The forest contains the McLane Creek Nature Trail located in an eastern portion of the park. A flat, 1.1-mile (1.8 km) looping, with an additional 1.0-mile (1.6 km) extension, it contains a mix of boardwalks and natural pathways with wildlife viewing platforms.

Visitors can walk to McLane Creek, the headwaters of which begin in the forest, and through wetland areas and second growth forest. Visitors can view avian wildlife such as Canadian geese, kingfishers, and mallards and the creek is host to migrating Chum salmon, usually in December.

=== Mima Mounds ===
The forest includes Mima mounds geologic features, located at the Mima Mounds Natural Area Preserve.

== Gallery ==
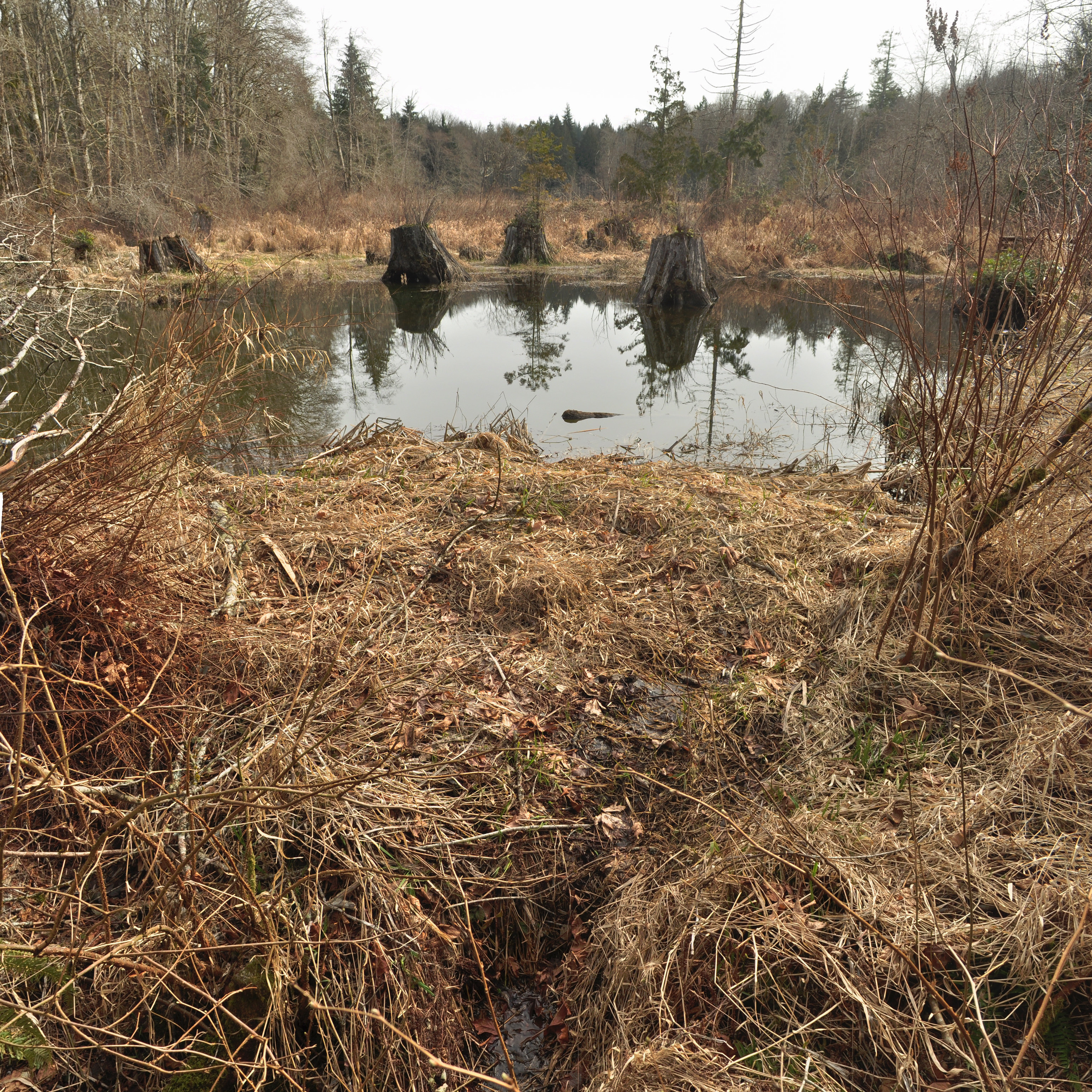
Beaver dam and pond with boardwalk on McLane Creek Nature Trail, March 2019

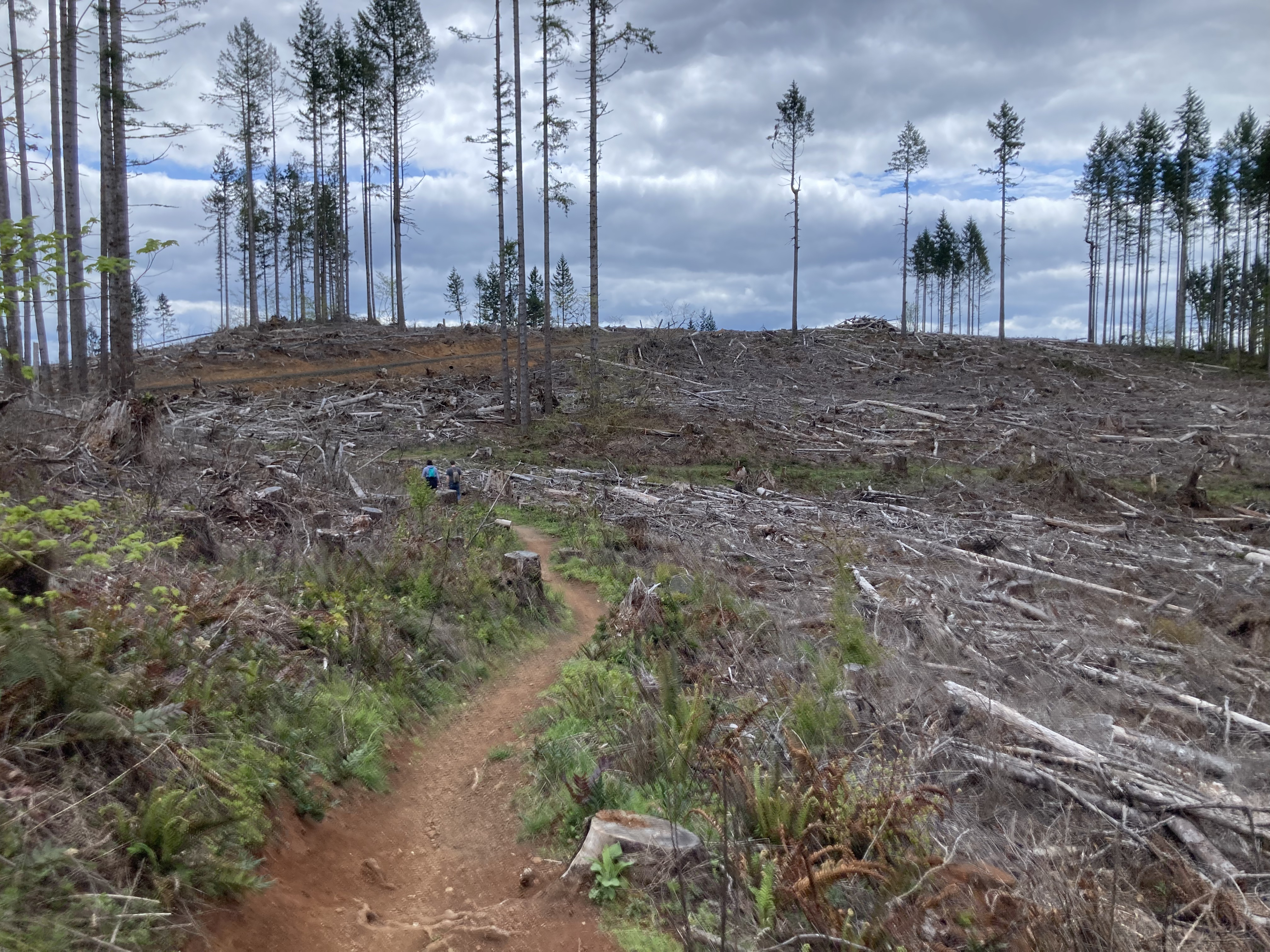
Two people hike along a recent clear cut, April 2025

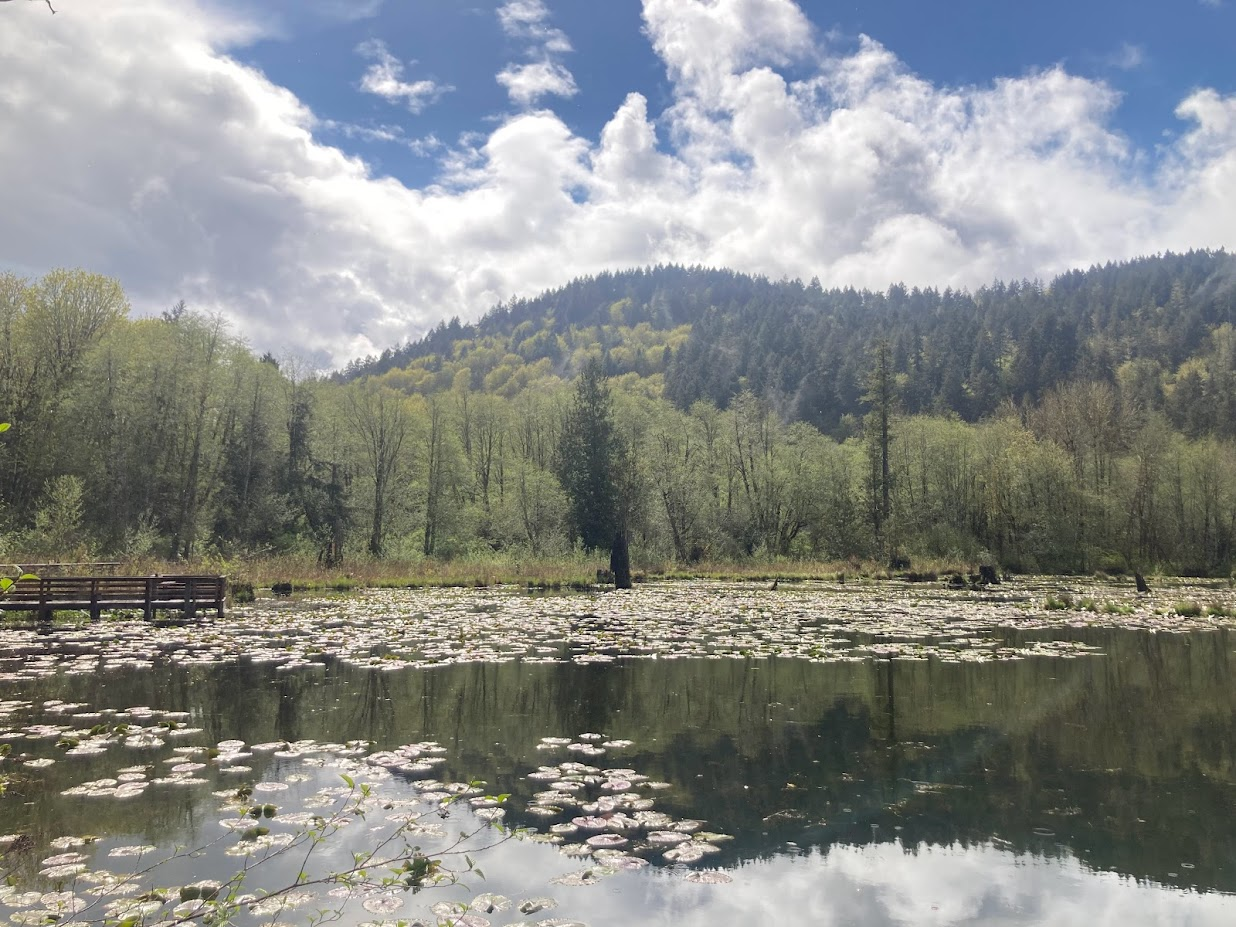
Beaver pond at McLane Creek Nature Trail, April 2022

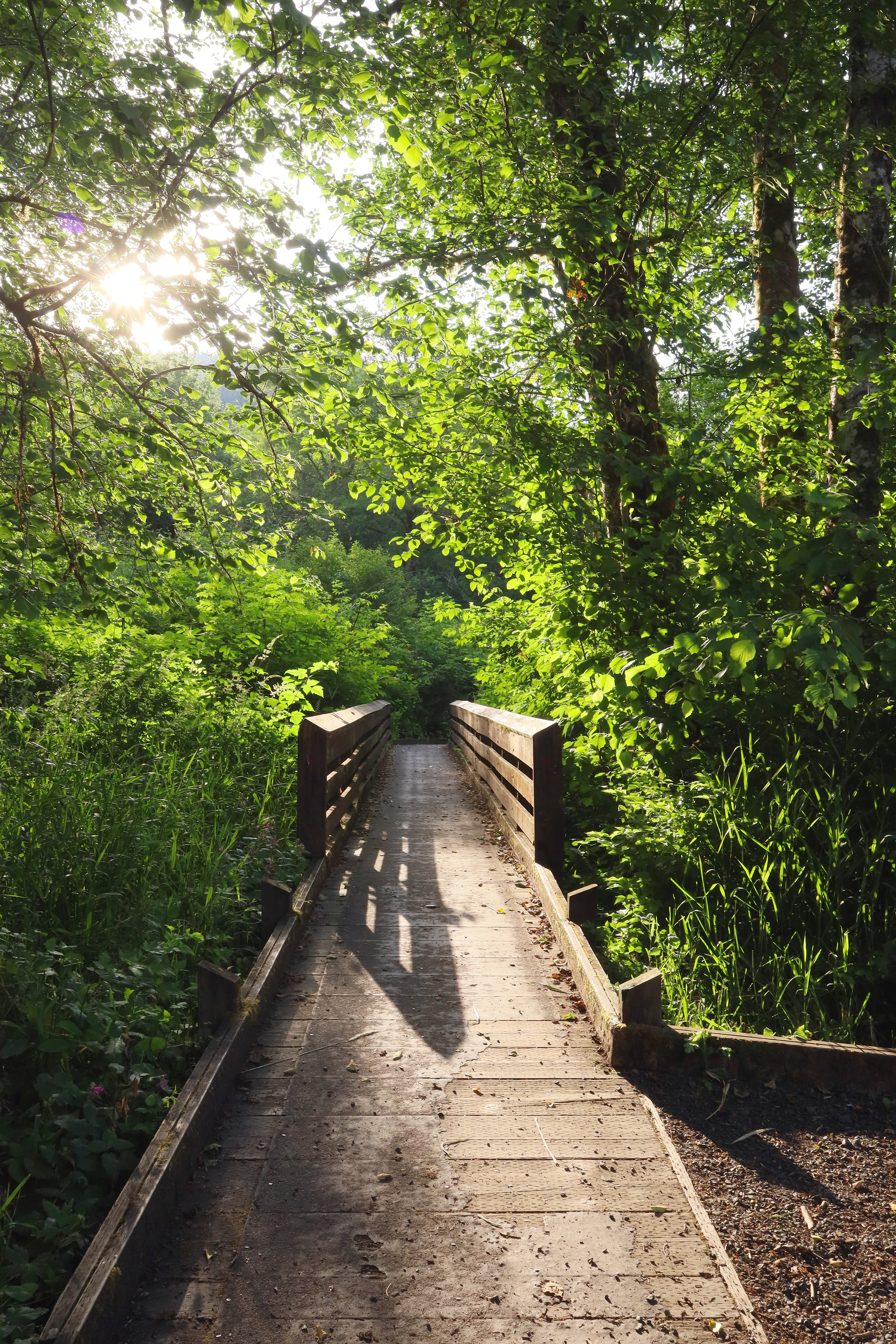
McLane Creek Nature Trail, June 2025

== See also ==
- Capitol Peak (Thurston County)
- List of geographic features in Thurston County, Washington
- List of parks and recreation in Thurston County, Washington
- Mud Bay Logging Company
