= Capitol Peak (Thurston County) =

Mountain in Washington (state), United States

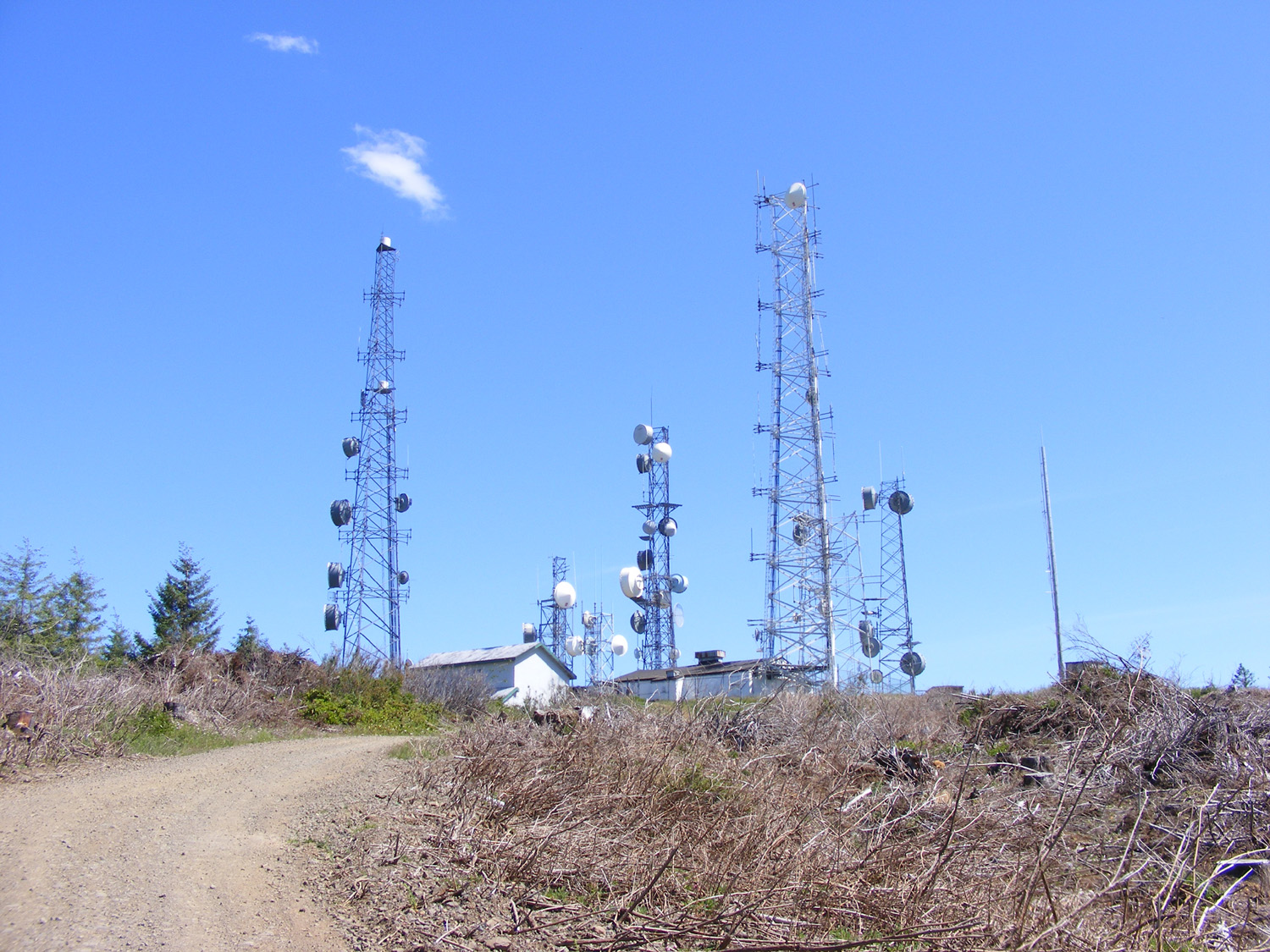

Highest point
- Elevation: 2,658 ft (810 m) NAVD 88
- Prominence: 433 ft (132 m)
- Coordinates: 46°58′22″N 123°08′20″W

Geography
- Location: Thurston County, Washington, U.S.
- Parent range: Black Hills
- Topo map: USGS Capitol Peak

Capitol Peak is a 2,658-foot (810 m) peak in the Black Hills of the Capitol State Forest in the U.S. state of Washington.

It is one of the two highest peaks in the Black Hills, along with Larch Mountain and the third highest point in Thurston County. There is a partially paved road to the summit called the Sherman Valley Road.

The summit hosts a communications facility that includes an array of cell phone and radio towers. On a clear day, looking to the west is a view of Elma and the Satsop Nuclear Power Plant. Looking to the east is a view of Mount Rainier, Mount St. Helens, and Mount Adams; more to the north are Puget Sound, and the Olympia area.

== See also ==
- List of geographic features in Thurston County, Washington
