= Tumwater School District =

School district in Washington, United States

Coordinates: 46.92°N 122.95°W

Address
- 621 Linwood Avenue SW Tumwater, Thurston County, Washington, 98512; United States

Other information
- Website: tumwater.k12.wa.us

Tumwater School District No. 33 is a school district headquartered in Tumwater, Washington. The district's territory covers a total of 117 square miles (300 km^{2}) of area. Schools in the Tumwater area had been established by 1845.

As of 2019 the enrollment is over 6,000. Of the school districts in Thurston County, this is the third-highest such figure.

The U.S. Department of Education announced a Title IX investigation into Tumwater School District for allowing a transgender athlete in the opposing team against Tumwater High School Girls' basketball team in February 2025.

== History ==
=== Establishment ===
In the spring of 1964, voters approved the consolidation of East Olympia School District No. 327 and Tumwater School District No. 333 at a special election, forming Tumwater School District No. 33 on July 1, 1964. Previous consolidation that composed the component districts were as follows;

- On April 17, 1917, voters approved the consolidation of Belmore School District No. 2, Tumwater School District No. 6, and Brighton Park School District No. 63 at a special election, forming Tumwater School District No. 303 on July 1, 1917.
- In September of 1929, voters approved the consolidation of South Union School District No. 16 and Tumwater School District No. 303 at a special election, forming Tumwater School District No. 319.
- In March of 1937, voters approved the consolidation of Bush School District No. 7 and Tumwater School District No. 319 at a special election, forming Tumwater School District No. 326 on July 1, 1937.
- On April 26, 1937, voters approved the consolidation of Spurgeon Creek School District No. 45 and Chamber's Prairie School District No. 79 at a special election, forming East Olympia School District No. 327 on July 1, 1937.
- On March 2, 1946, voters approved the consolidation of Black Lake School District No. 65 and Tumwater School District No. 326 at a special election, forming Tumwater School District No. 333 on July 1, 1946.

In October of 1974, the Washington State Board of Education ordered that Littlerock School District No. 332 would be annexed into Tumwater School District No. 33. The decision came after Littlerock voters turned down two bond issues in spring of 1973 that would've composed Littlerock's obligated share of funding needed to make an addition to the Tumwater High School. Washington State law mandated that any school district that does not operate its own high school must share the costs of the high school where its students are sent. Previous consolidations that composed the former Littlerock School District No. 332 were as follows;

- Around 1918, voters approved the consolidation of Littlerock School District No. 19 and School District No. 23 at a special election, forming Littlerock School District No. 306.
- On August 19, 1922, voters approved the consolidation of Delphi School District No. 5 and Sherman Valley (also called North Star) School District No. 49 at a special election, forming Delphi School District No. 313.
- On May 24, 1924, voters approved the consolidation of Fairview School District No. 51 and Littlerock School District No. 306 at a special election, forming Littlerock School District No. 316 on July 1, 1924.
- On August 1, 1936, voters approved the consolidation of Alder Grove School District No. 62 and Littlerock School District No. 316 at a special election, forming Littlerock School District No. 325.
- On March 6, 1943, voters approved the consolidation of Delphi School District No. 313 and Littlerock School District No. 325 at a special election, forming Littlerock School District No. 331 on July 1, 1943.
- On October 27, 1945, voters approved the consolidation of Maytown School District No. 18 and Littlerock School District No. 331 at a special election, forming Littlerock School District No. 332.

== Schools ==
High schools

- Black Hills High School
- Cascadia High School
- Tumwater High School

Middle schools

- G. W. Bush Middle School
- Tumwater Middle School

Elementary schools

- Black Lake Elementary School
- East Olympia Elementary School
- Littlerock Elementary School
- Michael T. Simmons Elementary School
- Peter G. Schmidt Elementary School
- Tumwater Hill Elementary School

Other

- New Market Skills Center
