= Black Hills (Washington) =

Range of hills in the State of Washington, United States

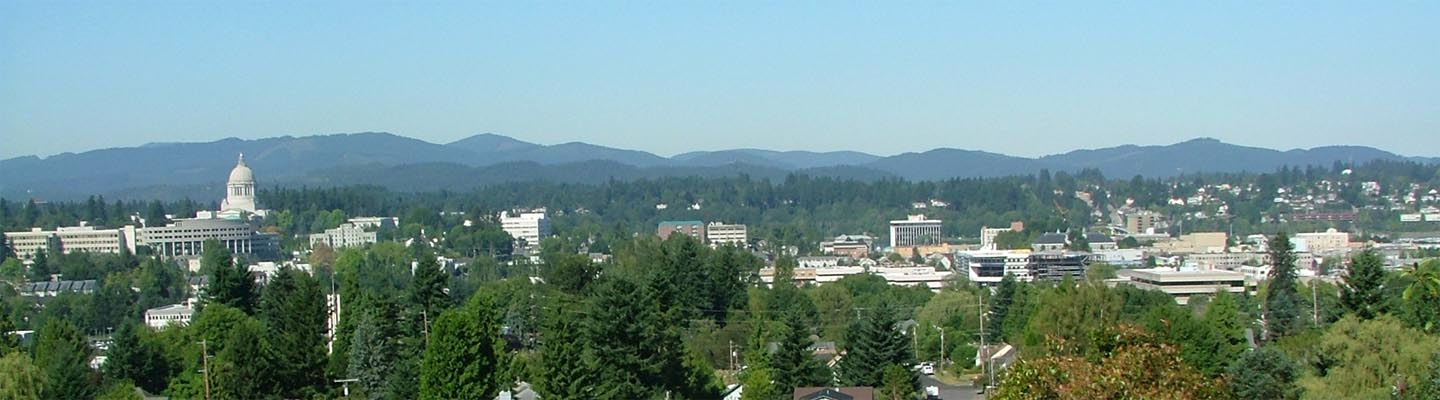
- Black Hills behind the state capitol building in Olympia

Highest point
- Peak: Capitol Peak
- Elevation: 2,664 ft (812 m)
- Coordinates: 46°58′22″N 123°08′11″W

Geography
- Location within Washington (state)
- Country: United States
- State: Washington
- Region: Western Washington
- Range coordinates: 46°59′14″N 123°08′16″W
- Parent range: Willapa Hills

The Black Hills are a small range of hills in Thurston and Grays Harbor counties of Washington. They are widely considered a subset of the Willapa Hills; however, the line parent of the Black Hills is Rock Peak, in the Olympic Mountains.

The tallest peak in the range is Capitol Peak with a 2,664-foot (812 m) height.

The Black Hills takes its name from the Black River. A former variant name was "Black Mountains".

The Capitol State Forest has roughly the same boundaries as the Black Hills.

The high school A.G. West Black Hills, Tumwater, Washington, is named for the hills, as is the local soccer club, the Blackhills Football Club. Capital Medical Center on the west side of Olympia was named Black Hills Community Hospital from its opening in 1985 until 1991.

== See also ==
- List of geographic features in Thurston County, Washington
