= Tumwater, Washington =

- City
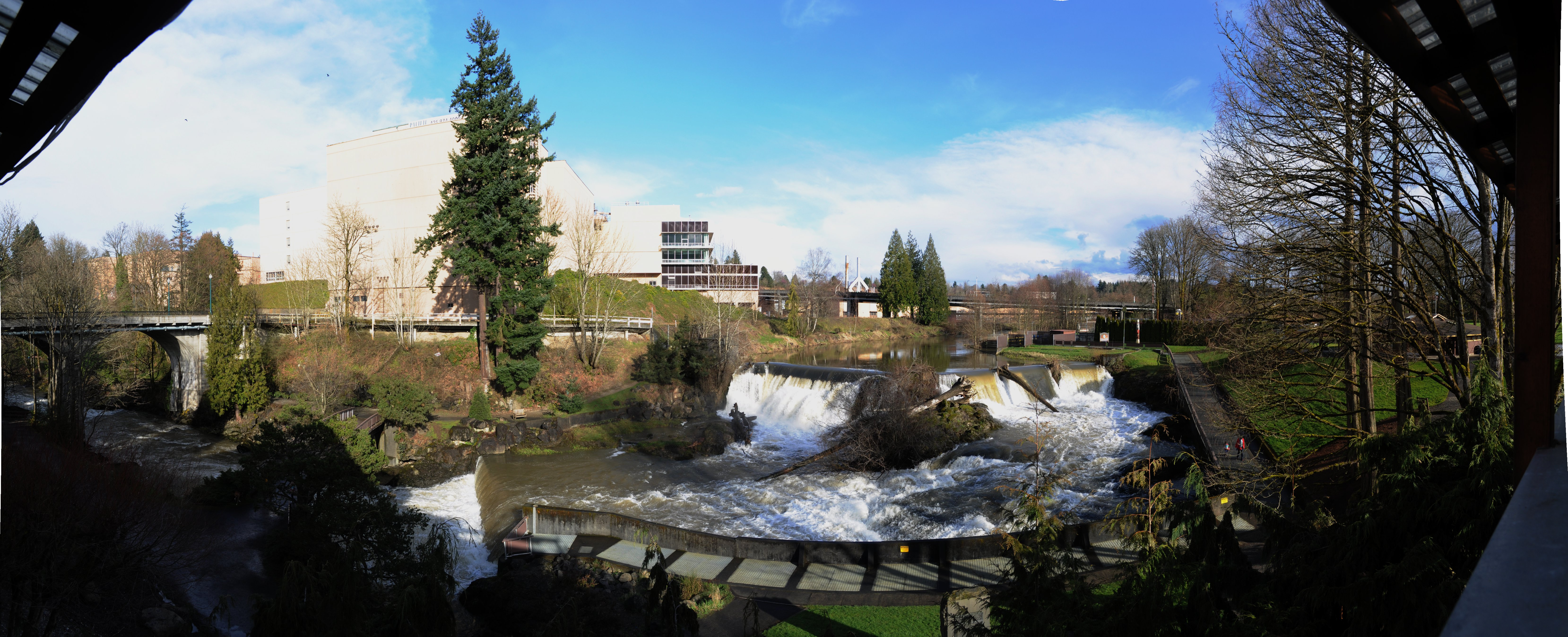
- Panoramic view of the upper falls and the former Olympia Brewery, 2011
- Interactive location map of Tumwater
- Coordinates: 47°0′28″N 122°54′40″W
- Country: United States
- State: Washington
- County: Thurston
- Incorporated: November 25, 1869

Government
  - Type: Mayor–council
  - Mayor: Leatta Dahlhoff

Area
  - Total: 17.76 sq mi (46.00 km^{2})
  - Land: 17.50 sq mi (45.32 km^{2})
  - Water: 0.26 sq mi (0.67 km^{2})
- Elevation: 174 ft (53 m)

Population (2020)
  - Total: 25,350
  - Estimate (2024): 27,826
  - Density: 1,372.8/sq mi (530.04/km^{2})
- Time zone: UTC−8 (PST)
  - Summer (DST): UTC−7 (PDT)
- ZIP Codes: 98501, 98511–98512
- Area code: 360, 564
- FIPS code: 53-72905
- GNIS feature ID: 1512742
- Website: ci.tumwater.wa.us

Tumwater is a city in Thurston County, Washington, United States. The population was 25,350 at the 2020 census. The city is situated near where the Deschutes River enters Budd Inlet, the southernmost point of Puget Sound; it also borders the state capital of Olympia to the north. Tumwater is the oldest permanent Anglo-American settlement on Puget Sound. The city is the southern gateway to the wider Seattle/Tacoma urban area, which stretches from Tumwater to Marysville along the Interstate 5 corridor.

== Etymology ==
Tumwater was originally called "Newmarket" by American settlers, and under the latter name was platted in 1845. The present name is derived from the Chinook Jargon word tumwata, which means "waterfall".

== History ==
The site of Tumwater and Tumwater Falls has been home to Southern Lushootseed-speaking peoples known as the Steh-Chass / Stehchass or Statca'sabsh (a subtribe of the Sahewamish (Sahe'wabsh), a subgroup of the Nisqually people; who became part of the post-treaty Squaxin Island Tribe) for thousands of years. "Steh-Chass" is the Lushootseed name for Budd Inlet, Deschutes River and the Tumwater Falls area, and for an important village of the Statca'sabsh.

A post office called Tumwater was established in 1863. Tumwater was incorporated as a fourth-class municipality, commonly referred to as a town, on November 25, 1869.

The construction of Interstate 5, which was completed in 1958, required the demolition of 100 buildings in downtown Tumwater. Major businesses had already relocated northeast to Tumwater Square, which remains a local shopping center. The Tumwater Historic District was listed on the National Register of Historic Places in 1978 to preserve remnants of downtown amid plans to widen Interstate 5.

On March 10, 1964, residents in the Town of Tumwater approved the reorganization of Tumwater as a third-class municipality, resulting in the name of the City of Tumwater being adopted. The city was reclassified from a third-class municipality to a non-charter code city on June 21, 1994, retaining the name of the City of Tumwater.

== Geography ==
Tumwater is located two miles south of the neighboring state capital of Olympia.

According to the United States Census Bureau, the city has a total area of 14.49 square miles (37.53 km^{2}), of which, 14.32 square miles (37.09 km^{2}) is land and 0.17 square miles (0.44 km^{2}) is water.

=== Climate ===
This region experiences warm and dry summers, with average monthly temperatures between 71.6 °F (22 °C) and 98.1 °F (36.7 °C). According to the Köppen Climate Classification system, Tumwater has a very warm-summer Mediterranean climate, abbreviated "Csb" on climate maps.

== Demographics ==
Based on per capita income, one of the more reliable measures of affluence, Tumwater ranks 89th of 522 areas in the state of Washington to be ranked. It is also the highest rank in Thurston County.

Historical population
Census	Pop.	Note	%±
1870	354		—
1880	171		−51.7%
1890	410		139.8%
1900	270		−34.1%
1910	490		81.5%
1920	472		−3.7%
1930	793		68.0%
1940	955		20.4%
1950	2,725		185.3%
1960	3,885		42.6%
1970	5,373		38.3%
1980	6,705		24.8%
1990	9,976		48.8%
2000	12,698		27.3%
2010	17,371		36.8%
2020	25,350		45.9%
2024 (est.)	27,826		9.8%
U.S. Decennial Census; 2020 Census

=== 2020 census ===
As of the 2020 census, Tumwater had a population of 25,350. The median age was 37.8 years, 22.0% of residents were under the age of 18, and 16.1% of residents were 65 years of age or older. For every 100 females there were 90.5 males, and for every 100 females age 18 and over there were 86.6 males age 18 and over.

There were 10,488 households in Tumwater, of which 30.1% had children under the age of 18 living in them. Of all households, 43.8% were married-couple households, 16.7% were households with a male householder and no spouse or partner present, and 30.2% were households with a female householder and no spouse or partner present. About 29.0% of all households were made up of individuals and 10.9% had someone living alone who was 65 years of age or older.

There were 10,847 housing units, of which 3.3% were vacant. The homeowner vacancy rate was 0.7% and the rental vacancy rate was 3.1%.

99.9% of residents lived in urban areas, while 0.1% lived in rural areas.

Racial composition as of the 2020 census
Race	Number	Percent
White	19,186	75.7%
Black or African American	681	2.7%
American Indian and Alaska Native	328	1.3%
Asian	1,372	5.4%
Native Hawaiian and Other Pacific Islander	189	0.7%
Some other race	606	2.4%
Two or more races	2,988	11.8%
Hispanic or Latino (of any race)	2,203	8.7%

=== 2010 census ===
As of the 2010 census, there were 17,371 people, 7,566 households, and 4,460 families living in the city. The population density was 1,213.1 inhabitants per square mile (468.4/km^{2}). There were 8,064 housing units at an average density of 563.1 per square mile (217.4/km^{2}). The racial makeup of the city was 85.0% White, 1.7% African American, 1.2% Native American, 4.8% Asian, 0.5% Pacific Islander, 1.6% from other races, and 5.2% from two or more races. Hispanic or Latino of any race were 6.2% of the population.

There were 7,566 households, of which 28.9% had children under the age of 18 living with them, 40.9% were married couples living together, 13.1% had a female householder with no husband present, 4.9% had a male householder with no wife present, and 41.1% were non-families. Of all households, 31.6% were made up of individuals, and 9.7% had someone living alone who was 65 years of age or older. The average household size was 2.27 and the average family size was 2.83.

The median age in the city was 35 years. 27% of residents were under the age of 18, 10% from 18 to 24; 31.7% were between the ages of 25 and 44; 26.8% from 45 to 64; and 13% were 65 years of age or older. The gender makeup of the city was 47.7% male and 52.3% female.

=== 2000 census ===
As of the 2000 census, there were 12,698 people, 5,659 households, and 3,253 families living in the city. The population density was 1,276.1 people per square mile (492.7/km^{2}). There were 5,953 housing units at an average density of 598.2 per square mile (231.0/km^{2}). The racial makeup of the city was 88.41% White, 1.39% African American, 1.24% Native American, 3.90% Asian, 0.36% Pacific Islander, 1.50% from other races, and 3.21% from two or more races. Hispanic or Latino of any race were 4.08% of the population.

There were 5,659 households, out of which 28.3% had children under the age of 18 living with them, 41.5% were married couples living together, 12.3% had a female householder with no husband present, and 42.5% were non-families. Of all households, 33.7% were made up of individuals, and 10.2% had someone living alone who was 65 years of age or older. The average household size was 2.20 and the average family size was 2.82.

In the city, the age distribution of the population shows 23.2% under the age of 18, 10.9% from 18 to 24, 29.5% from 25 to 44, 23.0% from 45 to 64, and 13.5% who were 65 years of age or older. The median age was 36 years. For every 100 females, there were 89.8 males. For every 100 females age 18 and over, there were 84.5 males.

The median income for a household in the city was $43,329, and the median income for a family was $54,156. Males had a median income of $41,778 versus $32,044 for females. The per capita income for the city was $25,080. About 4.3% of families and 8.5% of the population were below the poverty line, including 9.5% of those under age 18 and 5.2% of those age 65 or over.

== Arts and culture ==
The Davis-Meeker Oak, listed on the Tumwater Register of Historic Places, is a 400-year-old historic Garry oak located at the Olympia Regional Airport on Old Highway 99. The tree is a marker on the Cowlitz Trail and was named after Ezra Meeker and Jack Davis, an environmentalist who helped save the oak in 1984 during a highway improvement project. Attempts to remove the tree began in 2024 after concerns over safety for passing motorists. Due to public protests, coupled with a citizen lawsuit and discrepancies in reports on the oak's health, the tree was permanently protected from alterations or removal in December 2025.

Four identical concrete totem poles are located on the Art Deco-style Carlyon Bridge in Tumwater. The Haida-style sculptures contain, from the top, a raven, a grizzly bear, an eagle, and another bear. The totems were added as part of an overall project on Capitol Boulevard in 1937. The sculptures, when erected, were considered to be the only known concrete totems in the world. They remained without color until 1951, painted with some hues regarded to be non-traditional in indigenous works, but repainted after 1990. The designer of the totems is unknown.

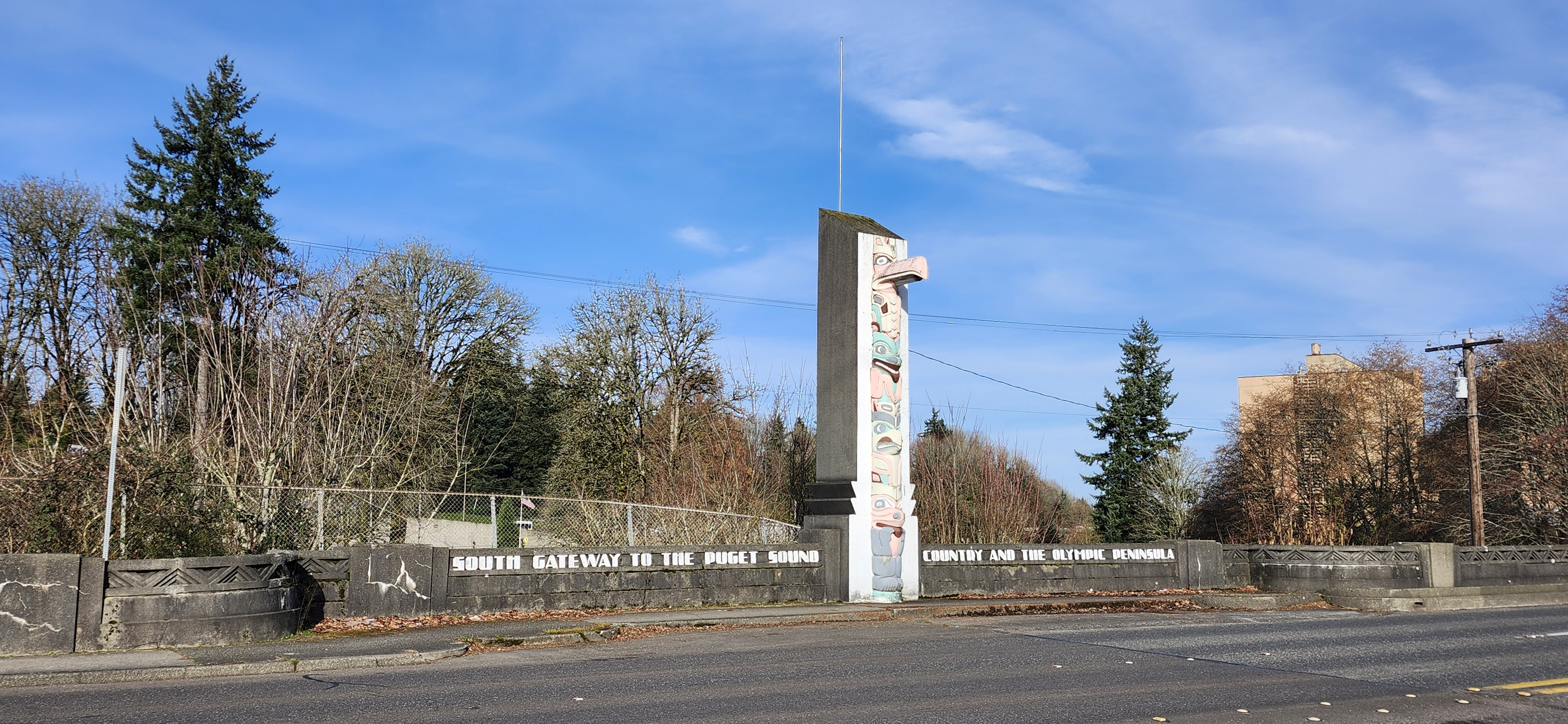
Carlyon Bridge totem pole, 2026

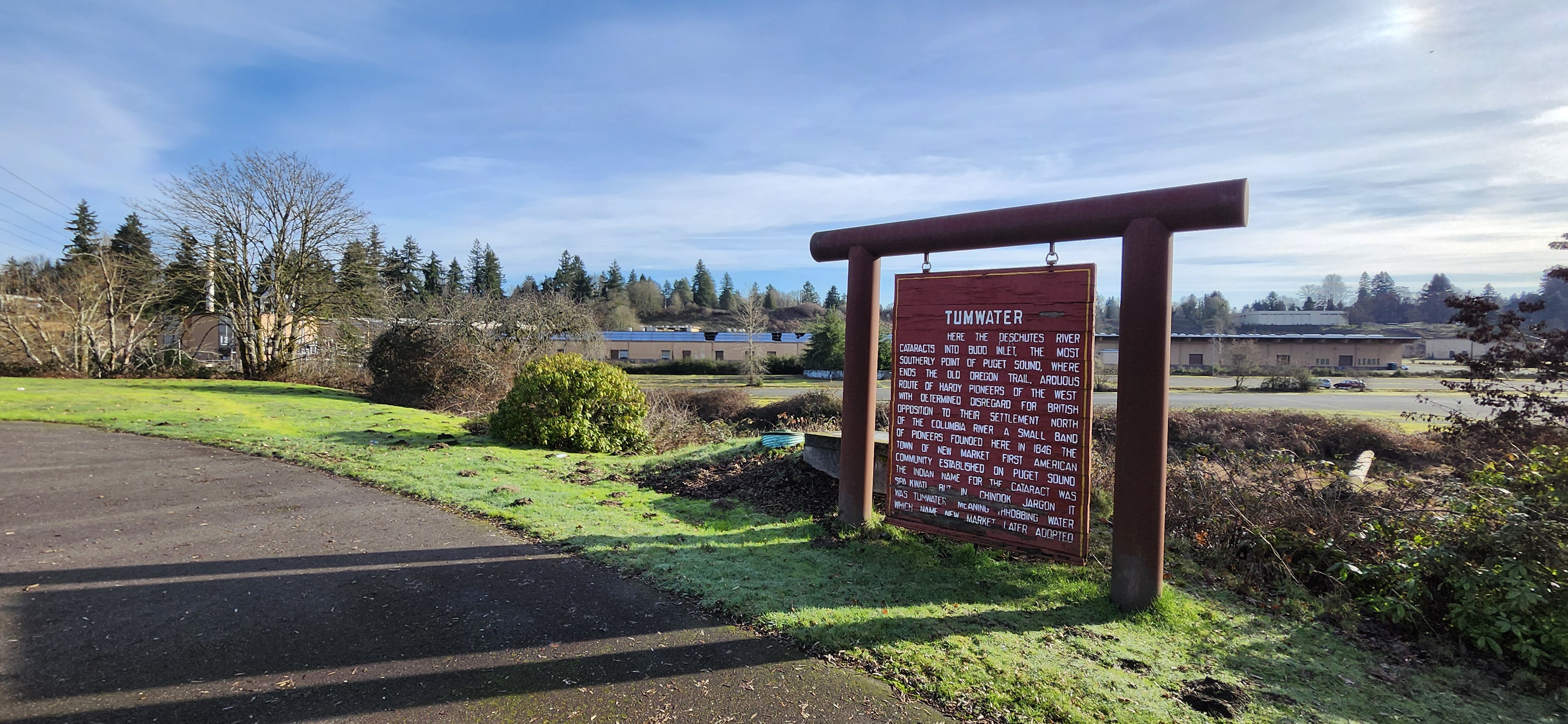
Tumwater historical marker, 2026

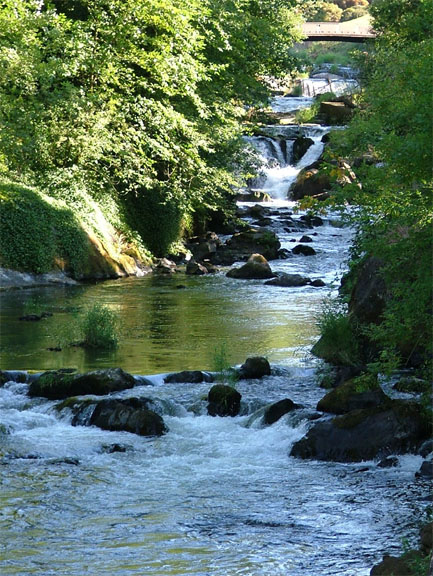
Tumwater Falls of the Deschutes River, 2005

== Government ==
Due to the city being located in close proximity to the state capital, Tumwater is home to many state government offices, including the Washington State Department of Corrections, the Washington State Department of Labor and Industries, the Washington State Department of Health, the Washington State Office of the Insurance Commissioner, the Washington State Department of Revenue and the Office of the Attorney General.

The City of Tumwater itself is a non-charter Code City and uses a mayor-council form of government. The Mayor is elected as a chief executive officer and advised by seven council members who act as policymakers and provide guidelines and performance objectives. The Tumwater City Council elections are held in odd-numbered years.

As of 2024, the city has 520 full and part-time employees and an annual budget of $330 million. In 2023, the city had 241 employees and a 2023–2024 biennium general fund budget of $84.9 million, an increase from a 2021–2022 biennium expense budget of $63.9 million and 235 employees.

== Economy ==
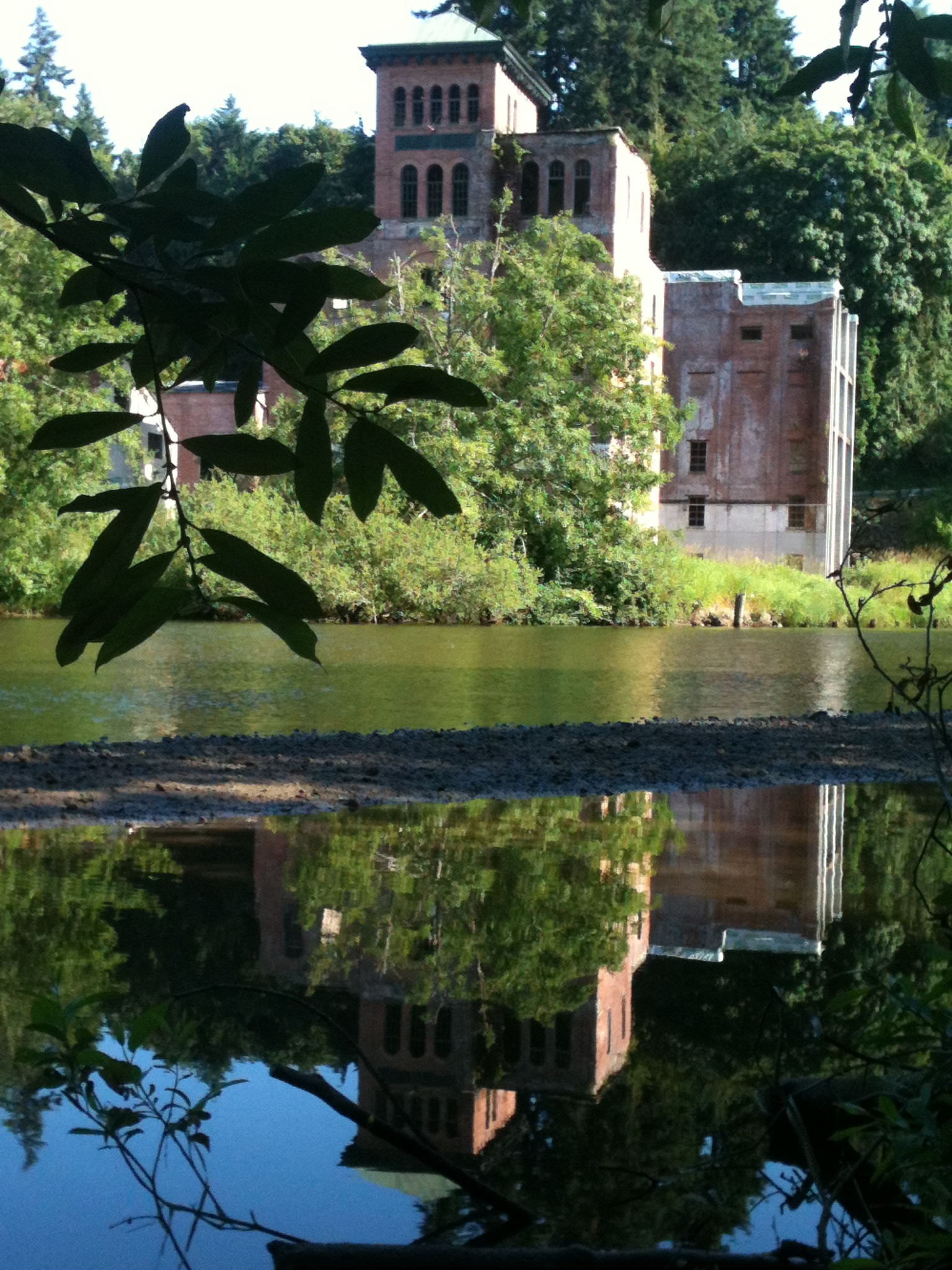
Original brewery, Olympia Beer, 2012

Tumwater's economy is anchored by state government offices, with agencies including the Washington State Department of Health, Department of Labor and Industries, and Washington State Library headquartered in the city. Major private employers include Cardinal Glass and Pepsi Northwest Beverages.

The Olympia-Lacey-Tumwater metropolitan statistical area ranked second nationally for economic strength in a 2024 study by Chmura Analytics, citing concentration of STEM talent and advanced industry employment.

== Education ==
The Tumwater School District is home to numerous schools including Tumwater High School and Black Hills High School.
